= Luis Fonseca (sailor) =

United States Navy sailor and Navy Cross Recipient

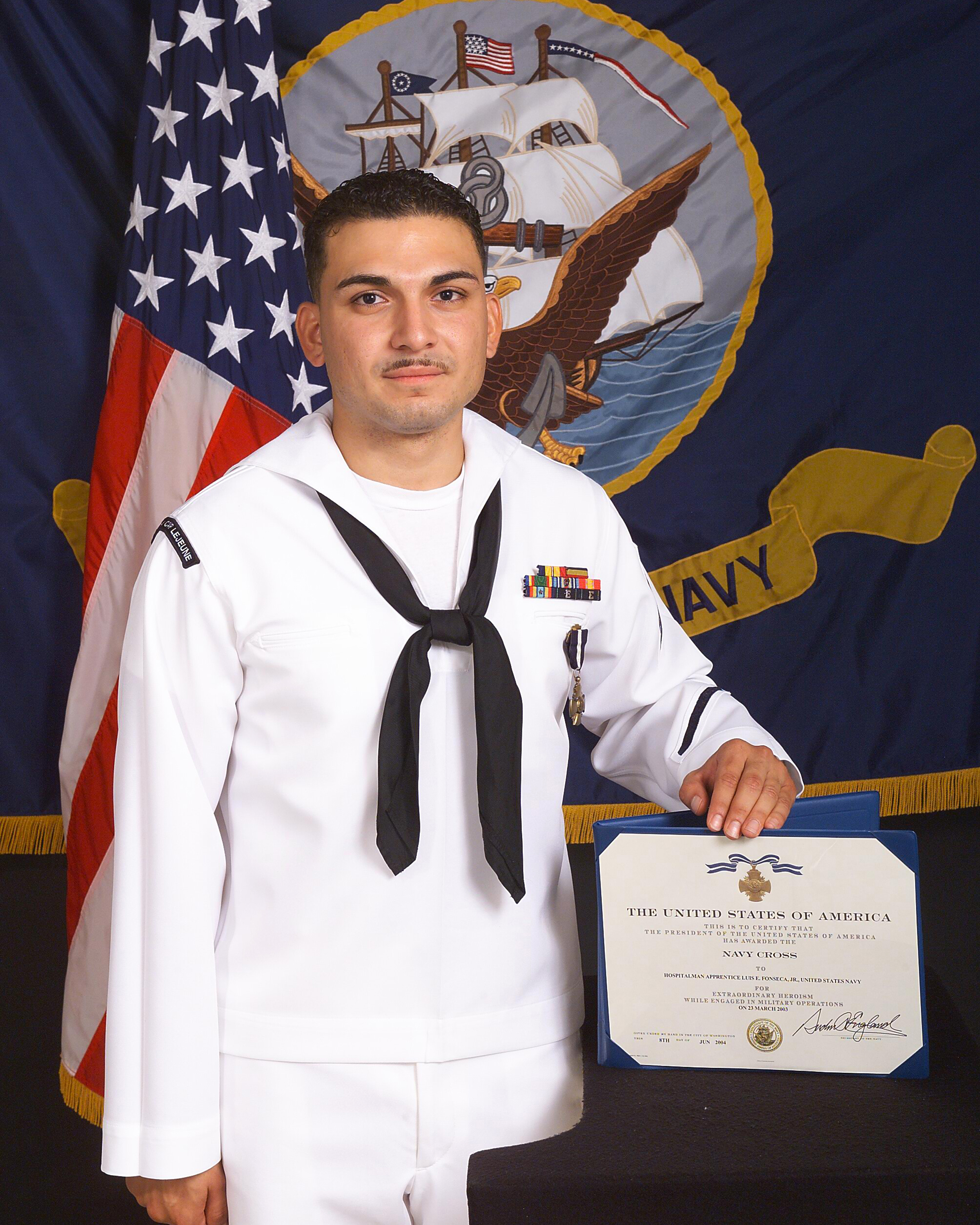
- Fonseca with his Navy Cross award in 2004
- Born: 1980 (age 45–46); Frankfurt, West Germany (now Frankfurt, Germany)
- Spouse: Christina Fonseca
- Military career
- Allegiance: United States
- Branch: United States Navy
- Service years: 1999–2021
- Rank: Hospital corpsman first class
- Nickname: "Doc Speedy"
- Units: 2nd Assault Amphibian Battalion; 1st Battalion, 2nd Marines; 2nd Battalion, 8th Marines; Naval Hospital Camp Lejeune; USS Bataan (LHD-5)
- Conflicts: Iraq War; Battle of Nasiriyah; War in Afghanistan
- Awards: Navy Cross; Navy and Marine Corps Commendation Medal (2); Navy and Marine Corps Achievement Medal (2)
- Other work: Legion of Valor

Luis E. Fonseca, Jr. (born 1980) is a retired United States Navy hospital corpsman who was awarded the Navy Cross for extraordinary heroism on March 23, 2003, while assigned to a Marine Corps amphibious assault vehicle platoon serving with the 1st Battalion, 2nd Marine Regiment, during the Battle of Nasiriyah in Nasiriyah, Iraq. This was the first major battle fought in Iraq by the United States Marine Corps (and United States Army) during Operation Iraqi Freedom.

== Early life and education ==
Fonseca was born in Frankfurt, West Germany in 1980, where his father was stationed while serving in the United States Army. When his father retired from the army in Fayetteville, North Carolina, Fonseca and his older sister were raised there by his parents.

Although Fonseca dropped out of high school, he continued his education. Fonseca graduated with his associate degree in June 2015 and is currently working on his prerequisites for PA school.

== Career ==
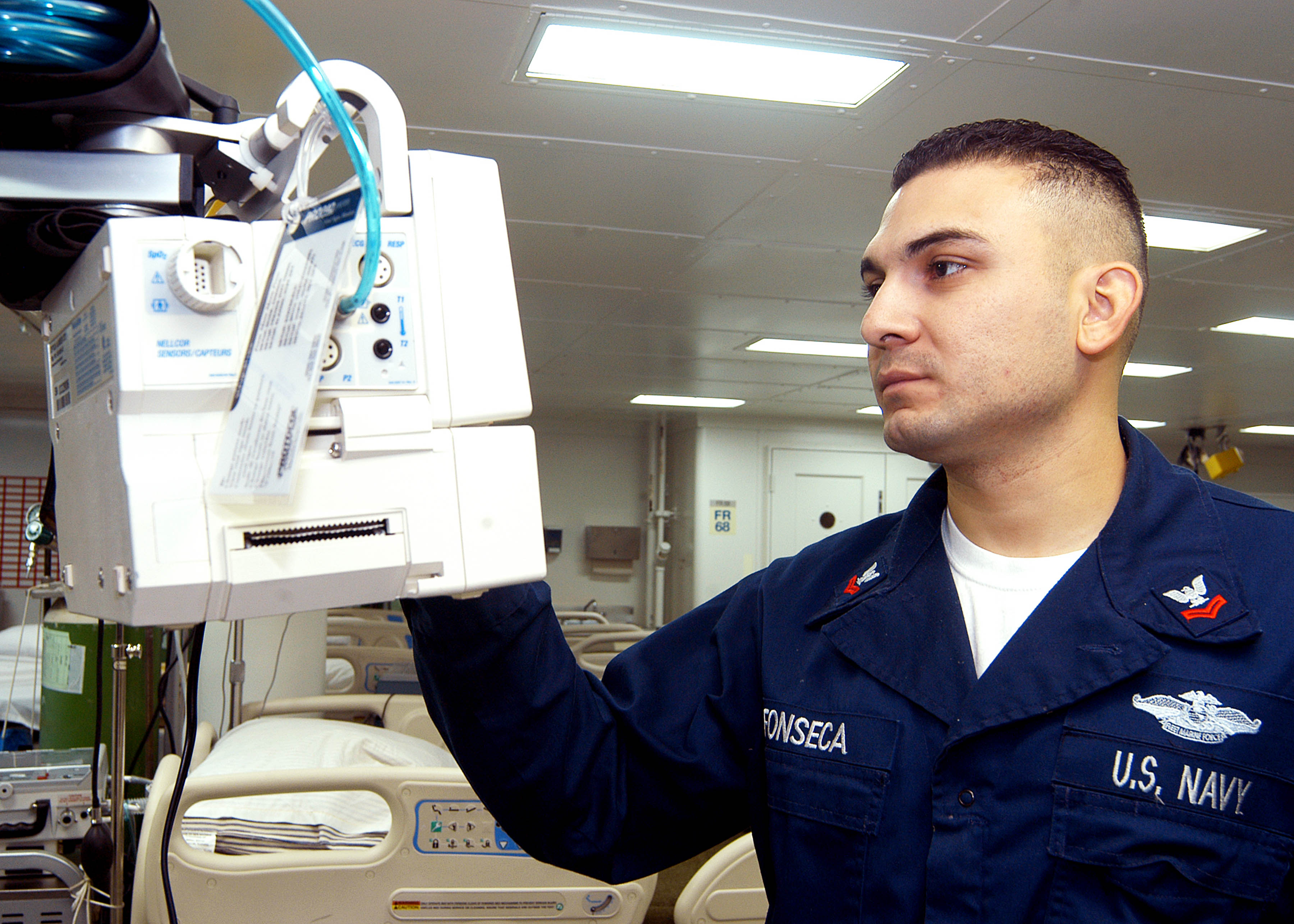
Fonseca in November 2008, checking a piece of medical equipment.

Fonseca initially wanted to enlist in the United States Marine Corps, but decided otherwise when he discovered that they did not have a dedicated medical occupational specialty. He ended up enlisting in the United States Navy to become a hospital corpsman in 1999, and graduated from Recruit Training Command Great Lakes in September of that year. Fonseca graduated from the Navy's Hospital Corpsman "A" School in February 2000. He was assigned to the Fleet Marine Force and graduated from the Marine Corps Field Medical Service School in May 2000. He was assigned to Company A, 2nd Assault Amphibian Battalion, from May 2000 to August 2003, and to 2nd Battalion, 8th Marines, from August 2003 to July 2004. Afterwards, he served at Naval Hospital Camp Lejeune from July 2004 until May 2007, and later, with the Navy's amphibious assault ship USS Bataan.

Fonseca served two combat tours with the Marines in Iraq, in 2003 and 2005, and one tour with the Marines in the War in Afghanistan, from November 2003 to May 2004. On 11 August 2004, he was awarded the Navy Cross for his actions in Iraq on 23 March 2003, by Secretary of the Navy Gordon R. England at Marine Corps Base Camp Lejeune, North Carolina. The stress of his combat tours, combined with the fame and attention received as a result of being awarded the nation's second highest medal for valor in combat, led Fonseca to alcohol abuse and post-traumatic stress disorder (PTSD). Ultimately, his commanders intervened, and Fonseca received assistance in the form of counseling and medication, making a recovery possible.

=== Navy Cross citation ===
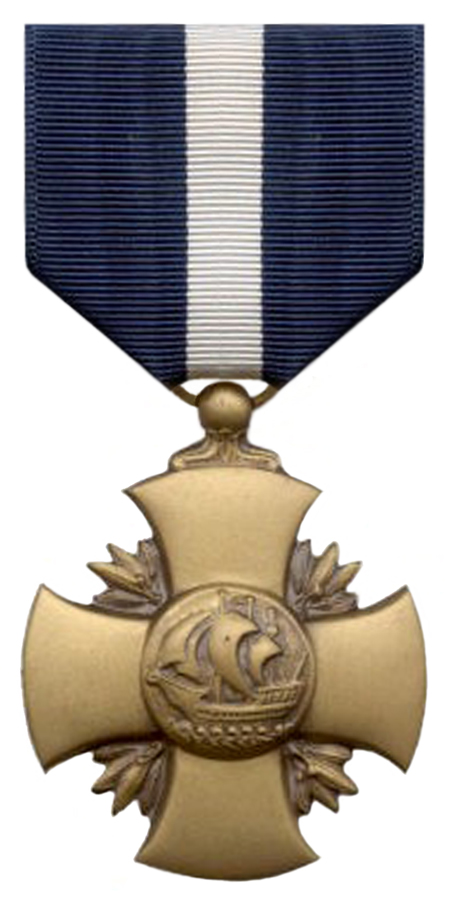
Navy cross

The President of the United States of America takes pleasure in presenting the Navy Cross to Hospital Apprentice Luis E. Fonseca, United States Navy, for extraordinary heroism in action against the enemy while serving as Corpsman, Amphibious Assault Vehicle Platoon, Company C., First Battalion, Second Marines, Regimental Combat Team Two, Task Force Tarawa, First Marine Expeditionary Force, in support of Operation Iraqi Freedom on 23 March 2003. During Company C's assault and seizure of the Saddam Canal Bridge, an amphibious assault vehicle was struck by a rocket-propelled grenade inflicting five casualties. Without concern for his own safety, Hospitalman Apprentice Fonseca braved small arms, machine gun, and intense rocket propelled grenade fire to evacuate the wounded Marines from the burning amphibious assault vehicle and tend to their wounds. He established a casualty collection point inside the unit's medical evacuation amphibious assault vehicle, calmly and methodically stabilizing two casualties with lower limb amputations by applying tourniquets and administering morphine. He continued to treat and care for the wounded awaiting evacuation until his vehicle was rendered immobile by enemy direct and indirect fire. Under a wall of enemy machine gun fire, he directed the movement of four casualties from the damaged vehicle by organizing litter teams from available Marines. He personally carried one critically wounded Marine over open ground to another vehicle. Following a deadly artillery barrage, Hospitalman Apprentice Fonseca again exposed himself to enemy fire to treat Marines wounded along the perimeter. Returning to the casualty evacuation amphibious assault vehicle, he accompanied his casualties South through the city to a Battalion Aid Station. After briefing medical personnel on the status of his patients, Hospitalman Apprentice Fonseca returned North through the city to Company C's lines and to his fellow Marines that had been wounded in his absence. His timely and effective care undoubtedly saved the lives of numerous casualties. Hospitalman Apprentice Fonseca's actions reflected great credit upon himself and upheld the highest traditions to the Marine Corps and the United States Naval Service.

== Awards and decorations ==
Fonseca's awards and decorations:

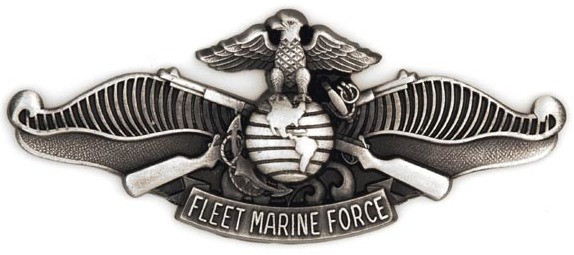

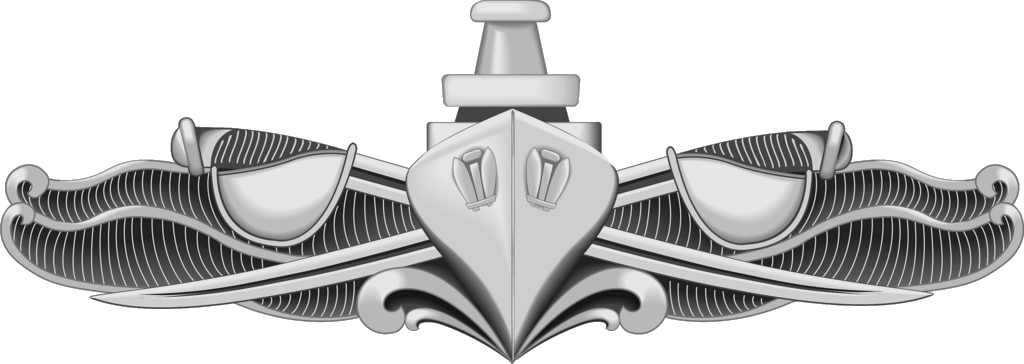

Badge	Fleet Marine Force Enlisted Warfare Specialist Device		
1st row		Navy Cross	
2nd row	Navy and Marine Corps Commendation Medal with 1 Gold Star	Navy and Marine Corps Achievement Medal with 1 Gold Star	Combat Action Ribbon with 1 Gold Star
3rd row	Navy Presidential Unit Citation	Navy Unit Commendation	Navy Meritorious Unit Commendation with 1 bronze star
4th row	Navy "E" Ribbon with 2 silver "E" devices	Navy Good Conduct Medal with 1 silver and 1 bronze Service stars	Fleet Marine Force Ribbon
5th row	National Defense Service Medal	Afghanistan Campaign Medal with FMF Combat Operation Insignia and 2 bronze stars	Iraq Campaign Medal with FMF Combat Operation Insignia and 2 bronze stars
6th row	Global War on Terrorism Expeditionary Medal with FMF Combat Operation Insignia	Global War on Terrorism Service Medal	Humanitarian Service Medal
7th row	Armed Forces Service Medal	Military Outstanding Volunteer Service Medal	Sea Service Deployment Ribbon with 4 bronze stars
8th row	NATO Medal (ISAF)	Navy Rifle Marksmanship Medal with silver "E" device	Navy Pistol Marksmanship Medal with silver "E" device
Badge	Enlisted Surface Warfare Specialist Insignia		

- He wore five red service stripes at his retirement ceremony.

== Gallery ==
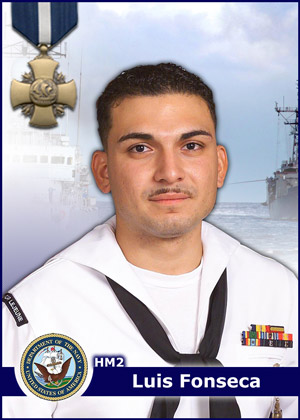
Fonseca in August 2004, during his tenure as a Hospitalman Apprentice (HA).

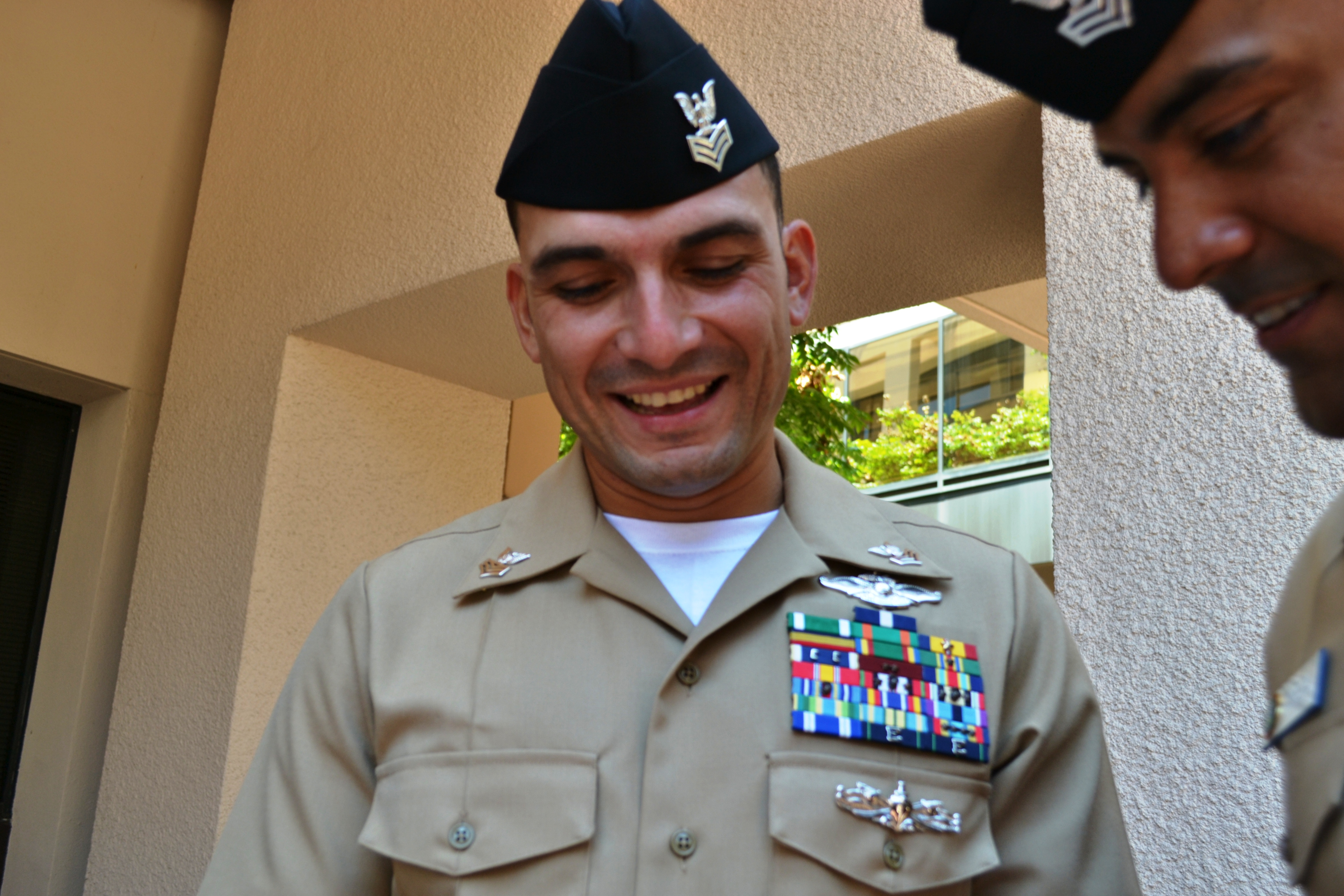
Fonseca in June 2012, after his rate advancement ceremony to Petty Officer First Class (PO1).

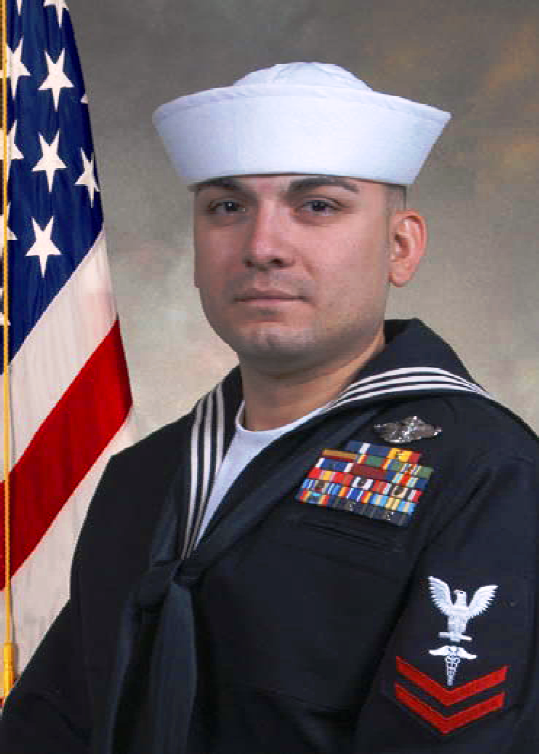
Fonseca during his tenure as a Hospital Corpsman Second Class

== See also ==
- Awards and decorations of the United States Armed Forces
- Marksmanship Device
- United States military award devices
