= Fleet Marine Force Ribbon =

Navy Fleet Marine Force Ribbon
- The Navy Fleet Marine Force Ribbon
- Type: Service ribbon
- Presented by: the Department of the Navy
- Status: No longer awarded
- Established: 1 September 1984
- First award: 1984
- Final award: 2006

Precedence
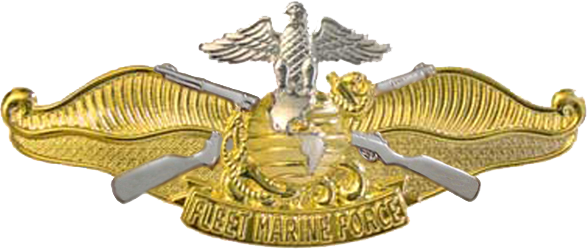
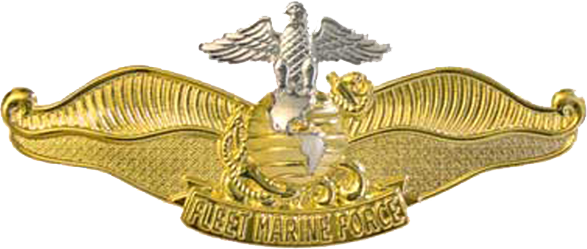
- Equivalent: Fleet Marine Force insignia

The Navy Fleet Marine Force Service Ribbon was a military award of the United States Navy established in 1984 by Secretary of the Navy John F. Lehman, Jr. The service ribbon was awarded to eligible Navy personnel serving with the Marine Corps between 1984 and 2006. The award signified the acquisition of specific professional skills, knowledge and military experience that resulted in qualifications above those normally required of Navy personnel serving with the Fleet Marine Force (FMF). The FMF Ribbon was discontinued in the mid-2000s due to the promulgation of the FMF badges.

== History ==
Qualification for the ribbon had to be obtained through a formal qualification program, and successful completion of a subsequent written test. To be eligible, Navy officer and enlisted personnel had to be assigned to an FMF unit. Only those personnel assigned to Type II and Type IV sea duty (i.e., deployable units) were eligible.

Additionally, officer and enlisted sailors had to complete sections of the Marine Battle Skills Training Handbook (Books 1, 2 and 4), which covered Military Justice and Law of War; Marine Corps Organization, History, Customs, and Courtesies; Marine Corps Uniform, Clothing and Equipment; Marine Corps General Leadership; Substance Abuse; Troop Information/Training Management; Combat Leadership; Individual Weapons (M16A2 Service Rifle, M9 Service Pistol); Tactical Measures; Hand Grenades, Mines, and Pyrotechnics; NBC Defense; First Aid and Field Sanitation; Land Navigation; Communication; and Maintain Physical Fitness. After completion, candidates had to pass a written exam on this material.

Enlisted active duty members of the Navy had to serve a minimum of 12 months (24 for Naval Reservists) with an FMF unit. Hospital corpsmen (HM) and dental technicians (DT) had to graduate from Field Medical Service School (FMSS). Religious program specialist (RP) had to graduate from Chaplain and RP Expeditionary Skills Training (CREST) course. Candidates in these three ratings had to obtain the appropriate Navy Enlisted Classification (NEC) (HM 8404/DT 8707/RP 2401). Navy personnel assigned to an FMF unit, who have no Navy Enlisted Classification Code (NEC) producing pipeline school (i.e., yeoman, personnelman, disbursing clerk, etc.), were also eligible. Enlisted personnel could have no single performance trait mark below 3.0 (on a 4.0 scale), and no recommendation lower than promotable for the previous two periodic evaluations.

Finally, candidates had to pass the USMC Physical Fitness Test (PFT), which included timed performance of a three-mile run, sit-ups, and pull-ups.

The awarding authority could waive the above requirements in cases when Navy personnel demonstrate exceptional skill, knowledge, and leadership while providing support to the Marine Corps in a combat environment.

In the mid-1990s, the Chief of Naval Operations, Admiral Jeremy Boorda, granted the title (FMF) to enlisted personnel who had earned the ribbon, e.g., HM2 (FMF) John Doe, USN. This put the Navy FMF Ribbon on par with Navy enlisted warfare qualification breast insignia such as Surface Warfare, Air Warfare, Submarine, etc. The designation also provided the recipient two additional points toward advancement in rate. Although naval sailors who earned the FMF Ribbon can use the "(FMF)" designator after their rate, but they are not allowed to wear the FMF badge until re-qualifying by completing the battery of tests required to wear the FMF badge.

=== Discontinuation ===
Effective October 1, 2006, the Fleet Marine Force Ribbon became obsolete as a result of the creation and promulgation of the Fleet Marine Force Qualified Officer Insignia and Fleet Marine Force Enlisted Warfare Specialist Insignia programs a few years prior. However, those who were awarded the FMF Ribbon can continue to wear it.

== See also ==
- Obsolete military awards of the United States
- Military awards of the United States Department of the Navy
- Fleet Marine Force Combat Operation Insignia
