= Fleet Marine Force insignia =

Military badge in the US Navy

The Fleet Marine Force warfare insignia, also known as the Fleet Marine Force badge or FMF pin, are three military badges of the United States Navy which are issued to those U.S. Navy officers and sailors who are trained and qualified to perform duties in support of the United States Marine Corps. There are currently three classes of the Fleet Marine Force pin, being that of enlisted, officer, and chaplain.

== Enlisted ==
Fleet Marine Force enlisted warfare specialist device
- The Fleet Marine Force enlisted warfare specialist device (FMFEWS) consists of a silver metal device depicting the eagle, globe, and anchor of the U.S. Marine Corps, atop two crossed rifles on a background of ocean swells breaking on a sandy beach and a scroll with the words "Fleet Marine Force".
- Armiger: U.S. Department of the Navy
- Adopted: July 2000
- Shield: Eagle, Globe, and Anchor
- Motto: Fleet Marine Force
- Earlier version: Fleet Marine Force Ribbon
- Use: To denote those enlisted U.S. Navy sailors who have completed the requirements of the Enlisted Fleet Marine Force Warfare Specialist (EFMFWS) Program per OPNAV Instruction 1414.4B.

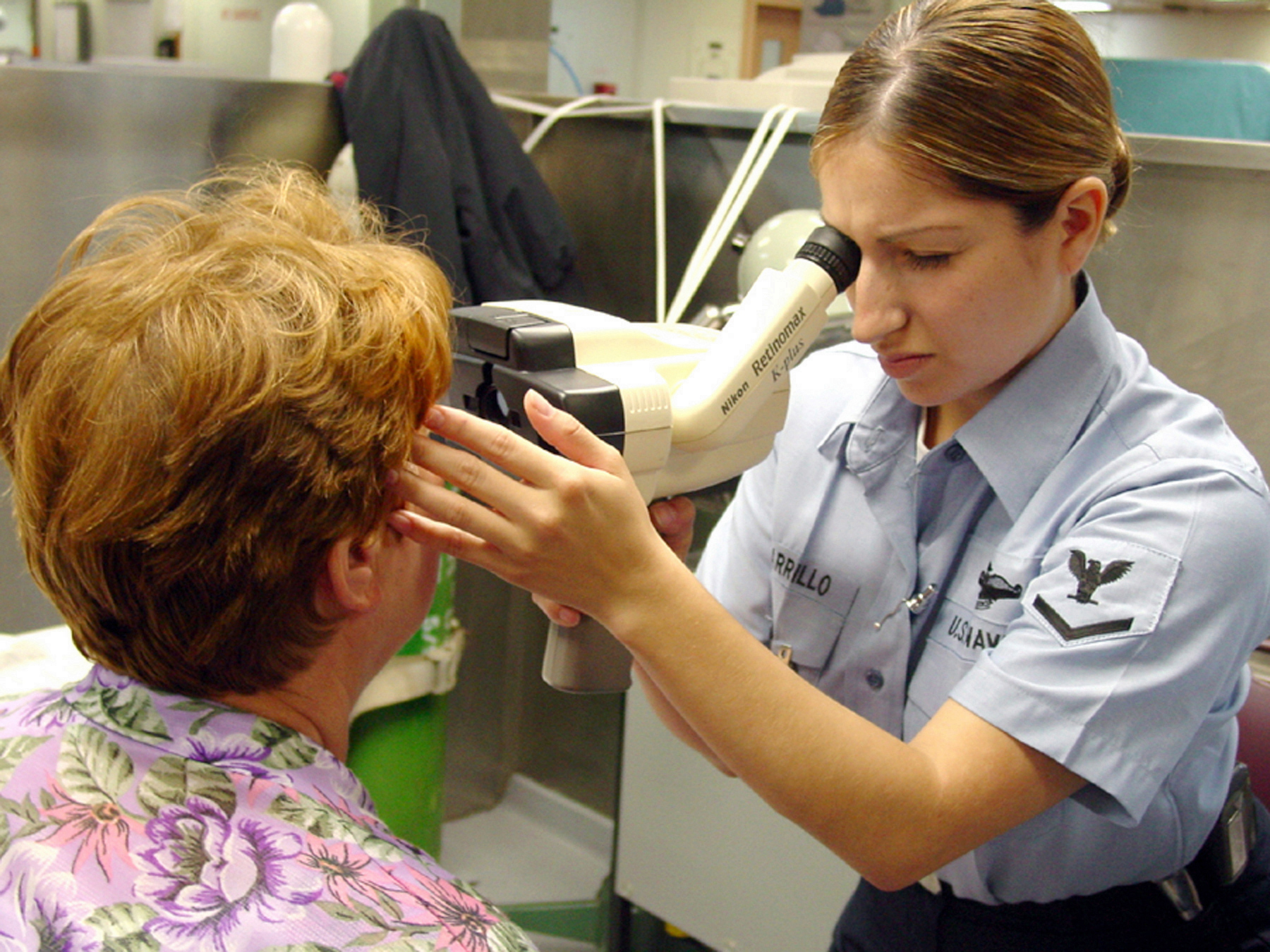
Embroidered FMF badge on a navy corpsman's utility shirt in July 2002

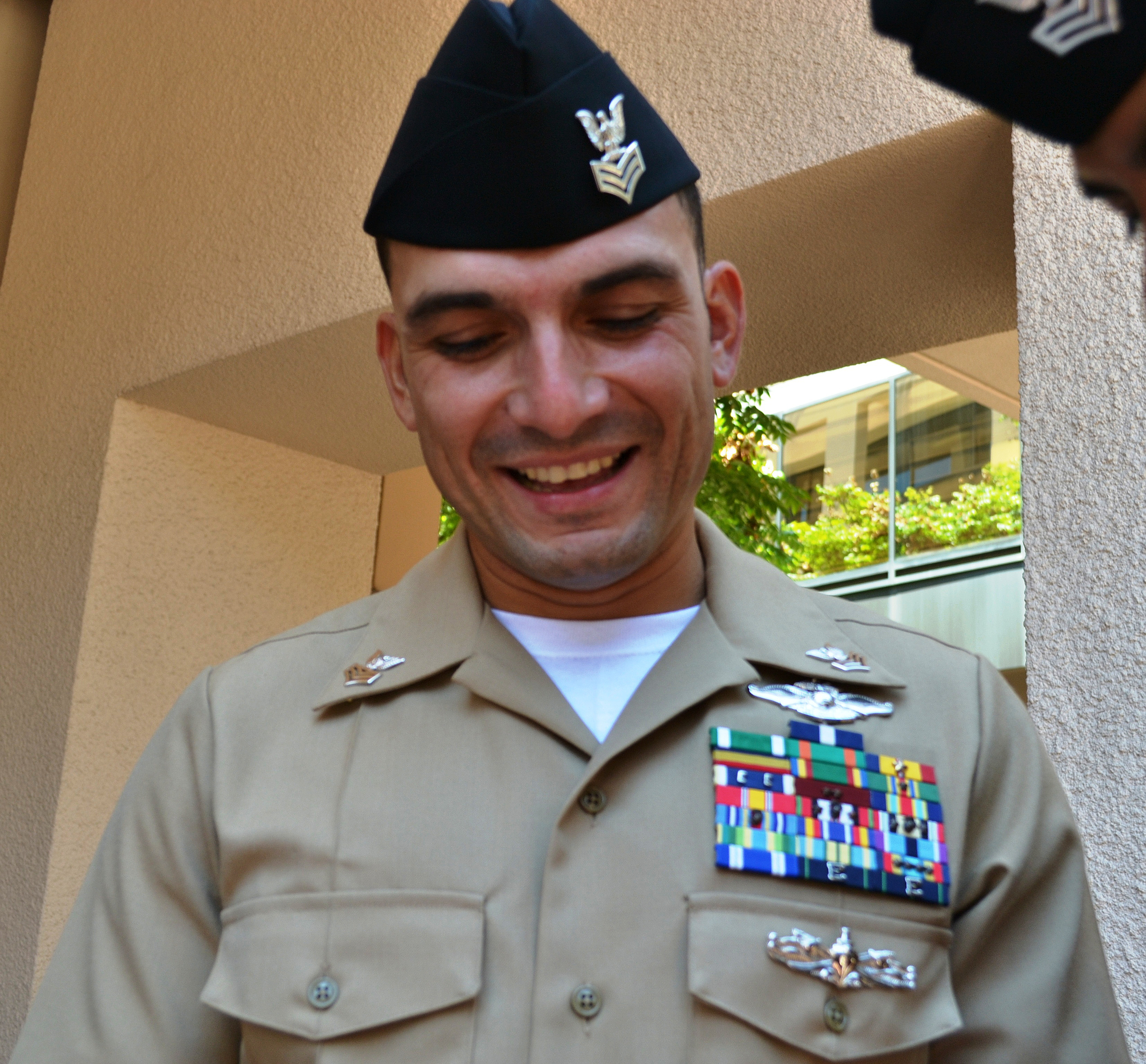
Hospital corpsman Luis Fonseca in June 2012 wearing the FMFEWS on the NSU.

The Fleet Marine Force enlisted warfare specialist device (FMFEWS) is a qualification insignia of the United States Navy earned by enlisted U.S. Navy sailors assigned to the Fleet Marine Force of the U.S. Marine Corps who have successfully completed the requirements of the Enlisted Fleet Marine Force Warfare Specialist (EFMFWS) program per OPNAV Instruction 1414.4B. This involves serving one year with a Marine Corps unit (two years for reserves), passing the Marine combat fitness test (CFT), a written test, demonstrating skills used in service with the Marines such as weapon breakdown and familiarization, land navigation, combat communications and an oral examination by senior enlisted sailors who are FMF qualified. The Enlisted Fleet Marine Force Warfare Specialist designation is most commonly awarded to the hospital corpsman (HM) and religious program specialist (RP) ratings, although it is also awarded to other sailors who support Marine Corps commands (e.g. logistics specialists assigned to medical logistics companies). It was created in 2000.

An enlisted U.S. Navy sailor who has qualified may place the designator (FMF) after their rating; for example, HM3 John Doe, having qualified, is identified as HM3 (FMF) Doe. As of 2004, all U.S. Navy corpsmen assigned to a Marine unit are required to earn the FMF badge within 18 months of their being assigned to said unit.

=== Enlisted requirements ===
When qualifying for the enlisted Fleet Marine Force warfare specialist pin, a sailor (typically a hospital corpsman, logistics specialist, religious programs specialist, personnel specialist, along with some construction battalion "SeaBee" units [when directly assigned to a U.S. Marine Corps combatant command]) is required to have detailed knowledge on the following subjects:

CORE

- Safety fundamentals (operational risk management)
- Marine Corps History, Rank Structure, and Courtesies (notable dates, personnel, battles, and Naval courtesies as they pertain to the USMC)
- Marine Corps Mission and Organization
- Administrative Fundamentals (Naval correspondence, courts martial, and service record information)
- General Combat Leadership Fundamentals (Combat elements, POW rights and responsibilities, Military Code of Conduct)
- First Aid and Field Sanitation Fundamentals (Triage, MEDEVAC & CASEVAC classifications, "Self" and "Buddy" aid skill sets for non-medical personnel)
- Security Fundamentals (Security classifications, terrorism, lethal force, and guard skills training)
- Field Communication Fundamentals (hands on detailed knowledge of the PRC-119 SINCGARS radio, loading frequencies and communication of the 9-Line CASEVAC message)
- Weapons Fundamentals (Detailed knowledge of small arms such as the M9, M16A4, M4, M1014, M67 grenade, M203, and M249 SAW) and machine gun platforms (M240G, M2 .50 cal, Mk19)
- Tactical Fundamental Procedures (platoon hand and arm signals, SALUTE and SMEAC reports, fighting positions, MOPP gear, formation movements in day/night conditions)
- Marine Corps Operations Fundamentals (In-depth knowledge of all USMC aircraft, US Navy amphibious transports, hospital ships, as well as Urban warfare examples, and Military Operations Other Than War examples)
- Chemical, Biological Radiological and Nuclear Defense Fundamentals (minefield signage and detailed signs, symptoms, & treatment of chemical agent exposures)
- Drill and Ceremonies Fundamentals (breakdowns of formations, drill & cadence, color guards, and formal ceremonies)
- Land Navigation Fundamentals (Map reading and compass handling)

Additionally a second section of the course is detailed toward the element of the United States Marine Corps with which the candidate is assigned. For example: a line corpsman with an infantry battalion will learn the ground combat element (GCE).

GCE

- Infantry fundamentals (mission & structure of the Marine division, regiment, battalion, infantry & weapons companies, platoon, squad, and fire teams)
- Marine artillery regiment (mission, structure, equipment of the artillery battalion; such as the M198 or M777 howitzer)
- Tank battalion fundamentals (mission, structure, and equipment of the tank battalion; such as the M1A1, TOW missile, M88A1E1 Hercules, and M60A1 bridge vehicle)
- Assault Amphibious Battalion Fundamentals (mission, structure, and vehicles of the AAB; such as the AAVP7A1, AAVC7A1 and AAVR7A1)
- Combat Engineer Battalion Fundamentals (mission, structure, mobility/counter mobility/survivability tasks of the CEB, Engineer Support Company, and Combat Engineer Company)
- Light Armored Reconnaissance Battalion (mission, structure, and vehicles of the LAV Battalion; such as the LAV-25, LAV-M, LAV-AT, LAV-C2, LAV-R, and LAV-L)
- Amphibious Reconnaissance Battalion Fundamentals (mission, tasks, and training of Force Recon and Division Recon)

Furthermore, to finally qualify, a candidate is expected to perform a disassembly and reassembly of many of the taught weapon systems, operate a SINCGARS radio, plot various points on a map, perform various carries and life saving medical techniques, and in many cases perform (and pass) a Marine Corps Physical Fitness Test (PFT) and Combat Fitness Test (CFT).

Although this qualification is for enlisted personnel serving in the United States Navy, it is unique in that only Commanding Generals or Commanding Officers of qualifying U.S. Marine Corps commands (Division, Group, or Wing) can approve awarding of the designation. As such, to some corpsmen it is the most coveted warfare insignia within the hospital corpsman community.

The eagle, globe, and anchor (EGA) makes a clear statement that the wearer is a member of the Navy/Marine Corps team. The crossed rifles symbolize the rifleman ethic of the Marine Corps; every Marine is a rifleman, just as every Sailor is a firefighter and damage controlman aboard ship and submarine. The surf and sand represent the "littoral zone," the coastal regions where sailors have served alongside Marines as they earned their reputation and world's respect -- "the shores of Tripoli" and the "sands of Iwo Jima." The scroll at the bottom stating "Fleet Marine Force" shows the exclusive community they belong to.

== Officer ==
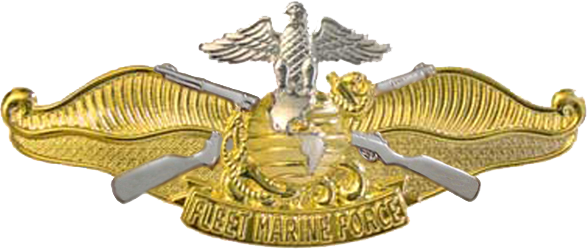
A highly polished gold and silver metal device depicting the eagle, globe and anchor atop two crossed rifles on a background of ocean swells breaking on a sandy beach and a scroll with the words "FLEET MARINE FORCE".

The Fleet Marine Force Warfare Officer (FMFWO) Insignia is earned by Navy officers assigned to the Fleet Marine Force of the U.S. Marine Corps who have completed the requirements including serving for one year in a Marine Corps command, completing a written test, passing the Marine PFT, and an oral board conducted by FMF qualified officers. The FMF Qualified Officer Insignia is most commonly earned by staff officers in the medical fields and chaplains, although it is also awarded to other officer communities, such as Civil Engineer Corps and naval gunfire officers. Florida Governor Ron DeSantis became FMF qualified while serving as a JAG officer.

The FMFWO insignia is a gold, highly polished, metal device depicting the eagle, globe and anchor (EGA) atop two crossed rifles on a background of ocean swells breaking on a sandy beach atop a scroll with the words "Fleet Marine Force."

The EGA makes a clear statement that the wearer is a member of the Navy/Marine Corps team. The crossed rifles symbolize the rifleman ethic of the Marine Corps; every marine is a rifleman, just as every sailor is a firefighter and damage controlman aboard ship and submarine. The surf and sand represent the "littoral zone," the coastal regions where sailors have served alongside Marines as they earned their reputation and world's respect -- "the shores of Tripoli" and the "sands of Iwo Jima." The eagle, continents, and rifles are highlighted with a highly polished silver finish. The qualification was created in July 2005; SECNAVINST 1412.10 outlines the requirements for qualification.

== Chaplain ==
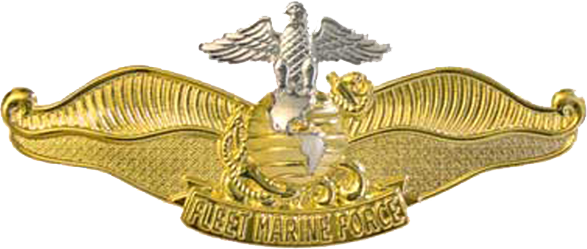

Chaplains do not bear arms; therefore, they are designated as Fleet Marine Force Qualified Officers vice Fleet Marine Force Warfare Officers, and are waived from completing certain [weapons related] portions of the Personnel Qualification Standards (PQS). The Chaplain version of this badge does not include the crossed rifles and has a gold anodized finish.

== Navy Fleet Marine Force Ribbon ==

As a result of the Fleet Marine Force Qualified Officer and Enlisted Fleet Marine Force Warfare Specialist programs, the Navy Fleet Marine Force Ribbon was replaced effective October 1, 2006.

Those individuals who previously qualified for the Navy Fleet Marine Force Ribbon will retain the FMF designator; however, they are not entitled to wear the EFMFWS insignia until completing another FMF assignment and meeting all requirements outlined in OPNAVINST 1414.4B.

== See also ==
- Fleet Marine Force (United States)
- Military badges of the United States
- Fleet Marine Force Combat Operation Insignia
- Fleet Marine Force Ribbon
- List of United States Navy enlisted warfare designations
- Badges of the United States Navy
- Obsolete badges of the United States military
- Uniforms of the United States Navy
