= Fleet Marine Force =

Operational command within the United States Marine Corps

- Seal of the Fleet Marine Force
- Founded: December 7, 1933
- Country: United States
- Branch: United States Marine Corps; United States Navy
- Type: Type Command
- Role: Amphibious, expeditionary, and aerial warfare

The United States Fleet Marine Forces (FMF) are combined general and special forces within the United States Department of the Navy that perform offensive amphibious or expeditionary warfare and defensive maritime employment. The Fleet Marine Forces provide the National Command Authority (NCA) with a responsive force that can conduct operations in any spectrum of conflict around the globe.

The organization originated as the Advanced Base Force in 1913, which became the East Coast Expeditionary Force in 1921, and then the Fleet Marine Force in 1933. Since World War II there have been two Fleet Marine Forces, the Pacific and Atlantic.

== History ==
The Fleet Marine Force (FMF) was established on 7 December 1933 by Secretary of the Navy Claude A. Swanson's General Order No. 241, which defined the organization and its relationship with the Navy, on the recommendation of the Major General Commandant of the Marine Corps, John H. Russell. This event was the culmination of the Marine Corps' development of amphibious warfare doctrine during the 1920s, and was described by historians as "the most significant development with in the Marine Corps." The development of the Fleet Marine Force was made possible by the research and training done by the Marine Corps Schools, and both were headquartered in Quantico, Virginia.

The first field command of the U.S. Marine Corps was the Advanced Base Force, created to defend the overseas naval bases established by the U.S. Navy. However, Marine forces were being used in offensive operations during the United States occupation of Haiti and Nicaragua. Because of the demands of World War I, where Marines fought in conventional land warfare, the Advanced Base Force no longer existed as of 1917. In 1916 the Marine Corps Gazette published an article by officers John H. Russel and John A. Lejeune (both future Commandants) advocating for the usage of Marines as part of a fleet Marine force, and in 1921 the East Coast and West Coast Expeditionary Forces were established as amphibious warfare units for offensive purposes and integrated with the U.S. Navy. The Marine Corps Schools at Quantico further developed the landing force doctrine based on lessons learned from the Gallipoli campaign of World War I, and in the early 1930s the Roosevelt administration ending the occupation of countries in Latin America freed up significant numbers of Marines from overseas duties. This allowed the East and West Expeditionary Forces to be expanded, culminating in the founding of the Fleet Marine Force in 1933. Unlike other previous iterations, the Fleet Marine Force would be a permanent formation that would not be disrupted by other tasks, and would be under the operational control of the Commander, United States Fleet. The Secretary of the Navy's order established the Fleet Marine Force as the force of marines maintained for operations with the U.S. Fleet, and falling under the command of the Commander, U.S. Fleet, when aboard Navy ships, while otherwise being led by the Commanding General, Fleet Marine Force, who was tasked with ensuring its readiness and efficiency. The Marine Corps kept the FMF and the "post troops" divided, with the latter focused on garrison, maintenance, and security duties so that the FMF could remain focused on amphibious landings. Marines were rotated between both to get experience in each task.

In the mid-1920s, the East Coast Expeditionary Force had about 3,000 personnel at Quantico, Virginia, with the exception of one battalion that was stationed at Guantanamo Bay. The West Coast Expeditionary Force was in San Diego, California, with about 1,200 men. Both were meant to be the nucleus of a much larger force in the event of a war, which would involve the entire Marine Corps and the Marine Corps Reserve. John Lejeune, as the Commandant of the Marine Corps, wrote in 1926 that the two expeditionary forces could be described as training centers during peacetime. The former Advanced Base Force became the East Coast Expeditionary Force in 1921, re-designated on Lejeune's orders, and in 1925 the West Coast Expeditionary Force was established at San Diego.

After 1933, the Fleet Marine Force was initially headquartered at Quantico and consisted of the 1st Marine Brigade, also stationed there, and the 2nd Marine Brigade in San Diego. Between 1934 and 1941, the Fleet Marine Force carried out several amphibious landing exercises, taking place off California, Hawaii, or Midway Island on the West Coast and in the Caribbean for the East Coast. In May 1935, the Marine Corps Schools published the Tentative Landing Operations Manual as a guide for Navy–Marine Corps landings against opposing forces, which was officially adopted by the Navy in 1938 as its doctrine for landing operations, and in August 1935 the headquarters of Fleet Marine Force was transferred to San Diego. In early 1941, with the start of World War II, the Fleet Marine Force was temporarily disbanded in favor of a two-division amphibious force assigned to each fleet, in the Pacific and the Atlantic. During 1941 a new organization was created under the command of Holland M. Smith, going through multiple name changes during the year. In June 1941 it was the (Provisional) I Corps, Atlantic Fleet, before becoming Task Force 18, Atlantic Fleet, and then 1st Joint Training Force in July, then the Atlantic Amphibious Force in August, and finally Amphibious Force, Atlantic Fleet, in October 1941. Holland remained in command and much of the year was spent training the Army division for amphibious purposes. The Fleet Marine Force became a training command in the United States. In November 1941, the 2nd Joint Training Force was created on the West Coast in San Diego, paralleling Smith's organization on the East Coast, with the Army taking the responsibility for amphibious training on the East Coast while the Marine Corps did so on the West Coast. In early 1942, the organization became the Amphibious Corps, Pacific Fleet, under General Clayton B. Vogel, who also became the commander of Fleet Marine Force, San Diego Area, in charge of training and the administration of Marine Corps bases there.

In September 1942, Holland Smith and his staff arrived on the West Coast when it became apparent that the amphibious warfare would be taking place in the Pacific. He took over as both the head of the Amphibious Corps, Pacific Fleet, and the Fleet Marine Force, San Diego Area, from Vogel. In this position, Smith was responsible for both the training and deployment of the Amphibious Corps with the Pacific Fleet, as well as the maintenance of Marine facilities and the organization of the Fleet Marine Force. In the spring of 1944, on the initiative of Lieutenant General Holland Smith, his duties as commander of V Amphibious Corps were expanded, and that summer the Headquarters, Fleet Marine Force, Pacific, was established as a new command. It included four Marine divisions in the theater, a Marine brigade nearly the size of a division, the 5th Marine Division being trained in the continental United States, and the supply service. These were eventually expanded, with FMF Pacific including the III Amphibious Corps and V Amphibious Corps, each consisting of three divisions and corps troops, and the commander of FMF Pacific also oversaw all of the supporting troops for the theater forces. The Fleet Marine Force, Pacific, essentially became a field army in 1944, while being a type command within the U.S. Pacific Fleet, with its Commanding General answering directly to the Commander-in-Chief, Pacific Fleet, and responsible for all organization and support of units under FMFPac, while also advising the Pacific Fleet commander on all matters related to the Marine Corps. Air units were designated as part of this structure as Aircraft, Fleet Marine Force, Pacific.

The headquarters of Fleet Marine Force, Pacific, was officially established on 17 September 1944. On 16 December 1946, the Fleet Marine Force, Atlantic, was established, serving a similar purpose for the U.S. Atlantic Fleet. By 1947, the Marine Corps had two Fleet Marine Forces: Pacific (FMFPac) and Atlantic (FMFLant). This structure still exists to this day, though in July 1992 the Marine Corps created two service component commands to represent Marine interests to their respective geographic unified combatant command, coinciding with the fleet marine force areas: U.S. Marine Corps Forces, Pacific (MARFORPAC) for the Pacific Command and Marine Corps Forces, Atlantic (MARFORLANT) for the Atlantic Command. The commanders of each MARFOR are dual-hatted as the commanding general of the respective fleet marine force. In December 2005, Marine Forces Atlantic was renamed Marine Corps Forces Command (MARFORCOM).

The Fleet Marine Force, San Diego Area, was tasked with training new recruits throughout the war, and in 1945 it became the Marine Training and Replacement Command.

== Commanding Generals ==
#	Name	Rank	Start of tenure	End of tenure	References	Notes
1	Charles H. Lyman II	Brigadier general	December 1933	September 1935		
2	Douglas C. McDougal	Brigadier general	September 1935	May 1937		
3	Louis M. Little	Major general	June 1937	September 1939		
4	William P. Upshur	Major general	September 1939	December 1941		
5	Clayton B. Vogel	Major general	December 1941	October 1942		Acting commander until 3 August 1942. Designated as the Commanding General, Fleet Marine Force, San Diego Area.
6	Holland M. Smith	Major general	October 1942	September 1943		Commanding General, Fleet Marine Force, San Diego Area.
(5)	Clayton B. Vogel	Major general	September 1943	April 1944		Commanding General, Fleet Marine Force, San Diego Area.
7	Charles F. B. Price	Major general	May 1944	October 1945		Commanding General, Fleet Marine Force, San Diego Area, which became the Marine Training and Replacement Command.

== Organization ==
The Fleet Marine Forces (FMF) consists of Marine Corps' operating forces components that constitute the Fleet Marine Forces on the Pacific and Atlantic coasts, or within its "designate(s)". While the FMF is a Marine Corps organization, the FMF is functionally equivalent to a type command and is therefore under the operational control of Navy fleet commanders; however, the Commandant of the Marine Corps (CMC) still retains administrative and training control.

The Commanding General of the Fleet Marine Force; either its Pacific (CG FMFPAC) or Atlantic (CG FMFLANT) command, are responsible for the administration and training of all of the subordinate units of the Marine Corps Forces (MARCORFOR). The subordinate units of the Fleet Marine Forces come under the operational control of the commanders, U.S. Fleet Forces Command (formerly Atlantic Fleet) or United States Pacific Fleet, when deployed.

The commanders of Marine Forces Command (MARFORCOM) and Pacific (MARFORPAC) serve as Marine Corps component commanders to their respective combatant commanders and may also serve as commanding generals of Fleet Marine Forces (FMFs) Atlantic, or Pacific.

The operating forces of the Marine Corps are currently organized into two Fleet Marine Forces (FMF):

- Fleet Marine Force, Pacific (FMFPAC) with headquarters in Honolulu, Hawaii
- Fleet Marine Force, Atlantic (FMFLANT) with headquarters in Norfolk, Virginia.

Each FMF is equivalent to a U.S. Navy type command and reports to its respective Fleet Commander-in-Chief. The commanding general—a lieutenant general—may be either an aviator or a ground officer. His deputy commanding general is from the other community.

Marine Corps forces are organized into warfighting units of combined arms known as Marine Air Ground Task Forces (MAGTFs) and are either employed as part of naval expeditionary forces or separately as part of larger joint or combined forces.

Each FMF consists of at least one Marine Expeditionary Force (MEF) consisting of at least one Marine Division (MARDIV), one Marine Aircraft Wing (MAW), one Marine Logistics Group (MLG) (formerly the Force Service Support Group (FSSG)), and an MEF Information Group. Other miscellaneous supporting units may be attached. In addition to one or more MEF(s), each FMF is further organized into one or more intermediate-sized MAGTFs called Marine Expeditionary Brigades (MEBs) and smaller MAGTFs called Marine Expeditionary Units (MEUs).

== Navy personnel in the Fleet Marine Forces ==
Fleet Marine Force Enlisted Warfare Specialist Device.

For service in the Fleet Marine Force, the United States Department of the Navy issues the FMF Enlisted Warfare Specialist Insignia and the FMF Qualified Officer Insignia (formerly, the Fleet Marine Force Ribbon was issued). Navy Fleet Marine Force personnel, usually Medical Officers (i.e. physicians), Corpsmen, Religious Program Specialists, Logistics Specialists, Master at Arms or Naval Gunfire Liaison Officers who participate in amphibious assaults, are also eligible to receive the FMF Combat Operations Insignia to certain service medals and ribbons. Such Navy personnel are authorized to wear the Marine Corps utility uniform with Navy insignia, and must conform to all physical requirements of the U.S. Marines.

== See also ==
- Marine Air-Ground Task Force Reconnaissance
- Marine Detachment
- Naval Expeditionary Combat Command
- Organization of the United States Marine Corps
- 1st Naval Construction Division
- United States Navy Amphibious Reconnaissance Corpsman
- United States Navy Hospital Corpsman
