= Fleet Marine Force Combat Operation Insignia =

US Marine Corps emblem

- Type: Ribbon device
- Awarded for: Engaging in active combat action with an armed enemy during the sailor's service with FMF units
- Sponsored by: United States Navy
- Status: Currently awarded
- Established: 1953

The Fleet Marine Force Combat Operation Insignia is a miniature 5/16 inch bronze United States Marine Corps emblem that may be authorized by the Secretary of the Navy for wear on specific campaign, expeditionary, and service medal ribbons issued to United States Navy sailors attached to and on duty with Fleet Marine Force (FMF) units during combat operations and sailors on duty with Navy units attached to and operating with Fleet Marine Force units while under Marine Corps operational control during combat operations. The device was instituted in 1953 with the Navy and Marine Corps Award Manual (NAVPERS 15,790, Revised 1953) dated 1953.

== Criteria and wear ==
The Fleet Marine Force Combat Operation Insignia (FMFCOI) must be authorized by the Marine Corps unit commander in order to be worn by U.S. Navy sailors such as hospital corpsmen, religious program specialist, and chaplains assigned to Marine Corps units and Seabees assigned to naval units operating with Marine Corps units. The Marine Corps unit and sailor must have engaged in active combat action with an armed enemy during the sailor's service with the Marine Corps unit, or the sailor and the Navy unit must have engaged in active combat action with an armed enemy during the Navy unit's operating service with the Marine Corps unit. No more than one Marine Corps emblem may be worn on the ribbons.

The FMFCOI is positioned in the center of both the suspension ribbon and service ribbon of the medal. Any other authorized ribbon device such as the 3/16 inch service star or campaign star, are placed on either side of the FMF combat operation insignia, with the first star on the wearer's right of the insignia, the second star on the wearer's left of the insignia, and so on.

The FMFCOI is or was authorized to be worn on the following medals -

Currently awarded:

- Armed Forces Expeditionary Medal
- Global War on Terrorism Expeditionary Medal
- Inherent Resolve Campaign Medal

Previously awarded:

Afghanistan Campaign Medal ribbon with
FMF Combat Operation Insignia
and 3/16" bronze campaign star

- Asiatic-Pacific Campaign Medal
- European-African-Middle Eastern Campaign Medal
- Korean Service Medal
- Vietnam Service Medal
- Southwest Asia Service Medal
- Kosovo Campaign Medal
- Afghanistan Campaign Medal
- Iraq Campaign Medal

== Notable recipients ==
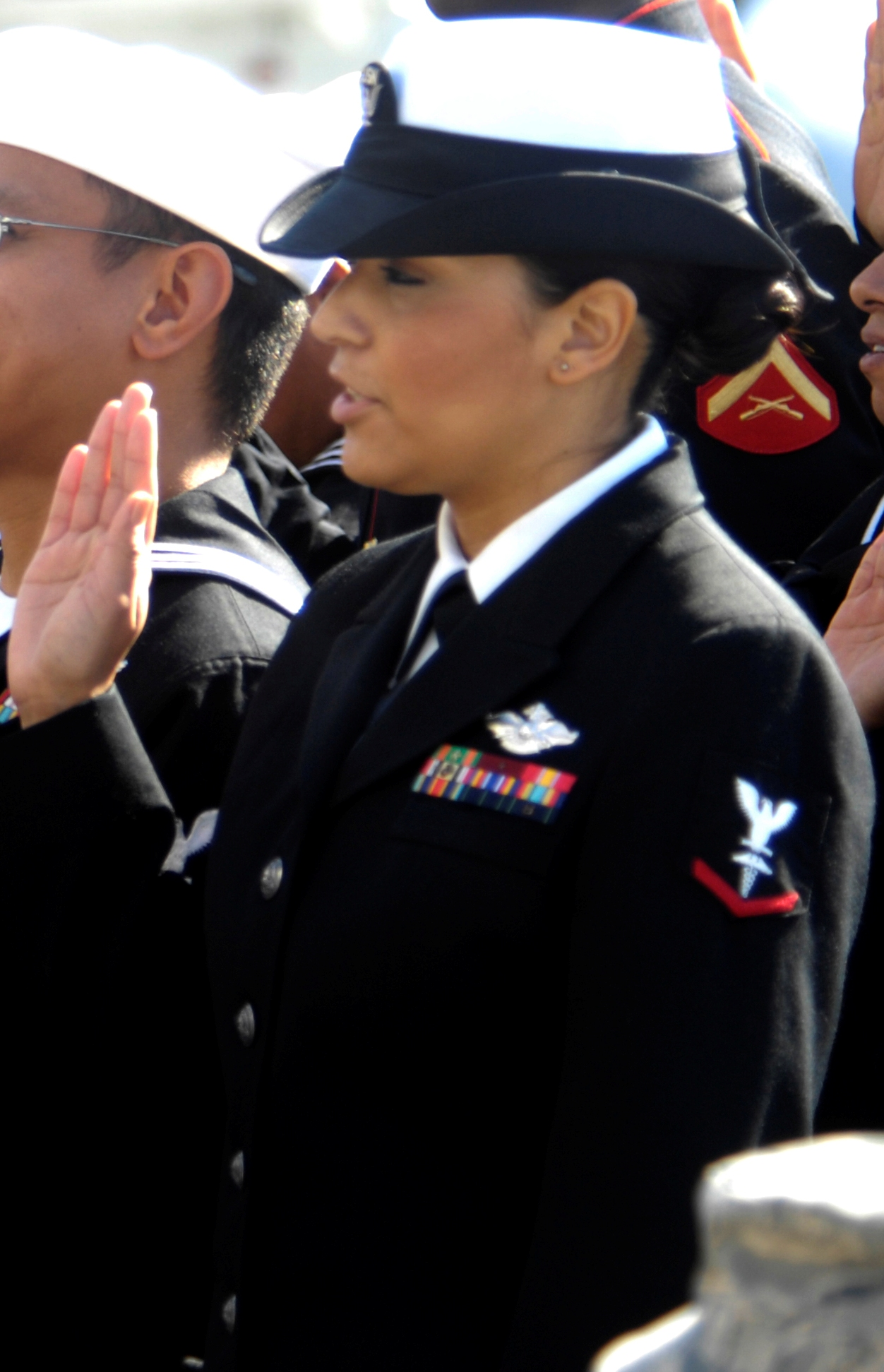
A hospital corpsman in 2010 wearing the Fleet Marine Force enlisted warfare insignia and an Iraq Campaign Medal with the Fleet Marine Force Combat Operation Insignia pinned on it.

=== Medal of Honor recipients ===
==== Navy chaplains ====
Vietnam War:

- Vincent R. Capodanno

==== Navy hospital corpsmen ====
World War II

- Robert Eugene Bush
- William D. Halyburton, Jr.
- Fred F. Lester
- Francis J. Pierce
- George E. Wahlen
- Jack Williams
- John H. Willis

Korean War

- Edward C. Benfold
- William R. Charette
- Richard D. Dewert
- Francis C. Hammond
- John E. Kilmer

Vietnam War

- Donald E. Ballard
- Wayne M. Caron
- Robert R. Ingram
- David R. Ray
- Stanley A. Packauski

== See also ==
- Seabees
- United States military award devices
- Awards and decorations of the United States military
