= Afghanistan Campaign Medal =

Military award of the U.S. Armed Forces

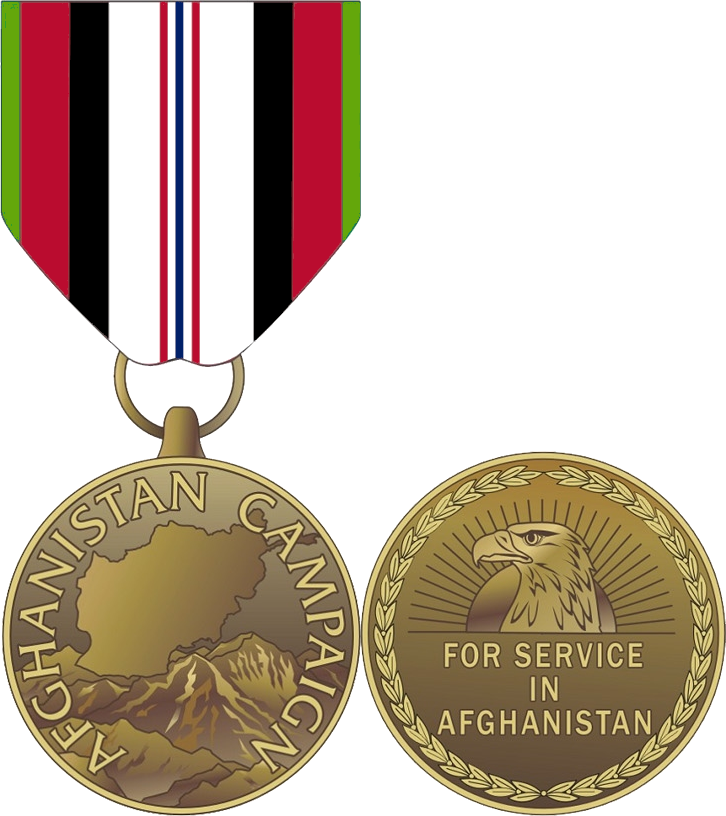
- Obverse and reverse
- Type: Military medal Campaign medal
- Awarded for: Service in Afghanistan from October 24, 2001 to August 31, 2021.
- Presented by: the U.S. Department of Defense and Department of Homeland Security
- Eligibility: U.S. military personnel
- Status: Inactive
- Established: EO 13363, November 29, 2004; 21 years ago
- First award: June 2005 (retroactive to October 24, 2001)
- Final award: 31 August 2021
- Service ribbon and campaign streamer

Precedence
- Next (higher): Kosovo Campaign Medal
- Next (lower): Iraq Campaign Medal
- Related: Global War on Terrorism Expeditionary Medal; NATO Medal

The Afghanistan Campaign Medal (ACM) was a military award of the United States Armed Forces which was created by Executive Order 13363 of President George W. Bush on November 29, 2004, and became available for general distribution in June 2005. The medal was designed by the U.S. Army Institute of Heraldry.

The Afghanistan Campaign Medal is awarded to any member of the United States military who has performed duty within the borders of Afghanistan (or its airspace) for a period of thirty consecutive days or sixty non-consecutive days. The medal is retroactive to October 24, 2001, and was active until the conclusion of Operation Allies Refuge on August 31, 2021. Personnel who have been engaged in combat with an enemy force, or personnel who have been wounded in combat within Afghanistan, may receive the ACM regardless of the number of days spent within the country. The medal was also awarded posthumously to any service member who died in the line of duty within Afghanistan, including from non-combat injuries such as accidents and mishaps.

== Campaign phases and devices ==
The following are the approved campaign phases and respective dates for the Afghanistan Campaign Medal:

Phase	From	To
Liberation of Afghanistan	September 11, 2001	November 30, 2001
Consolidation I	December 1, 2001	September 30, 2006
Consolidation II	October 1, 2006	November 30, 2009
Consolidation III	December 1, 2009	June 30, 2011
Transition I	July 1, 2011	December 31, 2014
Transition II (Note 1)	January 1, 2015	August 31, 2021
Note 1: For Operation FREEDOM's SENTINEL pursuant to USD(P&R) memorandum dated February 13, 2015, titled, "Afghanistan Campaign Medal – Operation FREEDOM’s SENTINEL and Transition II Campaign Phase."

Examples of campaign stars worn on the Afghanistan Campaign Medal service ribbon:

One of the six phases
Two of the six phases
Three of the six phases
Four of the six phases
Five of the six phases
All six phases

The following ribbon devices are authorized for wear on the Afghanistan Campaign Medal:

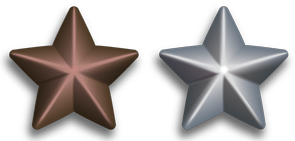
- Campaign stars (all branches)
- Arrowhead device (Army, Air Force, and Space Force)
- Fleet Marine Force Combat Operation Insignia (Navy personnel assigned to a Marine Corps unit in combat)

== Global War on Terrorism Expeditionary Medal ==
The Afghanistan Campaign Medal replaces the Global War on Terrorism Expeditionary Medal (GWOT-EM) for service in Afghanistan and personnel who previously received the GWOT-EM for Afghanistan service may elect to exchange the medal for the ACM. Both medals may not be received for the same period of service in Afghanistan and any current Afghanistan service will only be recognized with the Afghanistan Campaign Medal.

== See also ==
- Awards and decorations of the United States military
- United Kingdom Afghanistan medal
