= Naval gunfire liaison officer =

U.S. Navy officer assisting infantry personnel requiring naval gunfire support

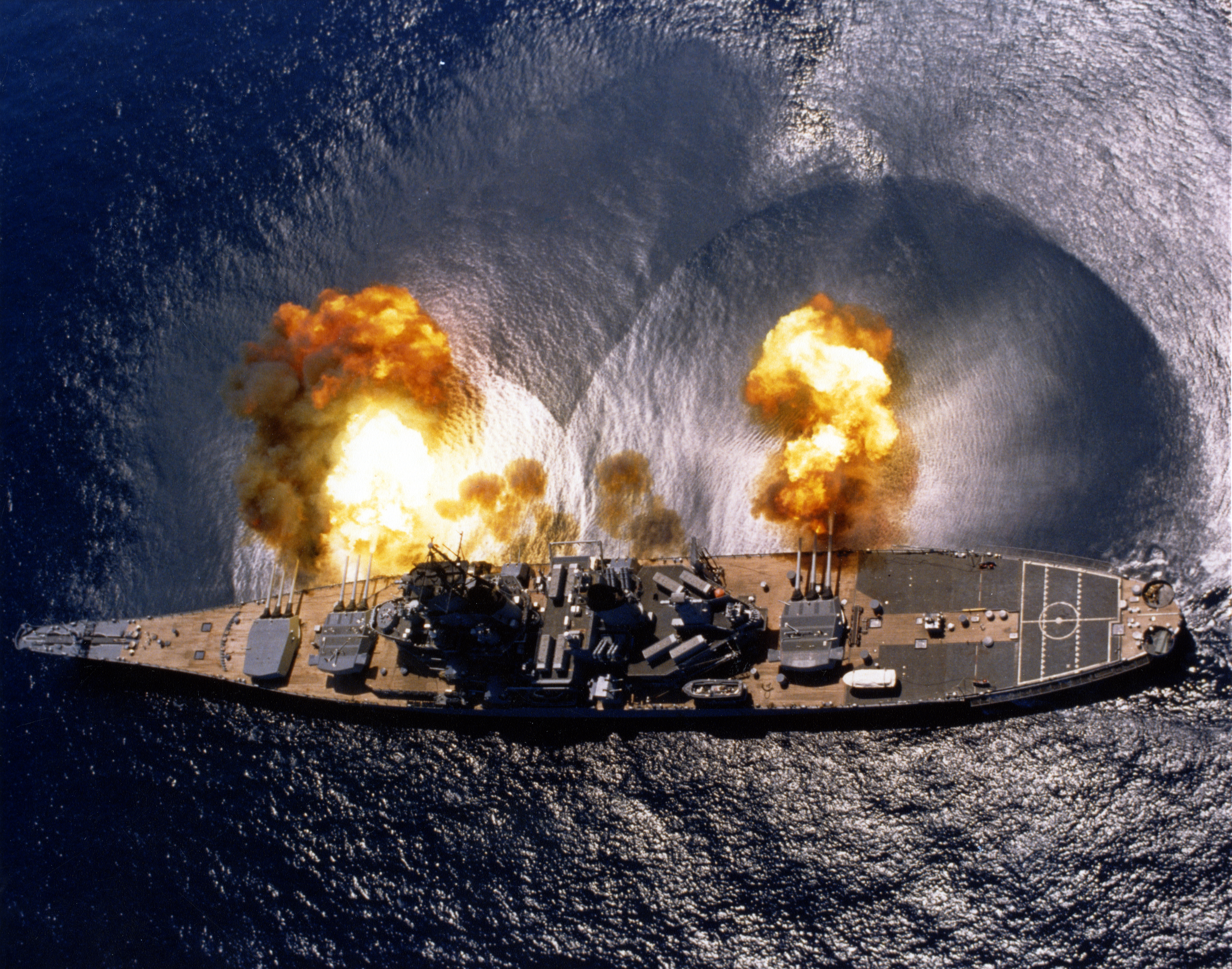
Naval gunfire liaison officers assist infantry in effective utilization of naval gunfire support.

The naval gunfire liaison officer (NGLO) is a U.S. Navy officer or non-commissioned officer (typically a lieutenant junior grade (LTJG), lieutenant (LT) unrestricted line officer or NCO E5 or above) who assists infantry personnel requiring naval gunfire support. The mission was defined during World War II amphibious warfare, and these personnel remain an important coordination point for effective utilization of naval guns by troops ashore.

== History ==
United States Marine Corps Lieutenant Colonel Earl Ellis 1921 prediction of Pacific island warfare with Japan prompted publication of a Tentative Manual for Landing Operations in 1934. Naval gunfire support was the second of six major elements of the manual. The Gallipoli Campaign had revealed fundamental difficulties in using shipboard guns for troop support. The trajectory of high velocity naval artillery was significantly different from field artillery howitzers typically used for gunfire support. Infantry officers were surprised by the inability of flat trajectory naval guns to hit targets behind low hills; and the relatively wide distribution of fall of shot along the axis of fire sometimes endangered friendly troops behind or in front of the target. Shells intended to penetrate armored ships produced a relatively small damage radius against unfortified targets; and shipboard observation devices designed to observe shell splashes at sea were unable to determine whether their shells were striking intended shore targets.

Although Marine Corps officers who have served aboard warships are more familiar with naval artillery, Army officers without such experience are often in positions requiring gunfire support during amphibious landings. Naval officers familiar with shipboard guns are able to advise infantry officers ashore concerning the capabilities of naval artillery to engage specific targets. The naval officer's familiarity with shipboard communications systems enables him to translate the infantry objectives and fall of shot observations to the appropriate shipboard personnel for effective engagement of targets. The tentative manual of 1934 became Fleet Training Publication 167 in 1938; and the Army issued a field manual with virtually identical text in 1941.

== Modern practice ==
NGLOs are assigned to a marine artillery battalion or marine artillery regiment to assist in providing naval gunfire support. When deploying as part of a marine expeditionary unit, the NGLO is typically attached to the Operations Section (S-3) of the Ground Combat Element and is responsible for a shore fire control party consisting of RT operators and forward observers.

While NGLOs are trained to spot naval gunfire, their primary responsibilities are in the Fire Support Coordination Center to plan and coordinate naval gunfire with other firing agencies (artillery, close air support, and mortars) in conjunction with the fire support coordinator and fire support team leaders, and advise him on its employment. NGLOs can also be assigned to air naval gunfire liaison companies (ANGLICO), or the various marine expeditionary force or division headquarters staff.

Specific training consists of the Naval Gunfire Liaison Officer Course, a five-week resident course taught in Coronado, California. NGLOs assigned to ANGLICO units may receive further training as joint terminal attack controllers (JTACs) at the discretion of the assigned unit and are jump qualified.

== Uniform ==
See: Navy personnel attached to Marine Corps units
