= Hospital corpsman =

U.S. Navy enlisted medical specialist

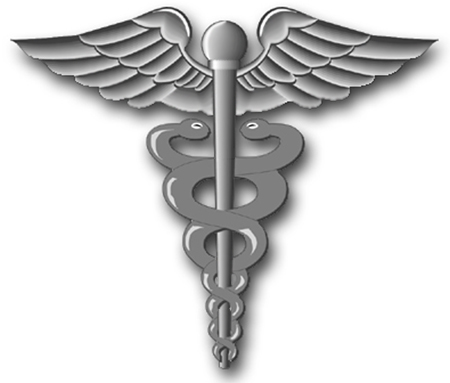
- Rating insignia
- Issued by: United States Navy
- Type: Enlisted rating
- Abbreviation: HM
- Specialty: Medical

A hospital corpsman (HM) or corpsman (/ˈkɔːrmən/ CORE-man) is an enlisted medical specialist of the United States Navy, who may also serve in a U.S. Marine Corps unit. The corresponding rating within the United States Coast Guard is Health Services Technician (HS). The U.S. Navy Hospital Corps was created on 17 June 1898, with hospital corpsman used as a generic name for the applicable personnel while various other official names (including hospital apprentice, hospital steward, pharmacist's mate) were used for the rating; after World War II, hospital corpsman became the official name for the rating.

== Overview ==
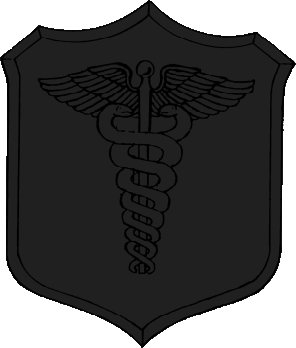
Small metallic badge affixed to the left side of the MCCUU collar when worn by corpsmen; it was previously worn on the BDU and DCU

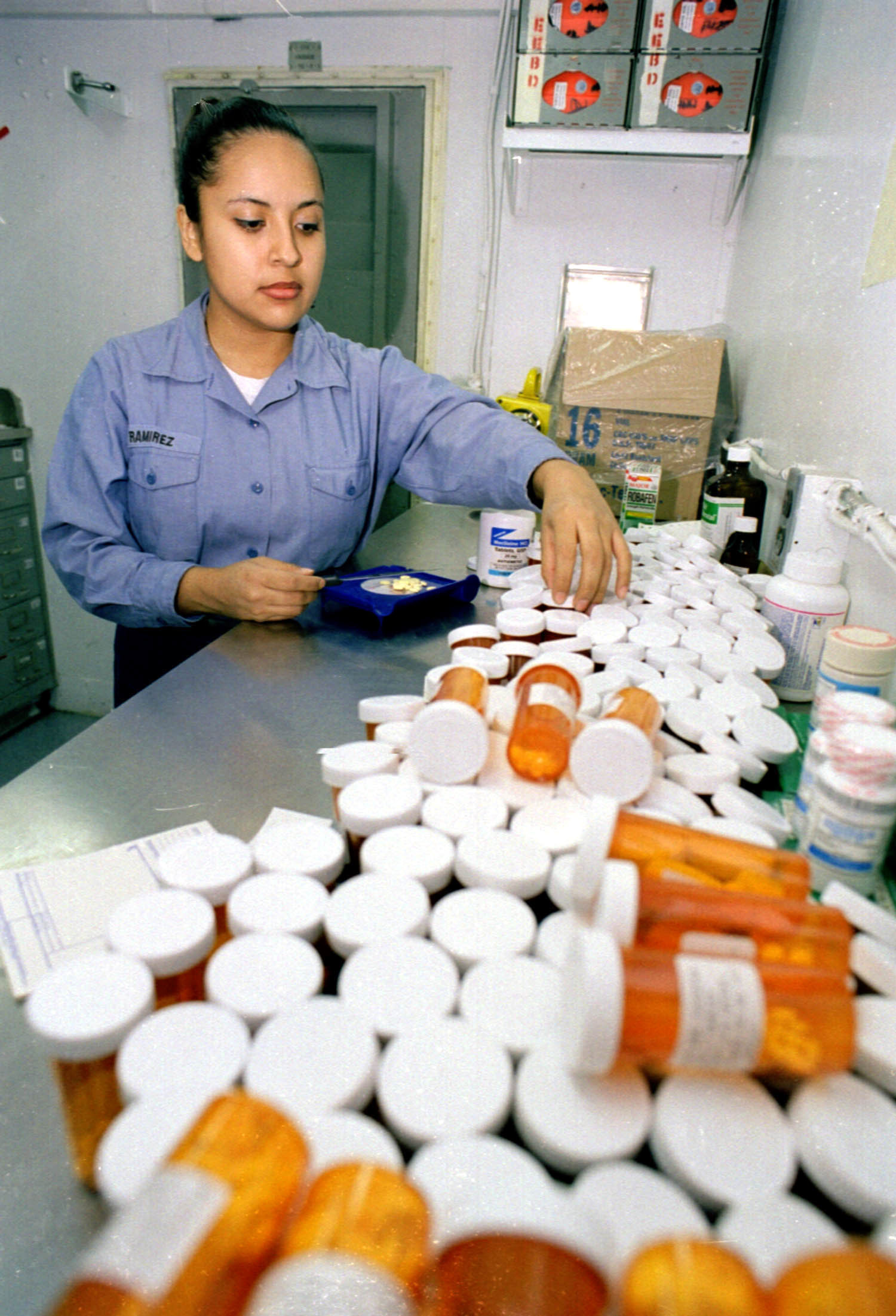
A corpsman aboard an aircraft carrier in 1999

Hospital corpsmen work in a wide variety of capacities and locations, including shore establishments such as naval hospitals and clinics, aboard ships, and as the primary medical caregivers for sailors while underway. Hospital corpsmen are frequently the only medical care-giver available in many fleet or Marine units on extended deployment. In addition, hospital corpsmen perform duties as assistants in the prevention and treatment of disease and injury and assist health care professionals in providing medical care to sailors and their families.

They may function as clinical or specialty technicians, medical administrative personnel and health care providers at medical treatment facilities. They also serve as battlefield corpsmen with the Marine Corps, rendering emergency medical treatment to include initial treatment in a combat environment. Qualified hospital corpsmen may be assigned the responsibility of independent duty aboard ships and submarines, Fleet Marine Force, SEAL and Seabee units, and at isolated duty stations where no medical officer is available.

Hospital corpsmen were previously trained at Naval Hospital Corps School, Great Lakes, Illinois, and the U.S. Naval Hospital Corps School San Diego, California, until the 2011 Base Realignment and Closure Bill caused Hospital Corps School to be relocated to the Medical Education and Training Campus (METC) at Joint Base San Antonio, Texas. Naval Hospital Corps School was also located at NRMC Balboa in San Diego, California.

During the Vietnam War, many of the 16-week Naval Hospital Corps school graduates went directly to 8404 Field Medical Service School (FMSS) at Camp Lejeune, North Carolina, or Camp Pendleton, California, for nine weeks of field training, before deployment to a Marine Corps unit in South Vietnam.

In the United States Marine Corps, the colloquial form of address for a Hospital Corpsman who rate to wear the Navy's Fleet Marine Force (FMF) warfare device (showing they were or are attached to an FMF Unit) is "Doc", which is generally used as a sign of respect. Hospital Corpsman who are not authorized to wear the device would still be referred to by their rate and rank.

== History ==
Prior to the establishment of the hospital corps in 1898, enlisted medical support in the U.S. Navy was limited in scope. In the Continental Navy and the early U.S. Navy, medical assistants were assigned at random out of the ship's company. Their primary duties were to keep the irons hot and buckets of sand at the ready for the operating area. It was commonplace during battle for the surgeons to conduct amputations and irons were used to close lacerations and wounds. Sand was used to keep the surgeon from slipping on the bloody ship deck. Previously, corpsmen were commonly referred to as loblolly boys, a term borrowed from the Royal Navy, and a reference to the daily ration of porridge fed to the sick. The nickname was in common use for so many years that it was finally officially recognized by the Navy Regulations of 1814. In coming decades, the title of the enlisted medical assistant would change several times—from loblolly boy, to nurse (1861), and finally to bayman (1876). A senior enlisted medical rating, surgeon's steward, was introduced in 1841 and remained through the Civil War. Following the war, the title surgeon's steward was abolished in favor of apothecary, a position requiring completion of a course in pharmacy.

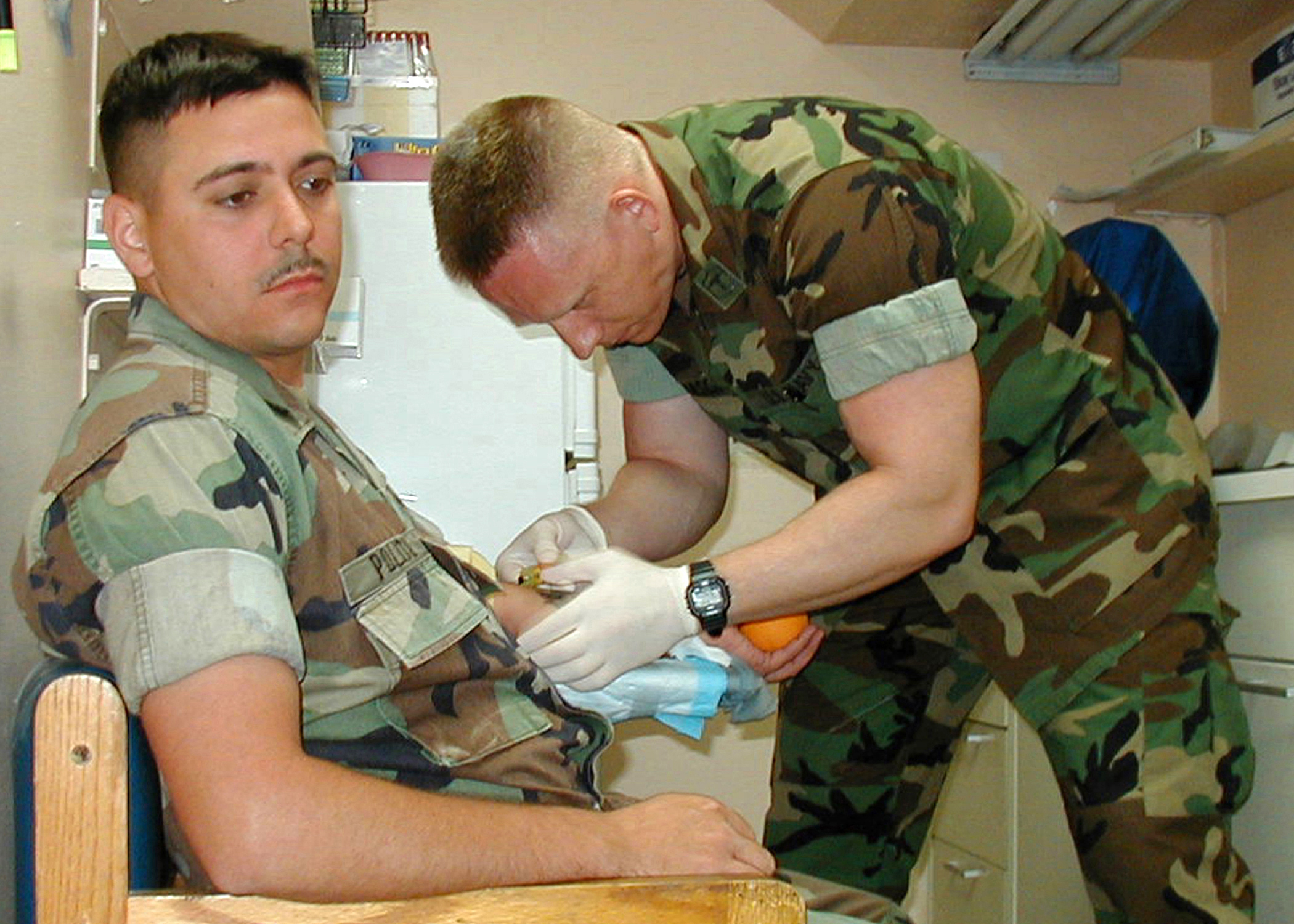
A hospital corpsman draws blood from a patient as part of his duties as an independent duty corpsman

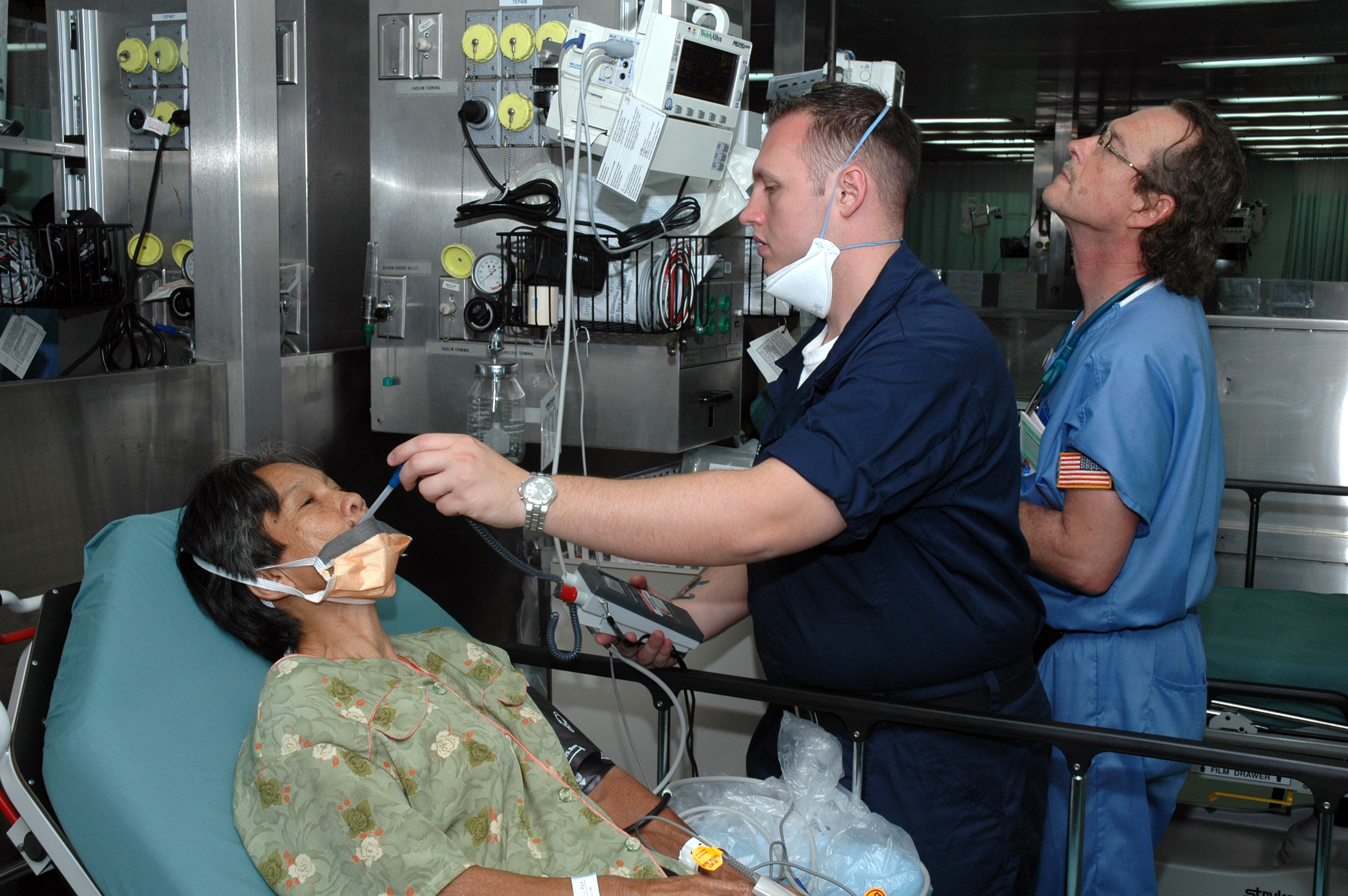
A corpsman takes a patient's temperature in 2006

Still, there existed pressure to reform the enlisted component of the Navy's medical department—medicine as a science was advancing rapidly, foreign navies had begun training medically skilled sailors, and the U.S. Army had established an enlisted hospital corps in 1887. Navy Surgeon General J.R. Tryon and subordinate physicians lobbied the Navy administration to take action. With the Spanish–American War looming, Congress passed a bill authorizing establishment of the U.S. Navy Hospital Corps, signed into law by President William McKinley on 17 June 1898. Three ratings were created therein—hospital apprentice, hospital apprentice first class (a petty officer third class), and hospital steward, which was a chief petty officer.

A revision in 1916 established a new rate structure. With the introduction of a second junior rate there were now hospital apprentice second class (HA2c) and hospital apprentice first class (HA1c). The rating title for petty officers was established as pharmacist's mate (PhM), following the pattern of some of the Navy's other ratings (boatswain's mate, gunner's mate, etc.). Pharmacist's mate third class (PhM3c), second class (PhM2c), and first class (PhM1c) were now the petty officers, and chief pharmacist's mate (CPhM) was the chief petty officer. This structure remained in place until 1947.

A total of 684 personal awards were awarded to hospital corpsmen, including 23 Medals of Honor, 55 Navy Crosses, and 237 Silver Stars. During World War I, hospital corpsmen served throughout the fleet, earning particular distinction on the Western Front with the Marine Corps.

In the United States Navy in World War II, hospital corpsmen assigned to Marine units made beach assaults with the marines in every battle in the Pacific. Corpsmen also served on thousands of ships and submarines. Three unassisted emergency appendectomies were performed by hospital corpsmen serving undersea and beyond hope of medical evacuation. The hospital corps has the distinction of being the only corps in the U.S. Navy to be commended, in a famous speech by Secretary of the Navy James Forrestal after the conclusion of the war.

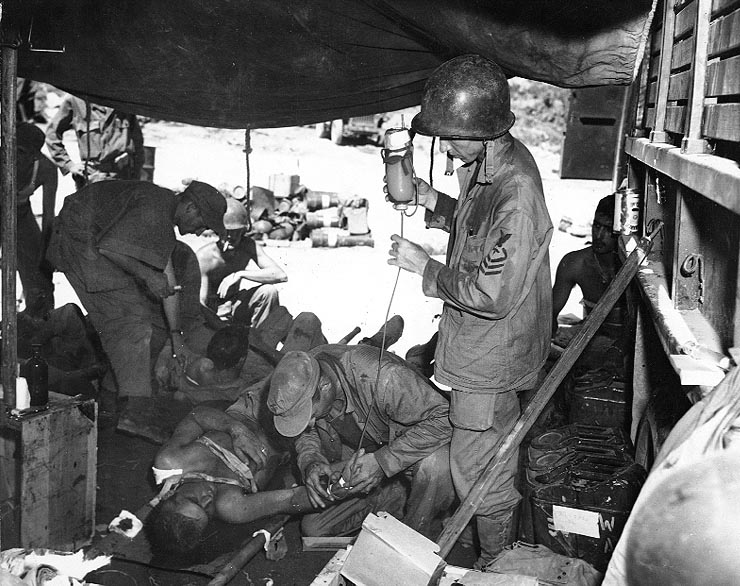
A Fleet Marine Force corpsman treats a patient at the Battle of Naktong Bulge in Korea, in 1950

Following the war, the hospital corps changed its rating title to the generic term it had used all along—hospital corpsman. The rates of hospital corpsman third class (HM3), second class (HM2), and first class (HM1), and chief hospital corpsman (HMC) were supplemented by senior chief hospital corpsman (HMCS) and master chief hospital corpsman (HMCM) in 1958.

Hospital corpsmen continued to serve at sea and ashore, and accompanied marines and Marine units into battle during the Korean and Vietnam wars. Fifteen hospital corpsmen were counted among the dead following the bombing of the Marine barracks in Beirut in 1983. Hospital corpsmen also served in the Iraq and Afghanistan wars providing corpsmen for convoys, patrols, and hospital or clinic treatment.

Whether they are assigned to hospital ships, reservist installations, recruiter offices, or Marine Corps combat units, the rating of hospital corpsman is the most decorated in the United States Navy and the most decorated job in the U.S. military, with 22 Medals of Honor, 179 Navy Crosses since World War I, 31 Navy Distinguished Service Medals, 959 Silver Stars, and more than 1,600 Bronze Star Medal's with combat V's for heroism since World War II (as of 2016). Twenty naval ships have been named after hospital corpsmen. Prior to selection to the command master chief program, the 11th MCPON, Joe R. Campa, was a hospital corpsman.

On 29 September 2016, the Secretary of the Navy Ray Mabus terminated the corpsman rating along with all other U.S. Navy enlisted ratings. However, in late December 2016, the usage of ratings were restored by the Navy after much backlash by many in the enlisted naval ranks.

== Navy and Marine Corps training ==
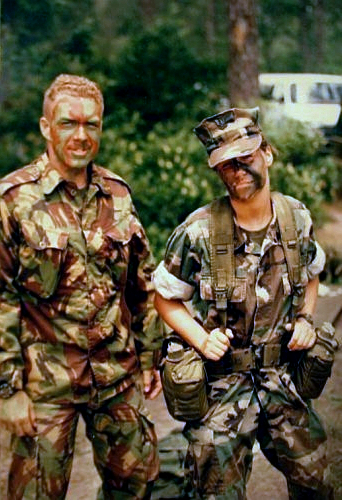
Bermuda Regiment corporal and U.S. Navy corpsman at USMCB Camp Lejeune, 1994. The corpsman is assigned to the Bermuda Regiment from her station at the infirmary on U.S. NAS Bermuda.

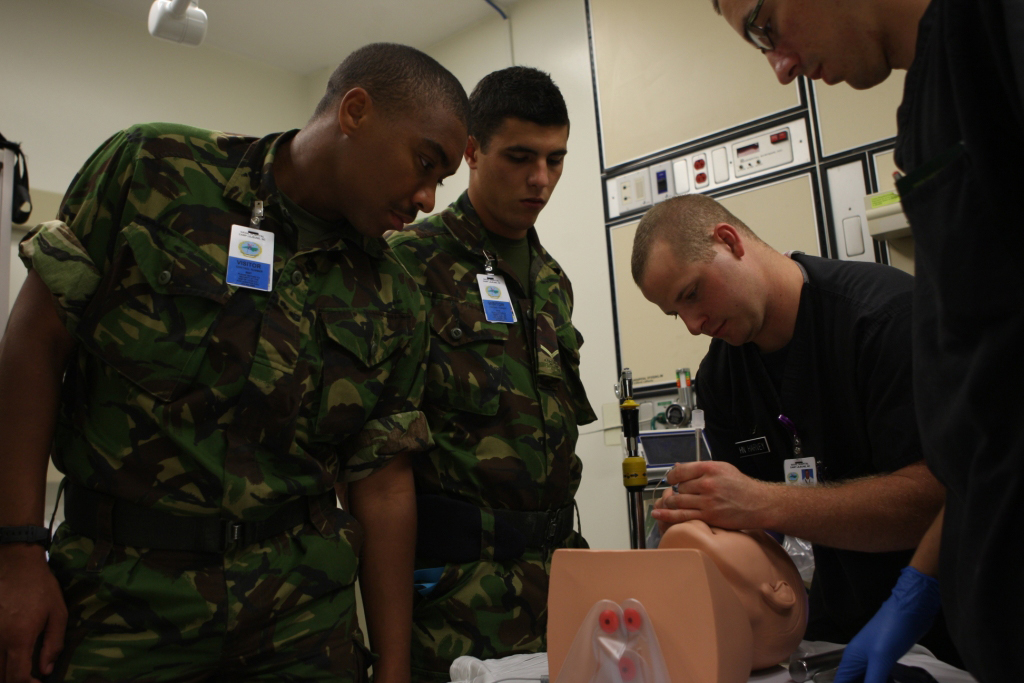
Bermuda Regiment medics and U.S. Navy corpsmen at Camp Lejeune in May 2011.

As of April 2011, training to become a hospital corpsman began at Basic Medical Technician Corpsman Program (BMTCP) located at Joint Base Fort Sam Houston in San Antonio, Texas.

Because of the need for hospital corpsmen in a vast array of foreign, domestic, and shipboard duty stations, as well as with United States Marine Corps units, the hospital corps is the largest occupational rating (Navy Enlisted Classification-HM) in the United States Navy, with about 25,000 members active duty and reserve.

The basic training for hospital corpsmen is conducted at the Medical Education and Training Campus, located in Texas at a joint military base. Originally one of the Navy's "A" schools (primary rating training). Upon graduation, the hospital corpsman is given the Navy Enlisted Classification (NEC) code of HM-0000, or "quad-zero" in common usage. Students go through a 14-week course that provides in-depth and extensive training into the application of emergency medical techniques, disease and pathologies, and nursing techniques.

NECs are not as analogous to MOS in the United States Army and Marine Corps, or AFSC in the Air Force as the rating in the Navy. There are primary NECs, and secondary NECs. For example, a hospital corpsman who completes Field Medical Training Battalion (FMTB) and earns the NEC HM-L03A, moves that NEC to primary and has a secondary NEC of HM-0000. If that hospital corpsman attends a "C" School, then the NEC earned at the "C" School becomes their primary and HM-L03A becomes the secondary. Some hospital corpsmen go on to receive more specialized training in roles such as medical laboratory technician, optometry technician, radiology technician, aerospace medicine specialist, pharmacy technician, operating room technician, etc. This advanced education is done through "C" schools, which confer 39 additional NECs. Additionally, hospital corpsmen (E-5 and above) may attend independent duty corpsman training, qualifying for independent duty in surface ships and submarines, with diving teams, and Fleet Marine Force Recon teams, as well as at remote shore installations. In addition to advanced medical training, these hospital corpsmen receive qualification in sanitation and public health.

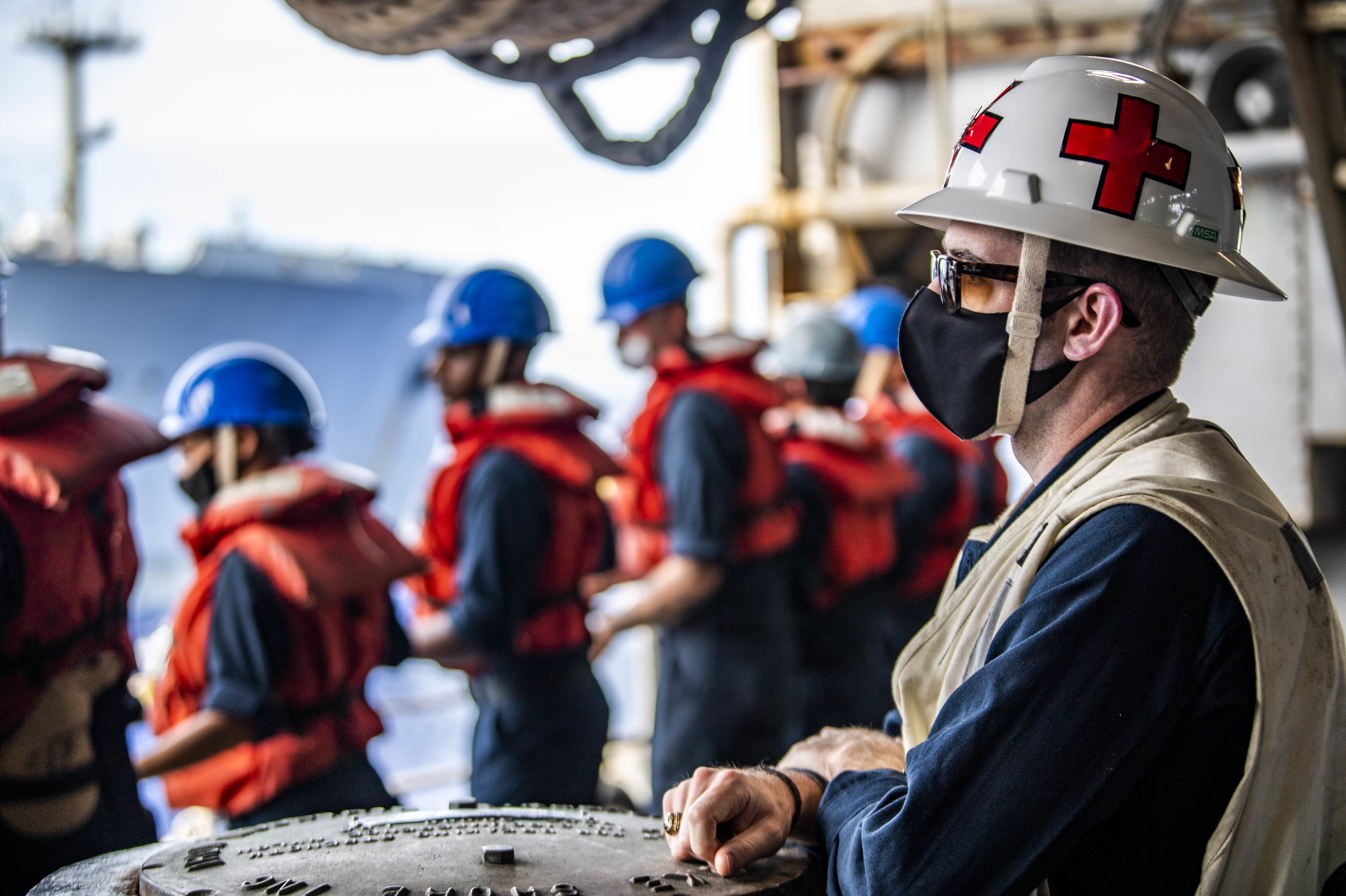
In September 2020, Philippine Sea, Hospital Corpsman 2nd Class Shelby Sparks aboard the amphibious dock landing ship USS Germantown (LSD 42)

The Field Medical Training Battalion (FMTB) provides specialized training in advanced emergency medicine and the fundamentals of Marine Corps life, while emphasizing physical conditioning, small arms familiarity, and basic battlefield tactics. FMTB locations are at Camp Pendelton and Camp Johnson, where sailors bound for service with USMC operating forces earn the NEC HM-L03A (formerly 8404), Field Medical Service Technician. As of 2010, this rigorous training is 8 weeks. Training for the Fleet Marine Force (FMF) familiarizes navy corpsmen with the Marines. A bond and mutual respect is often formed between Marines and their assigned hospital corpsmen, earning respect apart from their Navy shipmates. FMF hospital corpsmen are issued the Marine Corps service uniforms and camouflage uniforms (MARPAT) while assigned to the Marine Corps and also have the option to go Marine Corps Regulations. They are then issued a new seabag containing the Marine uniforms (except dress blues) with uniform matching Navy rate chevrons instead of the Marine rank chevrons, and collar rank insignias, and wear those instead of traditional Navy uniforms. The Navy's new digitized camouflage working uniform are worn by sailors stationed at other naval facilities. Hospital corpsmen going to units within NECC (Navy Expeditionary Combat Command) such as Seabees, Riverines (Now called MSRON), and Explosive Ordnance Disposal (EOD) also have to go to FMTB.

Hospital corpsmen can further specialize; they may undergo further training to become Special Amphibious Reconnaissance Corpsmen, or SARC. They are usually found in both the FMF Recon, Marine Division Recon and MARSOC units. They are trained and skilled in combat, including combatant swimming, opened/closed circuit scuba diving, military free-fall and amphibious operations. They act as advisers regarding health and injury prevention, and treat illnesses from decompression sickness as well as other conditions requiring hyperbaric treatment.

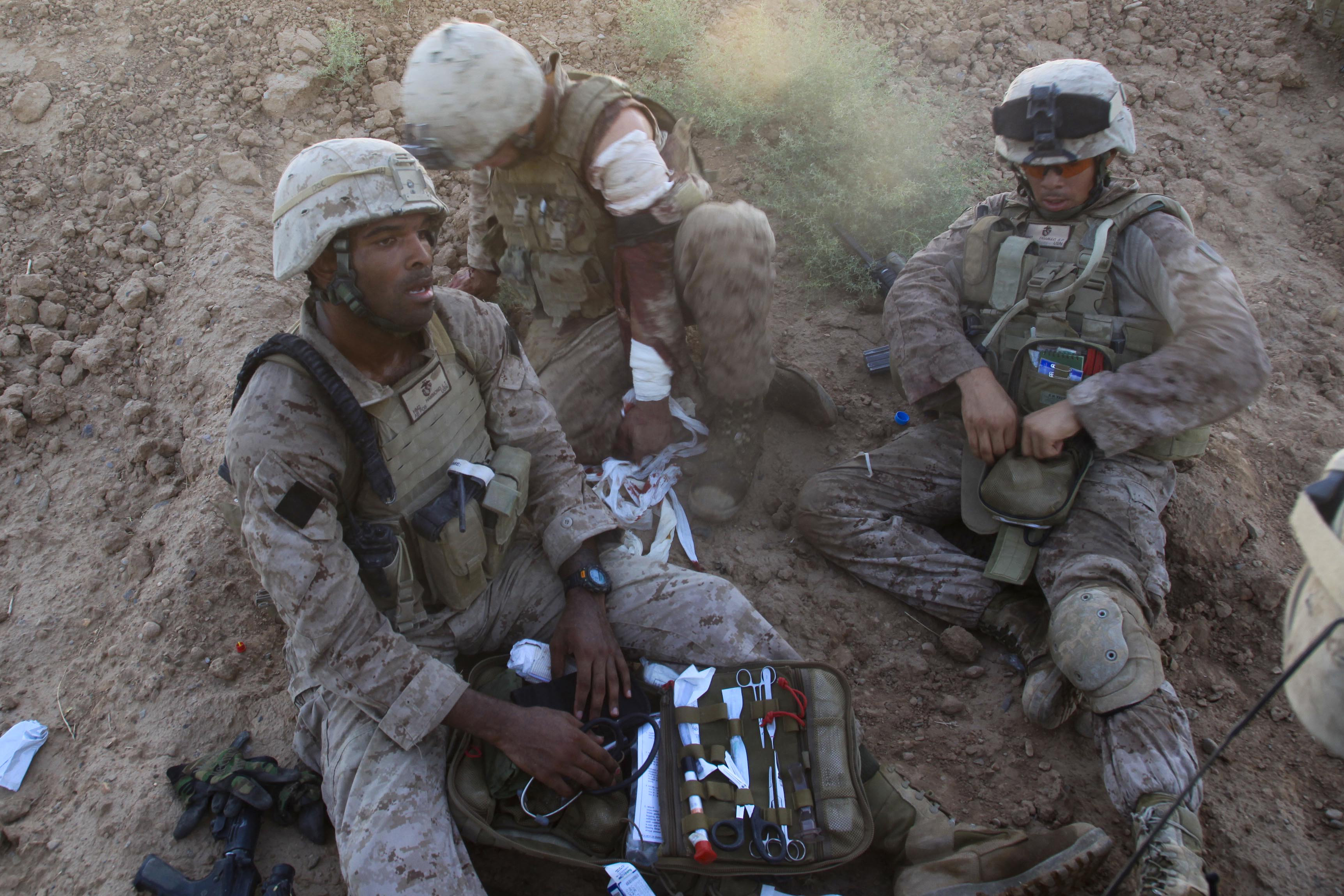
Two hospital corpsmen assigned to the 1st Battalion, 5th Marines, treat a Marine wounded in Afghanistan in 2009. Both corpsman would later be awarded the Bronze Star Medal with Combat "V".

Hospital corpsmen who have received the warfare designator of enlisted fleet marine force warfare specialist are highly trained members of the Hospital Corps who specialize in all aspects of working with the United States Marine Corps operating forces. Attainment of this designation is highly prized among all corpsmen. The enlisted fleet marine force warfare designation for hospital corpsmen is the only U.S. Navy warfare device awarded solely by a U.S. Marine Corps general officer. This awarding authority cannot be delegated to U.S. Navy officers. However, obtaining the title of "FMF" is a rigorous procedure and not every hospital corpsman who has been with a Marine Corps unit will wear the FMF warfare device. U.S. Navy officers in the medical community (Medical Corps (doctor), Nurse Corps, Dental Corps, Medical Service Corps) can earn and wear the officer equivalent to this insignia. Additionally any sailor attached to a USMC unit can earn and wear an FMF warfare device. (e.g., Religious Program specialists, or administrative rates such as logistic specialists) provided they complete all the qualifications for the FMF warfare specialist.

== Independent duty corpsman ==
The first physician assistants were selected from Navy corpsmen who had combat experience in South Vietnam. They made up members of the first PA class at Duke University. The Navy trained its own physician assistants drawing from the ranks of qualified petty officer second class corpsman, as well as independent duty hospital corpsmen at the Naval School of Health Sciences in Portsmouth, Virginia until 1985, then at San Diego, California and current the Interservice Physician Assistant Program (IPAP) with a university affiliation of the University of Nebraska Medical Center (UNMC). It is conducted in two phases the first phase at the Graduate School and Academy of Health Sciences at AMEDDC&S, Fort Sam Houston, Texas and the second phase at various medical facilities and specialties. When training completed they become officers in the Medical Service Corps (MSC). Former Navy hospital corpsmen are also represented in many medical disciplines, as physicians, nurses, medical administrators and other walks of life. After completing their training, a physician assistant is promoted to the rank of lieutenant junior grade (O-2). Previously after graduating from civilian PA school, they had only been given the rank of warrant officer 2 (CWO2).

== Rate/rating structure ==
- HR: Hospitalman recruit (E-1)
- HA: Hospitalman apprentice (E-2)
- HN: Hospitalman (E-3) (see USN apprenticeships)
- HM3: Hospital corpsman third class (E-4)
- HM2: Hospital corpsman second class (E-5)
- HM1: Hospital corpsman first class (E-6)
- HMC: Chief hospital corpsman (E-7)
- HMCS: Senior chief hospital corpsman (E-8)
- HMCM: Master chief hospital corpsman (E-9)

== Badges ==
Effective 2 April 1948 the Navy changed the names and insignia of the hospital corps. The new titles were Hospitalman Recruit, Hospitalman Apprentice, Hospitalman, Hospital Corpsman Third, Second, and First Class, and Chief Hospital Corpsman. The red Geneva cross, which had marked corpsmen for 50 years, was replaced in the rating badge with the misattributed mark of the winged caduceus. The rates of Senior Chief and Master Chief Hospital Corpsman were added in 1958.

See: List of United States Navy ratings § Administration, deck, technical, and weapons specialty ratings

== Ships named in honor of hospital corpsmen ==
Reference: Dictionary of American Naval Fighting Ships

- USS Benfold (DDG-65)
- USS Caron (DD-970)
- USS De Wert (FFG-45)
- USS Durant (DER-389) *Also sailed as USCGC Durant (WDE-489)
- USS Frament (APD-77)
- USS Halyburton (FFG-40)
- USS Francis Hammond (FF-1067)
- USS Jobb (DE-707)
- USS Daniel A. Joy (DE-585)
- USS Lester (DE-1022)
- USS Liddle (DE-206)
- USS Litchfield (AG-95)
- USS Thaddeus Parker (DE-369)
- USS David R. Ray (DD-971)
- USS Henry W. Tucker (DD-875)
- USS Valdez (FF-1096)
- USS Walter C. Wann (DE-412)
- USS Jack Williams (FFG-24)
- USS John Willis (DE-1027)
- USS Don O. Woods (APD-118)
- USS William Charette (DDG-130)
- USS John E. Kilmer (DDG-134)
- USS Robert R. Ingram (DDG-149)

== U.S. Navy enlisted medical personnel killed in action ==
- American Civil War (1861–1865), 6
- Spanish–American War (1898), 3
- World War I (1917–1918), 20
- Nicaragua (1932), 1
- World War II (1941–1945), 1,170
- Korean War (1950–1953), 109
- Dominican Republic (1965), 1
- Vietnam War (1962–1975), 639
- Beirut, (1983), 15
- Persian Gulf War (1990–1991), 0
- Afghanistan (2001–2021), 14
- Iraq War (2003–2010), 29
- Total in all conflicts: 2,013

== Decorations of valor awarded to hospital corpsmen ==
- Medal of Honor, 22
- Navy Cross, 179
- Distinguished Service Cross (United States Army), 31
- Silver Star Medal, 959
- Bronze Star Medal with Combat "V" for heroism, 1,600

=== Medal of Honor recipients ===
Pre-World War I

- Hospital Apprentice Robert H. Stanley, USN (Boxer Rebellion)
- Hospital Apprentice First Class William Zuiderveld, USN (Veracruz Incursion)
- Hospital Apprentice Fred H. McGuire, USN (Philippine Insurrection)
- Hospital Steward William S. Shacklette, USN (Boiler Explosion in San Diego)

World War I

- Pharmacist's Mate First Class John H. Balch, USN
- Hospital Apprentice First Class David E. Hayden, USN

World War II

- Hospital Apprentice First Class Robert Eugene Bush, USN
- Pharmacist's Mate Second Class William D. Halyburton Jr., USNR
- Hospital Apprentice First Class Fred F. Lester, USN
- Pharmacist's Mate First Class Francis J. Pierce, USN
- Pharmacist's Mate Second Class George E. Wahlen, USN
- Pharmacist's Mate Third Class Jack Williams, USN
- Pharmacist's Mate First Class John H. Willis, USN

Korean War

- Hospital Corpsman Third Class Edward C. Benfold, USN
- Hospital Corpsman Third Class William R. Charette, USN
- Hospitalman Richard D. Dewert, USN
- Hospitalman Francis C. Hammond, USN
- Hospitalman John E. Kilmer, USN

Vietnam War

- Hospital Corpsman Second Class Donald E. Ballard, USN
- Hospital Corpsman Third Class Wayne M. Caron, USN
- Hospital Corpsman Third Class Robert R. Ingram, USN
- Hospital Corpsman Second Class David R. Ray, USN

== United States Maritime Service hospital corpsmen ==
During World War II, the United States Maritime Service created a Hospital Corps similar to the U.S. Navy's and sent pursers through this hospital corpsman training, to serve in a combined administrative and medical role on civilian tankers, freighters, and oilers. Prior to this, there were no competent trained personnel to perform first aid aboard these vessels. The purser-corpsman was trained in anatomy, physiology, pharmacy, clinical laboratory, hygiene and sanitation, emergency treatment, first aid, and nursing. They were taught how to administer injections, treat compound fractures, administer blood plasma, and suture wounds.

The Maritime Service's Hospital Corps School was founded at the Sheepshead Bay Maritime Service Training Station on 7 December 1942. Surgeon S.S. Heilwell (R), United States Uniformed Public Health Service, was placed in charge of training. The course was taught over four months, with a 12-week period of didactic classroom experience and four weeks of practical experience at a Naval hospital. The original class of 331 students resulted in 239 graduates on 12 March 1943, but demand saw an increase in the class to 600 students, to cycle in 50 student classes starting on a weekly basis. Training stations were instructed to provide careful scrutiny by examining boards for all candidates. Pursers on sea duty started arriving at the station on 10 August 1943. By 1 January 1944, there were 600 purser-corpsmen at sea, with 1,324 graduates in the Maritime Service. Selection required an above average mark on the General Classification Test and interest in both administration and health care.

== Other notable corpsmen ==
- Bill Cosby served as a hospital corpsman from 1956 to 1960, spending part of his career at Bethesda Naval Hospital where he treated those wounded in action in Korea
- Hugh Sullivan served as a hospital corpsman during the Vietnam War, as chronicled in his memoir: "Doc! The Adventures of a Navy Hospital Corpsman"
- John Bradley (United States Navy) fought in the battle of Iwo Jima as part of 28th Marine Regiment where he would be featured in Lou Lowery's photograph of the first U.S. flag on Mount Suribachi afterwards he played the part of himself in the 1949 John Wayne Film: Sands Of Iwo Jima.
- Luis Fonseca was awarded the Navy Cross for extraordinary heroism for his actions during the Battle of Nasiriyah in the Iraq War.
- Marcus Gill was the main perpetrator of the 1995 Okinawa rape incident, after having served as a corpsman.

== See also ==
- 68W (U.S. Army Combat Medic MOS code)
- Ambulance § Military use
- Battlefield medicine
- Combat medic
- Combat Medical Technician (British Army)
- Enlisted Medics (U.S. Air Force)
- Fleet Marine Force
- Fleet Marine Force insignia
- Flight medic
- Medical assistant
- Medical Assistant (Royal Navy)
- Military medicine
- Medical Corps (United States Navy)
- Nurse Corps (United States Navy)
- Navy Medical Service Corps
- Dental Corps (United States Navy)
- Special Amphibious Reconnaissance Corpsman
- Special Warfare Combatant-craft Crewmen (SWCC)
- Pharmacist's Mate First Class Wheeler Bryson Lipes
