= Religious program specialist =

United States Navy rating

Religious Program Specialist
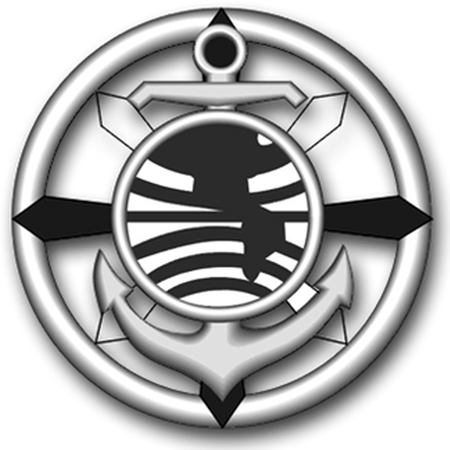
- Rating insignia
- Issued by: United States Navy
- Type: Enlisted rating
- Abbreviation: RP
- Specialty: Administration

Religious program specialist (RP) is a United States Navy rating. Religious program specialists assist naval chaplains in their duties as well as provide support to naval chaplains in developing programs to meet the needs of U.S. Navy sailors, U.S. Marines, and their families. They also act as armed bodyguards for the chaplains (who are largely unarmed). RPs perform functions that do not require ordination and do no pastoral counseling; adherence to a religion is not a requirement or prerequisite to become an RP and some RPs are even atheists.

== Overview ==
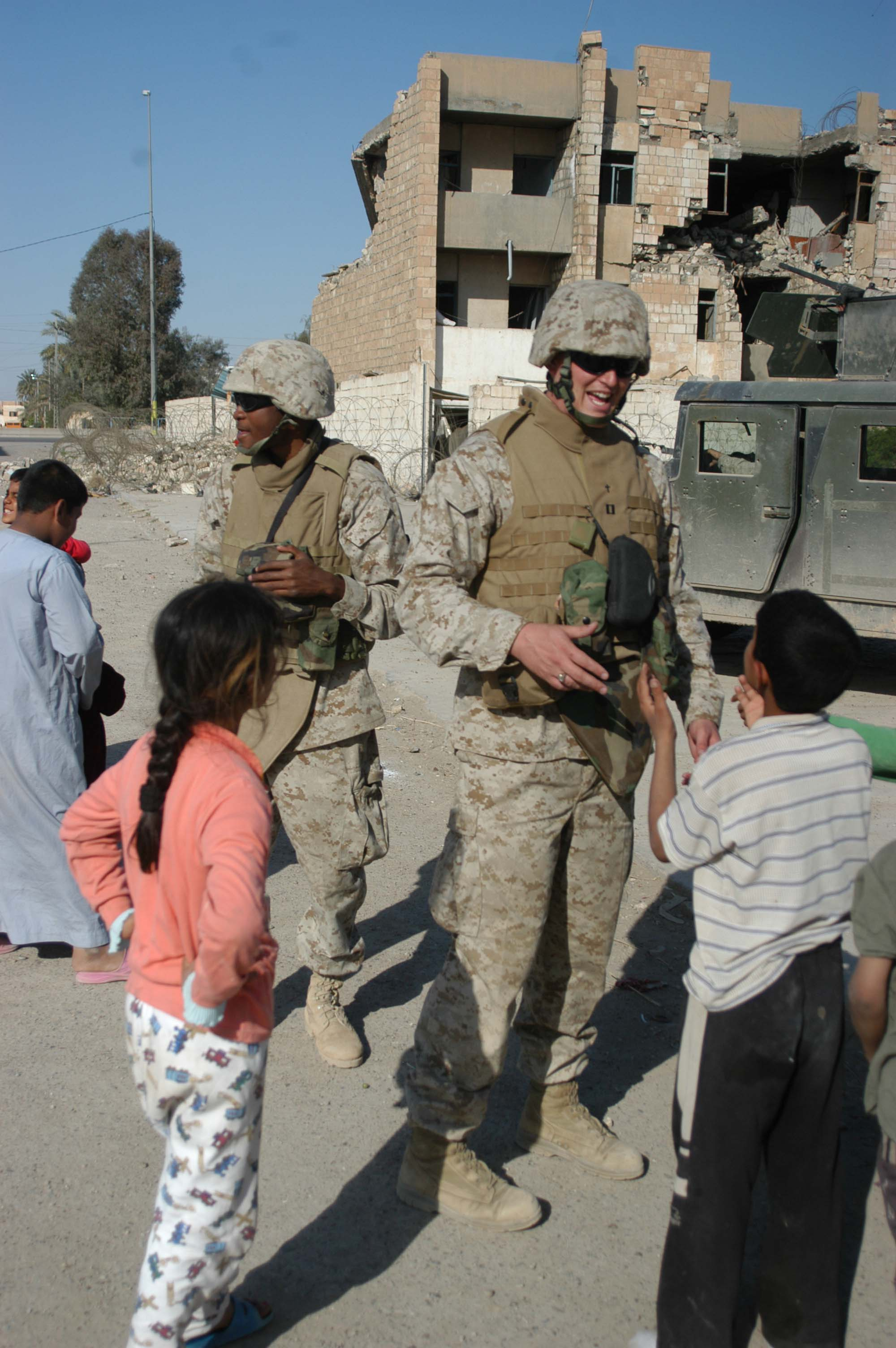
A religious program specialist (left) during the Iraq War in 2005, armed with a rifle. The RP keeps his eyes peeled for threats while escorting the Navy chaplain. As the Geneva Conventions prohibit chaplains from carrying a firearm, armed religious program specialists act as their de facto bodyguards in the field.

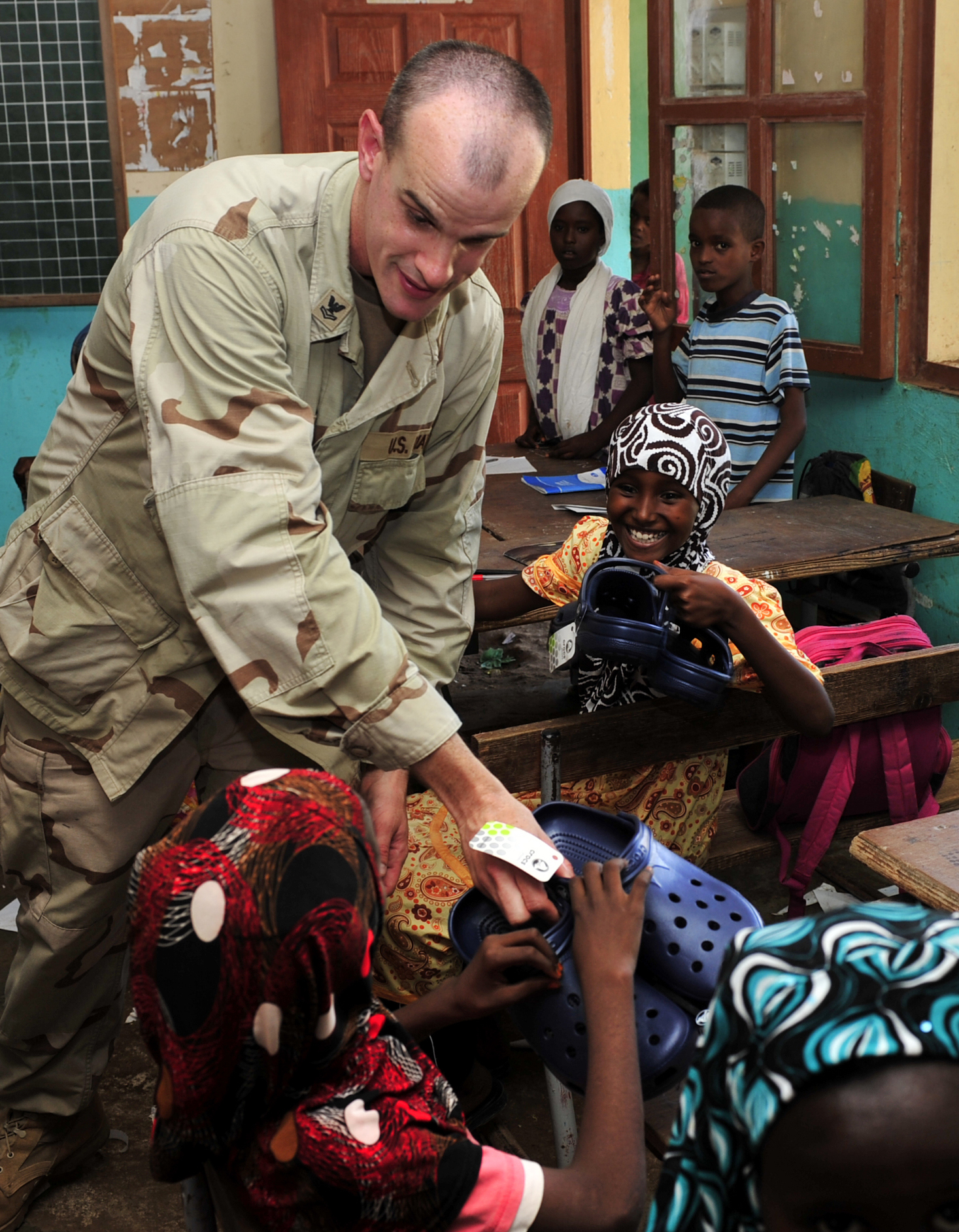
A RP, hands out shoes to students at a school in Djibouti. The World Emergency Relief donated 10,000 pairs. The Camp Lemonnier base chapel, were distributing the shoes to local schools, refugee camps, and churches. As well as sending them with Army Civil Affairs detachments to distribute in other African countries.

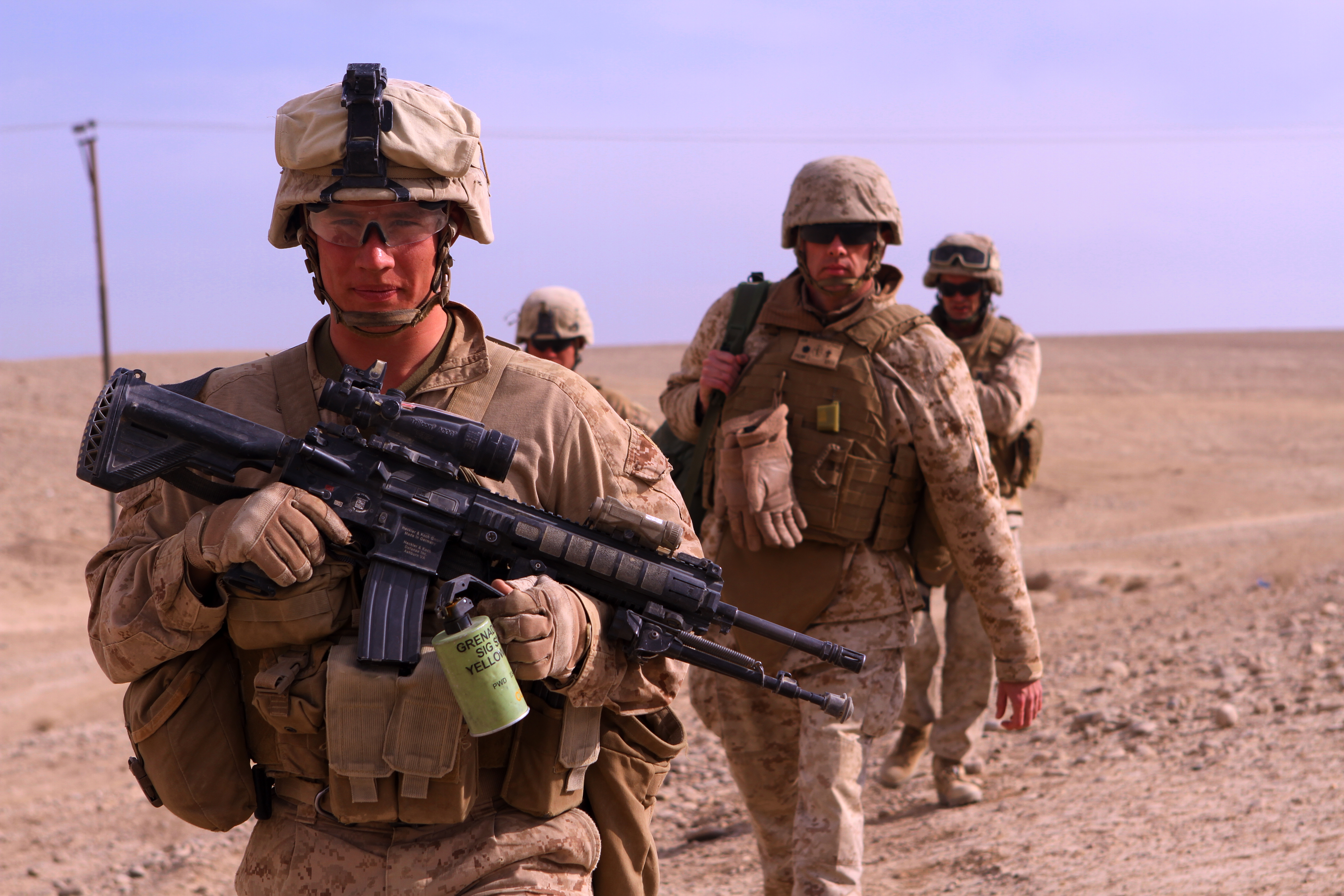
A religious program specialist during the Iraq War. When serving in the Fleet Marine Force (FMF), religious program specialists wear the U.S. Marine Corps Combat Utility Uniform (MCCUU) identical to the uniforms worn by their Marine Corps counterparts with the exception of "U.S. Navy" tape and US Navy rank insignias.

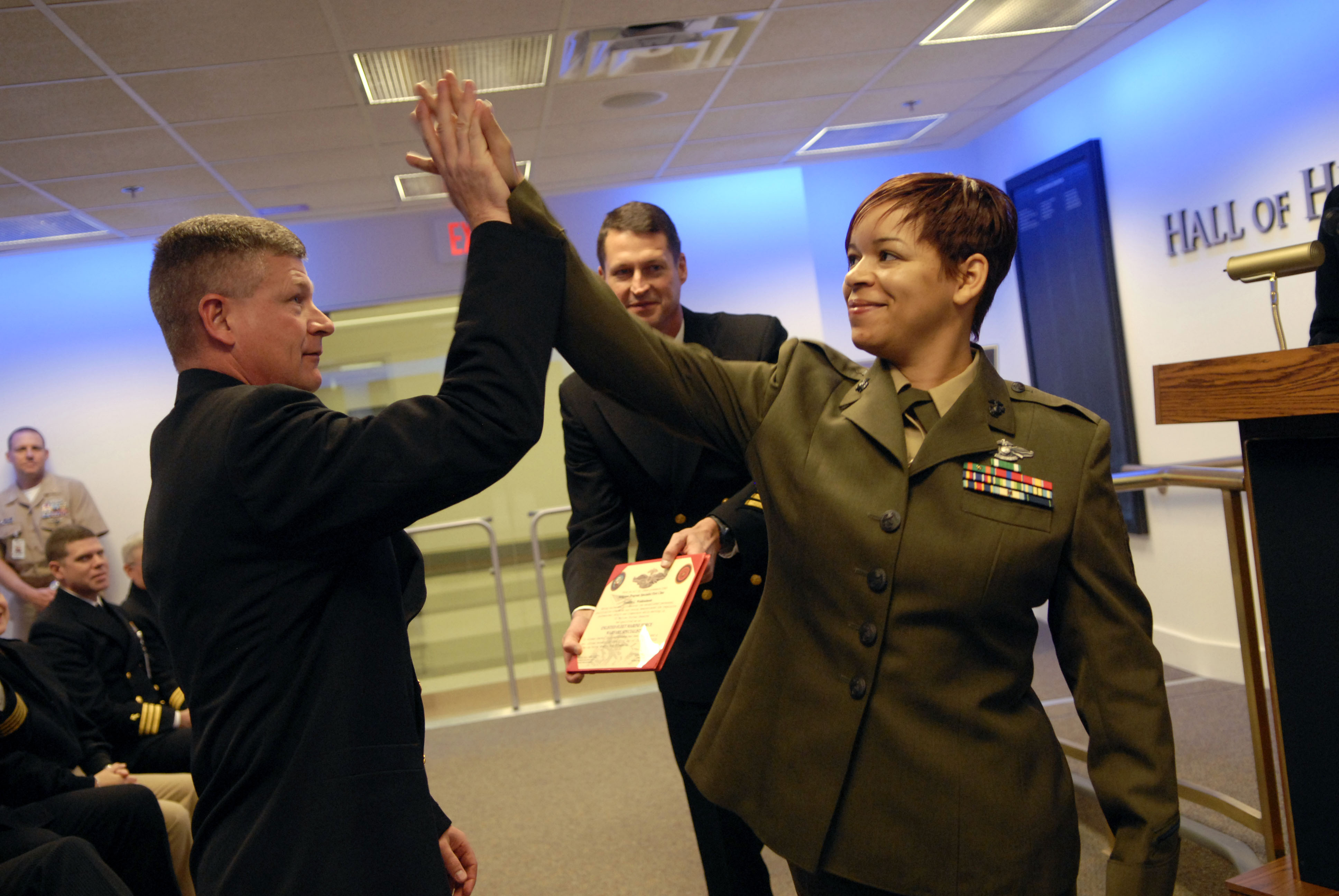
A religious program specialist and the MCPON in 2009.

The duties performed by RPs include: supporting chaplains of all faiths and religious activities of the command, maintaining records, accounting, ecclesiastical documents and references of various faith groups, maintaining liaison with religious and community agencies, assisting in preparation of devotional and religious educational materials, and audio-visual displays, determining, developing, managing and maintaining the administrative and logistical support requirements of religious programs and facilities aboard ships, shore stations, hospitals, Marine Corps units and other sea service commands. operating and maintaining libraries aboard ships and isolated duty stations, performing bookkeeping and accounting functions related to Religious Offerings Fund and OPTAR fund transactions, as custodians, rigging and unrigging for religious activities, publicizing the command's religious activities, training command religious program volunteers on logistics and instruction methods, supervising chaplain's office personnel, performing administrative, clerical and secretarial duties, stocking and maintaining field mount-out boxes.

They are also responsible for providing physical security for chaplains during field exercises and in combat environments, Civil affairs support.

RPs often serve, with Fleet Marine Force units, with Naval Expeditionary Combat Command which include Seabees. They also can serve with Navy SEALs, SWCC, Navy EOD, and Dive units. They can be stationed on Shore Stations, at Naval Hospitals, at CREDO retreat centers, on Individual Augmentee assignments with Chaplains from other services. RP's also have the opportunity to serve on ships as well.

RPs must have a favorable interview by chaplain/RP screening committee. High school diploma graduate or equivalent with successful completion of 10th grade. Repeat military offenders and personnel convicted by military or civilian authorities of any criminal offense reflecting unfavorably upon their character or integrity are ineligible for the RP rating. Moral turpitude offense(s) are disqualifying. Ministers, Priests, or Rabbis are not eligible for this rating.

=== "A" School ===
In August 2009, the Naval Chaplaincy School and Center (NCSC) was opened in Fort Jackson, Columbia, South Carolina. The RP “A” School was then moved back to its original location Meridian, Mississippi at NCSC so that RPs and Chaplains would be able to train with each other. The move to an Army base was intended to make for a more seamless integration of the field training Chaplains and RPs can expect when assigned with Marines and Army units.

=== "C" School ===
After “A” school RP's are sent to Camp Johnson for 8 weeks where they will receive Marine Combat Skills and basic field medical training. Training for the Fleet Marine Force (FMF) familiarizes Navy RP's with the Marines. A bond and mutual respect is often formed between Marines and their assigned religious program specialist, earning respect apart from their Navy shipmates. FMF Religious Program Specialist are issued the Marine Corps service uniforms and camouflage uniforms (MARPAT) while assigned to the Marine Corps.

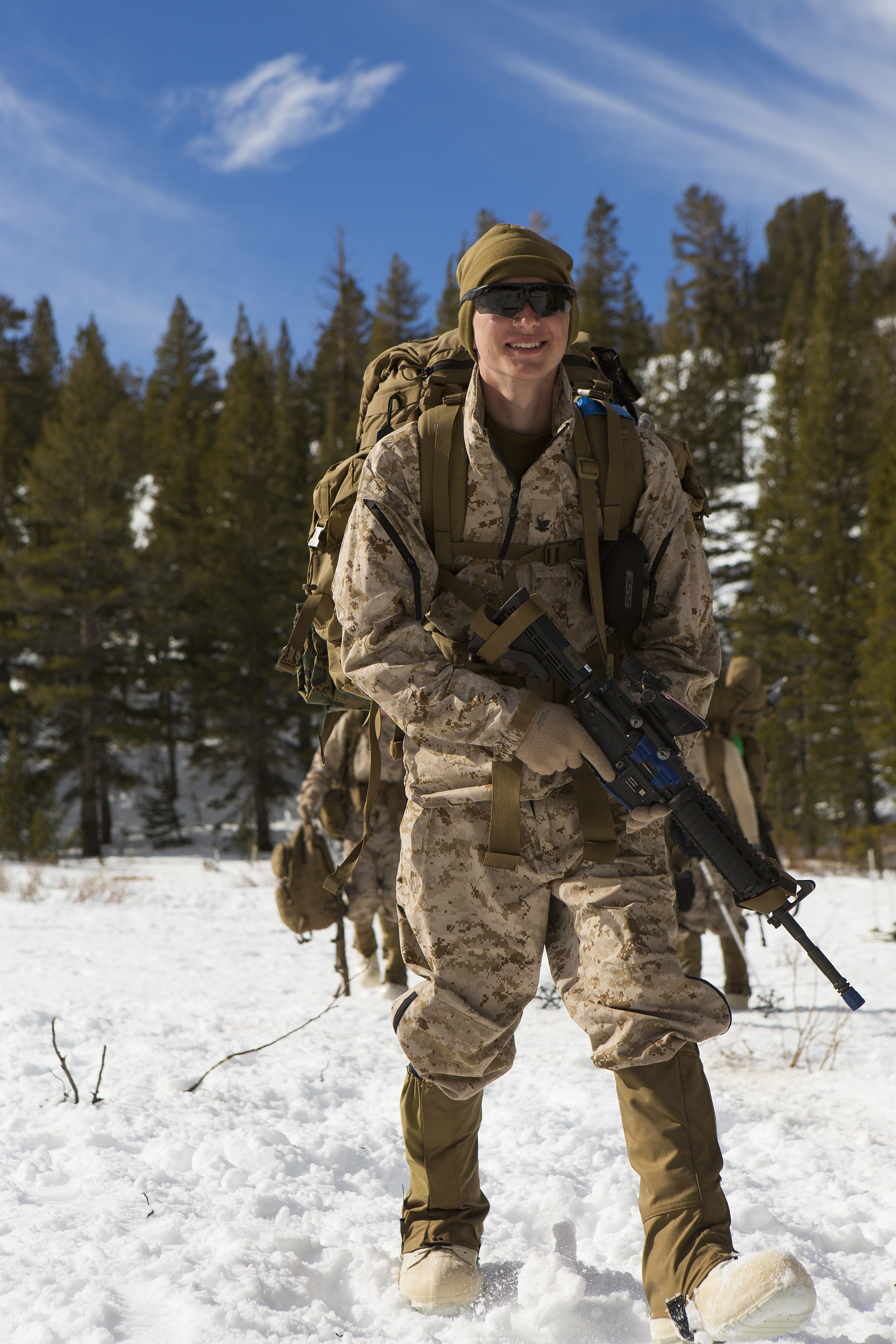
RP's have the opportunity to go to certain combat schools of Marines. This religious program specialist is with Combat Logistics Battalion 26, 2nd Marine Logistics Group, and begins his cold weather training movement at the U.S. Mountain Warfare Training Center

== History ==
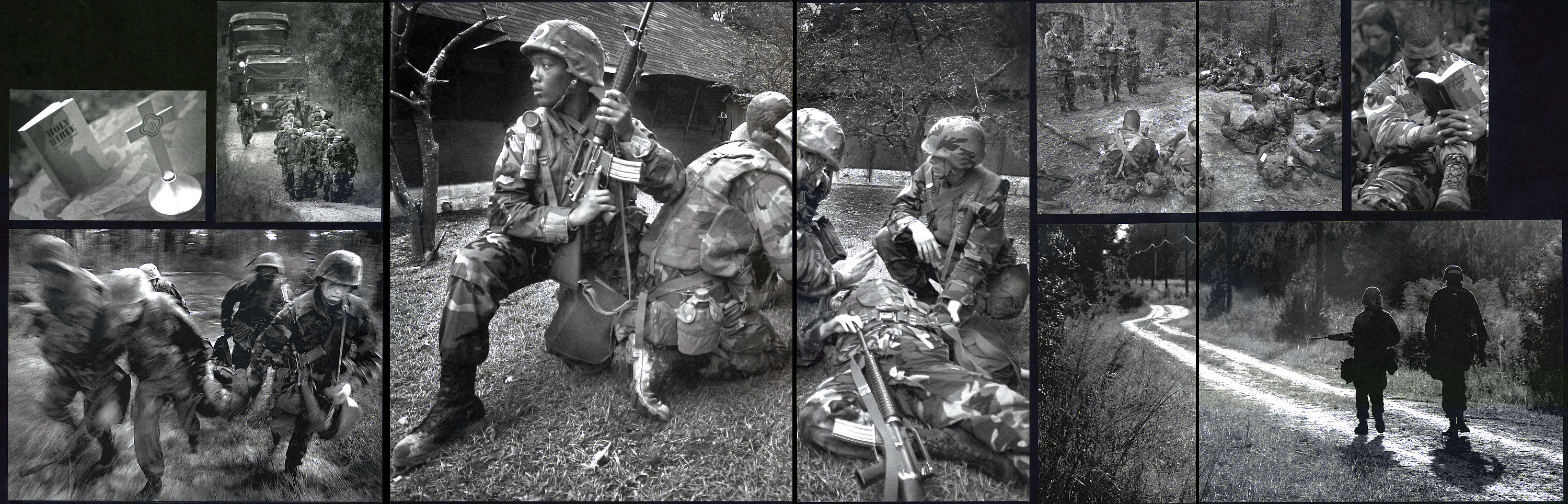
Religious Program Specialist throughout history

The idea of having a chaplain's specialist assigned to each ship with a chaplain aboard dates from 1878. That year a committee of chaplains first made the recommendation to the Navy Department. Although the Navy Department did not immediately adopt the recommendation, successive generations of chaplains gave their support to the idea. (belsielat gerunda 2019)

=== Specialist "W" ===
Finally, from 1942 to 1945, the Navy adopted the Specialist “W” rating (the “W” stood for Welfare) to address the specific wartime needs of Chaplains serving in World War II. Specialist "W"s were at that time required to: Perform clerical duties; play piano and organ for worship services; be competent musical directors; not expected to serve as religious leaders (just as it is today for RPs); and be willing to serve anywhere under any conditions.

=== WAVES ===
Women also distinguished themselves as Specialists (W) during the war. Thirty-eight “WAVES” were selected to serve in the rating. Virginia T. Moore was the first woman to be selected as a Specialist (W) and was subsequently assigned duty in November 1943 in the Nation's Capital. The first “WAVES” to attend the Chaplains School in June 1944 were recognized as highly motivated, dedicated, and conscientious students.

=== W. Everett Hendricks ===
The first officially designated Specialist (W) in the history of the Navy was W. Everett Hendricks who was authorized to enlist on 23 April 1942 with the rating of Specialist (W) first class. Hendricks was assigned duty in the Office of the Chaplain at the Naval Training Station, Great Lakes, Illinois. He was recognized as a talented musician and choir director and contributed significantly to the success of the famed Great Lakes’ Bluejacket Choir.

=== Chief Specialist "W" Alfred R. Markin ===
Between April 1942 and August 1945, the Bureau of Naval Personnel selected 509 individuals for the Specialist (W) rating out of 1,455 applicants. Alfred R. Markin was advanced to Chief Specialist (W) in February 1944 and is recognized as being the first individual to be advanced to chief petty officer in this rating. A total of 30 Specialists (W) were advanced to chief petty officer, and most of these senior petty officers were assigned to large training centers and in the offices of district, force, and fleet chaplains.

=== Chaplains Assistant (SSN534) ===
Also in 1942, the Marine Corps established a rating known as Chaplain's Assistant (SSN534). The first Marine to receive the new classification was Gilbert Dean Arnold, who was made a Gunnery Sergeant, the equivalent of a Chief Petty Officer in the Navy. Thirty-five members of the Marine Corps Women's Reserve became Chaplain's Assistants in addition to the 105 active duty Marines. Unlike the Navy and Coast Guard who instituted the Specialist (W) as a wartime measure, the Marine Corps announced that it intended to retain its rating of Chaplain's Assistant after the war.

=== Personnelmen and Yeoman Chaplain's Professional Assistant (YN-2525) ===
In April 1948, the Navy established the Personnelman rating. Included in the job classification for this rating was Chaplain's Assistant. From 1945 to 1979, the Yeoman rating furnished personnel in the Chaplain's Clerk specialty (YN 2525) to aide and support Navy chaplains in their efforts to provide quality ministry.

Before a Yeoman could be assigned to a chaplain, however, the command chaplain had to go through the lengthy and time-consuming process of justifying the need for a YN 2525 billet. As a result, the establishment of a permanent rating to support the Navy's chaplains remained a primary goal of the Chief of Chaplains.

=== 15 January 1979 ===
The 101-year quest for a permanent chaplain's assistant rating was finally realized on 15 January 1979 when the Secretary of the Navy approved the establishment of the Religious Program Specialist (RP) rating. Stringent selection requirements were set, and personnel requesting lateral conversions from other ratings to the RP rating had to be interviewed and recommended by a Navy chaplain.

=== Requirements to cross-rate to RP in 1979 ===
- Chaplain's Endorsement
- Commanding Officer's Recommendation
- High School Graduates or GED
- Eligible for Security Clearance
- Demonstrate support for Navy's Equal Opportunity Program
- Have no speech impediments
- Demonstrate the ability to write effectively
- No convictions in military or civilian court in last 3 years
- Be willing to serve ALL faith backgrounds
- Be willing to serve as a combatant with the USMC

=== Merger threatens rating ===
Between 2002 and 2004, a manpower proposal was put together that would merge the RP rating– along with CTA and LN – back into the Yeoman rating as a “right-sizing” and cost-cutting measure. Long-rumored to be on the verge of ending the rating, it was the RPs role with the Marine Corps and the Corps’ emphatic support of what RPs do that eventually spared the rating from this merger.

=== Still making news ===
==== January 23, 2004 ====
Religious Program Specialist 1st Class (FMF) Robert Page was awarded a Bronze Star with the Combat Distinguishing Device "V" for Valor, indicating direct combat involvement, for his actions near An Nasariya, Iraq, in March while supporting Operations Enduring and Iraqi Freedom.

== Badges ==
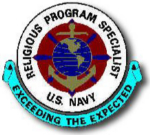
USN Religious Program Specialist (RP) emblem, from Camp Pendleton Marine Corps Hospital website

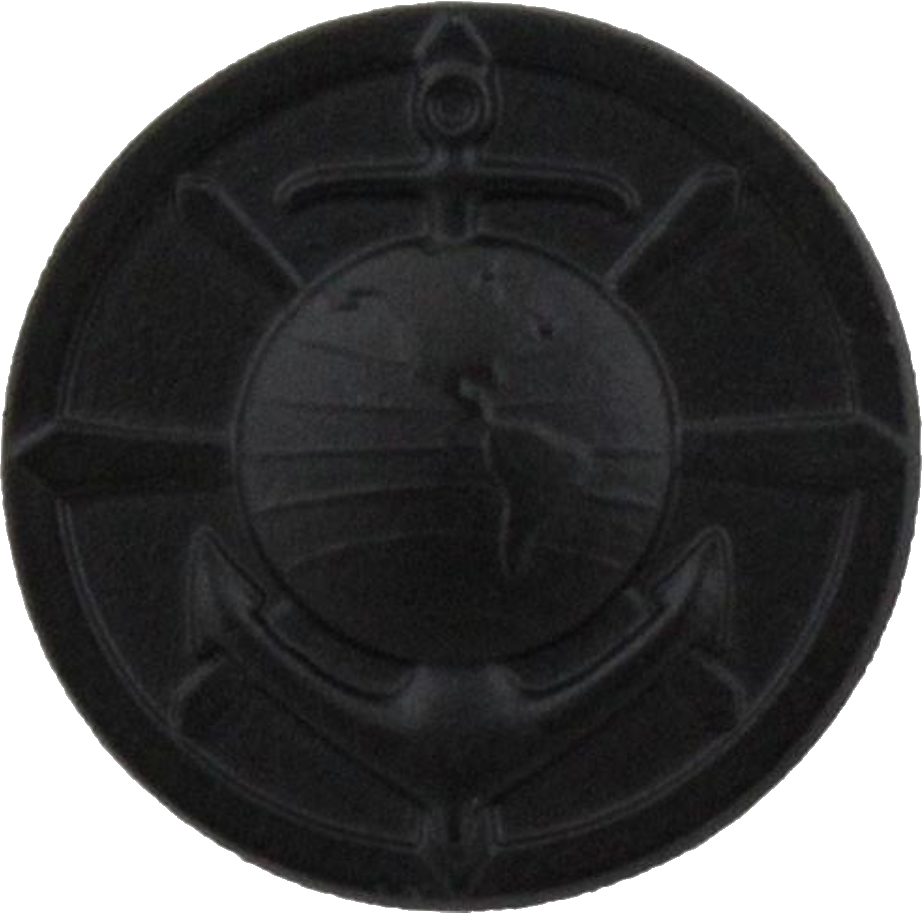
The small metal badge, introduced in 1989, worn by religious program specialists on the left collar of their camouflage uniforms in a war zone.

=== The Compass, Globe and Anchor ===
- The compass suggests the direction which religion gives to life.
- The globe symbolizes the fact that religious ministries are available throughout the world.
- The anchor indicates that religious support is provided continually for personnel of the sea services.

== See also ==
- United States military chaplains
- Chaplain assistants (Army)
