= Awards and decorations of the United States Department of the Navy =

US Naval Awards and decorations

The Awards and decorations of the United States Department of the Navy are the military awards and decorations which are presented to members of the United States Navy and United States Marine Corps under the authority of the Secretary of the Navy.

Other military service members may also receive specific Navy Department military awards, provided such service members are performing duty under a Navy or Marine Corps command. Likewise, a Navy or Marine Corps service member may receive medals and decorations of another military branch, if cross assigned to a command of the respective service. All Navy and Marine Corps members are eligible to receive inter-service awards and decorations as well as approved foreign awards and International awards.

== Department of the Navy awards ==
=== Navy and Marine Corps decorations ===
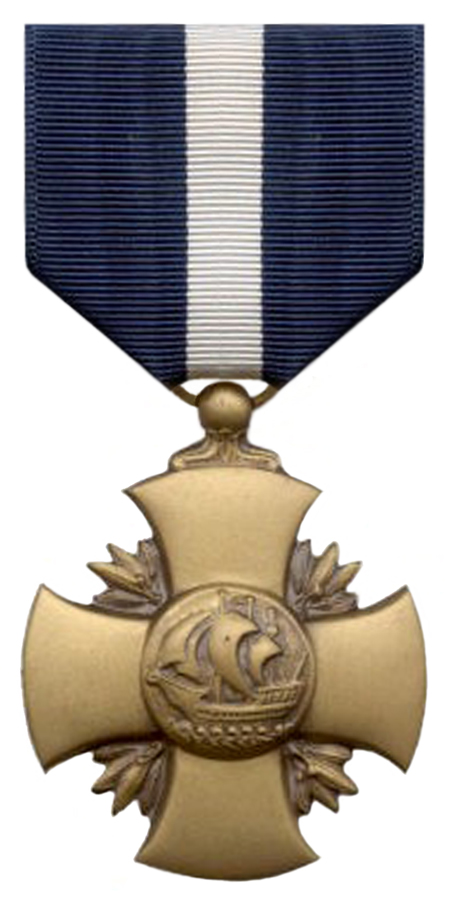
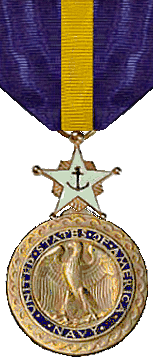
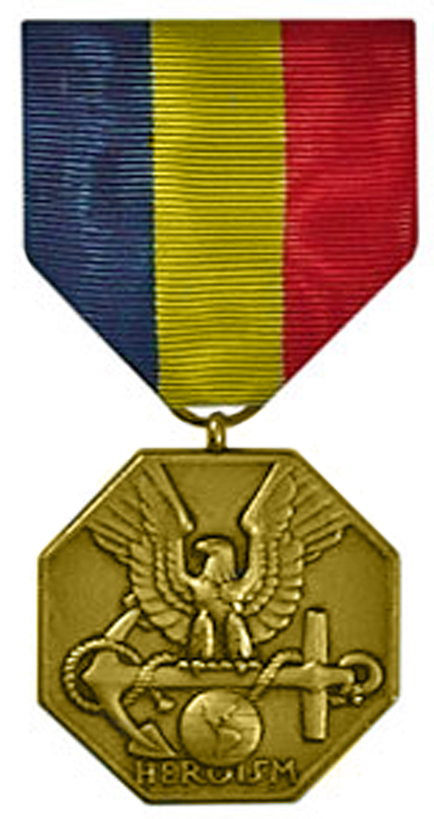
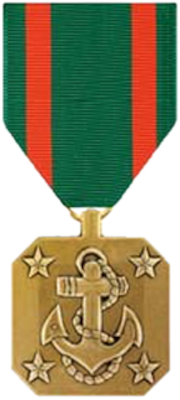
Navy Cross	Navy Distinguished Service Medal	Navy and Marine Corps Medal	Navy and Marine Corps Commendation Medal	Navy and Marine Corps Achievement Medal
				Navy and Marine Corps Achievement Medal

=== Expeditionary Medals ===
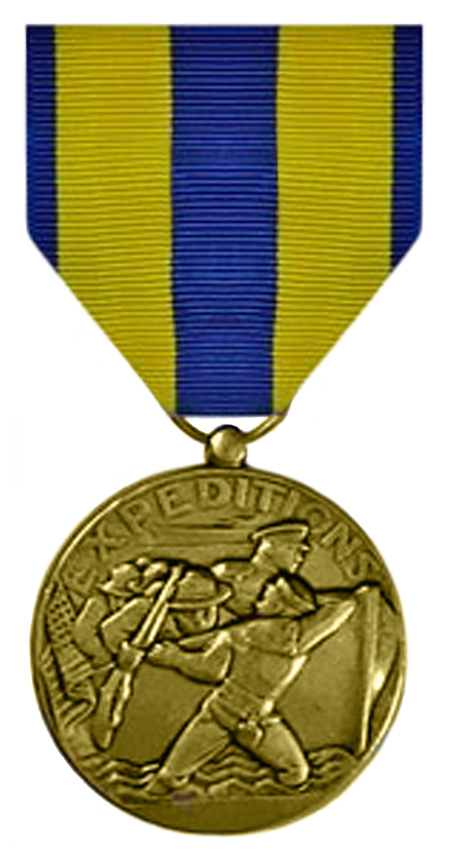
Navy Expeditionary Medal*

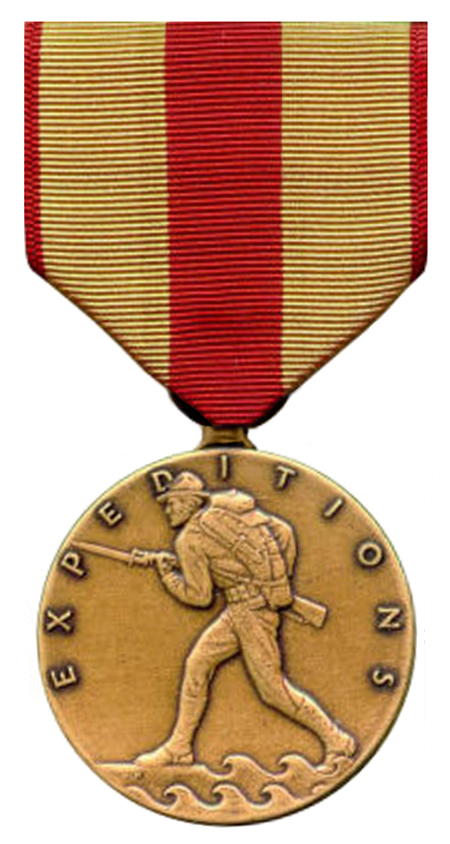
Marine Corps Expeditionary Medal**

=== Good Conduct and Reserve Medal ===
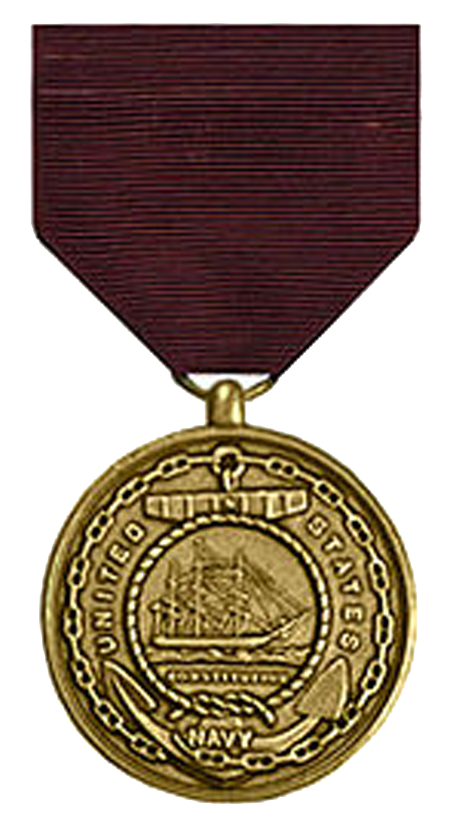
Navy Good Conduct Medal*

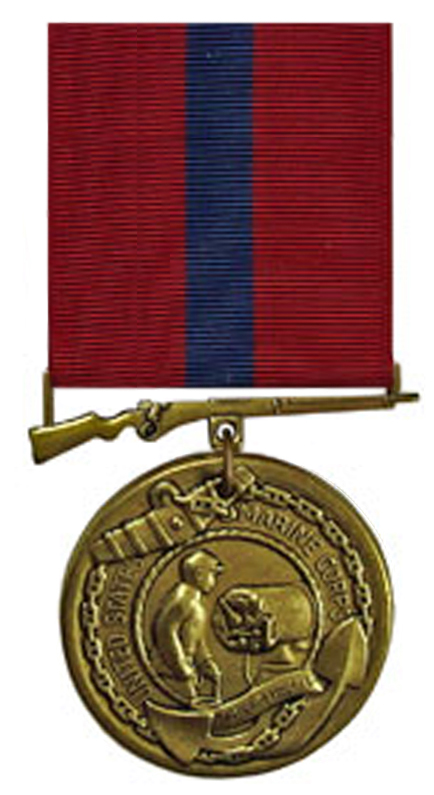
Marine Corps Good Conduct Medal**

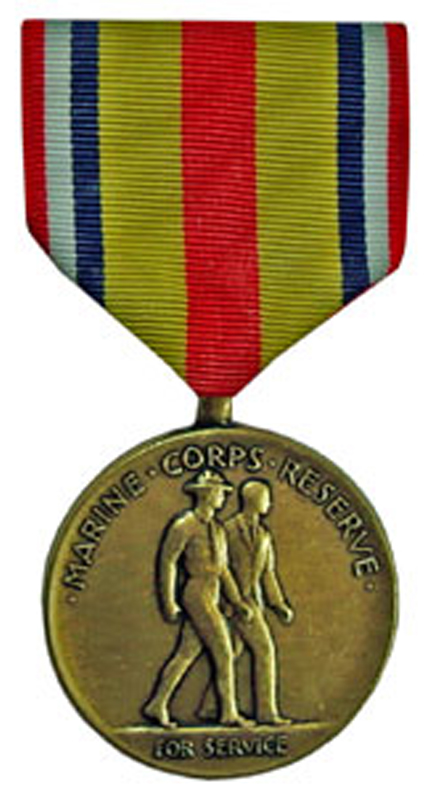
Selected Marine Corps Reserve Medal**

=== Navy and Marine Corps unit awards ===
Navy Presidential Unit Citation

Navy Unit Commendation

Navy Meritorious Unit Commendation

Navy "E" Ribbon

=== Navy and Marine Corps ribbon only awards ===
Combat Action Ribbon	Sea Service Deployment Ribbon	Navy Arctic Service Ribbon	Naval Reserve Sea Service Ribbon*
Navy and Marine Corps Overseas Service Ribbon	Navy Recruiting Service Ribbon*	Marine Corps Recruiting Ribbon**	Navy Accession Training Service Ribbon*
Marine Corps Drill Instructor Ribbon**	Marine Corps Security Guard Ribbon**	Marine Corps Combat Instructor Ribbon**	Navy Ceremonial Duty Ribbon*
Navy Recruit Honor Graduate Ribbon*

Department of the Navy Civilian Awards
Distinguished Civilian Service Award	Superior Civilian Service Award	Meritorious Civilian Service Award	Civilian Service Commendation Medal	Civilian Service Achievement Medal	Distinguished Civilian Medal for Valor / Superior Civilian Medal for Valor
Angela M. Houtz Medal for Fallen Civilians	Captain Robert Dexter Conrad Award for Scientific Achievement	Distinguished Achievement in Science Award	Distinguished Public Service Award	Superior Public Service Award	Meritorious Public Service Award

=== Marksmanship awards ===
==== U.S. Navy ====
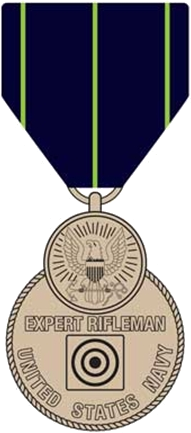
Navy Expert Rifleman Medal

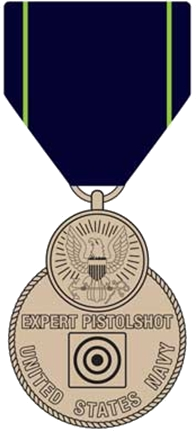
Navy Expert Pistol Shot Medal

Navy Rifle Sharpshooter Ribbon

Navy Pistol Sharpshooter Ribbon

Navy Rifle Marksmanship Ribbon

Navy Pistol Marksmanship Ribbon

Navy Authorized Marksmanship Competition Awards/Badges

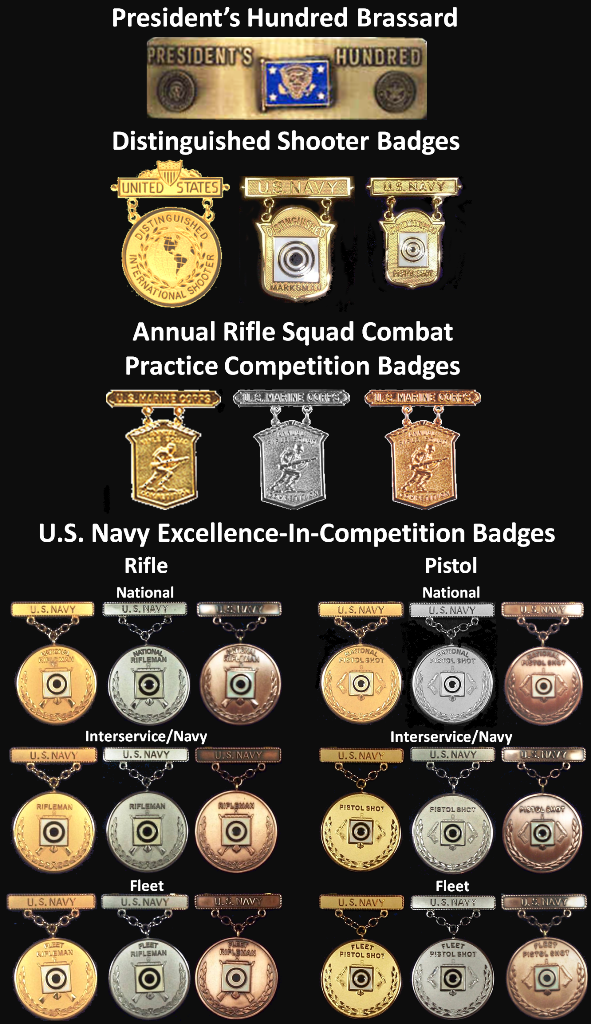

==== U.S. Marine Corps ====
Marine Corps Authorized Marksmanship Competition Awards/Badges

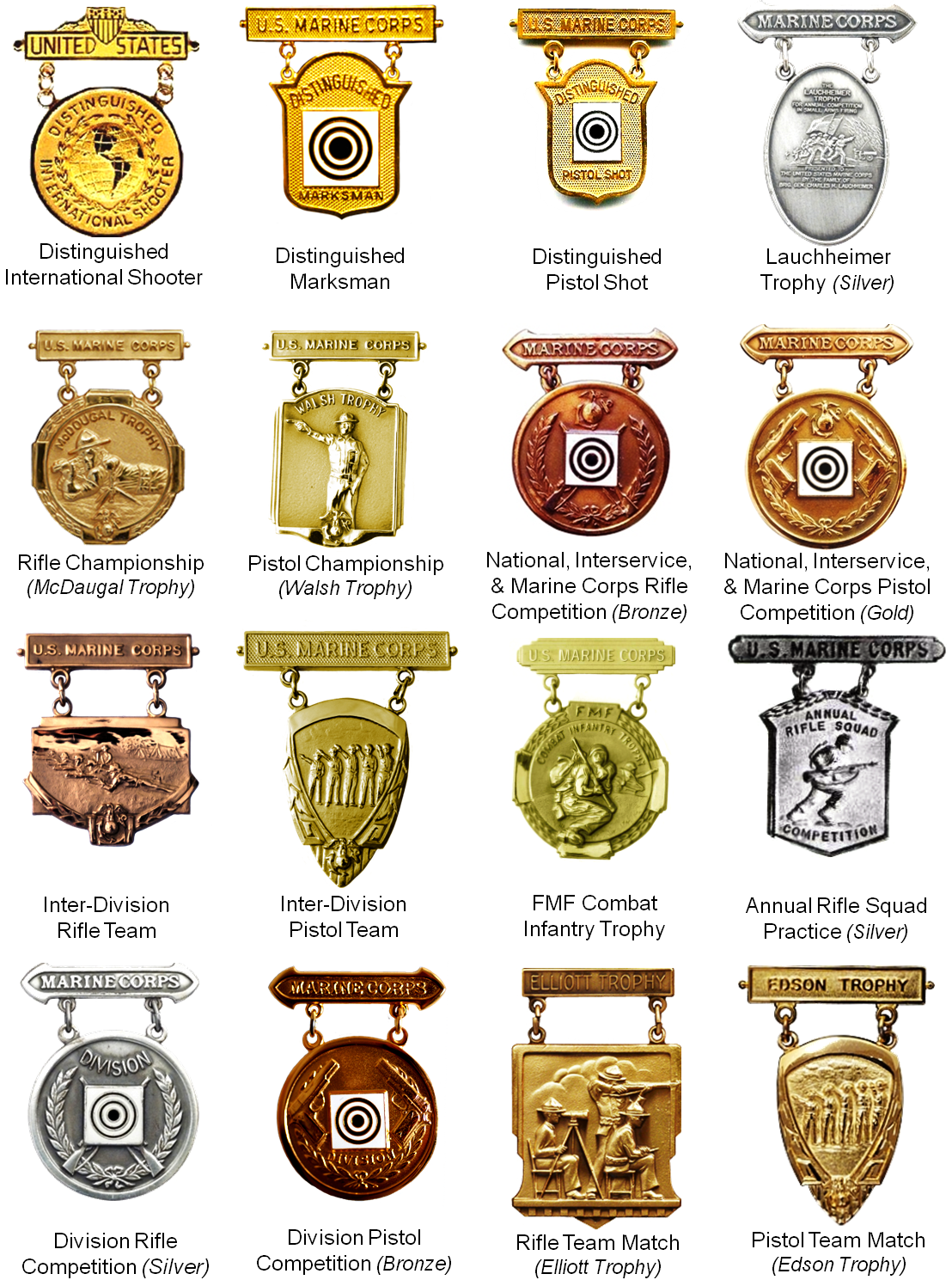

The Lauchheimer Trophy Badge, National/Interservice/Marine Corps Rifle/Pistol Competition Badges, Annual Rifle Squad Practice Badge, and Division Rifle/Pistol Competition Badges are awarded in gold, silver, and bronze.

== Notes ==
- * = Awarded only to Sailors
- ** = Awarded only to Marines
- No asterisk indicates that the decoration is awarded to both services
