= Awards and decorations of the United States Armed Forces =

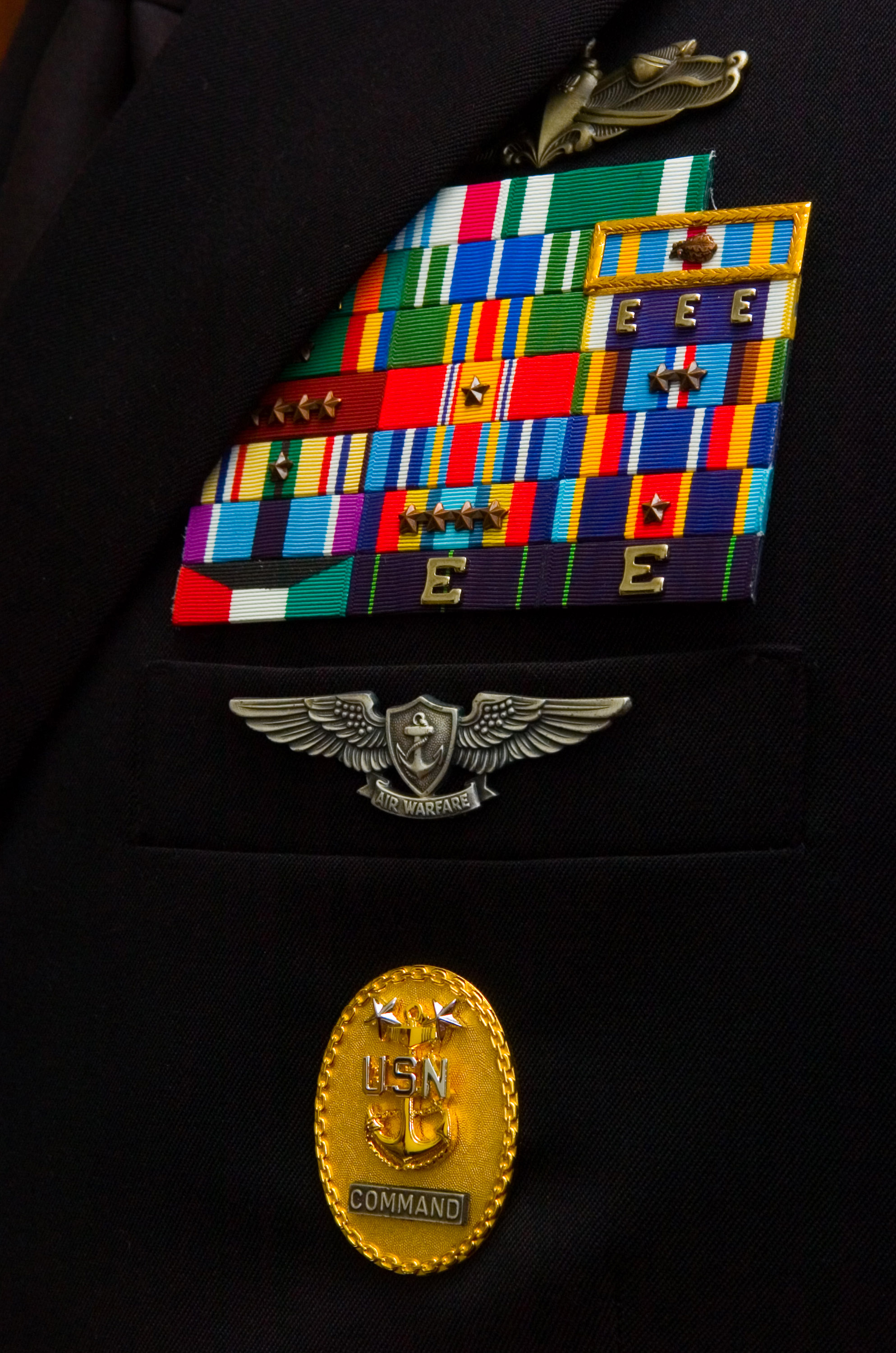
Service ribbons, ribbon devices, and badge awards displayed on a Command Master Chief Petty Officer's service uniform

Various medals, service ribbons, ribbon devices, and specific badges recognize military service and personal accomplishments of members of the U.S. Armed Forces. Such awards are a means to outwardly display the highlights of a service member's career.

== U.S. military awards currently issued to service members ==
=== General order of precedence ===
The precedence of particular awards will vary slightly among the different branches of service. All awards and decorations may be awarded to any service member unless otherwise designated by name or notation.

Ribbon/award name
Personal decorations
Awarded for "Conspicuous gallantry and intrepidity at the risk of life above and beyond the call of duty"

Medal of Honor

Service cross medals – Awarded for "extraordinary heroism in combat"

Distinguished Service Cross (Army)

Navy Cross

Air Force Cross

Coast Guard Cross

Distinguished service medals – Awarded for "exceptionally meritorious service in a duty of great responsibility"

Defense Distinguished Service Medal

Homeland Security Distinguished Service Medal

Distinguished Service Medal (Army)

Navy Distinguished Service Medal

Distinguished Service Medal (Air and Space Forces)

Coast Guard Distinguished Service Medal

Awarded for "gallantry in action"

Silver Star Medal

Awarded for "superior or exceptionally meritorious service"

Defense Superior Service Medal

Legion of Merit

Awarded for "heroism or extraordinary achievement in aerial flight"

Distinguished Flying Cross

Medals for non-combat heroism

Soldier's Medal

Navy and Marine Corps Medal

Airman's Medal

Coast Guard Medal

Awarded for heroism in combat zone or meritorious service in a war zone

Bronze Star Medal

Awarded for wounds suffered in combat^{PH}

Purple Heart

Meritorious service and aviation medals

Defense Meritorious Service Medal

Meritorious Service Medal

Air Medal

Aerial Achievement Medal (Air and Space Forces)

Commendation medals

Joint Service Commendation Medal

Army Commendation Medal

Navy and Marine Corps Commendation Medal

Air and Space Commendation Medal

Coast Guard Commendation Medal

Achievement medals

Joint Service Achievement Medal

Army Achievement Medal

Navy and Marine Corps Achievement Medal

Air and Space Achievement Medal

Coast Guard Achievement Medal

Commandant's Letter of Commendation Ribbon (Coast Guard)

Combat action awards

Navy Combat Action Ribbon

Combat Action Medal (Air and Space Forces)

Coast Guard Combat Action Ribbon

Also see: Army combat badges

Unit awards
Presidential Unit Citations

Presidential Unit Citation (Army)

Presidential Unit Citation (Navy and Marine Corps)

Presidential Unit Citation (Air and Space Forces)

Presidential Unit Citation (Coast Guard)

Joint Meritorious Unit Award

DHS Outstanding Unit Award

Valorous Unit Award (Army)

Navy Unit Commendation

Gallant Unit Citation (Air and Space Forces)

Coast Guard Unit Commendation

Meritorious Unit Commendations

Army Meritorious Unit Commendation

Navy Meritorious Unit Commendation

Meritorious Unit Award (Air and Space Forces)

Coast Guard Meritorious Unit Commendation

Coast Guard Meritorious Team Commendation

Army Superior Unit Award

Air and Space Outstanding Unit Award

Efficiency Awards

Navy "E" Ribbon

Air and Space Organizational Excellence Award

Coast Guard "E" Ribbon

Continued on right column

Ribbon/award name
Service awards (cont.)

Prisoner of War Medal

Combat Readiness Medal (Air and Space Forces)

Good conduct medals

Army Good Conduct Medal

Navy Good Conduct Medal

Air Force Good Conduct Medal

Space Force Good Conduct Medal

Marine Corps Good Conduct Medal

Coast Guard Good Conduct Medal

Reserve service medals

Army Reserve Components Achievement Medal

Air Reserve Forces Meritorious Service Medal

Selected Marine Corps Reserve Medal

Coast Guard Reserve Good Conduct Medal

Armed Forces Reserve Medal

Outstanding Airman of the Year Ribbon

Outstanding Guardian of the Year Ribbon

Coast Guard Enlisted Person of the Year Ribbon

Air and Space Recognition Ribbon

Service, expeditionary and campaign medals

Navy Expeditionary Medal

Marine Corps Expeditionary Medal

Antarctica Service Medal

Coast Guard Arctic Service Medal

Armed Forces Expeditionary Medal

Inherent Resolve Campaign Medal

Global War on Terrorism Expeditionary Medal

Global War on Terrorism Service Medal

Korea Defense Service Medal

Mexican Border Defense Medal

Armed Forces Service Medal

Humanitarian Service Medal

Military Outstanding Volunteer Service Medal

Remote Combat Effects Campaign Medal

Air and Space Campaign Medal

Nuclear Deterrence Operations Service Medal

Service and training awards

Army Sea Duty Ribbon

Navy Sea Service Deployment Ribbon

Coast Guard Sea Service Ribbon

Naval Reserve Sea Service Ribbon

Air and Space Expeditionary Service Ribbon

Navy Arctic Service Medal

Overseas service ribbons

Army Overseas Service Ribbon

Navy and Marine Corps Overseas Service Ribbon

Coast Guard Overseas Service Ribbon

Air and Space Overseas Short Tour Service Ribbon

Air and Space Overseas Long Tour Service Ribbon

Army Reserve Overseas Training Ribbon

Coast Guard Restricted Duty Ribbon

Coast Guard Special Operations Service Ribbon

Longevity ribbon

Air and Space Longevity Service Award

Recruiting service and training service ribbons

Army Recruiting Ribbon

Navy Recruiting Service Ribbon

Marine Corps Recruiting Ribbon

Coast Guard Recruiting Service Ribbon

Navy Accession Training Service Ribbon

Marine Corps Drill Instructor Ribbon

Marine Corps Combat Instructor Ribbon

Developmental Special Duty Ribbon (Air and Space Forces)

Guard ribbons

Navy Ceremonial Guard Ribbon

Marine Corps Security Guard Ribbon

Professional development Ribbons

Army NCO Professional Development Ribbon

Air Force NCO PME Graduate Ribbon

Basic training honor graduate ribbons

Navy Basic Military Training Honor Graduate Ribbon

Air Force Basic Military Training Honor Graduate Ribbon

Coast Guard Basic Training Honor Graduate Ribbon

Training ribbons

Army Service Ribbon

Air and Space Training Ribbon

Marksmanship awards

Small Arms Expert Marksmanship Ribbon (Air and Space Forces)

Navy Rifle Marksmanship Ribbon

Coast Guard Rifle Marksmanship Ribbon

Navy Pistol Marksmanship Ribbon

Coast Guard Pistol Marksmanship Ribbon

Note: The precedence of the Purple Heart was immediately before the Good Conduct Medals until changed to its current precedence in 1985.

=== Military departments ===
- Inter-service
- Army
- Navy and Marine Corps
- Air Force and Space Force
- Coast Guard

To denote additional achievements or multiple awards of the same decoration, the United States military maintains a number of award devices which are pinned to service ribbons and medals.

== Inactive and obsolete awards ==
U.S. military personnel having received these awards have participated within these areas of combat/conflict during the time these awards were given to U.S. service members. Such awards have since been discontinued or are no longer applicable in terms of receiving these commendations. Certain decorations remain inactive at this time (e.g. National Defense Service Medal) but may be reactivated at a later date in the future.

Ribbon/award name
Personal decorations
Certificate of Merit Medal

Marine Corps Brevet Medal

Specially Meritorious Service Medal
Reserve Special Commendation Ribbon
Army Wound Ribbon
Department of Transportation military awards
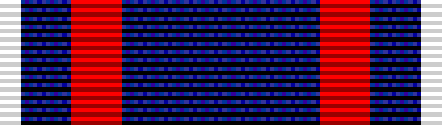
Transportation Distinguished Service Medal
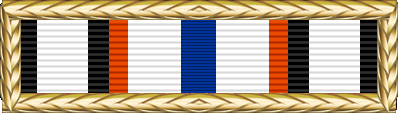
Secretary of Transportation Outstanding Unit Award
Coast Guard Bicentennial Unit Commendation
19th and early 20th century Commemorative Medals
West Indies Naval Campaign Medal (Sampson Medal)
Battle of Manila Bay Medal (Dewey Medal)
United States Antarctic Expedition Medal
19th and early 20th century Campaign Medals
Civil War Campaign Medal
Indian Campaign Medal
China Campaign Medal (Army)

China Relief Expedition Medal (Navy)

Spanish–American War campaign and occupation medals
Spanish Campaign Medal
West Indies Campaign Medal
Spanish War Service Medal
Army of Cuban Occupation Medal
Cuban Pacification Medal (Army)

Cuban Pacification Medal (Navy)

Army of Puerto Rican Occupation Medal
Philippine–American War campaign medals
Philippine Campaign Medal
Philippine Congressional Medal
Navy & Marine Corps expedition medals

Nicaraguan Campaign Medal (1912)

Haitian Campaign Medal (1915 & 1920–1921)

Dominican Campaign Medal (1916)

Nicaraguan Campaign Medal (1926–1930)

Yangtze Service Medal

Ribbon/award name
World War I and Pre-World War I service medals
Mexican Service Medal
Mexican Border Service Medal
World War I Victory Medal
Army of Occupation of Germany Medal
World War II and Pre-World War II service medals
China Service Medal
American Defense Service Medal
Women's Army Corps Service Medal
American Campaign Medal

Asiatic-Pacific Campaign Medal

European-African-Middle Eastern Campaign Medal

World War II Victory Medal
Post World War II, Cold War Service, Occupation Medals
Army of Occupation Medal

Navy Occupation Service Medal

Medal for Humane Action
National Defense Service Medal
Korean Service Medal
Vietnam Service Medal
Post Cold War Campaign Medals
Southwest Asia Service Medal
Kosovo Campaign Medal
Afghanistan Campaign Medal
Iraq Campaign Medal
Service and training decorations
Naval Reserve Medal
Marine Corps Reserve Ribbon
Fleet Marine Force Ribbon
Naval Reserve Meritorious Service Medal
Air Force Military Training Instructor Ribbon
Air Force Recruiter Ribbon
Marksmanship
Navy Distinguished Marksman and Pistol Shot Ribbon
Navy Distinguished Marksman Ribbon
Navy Distinguished Pistol Shot Ribbon

=== Discontinued or proposed ===
The following decorations were designed for issuance with an approved medal, but were either never officially approved for presentation or were discontinued before a first award could be made.

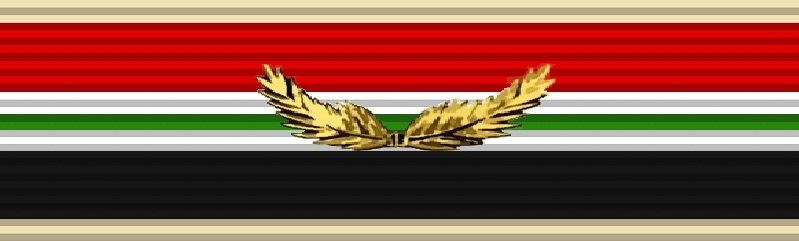
Ribbon/award name Personal decorations Distinguished Warfare Medal Combat service decorations Combat Recognition Ribbon	Ribbon/award name General service award Cold War Victory Medal Iraq Commitment Medal

=== Single service awards ===
Single service awards were official military decorations created as one time awards to recognize a single event. The first such single service award was issued during the Spanish–American War by the Revenue Cutter Service to honor the actions of the vessel USRC Hudson during the Battle of Cárdenas. The last single service award was issued in 1960 when Congress authorized the awarding of the Four Chaplains' Medal recognizing the Four Chaplains who died together during World War II. There have been no single service awards issued since by the U.S. military, mainly due to the decline and complications of awarding commemorative service medals.

Ribbon/award name Personal valor decorations Four Chaplains' Medal Personal commemorative decorations Cardenas Medal of Honor NC-4 Medal

Ribbon/award name Exploratory commemorative decorations Peary Polar Expedition Medal Byrd Antarctic Expedition Medal Second Byrd Antarctic Expedition Medal

=== Unofficial decorations ===
Unofficial decorations are those military awards created and issued by local commanders. In most cases, unofficial awards were designed to commemorate a specific battle or engagement of a commander's unit. The most well known unofficial awards were issued during the American Civil War.

Ribbon/award name
Civil War decorations
	Kearny Cross
Kearny Medal
	Butler Medal
No ribbon	Gillmore Medal

Ribbon/award name
Research decorations
Walter Reed Medal

After the Civil War, stricter military regulations prohibited local commanders from issuing awards and the practice had fallen into disuse by the 20th century. Even so, the Department of Defense has stated that large numbers of unofficial medals were privately issued to members of the Armed Forces of the United States for many years after the Civil War, mostly to commemorate specific battles, events, or as private veteran memorabilia. One of the more well known is the Walter Reed Medal (recognized today as a Congressional Gold Medal), awarded for exploratory scientific achievement in the field of malaria treatment. While presented as a gold medallion, members of the military were reported to wear a red ribbon on their uniforms to denote the decoration.

== Foreign and international awards ==
Foreign and international decorations are authorized for wear on United States military uniforms by the Department of Defense in accordance with established regulations for the receipt of such awards as outlined by the State Department. In the case of foreign decorations, the awards may be divided into senior service decorations (awarded only to high ranking U.S. officers), heroic decorations for valor, and foreign service decorations.

There are hundreds of foreign and international awards which have been approved for issuance to United States military personnel since World War I, the following being among the more common.

Ribbon/award name World War I French Legion of Honor British Order of the Bath French Military Medal French Croix de guerre Belgian Croix de guerre Czechoslovak War Cross (1918) Caribbean & Central America (1920s & 1930s) Order of Abdon Calderón (Ecuador) Military Merit Medal (Haiti) Medal of Merit (Nicaragua) World War II (Europe) French Croix de guerre Belgian Croix de guerre Luxembourg War Cross Czechoslovak War Cross (1945) Luxembourg War Cross (Unit Citation) World War II (Pacific) Philippine Defense Medal Philippine Liberation Medal Philippine Independence Medal Philippine Presidential Unit Citation World War II (Senior Orders) Order of Adolphe of Nassau (Luxembourg) Order of the Aztec Eagle (Mexico) Order of the British Empire (United Kingdom) Order of the Crown (Belgium) Order of Leopold (Belgium) Order of Orange-Nassau (Netherlands) Order of Ouissam Alaouite (Morocco) Order of Pao Ting (China) Order of Virtuti Militari (Poland) Order of the White Eagle (Poland) Order of the White Eagle (Yugoslavia) Order of William (Netherlands) Korean War - South Korea and the United Nations United Nations Service Medal Republic of Korea War Service Medal Republic of Korea Presidential Unit Citation

Ribbon/award name Vietnam War - Republic of Vietnam (South Vietnam) RVN Army Distinguished Service Order RVN Navy Distinguished Service Order RVN Air Force Distinguished Service Order RVN Military Merit Medal RVN Gallantry Cross (with Palm) RVN Air Gallantry Cross RVN Navy Gallantry Cross RVN Armed Forces Honor Medal RVN Civil Actions Medal (1st class) RVN Staff Service Medal RVN Special Service Medal RVN Training Service Medal RVN Presidential Unit Citation RVN Gallantry Cross Unit Citation with palm and frame RVN Civil Actions Medal Unit Citation with palm and frame (1st class) RVN Campaign Medal with 1960- device Persian Gulf War Kuwait Liberation Medal (Kuwait) Kuwait Liberation Medal (Saudi Arabia) International Awards (20th Century) United Nations Medal Multinational Force and Observers Medal Inter-American Defense Board Medal NATO Medal (Yugoslavia) NATO Medal (Kosovo) NATO Medal (Non-Article 5) Senior Military Awards (21st Century) Aeronautical Merit Cross (Peru) Cross of Honor (Germany) Khalifiyyeh Order of Bahrain Military Merit Order (United Arab Emirates) Order of the Crown of Thailand Order of the Date Palm (Iraq) Order of May (Argentina) Order of the Sword (Sweden) Order of Merit (Germany) Order of Merit of the Italian Republic Order of National Security Merit (Korea) Order of the Rising Sun (Japan) Order of the Southern Cross (Brazil)

During the First and Second World Wars, the Croix de Guerre medals of France and Belgium, as well as the French Military Medal and Luxembourg War Cross, were further issued as unit citation cords, known as Fourragère. Service members could receive both the individual award and the unit cord; in the case of the later, the unit citation could either be worn temporarily while a member of the unit or permanently if the service member was present during the actual battle which warranted the unit citation. A further unit citation cord of the Order of William of the Netherlands was also issued during World War II, and was far more commonly known as the "Orange Lanyard".

As of 2002, South Korea has again issued the Korean Presidential Unit Citation to certain units of the United States Marine Corps, thus placing this previously obsolete foreign award back on the active order of precedence for U.S. decorations. Apart from this one decoration, most 21st century foreign military awards are reserved for only the most senior flag and general officers and then only presented as "end of tour" decorations upon transfer from a major command.

== See also ==
- Awards and decorations of the United States government
  - Merchant Marine
  - Awards and decorations of the Public Health Service
  - Awards and decorations of the National Oceanic and Atmospheric Administration
  - Civilian decorations of the United States
  - Awards and decorations of the National Guard
  - Awards and decorations of the State Defense Forces
  - Military decorations of the Cold War
    - Awards and decorations of the Vietnam War
- United States military award devices
- Military badges of the United States
  - Badges of the United States Air Force
  - Badges of the United States Army
  - Badges of the United States Coast Guard
  - Badges of the United States Marine Corps
  - Badges of the United States Navy
  - Badges of the United States Space Force
  - Obsolete badges of the United States military
  - Identification badges of the uniformed services of the United States
- Unofficial combat badges of the United States Army
- List of military decorations
- State decoration
- Army-Navy "E" Award
- Medal inflation
