= EPOY =

EPOY may refer to:

- Environmental Photographer of the Year award, UK-based award from CIWEM
- Enlisted Person of the Year Ribbon, award of the United States Coastguard Service
