= Achievement Medal =

Military decoration of the United States Armed Forces

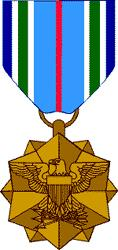
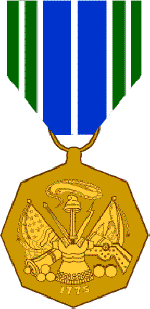
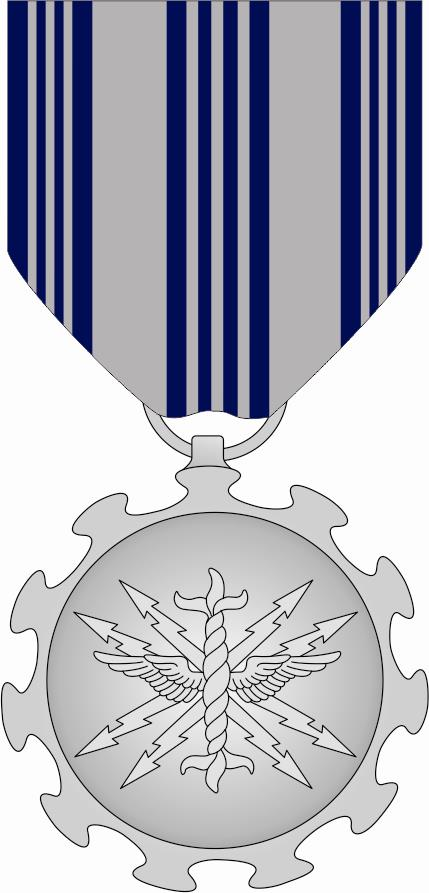
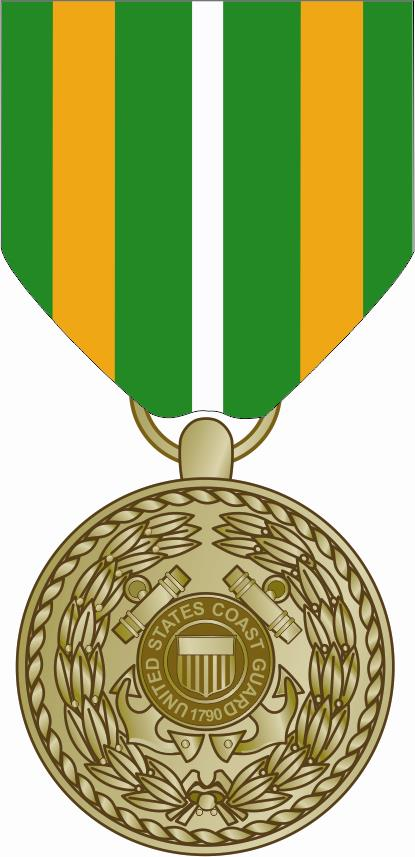
- Five Achievement Medals are awarded by branch or service. From left to right (Top): Joint Service, Army, Navy & Marine Corps, Air Force & Space Force, and (at bottom) Coast Guard.
- Type: Medal (decoration)
- Awarded for: "Meritorious service or achievement in either combat or noncombat situations based on sustained performance or specific achievement of a superlative nature but which does not warrant a Commendation Medal or higher."
- Presented by: United States Department of Defense; United States Department of the Army; United States Department of the Navy; United States Department of the Air Force; United States Department of Homeland Security
- Eligibility: Military personnel only
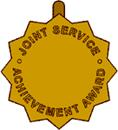
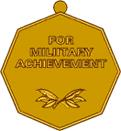
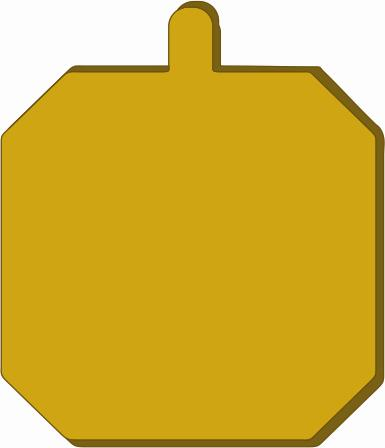
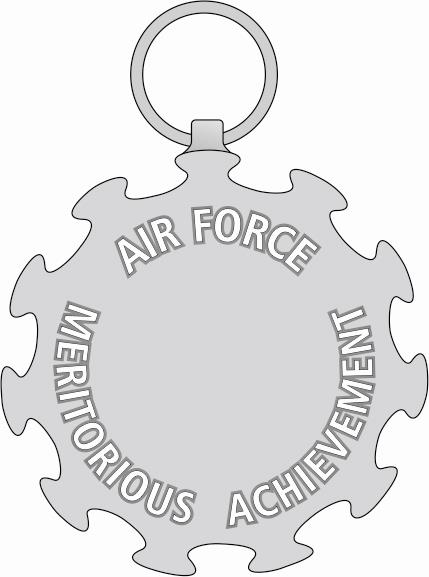
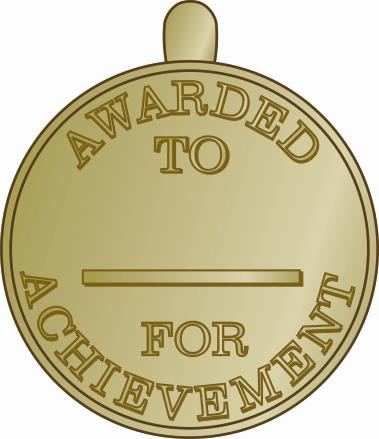
- Reverse: Joint Service Army Navy USAF USCG
- Status: Currently awarded
- Established: Naval Service (1961); Coast Guard (1963); Army (1981); Air and Space Forces (1980); Joint Service (1983)
- Service ribbons for the Joint Service, Army, Naval & Marine Corps Service, Air and Space Forces, and Coast Guard Achievement Medals

Precedence
- Next (higher): Service commendation medals
- Next (lower): Army: Prisoner of War Medal; Naval Service: Combat Action Ribbon; Air and Space Forces: Combat Action Medal; Coast Guard: Commandant's Letter of Commendation Ribbon

The Achievement Medal is a military decoration of the United States Armed Forces. The Achievement Medal was first proposed as a means to recognize outstanding achievement or meritorious service of military personnel who were not eligible to receive the higher Commendation Medal or the Meritorious Service Medal.

Each military service issues its own version of the Achievement Medal, with a fifth version authorized by the U.S. Department of Defense for joint military activity. The Achievement Medal is awarded for outstanding achievement or meritorious service not of a nature that would otherwise warrant awarding the Commendation Medal. Award authority rests with local commanders, granting a broad discretion of when and for what action the Achievement Medal may be awarded.

== History ==
The Navy and Marine Corps ribbon bar of the Achievement Medal with "V" device denoting combat bravery. The "V" device ceased being awarded with Achievement Medals in 2016.

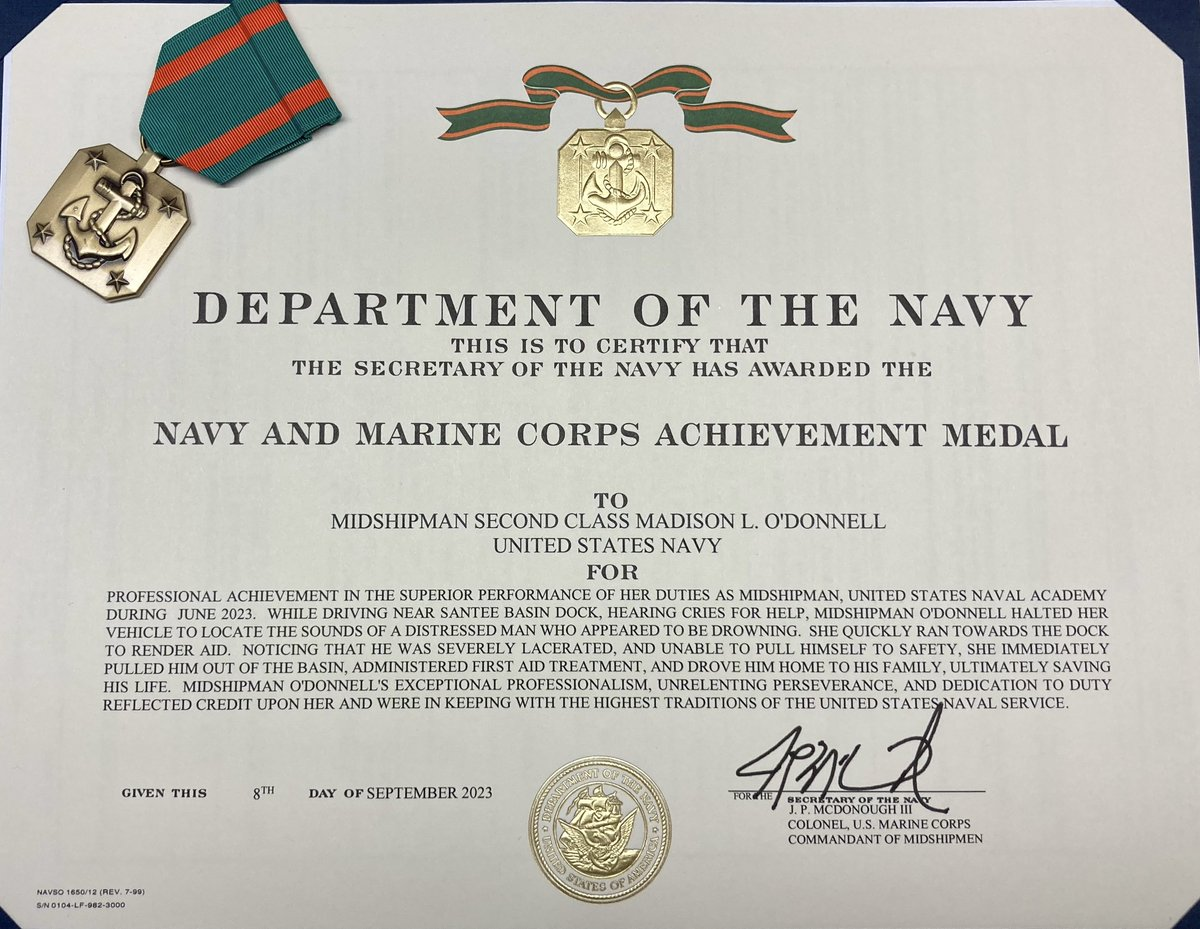
Certificate of a Navy and Marine Corps Achievement Medal awarded in 2023 to a midshipman

=== Navy and Marine Corps ===
The Navy and Marine Corps Achievement Medal (NAM), is the United States Navy and U.S. Marine Corps' version of the Achievement Medal. The U.S. Navy was the first branch of the U.S. Armed Forces to award such a medal, doing so in 1961, when it was dubbed the "Secretary of the Navy Commendation for Achievement Medal." This title was shortened in 1967 to simply, the "Navy Achievement Medal." On August 19, 1994, to recognize those of the United States Marine Corps who had received the Navy Achievement Medal, the name of the decoration was officially changed to the "Navy and Marine Corps Achievement Medal". The award is still often referred to in shorthand speech as the "Navy Achievement Medal" or "NAM" for short.

==== Chain of command approval ====
From its inception in the early 1960s to 2002, the Navy and Marine Corps Achievement Medal could not be approved by the commanding officers of ships, submarines, aviation squadron, or shore activities who held the rank of Commander (O-5). Awards for crewmembers had to be submitted to the Commodore or Air Wing Commander or the first appropriate O-6 in the chain of command for approval, who then signed the award and returned it. This led to a dramatically lower awarding rate when compared to similar size units in the Army or Air Force awarding their own achievement medals, especially considering that those services did not establish their respective achievement medals until the 1980s. Since 2002 the commanding officers of aviation squadrons and ships have had the authority to award NAMs without submission to higher authority. This is in contrast to the Army, where battalion commanders or the first O-5 in a soldier's chain of command are the authorizing official.

=== Army, Air Force, Space Force, and Coast Guard ===
The United States Coast Guard created its own Coast Guard Achievement Medal in 1967; the U.S. Army and U.S. Air Force and U.S. Space Force issued their own versions of the award with the Army Achievement Medal (AAM) in 1981 and Air Force Achievement Medal (AFAM) in 1980. Effective 11 September 2001, the Army Achievement Medal may be awarded in a combat area. Since this change over sixty thousand Army Achievement Medals have been awarded in theaters of operations such as Iraq and Afghanistan. On 16 November 2020, the Air Force Achievement Medal was renamed to the Air and Space Achievement Medal (ASAM) by the Secretary of the Air Force.

=== Joint Service Achievement Medal ===
The Joint Service Achievement Medal (JSAM) was created in 1983. This award was considered a Department of Defense decoration senior to the service department Achievement Medals.

== Ribbon devices ==
The following devices may be authorized to be worn on the following achievement medals suspension ribbon and service ribbon:

- All Achievement Medals – "C" and "R" devices, which respectively signify meritorious performance "under combat conditions" or lethal effects in a combat zone from a remote location after January 2016
- Joint Service Achievement Medal (all service branches) – for additional awards, oak leaf clusters
- Army Achievement Medal – for additional awards, oak leaf clusters
- Navy and Marine Corps Achievement Medal – for additional awards, 5/16 inch stars
- Air and Space Achievement Medal – for additional awards, oak leaf clusters
- Coast Guard Achievement Medal – for additional awards, 5/16 inch stars
- Coast Guard Achievement Medal – Operational Distinguishing Device ("O" device)
- Coast Guard Achievement Medal – Combat Distinguishing Device (Combat "V")

=== Former ribbon devices ===
The following ribbon devices were authorized in the past but have now been discontinued:

- Air Force Achievement Medal – "V" Device until December 2016
- Navy and Marine Corps Achievement Medal – Combat Distinguishing Device (Combat "V") until December 2016

== See also ==
- Awards and decorations of the United States government
- Awards and decorations of the United States Armed Forces
- Awards and decorations of the United States Coast Guard
- Navy Civilian Service Achievement Medal
- Public Health Service Achievement Medal
- NOAA Corps Achievement Medal
