= Outstanding Airman of the Year Ribbon =

United States Air Force award

- Outstanding Airman of the Year Ribbon
- Type: Ribbon
- Presented by: the Department of the Air Force
- Eligibility: Airmen nominated by their Major Command, Field Operating Agency, or Direct Reporting Unit for competition in the 12 Outstanding Airmen of the Year Program
- Status: Currently awarded
- Established: 21 February 1968
- Ribbon with service star denoting selection as one of 12 Outstanding Airmen of the Year, and oak leaf cluster denoting two nominations to the Air Force wide competition.

Precedence
- Next (higher): Air Reserve Forces Meritorious Service Medal
- Equivalent: Coast Guard: Enlisted Person of the Year Ribbon
- Next (lower): Air and Space Recognition Ribbon

The Outstanding Airman of the Year Ribbon is a military award of the United States Air Force which was created on February 21, 1968 by order of Secretary of the Air Force Harold Brown. The first presentation of the award was in June 1970. The Outstanding Airman of the Year Ribbon is the highest personal ribbon award of the United States Air Force.

== Criteria ==
The Outstanding Airman of the Year Ribbon is awarded to any enlisted member of the U.S. Air Force who is nominated by their Major Command, Field Operating Agency, or Direct Reporting Unit for competition in the (formerly "12", until Feb. 2025) Outstanding Airmen of the Year Program. The Outstanding Airman of the Year program recognizes 12 enlisted members from a cross section of Air Force Career fields. Nominated personnel compete in one of three categories Airman, Non-commissioned Officer, and Senior Non-commissioned Officer. Nominations are based only on the member's performance and achievement for the prior calendar year. Though only the prior year is used for nominations, nominees must pass a certain level of scrutiny for their total life and career since nominees are expected to be the most outstanding representatives of the Air Force enlisted force.

== Appearance ==
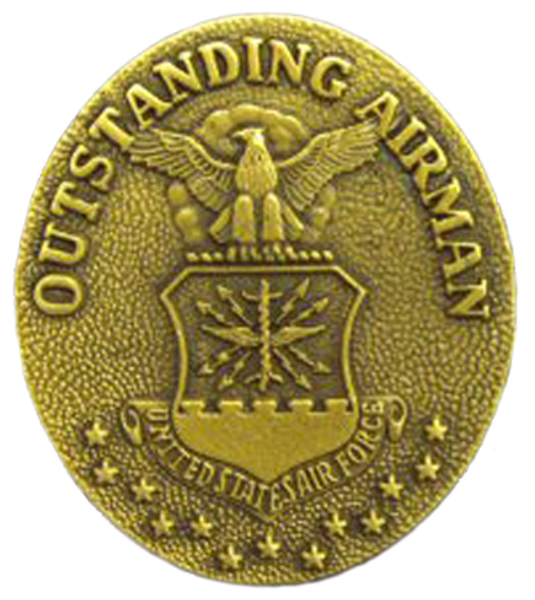
Outstanding Airman Badge

The Outstanding Airman of the Year Ribbon is light blue with a center stripe of white, flanked on either side by thin stripes of dark blue and red.

Airmen selected as one of the 12 Outstanding Airmen of the Year are authorized to wear the Outstanding Airman badge for one year, and are awarded the ribbon with a bronze service star. All other nominated competitors are authorized to wear the ribbon without the service star. Subsequent awards of the ribbon are represented by oak leaf clusters, with the service star being worn to the wearers right.
