= Army Service Ribbon =

Military award of the United States Army

- The Army Service Ribbon
- Type: Ribbon
- Awarded for: Completion of any Advanced Individual Training.
- Presented by: the Department of the Army
- Status: Current
- First award: 1 August 1981; 45 years ago

Precedence
- Next (higher): Noncommissioned Officer Professional Development Ribbon
- Next (lower): Army Overseas Service Ribbon

The Army Service Ribbon (ASR) is a military award of the United States Army that was established by the Secretary of the Army on 10 April 1981 as announced in Department of the Army General Order 15, dated 10 October 1990. The Navy, Marine Corps, and Coast Guard have no equivalent to the Army Service Ribbon.

== History ==
Effective 1 August 1981, the Army Service Ribbon is awarded to all members of the regular (active) Army, and Army National Guard and United States Army Reserve in an active reserve status, for successful completion of initial-entry training, which for officers is considered to be successful completion of their basic/orientation or higher-level course. Enlisted Soldiers are awarded the ribbon upon successful completion of their initial military occupational specialty (MOS)–producing course. If a Soldier is assigned an MOS based on skills acquired as a civilian or member of a sister-service (e.g., USAF), the ribbon is awarded after completion of 4 months of honorable active service.

The ribbon may be awarded retroactively to those personnel who completed the required training before 1 August 1981, provided they had an Active Army status as defined above on or after 1 August 1981.

For those service-members who completed initial entry training prior to 1981, the Army Service Ribbon is retroactively awarded, provided the service-member was still on active duty after 1981. For those service-members who are appointed or enlist in the Army after serving with a sister-service (and who may not be required to complete Army initial entry training) the Army Service Ribbon is awarded after four months of active service.

The Army Service Ribbon is presented as a one-time award only, i.e., no subsequent awards are authorized. The United States Air Force equivalent of the Army Service Ribbon is the Air Force Training Ribbon. Neither the U.S. Navy nor the U.S. Marine Corps has a direct equivalent, though the Navy awards the Basic Training Honor Graduate Ribbon to the top 3% of each Navy recruit graduating class.

The Army Service Ribbon is a multi-colored (red, orange, yellow, green, and blue) ribbon to represent the entire spectrum of military specialties in which officers and enlisted Soldiers may enter upon completion of their initial training.

== See also ==
- Awards and decorations of the United States Army
- Basic Training Honor Graduate Ribbon
