= Defense Superior Service Medal =

United States Defense Department superior service medal

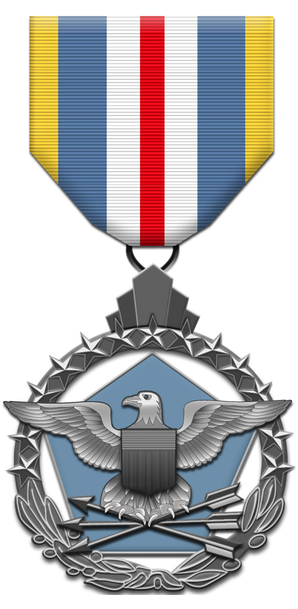
- Type: Military medal
- Awarded for: Superior meritorious service in a position of significant responsibility
- Presented by: United States Department of Defense
- Eligibility: United States Armed Forces service members
- Status: Currently awarded
- Established: 6 February 1976
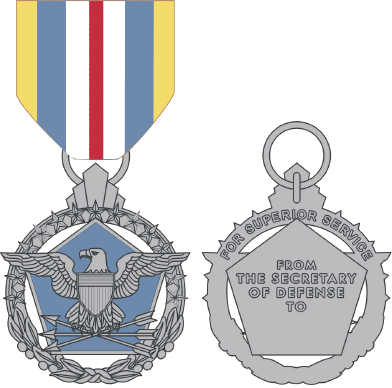
- Service ribbon

Precedence
- Next (higher): Silver Star Medal
- Next (lower): Legion of Merit

The Defense Superior Service Medal (DSSM) is a military decoration of the United States Department of Defense, which is presented to United States Armed Forces service members who perform superior meritorious service in a position of significant responsibility.

It is most often presented to general and flag officers, followed by a lesser number of Army, Marine Corps, Air Force, and Space Force colonels and Navy and Coast Guard captains. Presented in the name of the United States Secretary of Defense, it was established by President Gerald R. Ford on February 6, 1976, in Executive Order 11904. It is analogous and senior to the Legion of Merit, albeit awarded for service in a joint duty capacity.

== Criteria ==
The Defense Superior Service Medal is the United States Department of Defense's second-highest non-combat-related military award and the second-highest joint service decoration. It is given by the Secretary of Defense to members of the United States Armed Forces who render superior meritorious service in a position of great responsibility. This service must be part of a joint activity. The award is generally for a period of time exceeding 12 months and encompassing an entire joint assignment. Service members assigned to or attached to a Joint Task Force as individuals, not members of a specific military service's unit, can be eligible. It has also been awarded to a small cohort of U.S. military officers serving as astronauts for service leading up to and during Space Shuttle missions carrying classified and unclassified Department of Defense payloads. In these cases, the 12-month time period was considered to include the training period prior to that flight, which typically exceeded a year in duration.

Members of service-specific units are eligible for awards of personal decorations from their parent service. The DSSM specifically recognizes exceptionally superior service, and to honor a person's accomplishments over a sustained period. Joint or Department of Defense awards, including the DSSM, may be awarded posthumously.

== Appearance ==
At its time of creation, it was decided the DSSM would be obtained at the lowest possible cost and with as little involvement as possible. For these reasons, and because it would rank just below the Defense Distinguished Service Medal for similar service, it was decided to use the same design as the Defense Distinguished Service Medal, finished in silver rather than gold, and with the inscriptions on the medal's reverse appropriately modified.

The medal is made of a silver-colored metal with blue enamel, and is 1 7/8 inches (4.8 cm) high. The obverse depicts a silver American eagle superimposed over a medium blue pentagon. The eagle has outstretched wings, with the shield of the United States charged on its breast. In its talons are three crossed arrows in silver. The tips of the wings cover a surrounding arc of silver five-pointed stars encircling the top and sides of the pentagon, while the bottom is surrounded by a silver wreath encircling the base composed of a laurel branch on the left and an olive branch on the right.

The reverse is plain except for the inscription at the top, For Superior Service. Below in the pentagon is the inscription From The Secretary of Defense To.

The medal is suspended from a ribbon 1 3/8 inches (3.5 cm) wide composed of these vertical stripes: Golden Yellow 3/16 inch (0.48 cm), Bluebird 1/4 inch (0.64 cm), White 3/16 inch (0.48 cm), Scarlet 1/8 inch (0.32 cm), White 3/16 inch (0.48 cm), Bluebird 1/4 inch (0.64 cm) Golden Yellow 3/16 inch (0.48 cm).

Subsequent awards of the Defense Superior Service Medal are denoted by oak leaf clusters worn on the suspension and service ribbons of the medal.
