= Iraq Campaign Medal =

American campaign medal

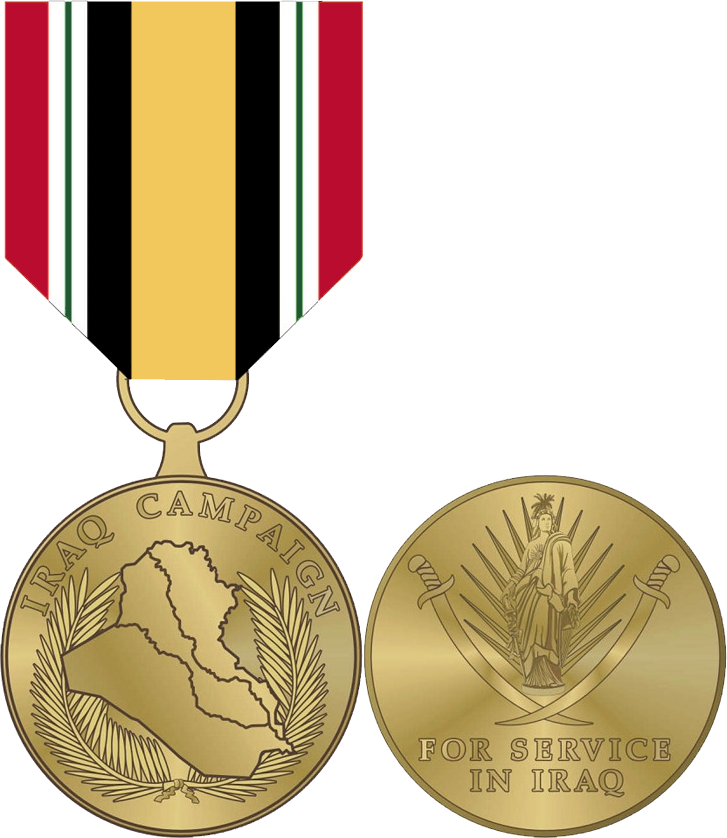
- Obverse and reverse
- Type: Military medal Campaign medal
- Awarded for: Service in Iraq during the Iraq War (from 19 March 2003 to 31 December 2011)
- Presented by: U.S. Department of Defense
- Eligibility: U.S. military personnel
- Status: Inactive
- Established: 29 November 2004
- First award: 2005 (retroactive to 19 March 2003)
- Service ribbon and campaign streamer

Precedence
- Next (higher): Afghanistan Campaign Medal
- Next (lower): Inherent Resolve Campaign Medal
- Related: Global War on Terrorism Expeditionary Medal

The Iraq Campaign Medal (ICM) was a military award of the United States Armed Forces which was created by Executive Order 13363 of U.S. President George W. Bush on 29 November 2004, and became available for general distribution in June 2005. The medal was designed by the U.S. Army Institute of Heraldry and was awarded during the Iraq War, from 19 March 2003 to 31 December 2011.

== Appearance ==
The medal is bronze in appearance, 1 1/4 inches (32 mm) in diameter. The obverse depicts a north-oriented relief of the map of Iraq, surmounted by two lines representing the Tigris and Euphrates rivers throughout, superimposed over a palm wreath. Above is the inscription "IRAQ CAMPAIGN." On the reverse, the Statue of Freedom surmounts a sunburst, encircled by two scimitars pointing down with the blades crossing at the tips. Below is the inscription "FOR SERVICE IN IRAQ." The medal is suspended from a ribbon 1 3/8 inches (35 mm) wide. The stripes of the ribbon invoke the colors of the Iraqi flag and are: 5/32 inch scarlet at the edges, followed by 1/16 inch white, 1/32 inch green, and 1/16 inch white. The white is separated by a 5/32 inch black with a 7/16 inch stripe in chamois in the center.

== Criteria ==
The Iraq Campaign Medal was awarded to any member of the U.S. military who performed duty within the borders of Iraq (or its territorial waters) for a period of thirty consecutive days or sixty non-consecutive days. The medal was awarded retroactively from 19 March 2003 until the end of Operation New Dawn on 31 December 2011.

Personnel who engaged in combat with an enemy force, or personnel wounded in combat or wounded as a result of a terrorist attack within Iraq received the Iraq Campaign Medal regardless of the number of days spent within the country.

In addition, each day participating in aerial missions as a "regularly assigned air crewmember of an aircraft flying sorties into, out of, within or over Iraq and in direct support of the military operations" established a single day of eligibility. When the required minimum days of eligibility were accrued, the medal was then awarded.

The medal was also awarded posthumously to any service member who died in the line of duty within Iraq, including from non-combat injuries such as accidents and mishaps.

On 23 April 2012, an order terminating the award of the Iraq Campaign Medal was issued by the Department of Defense. The order is effective to 31 December 2011, the day Operation New Dawn ended. U.S. military personnel serving inside the borders of Iraq after December 2011 will not be eligible to receive the ICM.

=== Global War on Terrorism Expeditionary Medal ===
The Iraq Campaign Medal replaced the Global War on Terrorism Expeditionary Medal (GWOT-EM) for service in Iraq from 19 March 2003, through 30 April 2005. Personnel who previously received the GWOT-EM for Iraq service were given the option to exchange the medal for the Iraq Campaign Medal. The medals were not authorized for the same period of service in Iraq, and any Iraq service which followed the Iraq Campaign Medal's creation was recognized only with the ICM.

=== Operation Inherent Resolve ===
U.S. military personnel serving post-2014 in the Iraq conflict were originally awarded the Global War on Terrorism Expeditionary Medal (GWOT-EM) and not the Iraq Campaign Medal as the latter conflict had ended and the former conflict was nameless at the time and the U.S. government did not designate the fighting to be a military campaign. However, the U.S. government dubbed their operations in Iraq post-2014 as "Operation Inherent Resolve", and in March 2016, the Inherent Resolve Campaign Medal (IRCM) was created. The IRCM is now awarded to those who have served in missions in Iraq against ISIL from 15 June 2014 to the 30 JUNE 2022. Those who were awarded the GWOT-EM for serving in Iraq from 15 June 2014 to 30 March 2016, request the Inherent Resolve Campaign Medal instead.

== Campaign phases and devices ==
The following are the approved campaign phases and respective inclusive dates for the Iraqi Campaign Medal:

Phase	From	To
Liberation of Iraq	19 March 2003	1 May 2003
Transition of Iraq	2 May 2003	28 June 2004
Iraqi Governance	29 June 2004	15 December 2005
National Resolution	16 December 2005	9 January 2007
Iraqi Surge	10 January 2007	31 December 2008
Iraqi Sovereignty	1 January 2009	31 August 2010
New Dawn	1 September 2010	15 December 2011

Examples of campaign stars worn on the Iraqi Campaign Medal service ribbon:

Any one of the seven phases
Two of the seven phases
Three of the seven phases
Four of the seven phases
Five of the seven phases
Six of the seven phases
All seven phases

The following ribbon devices are authorized for wear on the Iraqi Campaign Medal:

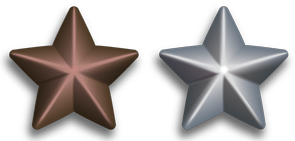
- Campaign stars (all branches)
- Arrowhead device (Army and Air Force)
- Fleet Marine Force Combat Operation Insignia (Navy personnel assigned to a Marine Corps unit in combat)

== Notable recipients ==
- Phyllis J. Wilson, 5th Command Chief Warrant Officer of the United States Army Reserve
- Paul Ray Smith, MOH recipient April 2003.

== See also ==
- Awards and decorations of the United States Armed Forces
- Afghanistan Campaign Medal
- Global War on Terrorism Expeditionary Medal
- Global War on Terrorism Service Medal
- Iraq Commitment Medal
- United Kingdom Iraq Medal (2003–2011)
- United Kingdom Iraq Medal (post-2003)
