= Navy Unit Commendation =

US Navy award

- The Navy Unit Commendation ribbon
- Type: Service ribbon (decoration)
- Awarded for: Outstanding heroism in action against the enemy or extremely meritorious service (non-combat) in support of military operations.
- Presented by: the Department of the Navy
- Eligibility: U.S. Navy, Marine Corps, Army, Air Force, and Coast Guard units; and friendly foreign armed forces units serving with the U.S. Armed Forces
- Status: Currently awarded
- Established: December 1944
- Final award: Ongoing
- Streamer

Precedence
- Next (higher): Joint Meritorious Unit Award
- Equivalent: Army: Valorous Unit Award; Air and Space Forces: Gallant Unit Citation; Coast Guard: Coast Guard Unit Commendation; Department of Transportation: Secretary of Transportation Outstanding Unit Award
- Next (lower): Meritorious Unit Commendation

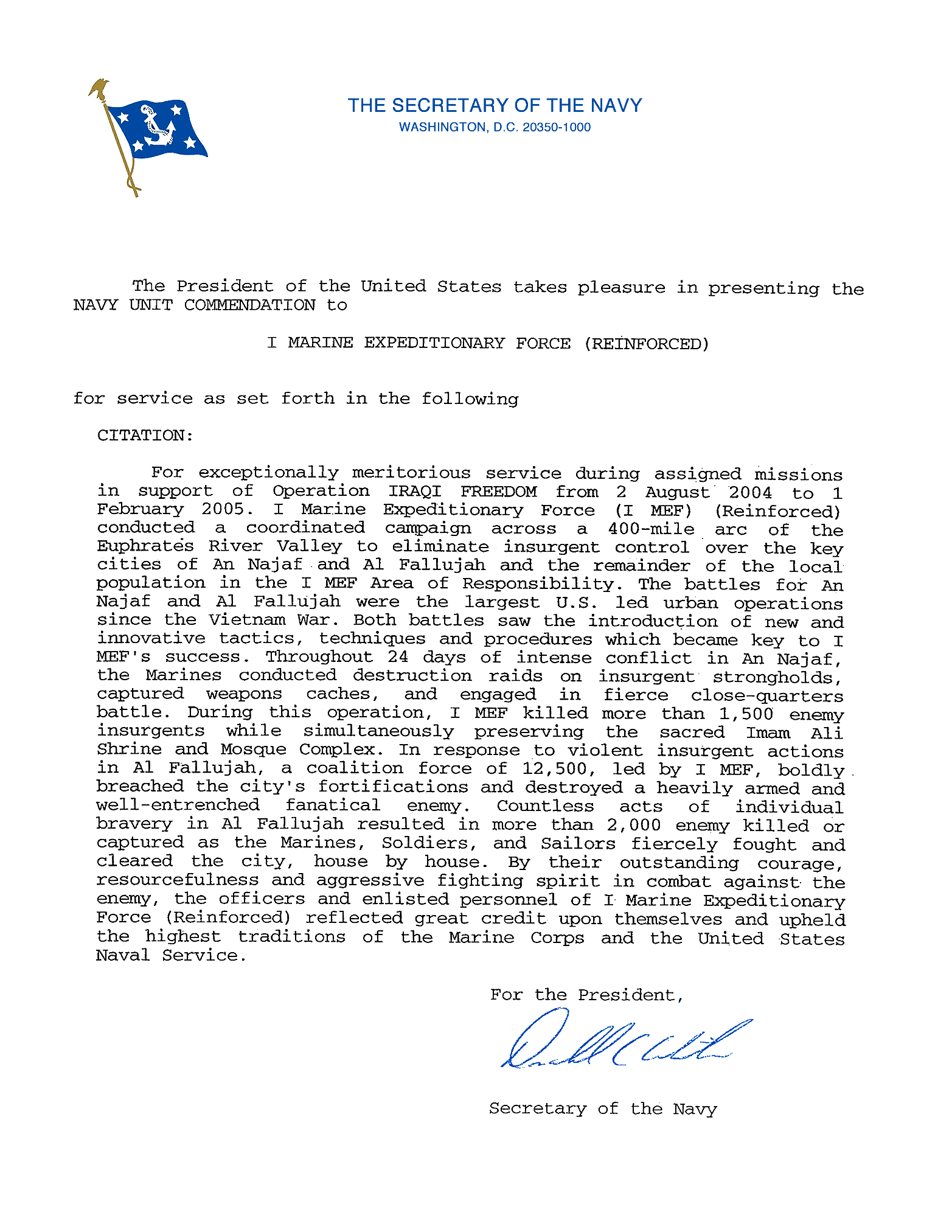
An official Navy Unit Commendation, 2004-2005

The Navy Unit Commendation (NUC) is a United States Navy and United States Coast Guard unit award that was established by order of the Secretary of the Navy James Forrestal on 18 December 1944.

== History ==
Navy and U.S. Marine Corps commands may recommend any Navy or Marine Corps unit for the NUC that has distinguished itself by outstanding heroism in action against the enemy, but not sufficient to justify the award of the Presidential Unit Citation. A unit must have performed service of a character comparable to that which would merit the award of a Silver Star Medal for heroism, or a Legion of Merit for non-combat meritorious service to an individual. Normal performance of duty or participation in many combat missions does not, in itself, justify the award. An award will not be made to a unit for actions of one or more of its component parts, unless the unit performed uniformly as a team, in a manner justifying collective recognition.

U.S. Army, U.S. Air Force, U.S. Space Force, and U.S Coast Guard units are also eligible to be awarded the NUC as long as they are directly attached or assigned to U.S. Navy or Marine Corps units during the time period or event for which the award is given. U.S. Army members of units awarded the NUC wear the Navy Unit Commendation ribbon on the right side of the uniform jacket rather than left side along with any other unit award emblems which are authorized for wear. The NUC may be conferred upon the armed forces of friendly foreign nations serving with the U.S. Armed Forces, provided such units meet the standards established for Navy and Marine Corps units.

Additional awards of the Navy Unit Commendation are denoted by 3/16 inch bronze stars.

== See also ==
- Military awards of the United States Armed Forces
- Military awards of the United States Department of the Navy
