= Reserve Special Commendation Ribbon =

- Ribbon bar of the Reserve Special Commendation
- Type: Ribbon only commendation
- Awarded for: 4 cumulative years in command of a battalion, squadron, or separate division between 1 January 1930 and 7 December 1941.
- Country: United States
- Presented by: Department of the Navy
- Eligibility: Officers of the Navy and Marine Corps Reserve
- Status: No longer awarded
- Established: 16 April 1946

Precedence
- Next (higher): Prisoner of War Medal
- Next (lower): Navy Good Conduct Medal

The Reserve Special Commendation Ribbon was an award of the United States Navy established on April 16, 1946. The ribbon was authorized by the Secretary of the Navy in recognition of service rendered in the period of January 1, 1930 to December 7, 1941.

The Reserve Special Commendation Ribbon was issued to officers of the Naval Reserve who had regularly commanded a Naval Reserve battalion, squadron, or "separate division" for a period of at least four years, or had commanded a Marine Corps Reserve battalion or squadron for the same period of time. To be eligible for the Reserve Special Commendation Ribbon, an officer must also have served at least ten years in the Naval Reserve as a whole.

The decoration was issued as a one-time-only award, and there were no devices authorized for additional awards of the Reserve Special Commendation Ribbon. The Reserve Special Commendation Ribbon end date was established on December 7, 1941, in light of the massive expansion and call-up of reserves for duty in World War II.

== See also ==
- Awards and decorations of the United States Armed Forces
