= Navy Civilian Service Commendation Medal =

U.S. Navy civilian medal

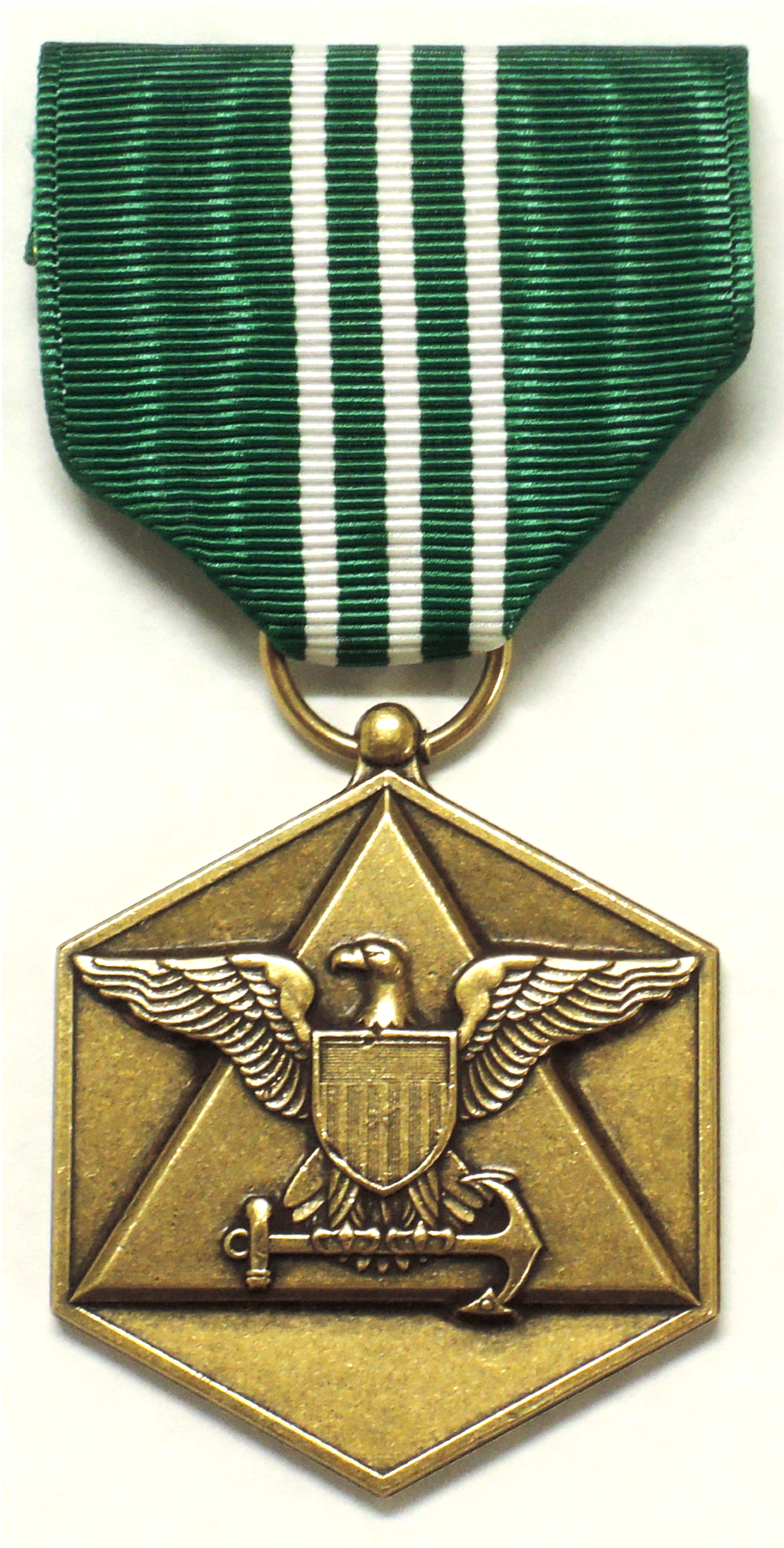
- Navy Civilian Service Commendation Medal
- Country: United States
- Presented by: Department of the Navy
- Eligibility: Civilian employees of the Department of the Navy and the Marine Corps
- Status: Active
- Established: April 24, 2018
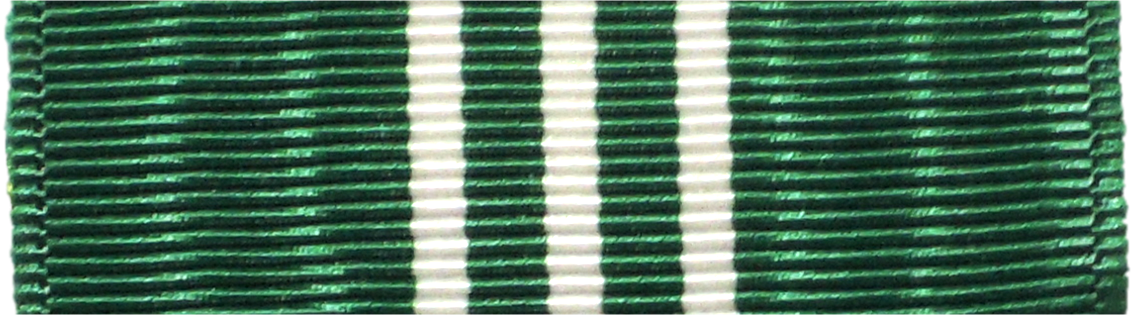
- Ribbon bar of the medal

Precedence
- Next (higher): Navy Meritorious Civilian Service Award
- Next (lower): Navy Civilian Service Achievement Medal

The Navy Civilian Service Commendation Medal is awarded to Department of the Navy and U.S. Marine Corps civilians who distinguish themselves by performing well above that which is usually expected of an individual commensurate with his or her grade or specialty, and above the degree of excellence which can be appropriately reflected in the individual's performance evaluations, or personnel records. The medal may be awarded after a significant achievement (such as an invention, or improvement in design, procedure, or organization) or after an extended period of time (such as a deployment or overseas tour). Recipients are recognized at the equivalent level of the Navy and Marine Corps Commendation Medal awarded to military personnel for similar achievement.

The award consists of a certificate and citation signed by the activity head, the medal on a suspension ribbon, and a lapel emblem. The award is the fourth highest Navy civilian award, ranking just behind the Navy Superior Civilian Service Award, and before the Navy Civilian Service Achievement Medal. The approval authority for the award is commanders in the rank of O-6 and above and civilians in equivalent positions and above. The earliest known medal presentation was to Bilyana Atova at Naval Support Activity Naples, Italy, Jan. 16, 2019.

== Medal and ribbon description ==
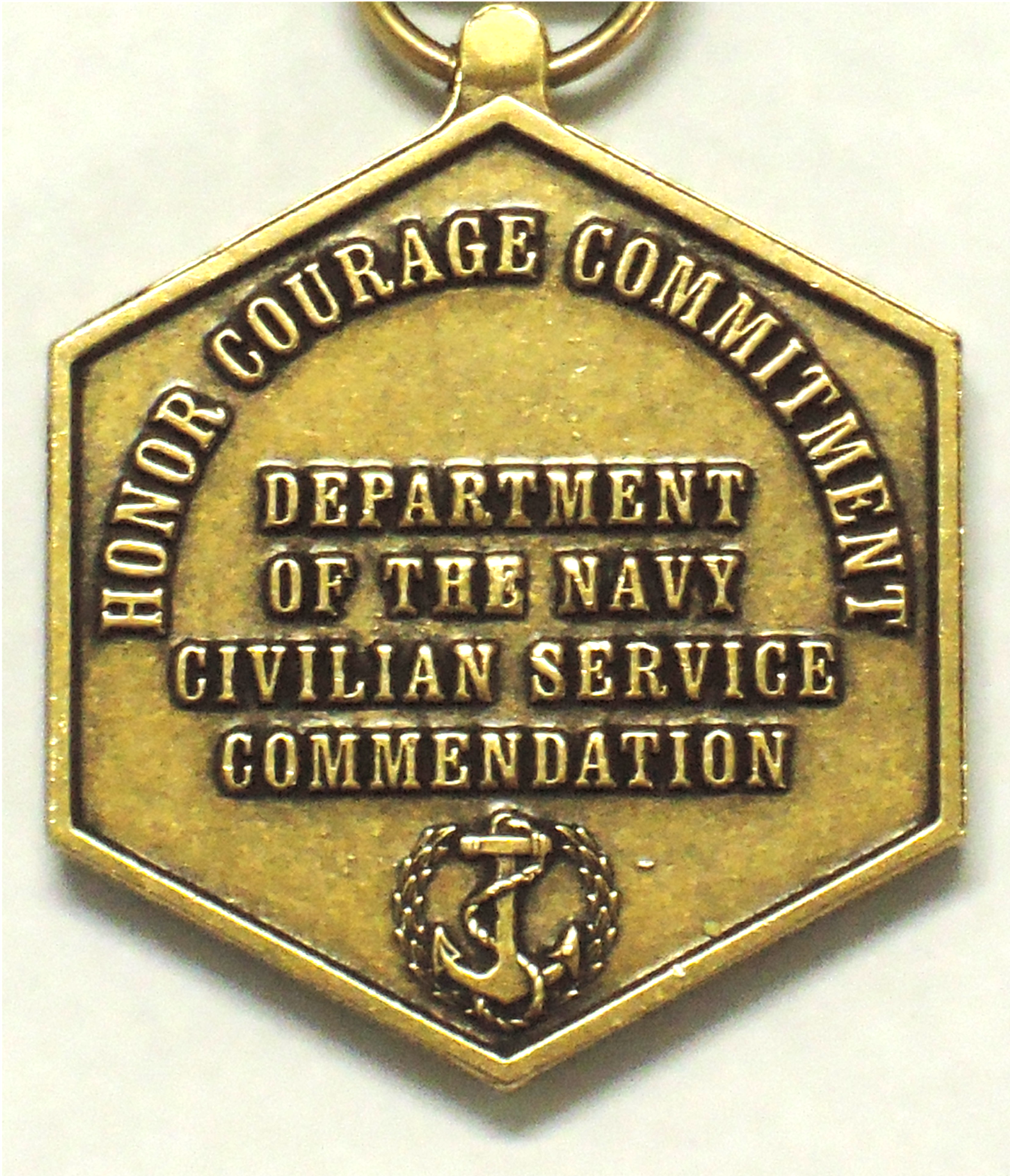
Reverse side of medal

The medal shape is a bronze hexagon. On the obverse is an eagle, perched on a horizontal anchor, with horizontally displayed wings and bearing a shield with thirteen strips and a broad band across the top. The eagle is adapted from the Navy and Marine Corps Commendation Medal, and the arrows were replaced with an anchor to denote civilian service in the Department of the Navy.

On the reverse of the medal, arched across the top, are the words "Honor Courage Commitment." In the center a stacked inscription reads "Department of the Navy Civilian Service Commendation," and at the bottom is a fouled anchor resting upon a laurel wreath. The anchor conveys service to the Navy while the laurel wreath is emblematic of achievement and honor. Together, the wreath and anchor characterize the Navy and Marine Corps core values of Honor, Courage, and Commitment.

The colors of the ribbon are myrtle green with three white stripes. These colors are consistent with the equivalent award for military service members (the Navy and Marine Corps Commendation Medal).

== Award recipients ==
1. Peggy A. Edwards 14 May 1994, Maintenance Secretary June 1956 - June 1994
2. Harry J. Geanuleas 23 September 2020, Navy Region Mid-Atlantic, RCC Great Lakes
3. Nathan Hodges 8 July 2021, Puget Sound Naval Shipyard
4. Travis C. Richardson 19 August 2022, Mobile Diving Salvage Unit ONE, Pearl Harbor, Hawaii
5. James A. Russell 15 August 2023, Naval Facilities Engineering Systems Command Mid-Atlantic
6. Ahmed Naser 24 April 2025, U.S Naval Support Activity Bahrain
7. Chevance Bailey 24 April 2025, U.S Naval Support Activity Bahrain
8. Umair Masood 24 April 2025, U.S Naval Support Activity Bahrain
9. Yusuf R. Mahchi 24 April 2025, U.S Naval Support Activity Bahrain
10. Edward M. McKinnon 31 December 2025, Naval Surface and Warfighting Development Center, San Diego
11. Amy M. Ryan 12 February 2026, Supervisor of Shipbuilding, Conversion and Repair (SUPSHIP), Groton
12. Jefferson L. Murray 31 March 2026, Center For Naval Aviation Technical Training
13. Connor J. Wacker 10 June 2026, Puget Sound Naval Shipyard
