= Drill Instructor Ribbon =

United States military award

A Drill Instructor Ribbon is a military award of the United States Armed Forces which is issued by the U.S. Navy, U.S. Air Force, U.S. Space Force, and U.S. Marine Corps. The Drill Instructor Ribbon recognizes those service members who are trained and qualified as military instructors to new recruits during initial basic training.

== Marine Corps ==
U.S. Marine Corps Drill Instructor Ribbon
- Marine Corps Drill Instructor Ribbon
- Type: Ribbon
- Presented by: the Department of the Navy
- Eligibility: Three years of service as a USMC drill instructor (or equivalent) at recruit training or officer candidates school
- Status: Current
- First award: July 15, 1997 (retroactive to October 6, 1952)

Precedence
- Next (higher): Marine Corps Recruiting Service Ribbon
- Next (lower): Marine Corps Security Guard Ribbon

The U.S. Marine Corps Drill Instructor Ribbon was created in July 1997 and recognizes those members of the United States Marine Corps who have successfully trained and qualified as Marine Corps Drill Instructors. To qualify, a Marine must hold the Military Occupational Specialty (MOS) of 0911 (Drill Instructor) or must have served a successful tour of duty in one of the following positions:

- Recruit Training Battalion Commander, Executive Officer, S-3, or Sergeant Major.
- Recruit Training Company Commander, Series Commander, or Assistant Series Commander.
- Marine Corps Officer Candidate Company First Sergeant, Company Gunnery Sergeant, or Platoon Commander.
- Naval Aviation Officer Candidate School (AOCS) First Sergeant, Battalion Gunnery Sergeant, or Class Drill Instructor (Navy AOCS has since been disestablished).

Furthermore, the duties of the Marine's billet must be executed satisfactorily for a minimum period of 20 months, for those who received their 8511 MOS before December 1996 or 30 months, for those who receive their 0911 MOS on or after 1 December 1996.

The Marine Corps Drill Instructor Ribbon is retroactively authorized to October 6, 1952. Multiple awards of the ribbon are denoted by service stars.

== Navy ==
Navy Accession Training Service Ribbon
- Navy Accession Training Service Ribbon
- Type: Ribbon
- Presented by: the Department of the Navy
- Eligibility: Completion of a tour of duty at a Navy training command
- Status: Current
- First award: March 1998 (retroactive to October 1995)

Precedence
- Next (higher): Navy Recruiting Service Ribbon
- Next (lower): Navy Ceremonial Duty Ribbon

The Navy Accession Training Service Ribbon was created in March 1998 by order of the Secretary of the Navy. The ribbon is retroactive to October 1995 and recognizes those officers and enlisted members of the United States (U.S.) Navy who meet the following criteria:

(1) Must have successfully completed the prescribed tour of duty at one of the following commands: (a) Naval Service Training Command (NSTC), (b) Recruit Training Command,(c) Officer Training Command, (d) Naval Reserve Officers Training Corps Units, (e) United States Naval Academy (USNA), (f) United States Naval Academy Preparatory School

(2) Must have maintained outstanding personal standards without any disciplinary incidents throughout the tour.

(3) Must have completed the tour on or after 1 October 1995.

Additional awards of the Navy Accession Training Service Ribbon are denoted by service stars.

== Air Force and Space Force ==
Developmental Special Duty Ribbon
- Developmental Special Duty Ribbon
- Type: Ribbon
- Presented by: the Department of the Air Force
- Eligibility: Any consecutive years of service as a USAF or USSF military training instructor (or equivalent) at recruit training or officer instruction school
- Status: Active
- First award: 2014

Precedence
- Next (higher): Air and Space Longevity Service Award
- Next (lower): Armed Forces Reserve Medal

The Developmental Special Duty Ribbon is the United States Air Force and United States Space Force equivalent of the Drill Instructor Ribbon, along with the recruiter ribbons. Created on 4 September 2014, the Special Duty Ribbon is awarded to any member of the Air Force or Space Force who completes any number of consecutive months of duty as a military training instructor or recruiter attached to Air Education and Training Command (AETC), the United States Air Force Academy, Space Training or Readiness Command, or the Air Force Recruiting Service. It may be awarded retroactively provided a service member was on active duty, or a member of a reserve component, as of December 1998.

Former Air Force Military Training Instructor ribbon

Additional awards of the Special Duty Ribbon are presented for each consecutive three year tour of duty as a military training instructor with such additional awards denoted by oak leaf clusters, and the award had replaced the previous Air Force Military Training Instructor Ribbon.

The Air Force also presents the Air Education and Training Command Instructor Badge for those military instructors who so qualify. Both the instructor badge and the Special Duty ribbon may be awarded simultaneously for the same tour of service.

== Army and Coast Guard ==
The U.S. Army and United States Coast Guard do not issue a ribbon award for those who are qualified drill instructors. The Army provides the Drill Sergeant Identification Badge while the Coast Guard provides the Company Commander Insignia.
