= Basic Training Honor Graduate Ribbon =

- Top: Navy ribbon Middle: Air and Space Forces ribbon Bottom: Coast Guard ribbon
- Type: Service ribbon
- Awarded for: Superior performance during basic military training
- Presented by: the Department of the Navy; Department of the Air Force; Department of Homeland Security
- Eligibility: U.S. Air Force, Space Force, Coast Guard, and Navy basic training honor graduates
- Status: Active
- Established: 3 April 1976 - U.S. Air Force and Space Force; 3 March 1984 - U.S. Coast Guard; 18 August 2015 - U.S. Navy
- First award: 29 July 1976 - U.S. Air Force and Space Force; March 1984 - U.S. Coast Guard; 20 August 2015 - U.S. Navy

Precedence
- Next (higher): Air and Space Forces: USAF NCO PME Graduate Ribbon; Coast Guard: Coast Guard Overseas Service Ribbon; Navy: Navy Ceremonial Duty Ribbon
- Next (lower): Air and Space Forces: Small Arms Expert Marksmanship Ribbon; Coast Guard: Coast Guard Recruiting Service Ribbon; Navy: Armed Forces Reserve Medal

The Basic Training Honor Graduate Ribbon is the informal collective name for three equivalent United States military awards for the Navy, Air Force, Space Force, and Coast Guard recruits who graduate at the top of their basic training classes: The Air Force Basic Military Training Honor Graduate Ribbon, the Coast Guard Basic Training Honor Graduate Ribbon, and the Navy Recruit Honor Graduate Ribbon.

== U.S. Navy ==
The Navy Recruit Honor Graduate Ribbon was created on 18 August 2015, when U.S. Secretary of the Navy Ray Mabus released a statement authorizing the establishment of the Recruit Honor Graduate Ribbon. This ribbon is awarded to "initial accession enlisted personnel of the U.S. Navy who are designated as Honor Graduates." No more than three percent of each training group will be designated as honor graduates.

Fifteen recruits at Recruit Training Command (RTC), Naval Station Great Lakes, Illinois, were first awarded the ribbon on 20 August 2015. No retroactive awards will be made. In the Navy's military award order of precedence, the ribbon is worn after the Navy Ceremonial Guard Ribbon and before the Armed Forces Reserve Medal. Seaman Recruit Joseph Agbingpadua was the first recruit to receive the ribbon.

== U.S. Air Force and U.S. Space Force ==
The Basic Military Training Honor Graduate Ribbon was established on 3 April 1976 by order of the Air Force Chief of Staff, General David Charles Jones. The ribbon is awarded to graduates of Air Force and Space Force basic training who have obtained an honor graduate designation and demonstrate excellence in all areas of academic and military training.

An airman or guardian must achieve at least a 90% on their physical fitness level during the final AFBMT physical fitness test. The AFBMT physical fitness test has three parts: 1.5-mile run time (60%), number of sit ups in a minute (20%), and number of push ups in a minute (20%). If the trainee fails to reach a score of at least 90%, the airman or guardian is ineligible no matter how well they performed in other areas of basic training. Additionally, the airman or guardian must average over a 90 percent on all the written examinations, and never fail a graded inspection (graded inspections are conducted randomly after week #3). The airman or guardian must never receive a negative mark in a written evaluation. Current regulations limit the number of selectees to no more than ten percent of the graduating squadron.

The Basic Military Training Honor Graduate Ribbon is a one-time award and may not be presented retroactively. Those awarded are entitled to wear the Basic Training Honor Graduate Ribbon for the rest of their U.S. Air Force or U.S. Space Force careers.

== U.S. Coast Guard ==
The Coast Guard Basic Training Honor Graduate Ribbon was created on 3 March 1984, with the first presentation in April of that same year to Seaman apprentice Scott Woodard. The Basic Training Honor Graduate Ribbon is presented to the service member who graduates at the top of their basic training instruction class.

Retroactive presentations of the Basic Training Honor Graduate Ribbon may be awarded upon application from the service member to the United States Coast Guard. In such cases, the award will be presented for basic training graduation prior to 1984, only with supporting documentation and a written request from the service member.

As of 02-Feb-2025, there have been 2,400 Ribbons awarded.

== See also ==
- Army Service Ribbon
