= Enlisted Person of the Year Ribbon =

- Enlisted Person of the Year Ribbon
- Type: Ribbon
- Awarded for: "...the most outstanding active duty and Reserve enlisted person."
- Presented by: the U.S. Department of Homeland Security
- Eligibility: Active duty and reserve USCG personnel in paygrades E-2 through E-6
- Status: Current
- Established: February 16, 1999
- First award: 1999 (retroactive to 1994)

Precedence
- Next (higher): Coast Guard Reserve Good Conduct Medal
- Equivalent: Air Force: Outstanding Airman of the Year Ribbon

The Enlisted Person of the Year Ribbon is a decoration of the United States Coast Guard which was established in 1999, though retroactive to 1994, by order of the Commandant of the Coast Guard.

The Enlisted Person of the Year Ribbon is annually awarded to two members of the Coast Guard, paygrade E-2 through E-6; the Coast Guard Enlisted Person of the Year (EPOY) and the Coast Guard Reserve Enlisted Person of the Year (REPOY).

The selection is based on a display of pride, professionalism, and dedication to Coast Guard core values, and is made by a panel of Master Chief Petty Officers, led by the Master Chief Petty Officer of the Coast Guard (MCPOCG). The decoration is a one time only award and there are no devices authorized for multiple presentations.

The Coast Guard Reserve Enlisted Person of the Year was previously called the "NERA Outstanding Enlisted CG Reservist Award".

This award was based on the Outstanding Airman of the Year Ribbon, which is awarded by the United States Air Force. The United States Army, United States Navy, and United States Marine Corps have no award equivalent to the Enlisted Person of the Year Ribbon, although do maintain similar programs for yearly recognition of outstanding enlisted personnel.

== See also ==
Awards and decorations of the United States military
