= Navy Ceremonial Duty Ribbon =

- The Navy Ceremonial Duty Ribbon
- Type: Ribbon
- Presented by: the Department of the Navy
- Eligibility: Complete a standard tour of duty with the U.S. Navy Ceremonial Guard or on board USS Constitution.
- Status: Current
- Established: December 12, 2003 (as the "U.S. Navy Ceremonial Guard Ribbon"); January 17, 2012 (as the "Navy Ceremonial Duty Ribbon")
- First award: Retroactive to May 1, 2001

Precedence
- Next (higher): Navy Recruit Training Service Ribbon
- Equivalent: Navy Ceremonial Guard Ribbon (2003–2012)
- Next (lower): Navy Basic Military Training Honor Graduate Ribbon

The Navy Ceremonial Duty Ribbon, is an award of the United States Navy which was established on December 12, 2003 by order of Secretary of the Navy Gordon R. England for a successful tour of duty with the United States Navy Ceremonial Guard or USS Constitution ending on or after May 1, 2001. A Sailor's service prior to this date does not qualify the member for the ribbon.

== History ==
The ribbon was originally created in 2003 as the Navy Ceremonial Guard Ribbon to honor Sailors of that command, who form the Navy's Presidential honor guard and conduct all Navy funerals at Arlington National Cemetery. On January 17, 2012, the name of the ribbon was changed to the Navy Ceremonial Duty Ribbon so that Sailors serving aboard USS Constitution, who give tours of the ship, could also receive the ribbon.

== Eligibility ==
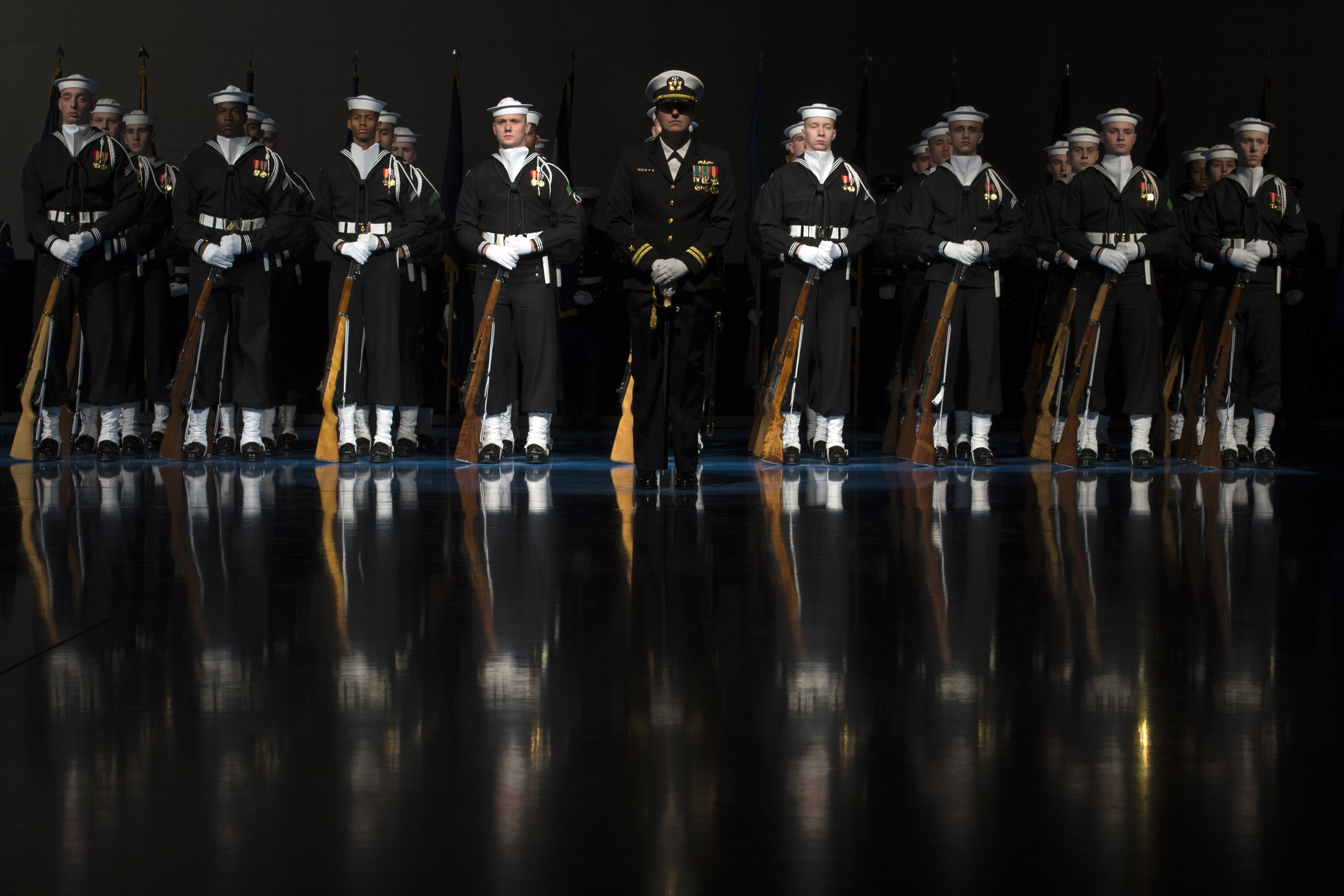
U.S. Navy Ceremonial Guard from the Naval District Washington, D.C. stand in formation for the Armed Forces Full Honor Farewell Review Ceremony in honor of the Secretary of Defense at Joint Base Myer-Henderson Hall in January 2017.

The Navy Ceremonial Duty Ribbon is presented to those members of the U.S. Navy who, while stationed in Washington, D.C., complete a standard tour of duty with the United States Navy Ceremonial Guard. A standard tour is defined as at least two years of duty with no disciplinary action, above average evaluations, and adherence to physical and military bearing standards of the Navy Ceremonial Guard. Sailors must also be in a drilling status for 18 months, and reach at least Standard Honors qualification within one of the Guard's four platoons (firing party, casket bearers, color guard, or drill team). It can also be presented to personnel who complete a successful tour aboard USS Constitution, defined in this case as a tour of 24 months, completion of all required qualifications, and maintaining outstanding personal appearance and a discipline free record.

The only awarding authorities for the Navy Ceremonial Duty Ribbon are the commanding officer of the United States Navy Ceremonial Guard, headquartered at Joint Base Anacostia-Bolling in the District of Columbia; and the commanding officer of USS Constitution, which is berthed at the Charlestown Navy Yard. Multiple awards of the Navy Ceremonial Duty Ribbon are denoted by 3/16" bronze service stars, however only one award of the ribbon is authorized for each tour of duty.

== See also ==
- Awards and decorations of the United States Armed Forces
