= Marine Corps Security Guard Ribbon =

- The U.S. Marine Corps Security Guard Ribbon
- Type: Ribbon bar
- Presented by: the Department of the Navy
- Eligibility: Thirty-six months of service as a Marine security guard at a U.S. embassy or consulate in a foreign country
- Status: Currently awarded
- Established: 15 July 1997; 29 years ago
- First award: 1997 (retroactive to 28 January 1949)

Precedence
- Next (higher): Marine Corps Drill Instructor Ribbon
- Next (lower): Marine Corps Combat Instructor Ribbon

The Marine Corps Security Guard Ribbon is a United States Marine Corps military award that was established by order of Secretary of the Navy John Howard Dalton on 15 July 1997. The award recognizes those Marine Corps personnel who have served as U.S. Embassy Security Guards and is retroactive to 28 January 1949.

Marines assigned to Marine Security Guard duty (MOS 8156) are eligible to receive the ribbon upon completion of 24 months of service at a foreign establishment. Subsequent awards will be made for every 24 months served, either consecutively or cumulatively. The MCSGR may be awarded retroactively to 28 January 1949, the date the first MSGs departed Washington, DC, for their overseas assignments. One award is authorized for the period 28 January 1949 to 15 August 1974, regardless of the number of qualifying periods. In addition, the following personnel are eligible to receive the MCSGR: (a) Training Personnel: Director of Marine Security Guard (MSG) School/Battalion Commander; Officer in Charge (OIC) of MSG School; Operations Officer MSGBN; Assistant OPS Officer MSGBN; and SGTMAJ of MSGBN. (b) Command Personnel: Lettered Company Commander/Executive Officer (X0)/0perations (OPS) Inspecting Officers/First Sergeant (1STSGT) and MSGBN XO. (2) Period of Service (a) Marines assigned to Marine Security Guard duty (MOS 8151) are eligible to receive the ribbon upon completion of 24 months of service at a foreign establishment. Subsequent awards will be made for every 24 months served, eitherE consecutively or cumulatively.SECNAVINST 1650.1H

Except as stated in (a) and (b) above, service at a lettered MSGBN company headquarters or at HQ MSGBN, Quantico does not qualify a Marine for this award.

On a case-by-case basis, the MCSGR may be awarded posthumously without regard to period of service.

Personnel transferred early for the Good of the Service must have served a minimum of 12 months in the program to be eligible for this award. Personnel transferred due to Relief for Cause are not eligible for the ribbon.

== History ==
To be awarded the Marine Corps Security Guard Ribbon, a service member must hold the Marine Corps military occupational specialty (MOS) 8156 (previously 8151) Marine Corps Security Guard and must have served thirty-six months of service at an American embassy or consulate. The award is only awarded to Marine Security Guards for their service at American Embassies or Consulates in a foreign country.
