= Iraq Commitment Medal =

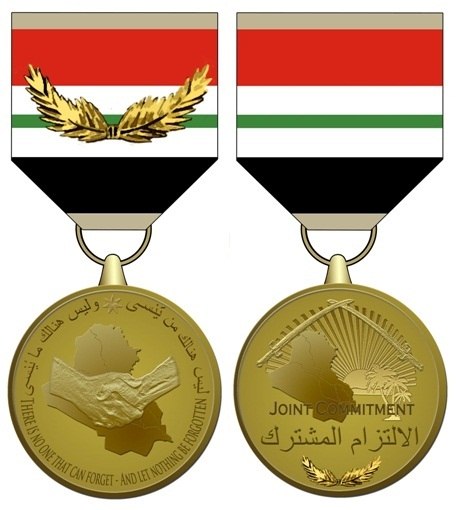
- Iraq Commitment Medal, obverse (left), and reverse (right).
- Type: Campaign medal
- Presented by: Federal government of Iraq
- Status: Pending approval (9 April 2021)
- First award: December 1, 2011

Highlights
- Total: 1
- Total awarded posthumously: Yes
- Total recipients: President Joe Biden (original version), a relevant number of veterans worldwide (modified version)
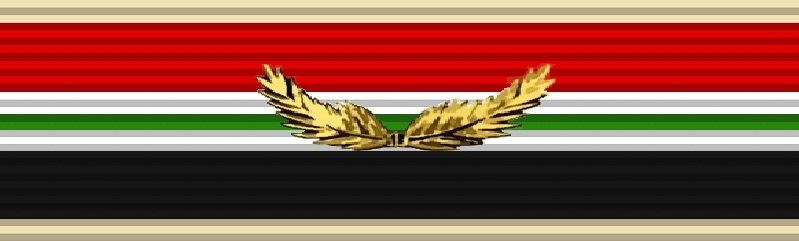
- Proposed ribbon for the Iraq Commitment Medal

Precedence
- Individual equivalent: Yes
- Related: Iraq Campaign Medal

The Iraq Commitment Medal (Arabic: نوط الالتزام المشترك) is a military campaign award that was created on June 11, 2011, by the Government of Iraq. The medal was offered to United States and Coalition veterans of the Iraq War in a letter to the United States Secretary of Defense. The award has not been officially approved for acceptance or wear by the United States or other coalition partner governments, being still in the "Pending Approval" status. In 2013, the Department of Defense made a statement that it is still waiting for the initial group of medals to be received from the Government of Iraq. This award was presented to then-Vice President Joe Biden on December 1, 2011.

== History ==
In 2011, as preparations were being made to draw down U.S. forces in Iraq, Iraqi Minister of Defense Saadoun al-Dulaimi offered the award of a new medal the Government of Iraq Commitment Medal to former and current foreign military personnel who had served in Iraq from March 19, 2003, to December 31, 2011. This award was to recognize, "...the long years during which we have been mutually committed to the effort to achieve peace and prosperity for the people of Iraq." The letter offering award of the medal empowered the military authorities of the United States and other coalition partners to award the medal on behalf of the Iraqi government. A single Commitment Medal was produced by Iraq and presented to then Vice President Joe Biden on December 1, 2011, at a ceremony marking the end of Operation New Dawn and the withdrawal of U.S. troops from Iraq.

== Criteria ==
The award criteria, spelled out in the offer of the medal from Defense Minister al-Dulaimi, are that service members must have served for 30 consecutive days or for 60 non-consecutive days within the borders of Iraq, within its territorial waters, or within its airspace during the period of March 19, 2003, to December 31, 2011. Pilots and aircrew members who flew missions within Iraqi airspace will be credited for one day for each day of air operations. Service members who engaged in combat during an armed engagement or were wounded or injured in the line of duty to a degree which required medical evacuation from Iraq qualify for the medal without regard to the number of days of service.

== Appearance ==
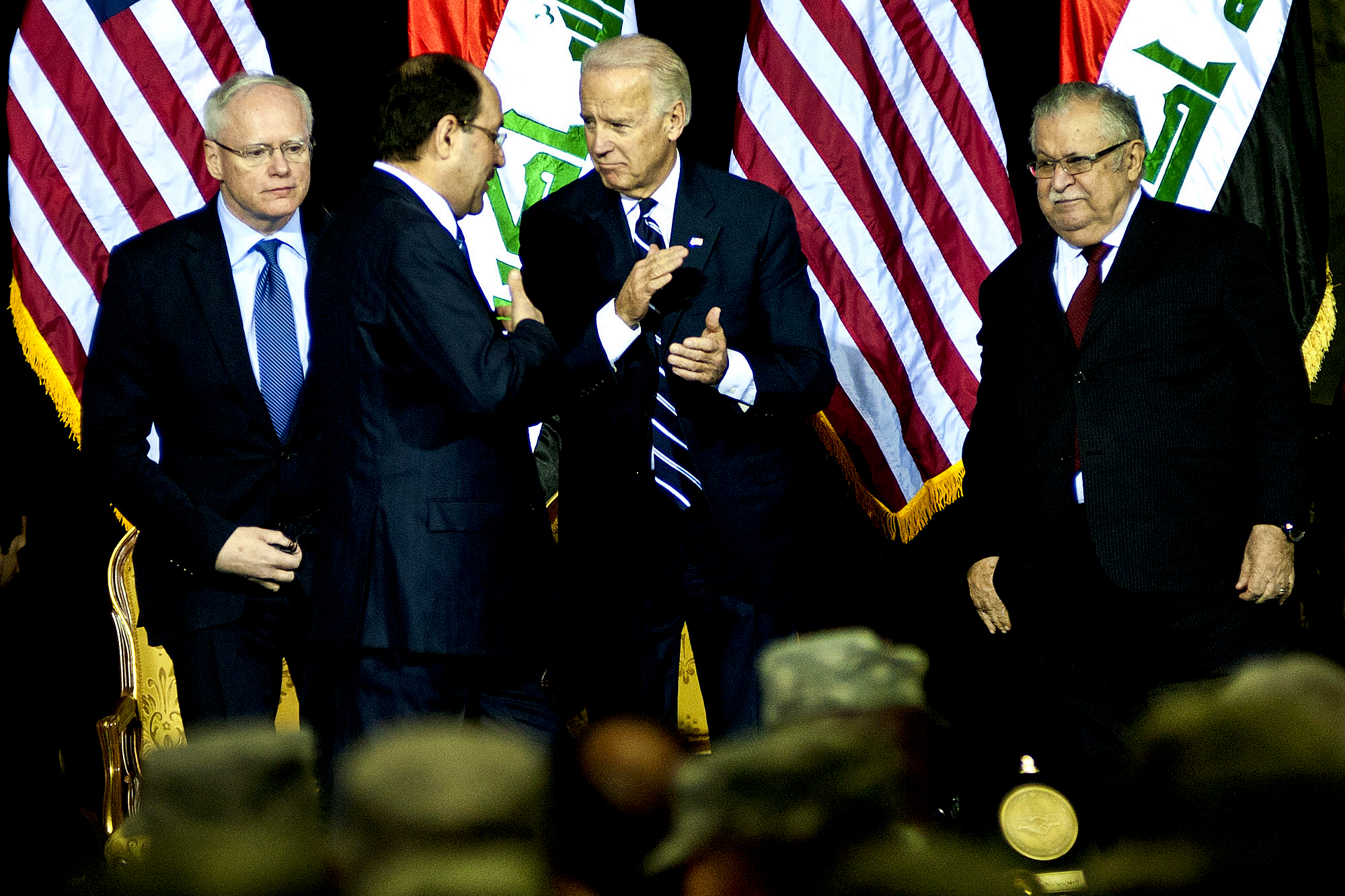
Vice President is awarded the new medal on the Iraqi government's Day of Commitment in 2011.

The Commitment Medal is a gold-colored medal with enamel, 1 9/16 in diameter. On the front the relief of Iraq represents the area of operation. The lines symbolize the Tigris and Euphrates Rivers, recalling Iraq's title as “the land of two rivers.” The two hands superimposed over the relief symbolize the friendship between Iraq and her coalition allies. The star at the center top represents a vision of unity for the seven peoples of Iraq (Sunni, Shia, Kurd, Turkoman, Assyrian, Yazidi, Armenian) leading to a more secure, prosperous and free future for Iraqis. The inscription in both Arabic and English merge into a continuous circle symbolizing the closeness of Iraq and her allies.

On the reverse side the rayed disc symbolizes the sun, optimism and Iraq's future of reconstruction and the establishment of the democratic way of life. The relief of Iraq represents the area of operation. The lines symbolize the Tigris and Euphrates Rivers, recalling Iraq's title as “the land of two rivers.” The crossed scimitars recall the partnership between Coalition Forces and Iraqi Security Forces essential to bringing a democratic way of life to Iraq. Gold is emblematic of honor and high achievement. It states JOINT COMMITMENT in both Arabic and English symbolizing the unity of effort between Iraq and her Coalition Partners. The palm trees along with the palm fronds on the front represent the sacrifices made by the Coalition Partners.

The ribbon is 1 3/8 inches in width; however it is mounted on the ribbon bar horizontally so that the horizontal top stripe is a 1/16 Chamois (67142) stripe with a 3/64 inch Scarlett (67111) stripe underneath it. A 1/16 inch White (67101) stripe on each side of a 1/16 Green (67129) follows. Below the bottom white stripe is a 3/64 Black (67138) stripe with a 1/16 Chamois (67142) stripe serving as the bottom stripe. A device of palm fronds representing the sacrifices of coalition forces, both Iraqi and Allied, is centered on the ribbon.

The colors represent the following. The Green is the traditional color for Islam. Red honors the fighting courage for the pursuit of freedom. White denotes generosity and black exemplifies Islam's success. The tan represents the sands of Mesopotamia.

== Acceptance and wear ==
In 2013, the Department of Defense made a statement that it is still waiting for the initial group of medals to be received from the Government of Iraq. In the past, when a foreign government desires to award a medal, they offer to provide the medal to the recipients' government. The government then makes a determination about acceptance and wear of the medal. The United States Department of Defense takes the position that since there are no medals forthcoming from the government of Iraq, there is no decision to make about acceptance or wear. The Department of Defense will not approve foreign campaign or expeditionary service medals for acceptance and wear by military personnel unless the medal is fully funded and provided by the awarding foreign government. Different rules apply to other countries governments, since they have their own laws and regulations regarding the foreign awards and decorations; so a non-US holder has to comply with his country's rules to have this medal accepted. There have been at least two efforts to manufacture, and offer for sale, a modified version of the medal for eligible veterans to purchase on their own. This also created a legal loophole, since in some ways the modified version can be considered a "commemorative medal", so falling under a different legal set also in the United States. One effort was attempting a crowdfunding solution through a Kickstarter campaign in late 2019. This campaign resulted in a version being sold by an American medals manufacturer. A petition to White House's We the People petition website in early 2020 did not meet the 100,000 signatures in 30 days that the program requires for petitions to be reviewed.
