= Marine Corps Combat Instructor Ribbon =

- Marine Corps Combat Instructor Ribbon
- Type: Special duty assignment ribbon
- Awarded for: Successful completion of a tour at the School of Infantry East or West
- Country: United States
- Presented by: the Department of the Navy
- Eligibility: Combat instructors or those serving in a high-profile leadership role
- Established: 20 August 2014; 12 years ago
- First award: September 2014 (retroactive to 9 October 2002)

Precedence
- Next (higher): Marine Corps Security Guard Ribbon
- Next (lower): Armed Forces Reserve Medal

The Marine Corps Combat Instructor Ribbon is a military award of the United States Marine Corps established by Secretary of the Navy Ray Mabus in August 2014. The ribbon recognizes the successful completion of a tour as a combat instructor, or in a high-profile leadership position, at the School of Infantry East or West.

== Appearance ==
The ribbon is chamois in color with edges of olive green, with the center being a stripe of black. Subsequent awards of the ribbon are denoted by bronze service stars, with a silver 3/16 inch star worn to denote a sixth award.
