= Navy Civilian Service Achievement Medal =

U.S. Navy civilian medal

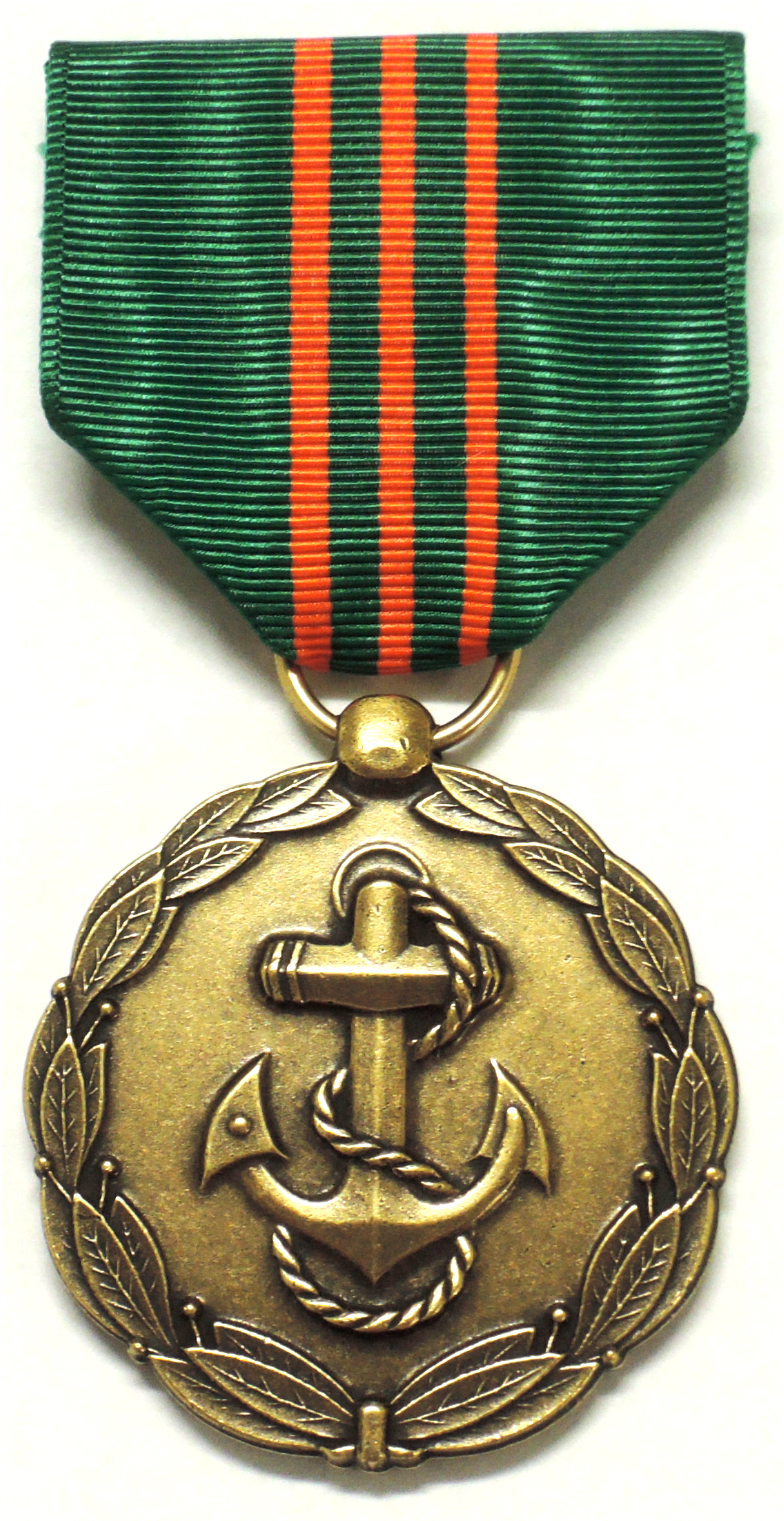
- Navy Civilian Service Achievement Medal
- Country: United States
- Presented by: Department of the Navy
- Eligibility: Civilian employees of the Department of the Navy and the Marine Corps
- Status: Active
- Established: April 24, 2018
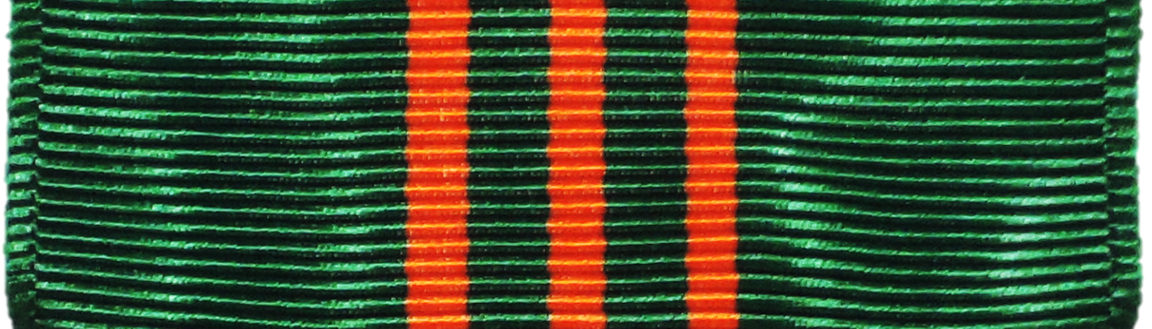
- Ribbon bar of the medal

Precedence
- Next (higher): Navy Civilian Service Commendation Medal
- Next (lower): Navy Certificate of Achievement

The Navy Civilian Service Achievement Medal is awarded to Department of the Navy and U.S. Marine Corps civilians who, while serving in a capacity within the Navy or Marine Corps, are to be recognized for sustained performance or specific achievement of a superlative nature at the equivalent level of the Navy and Marine Corps Achievement Medal awarded to military personnel.

The award consists of a certificate and citation signed by the activity head, the medal on a suspension ribbon, and a lapel emblem. The award is the fifth highest Navy civilian award, ranking just behind the Navy Civilian Service Commendation Medal, and before the Navy Certificate of Achievement. The approval authority for the award is commanders in the rank of O-5 and above and civilians in equivalent positions and above. The first known presentations were to Bilyana Atova Reece, Sara Givens, and Kaitlyn Owens in Europe on Jan. 16, 2019.

== Medal and ribbon description ==
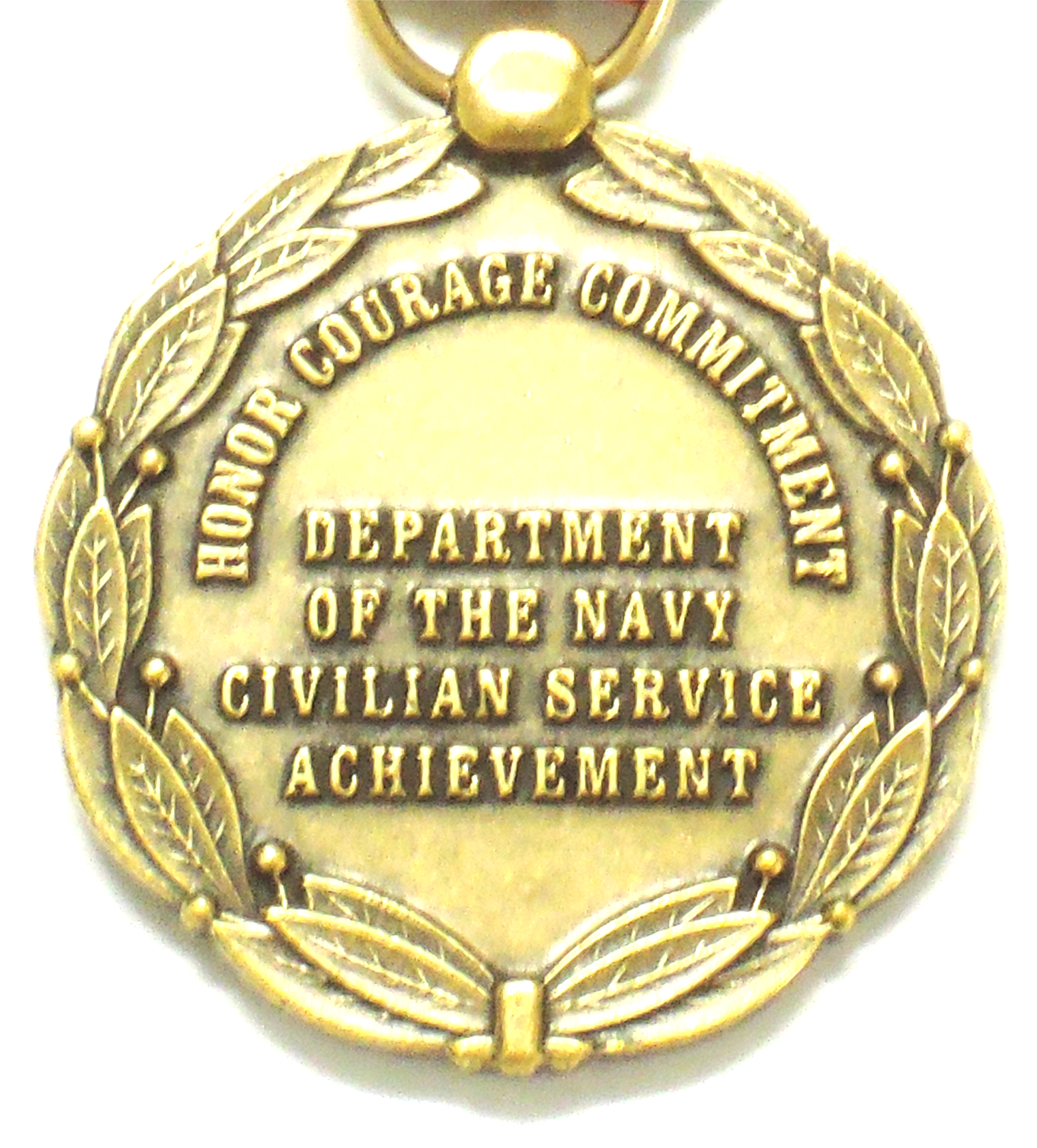
Reverse side of the medal

The medal's overall shape is that of a bronze circle, but laurel leaves extend slightly from the sides of both the obverse and revers. In the center of the bronze laurel wreath on the obverse is a fouled anchor. This anchor is adapted from the United States Navy and Marine Corps Achievement Medal. This is to denote the award as being presented on behalf of the Navy or Marine Corps, and to parallel the equivalent award for military service members. The laurel wreaths is emblematic of achievement and honor.

Within the laurel wreath border on the reverse, arched across the top, are the words "Honor Courage Commitment." In the lower center is the stacked inscription "Department of the Navy Civilian Service Achievement"

The colors of the ribbon are myrtle green with three orange stripes. These colors are consistent with the equivalent award for military service members (the Navy and Marine Corps Achievement Medal).

== Award recipients ==
- Sara Givens, Naval Support Activity Naples, Italy, Jan. 16, 2019
- Kaitlyn Owens, Naval Support Activity Naples, Italy, Jan. 16, 2019
- Randee Artis, OPNAV N1, Arlington, VA, May 17, 2019
- David W. Brown, NAVFAC SW, NAS Lemoore CA, February 2020
- Ruben R. Luevano, Naval Air Weapons Station, China Lake, February 2020
- Rebecca C. Sechrist, Submarine Learning Center, HQ, Groton, CT, May 10, 2020
- James H. Besser II, Naval Information Warfare Systems Command, July 6, 2020
- Randee Artis, OPNAV N1, Arlington, VA, December 7, 2020
- Sean Harold, NAVSUP Fleet Logistics Center, Sigonella, Italy, January 20, 2021
- Adele Boese, Marine Corps Cyber Operations Group, Quantico VA, January 15, 2021
- Thomas F. Wall, Ph.D., Commander, Submarine Squadron FIFTEEN, Guam, February 19, 2021
- Jonathan M. Keech, SRF-JRMC Yokosuka, Japan, March 2021
- Patrick Kill, NAVSUP Fleet Logistics Center, Sigonella, Italy, May 21, 2021
- David R. Hutchinson, Marine Corps Installations Pacific, South Korea, May 21, 2021
- Joseph A. Van Gorp, NAVSUP Fleet Logistics Center, Sigonella, Italy. June 21, 2021
- Christopher K. Tate, SUPSHIP Gulf Coast (SSGC), Pascagoula MS, August 9, 2021
- Richard Fourcher, Norfolk Naval shipyard (NNSY) Portsmouth VA, August 24, 2021
- Bryan Ainsworth, Norfolk Naval shipyard (NNSY) Portsmouth VA, August 24, 2021
- Gerald Allen, Norfolk Naval shipyard (NNSY) Portsmouth VA, August 24, 2021
- Daryl Clements, Norfolk Naval shipyard (NNSY) Portsmouth VA, August 24, 2021
- David Jester, Norfolk Naval shipyard (NNSY) Portsmouth VA, August 24, 2021
- Michael Tate, Norfolk Naval shipyard (NNSY) Portsmouth VA, August 24, 2021
- Rebecca Maddox, Naval Facilities Engineering and Expeditionary Warfare Center (NAVFAC EXWC), NBVC Port Hueneme, CA, December 15, 2021
- Terry L. Sparks, Naval Air Station Whidbey Island, 2022
- Julie A. Pratt, Naval Surface Warfare Center, NSWCDD, December 2022
- Morgan Lueck, 2D FSB, Marine Corps Logistics Command, MCLB Albany GA, January 10, 2022
- Dené Braswell, SCMC, Marine Corps Logistics Command, MCLB Albany GA, 2022
- Wendy Johnson, SCMC, Marine Corps Logistics Command, MCLB Albany GA, 2022
- Michele Harris, SCMC, Marine Corps Logistics Command, MCLB Albany GA, 2022
- Sara Truver Johnson, SCMC, Marine Corps Logistics Command, MCLB Albany GA, 2022
- Essic Stroman, SCMC, Marine Corps Logistics Command, MCLB Albany GA, 2022
- Daniel R. Erdmann, SCMC, Marine Corps Logistics Command, MCLB Albany GA, 2022
- Jason M. Griffith, NAVFAC PWD, NAVFAC SE, NAS Jacksonville, FL. 2022
- Megan McKimson, Unaccompanied Housing N932, NAVBASE Kitsap WA, February 25, 2022
- Paul E. Jone, Jr., CNATTU Jacksonville, FL April 2022
- Lee K. Pennington, Ph.D., United States Naval Academy (USNA), Annapolis, MD; April 26, 2022
- Laura P. Bryant, Ph.D. Naval Education and Training Professional Development Center, Pensacola, FL. April 28, 2022
- Noah Veth, NAVFAC NW, Bangor WA, June 16, 2022
- Tatiana A. Vayner, Commander, NAVY Region Northwest, Bangor WA, August 19, 2022
- Pamela R. Smith, Naval Support Activity Millington, TN, August 22, 2022
- William Y. Lee, Naval Facilities Engineering Systems Command, (NAVFAC) Southwest, Monterey, CA. June 28, 2022
- Roy R. Carius, Naval Facilities Engineering Systems Command, (NAVFAC) Southwest, Monterey, CA. June 28, 2022
- Leon J. Martinelli, Naval Facilities Engineering Systems Command, (NAVFAC) Southwest, Monterey, CA. June 28, 2022
- Sam Faavesi, Naval Facilities Engineering Systems Command, (NAVFAC) Southwest, Monterey, CA. June 28, 2022
- Sarah Jane F. McLaughlin, MCIPAC-MCB Contracting Office, Okinawa, Japan. September 27, 2022
- Hunter R. Belcher, Naval Base Point Loma, San Diego, CA. September 30, 2022
- Hailey D. Chittick, Navy Gold Star Program, Naval Station Everett, Everett, WA. October 9, 2022
- Sean Harold, NAVSUP Fleet Logistics Center, Sigonella, Italy, November 28, 2022
- Brett Smith, Navy Region Mid-Atlantic Fire & Emergency Services (CNIC) NAS Oceana, VA. December 6, 2022
- Richard V. Hobson, Naval Base Point Loma (CNRSW), San Diego, CA. December 15, 2022
- Michael Daley, Naval Base Point Loma (CNRSW), San Diego, CA. December 15, 2022
- Richard Torres, Naval Base Point Loma (CNRSW), San Diego, CA. December 15, 2022
- Aubrey H. Lozano, Naval Base Point Loma (CNRSW), San Diego, CA. December 15, 2022
- Michael C. Walrond, Submarine Learning Center, Groton, CT. January 9, 2022
- James R. Gregg, Naval Submarine School, Groton, CT. January 19, 2022
- Corinne M. Miller, Naval Submarine School, Groton, CT. January 19, 2022 & February 9,
- Ginger E. Cross, NAVFAC SE, Public Works Department, Naval Air Station Jacksonville, 2023
- Jill E. Ray, Puget Sound Naval Shipyard (PSNS), Bremerton WA. February 22, 2023
- Troy Alexander Coberly, NROTC Maryland Consortium, Catonsville, MD. February 22, 2023
- Eric T. Ross, Puget Sound Naval Shipyard (PSNS), Bremerton, WA. March 27, 2023
- Ean A. Ravelo, Navy Region Hawaii (CNRH), Pearl Harbor, HI. April 6, 2023
- Joshua C. Stout, Navy Region Hawaii (CNRH), Pearl Harbor, HI. April 10, 2023
- Steven Kyle Denton, Puget Sound Naval Shipyard (PSNS), Bremerton, WA, May 3, 2023
- Dakota S. King, Puget Sound Naval Shipyard (PSNS), Bremerton, WA. May 3, 2023
- Kyle R. Barone, Puget Sound Naval Shipyard (PSNS), Bremerton, WA. May 3, 2023
- Bret M. Brown, Puget Sound Naval Shipyard (PSNS), Bremerton, WA. May 3, 2023
- Joseph J. Doyle, Puget Sound Naval Shipyard (PSNS), Bremerton, WA. May 3, 2023
- Allie M. Grega, Puget Sound Naval Shipyard (PSNS), Bremerton, WA. May 4, 2023
- Michael C. Landin, Puget Sound Naval Shipyard (PSNS), Bremerton, WA. May 4, 2023
- Tammy R. Savidge, Puget Sound Naval Shipyard (PSNS), Bremerton, WA. May 2023
- Lee A. Parker, NIWC PAC, San Diego, CA May 2023
- Rick Brown, NIWC PAC, San Diego, CA May 2023
- Alex Zimmer, NIWC PAC, San Diego, CA May 2023
- Karen Loomis, Naval Support Activity Bethesda (NSAB), Bethesda, MD. June 8, 2023
- Austin Soares, NAVSEA HQ, Washington, DC. June 22, 2023
- Ryan Garvin, Norfolk NSY, Norfolk, VA. June 22, 2023
- Clint Hastings, Naval Information Warfare Center (NIWC) Pacific, San Diego, CA. June 27, 2023
- Kathleen M. Davis, Naval Health Clinic, MCAS Cherry Point, NC. July 15, 2023
- Rachel Jimenez, NIWC PAC, San Diego, CA July 2023
- Jerred Fullerton, NIWC Pacific, San Diego, CA July 2023
- Gabrielle Bricker, Naval Supply Systems Command, Weapon Systems Support, Mechanicsburg, PA July 26, 2023
- Darryn DeShong, Naval Supply Systems Command, Weapon Systems Support, Mechanicsburg, PA July 26, 2023
- Hannah Forsyth, Naval Supply Systems Command, Weapon Systems Support, Mechanicsburg, PA July 26, 2023
- Morgan Van Hemert, Naval Supply Systems Command, Weapon Systems Support, Mechanicsburg, PA July 26, 2023
- Heather Utsick, Naval Supply Systems Command, Weapon Systems Support, Mechanicsburg, PA July 26, 2023
- Joseph DiBella, NAWCTSD Orlando, FL August 9, 2023
- Matthew McNealy, NAWCTSD Orlando, FL August 9, 2023
- Matthew R Mather, Navy Region Southwest Fire & Emergency Services, Federal Fire Department San Diego (CNIC) San Diego, CA. August 23, 2023
- Jake O. Lacerna, NIWC Pacific, San Diego, CA August 2023
- Michele A. Ramirez, NIWC Pacific, San Diego, CA August 2023
- Larissa "Lara" J. Bissonnette, NIWC Pacific, San Diego, CA August 2023
- Bill Caudle, Naval Information Warfare Center (NIWC) Pacific, San Diego, CA August 2023
- Charles N. Steffel, NIWC Pacific, San Diego, CA August 2023
- Malenereynee Carr, U.S. Consulate Rio de Janeiro, August 2023
- Andrew M. Sida, NIWC Pacific, San Diego, CA August 2023
- James P. Breedlove, MARFORCYBER Ft Meade, MD Aug 2023
- Jackie H. McClure, NSWC Dahlgren Dam Neck Activity, Virginia Beach, VA September 2023
- Christopher A. Boucher R.A., PWD Portsmouth FEAD, NNSY, Portsmouth, VA September 2023
- John E. Mitchell, NHC Charleston, Charleston, SC September 2023
- John W. Kampe II, Naval Sea Systems Command, Washington, D.C. September 6, 2023
- Jordan A. Allred, NAVWAR HQ, Washington D.C. August 8, 2023
- Jordan A. Allred, NAVWAR HQ, San Diego, CA April 1, 2026
- Adam D Peaslee, Puget Sound Naval Shipyard (PSNS), Bremerton, WA November 2023
- Anthony Blackner, Puget Sound Naval Shipyard (PSNS), Bremerton, WA November 2023
- Jonathan T Collins, NAVAIR NAWCAD, Patuxent River, MD December 2023
- Pamela G Hughes, Puget Sound Naval Shipyard (PSNS), Bremerton, WA December 2023
- Robert N. Kovach, Naval Supply Systems Command Ammunition Logistics Center, PA October 2023
- Jon P. Belby, FRC Mid-Atlantic, Virginia Beach, VA December 2023
- Craig M. Smith, NIWC Pacific, San Diego, CA February 2024
- Nicholas B. Dong, CNIC MWR, Patuxent River, MD March 28, 2024
- Russell Meadows, Naval Surface Warfare Center, Crane Division (NSWC Crane), Crane, IN April 2024
- Amy J. Platz, NAVCONBRIG Charleston, SC, May 2024
- Calvin E. Dephouse, NAVCONBRIG Charleston, SC, May 2024
- Cyrus T. Johnson, NAVCONBRIG Charleston, SC, May 2024
- Jacob D. Sylvia, Naval Sea Systems Command, Washington, DC, May 15, 2024
- Keith R. Piccirello, NSA Souda Bay, Greece, June 18, 2024
- Riley J. O'Rourke, Naval Air Weapons Center Weapons Division, China Lake, CA, June 25, 2024
- David M. Randolph, Naval Weapons Station, Seal Beach, CA, June 28, 2024
- Noell A. Bolleurs, Naval Weapons Station, Seal Beach, CA, June 28, 2024
- Shawn T. Tinsley, Portsmouth Naval Shipyard Police Department, Kittery ME, July 8, 2024
- Jonathan R. Champlin, Portsmouth Naval Shipyard Police Department, Kittery ME, July 8, 2024
- Cynthia L. Catalan-Rodriguez, USN JAG Corps, RLSO SE, DET Mayport, Florida, July 12, 2024
- Mark D. Raker, Naval Facilities Engineering Systems Command Mid-Atlantic. 16 July 2024
- Vernon A. Bonney, Naval Facilities Engineering Systems Command Mid-Atlantic. 17 July 2024
- Clay D. Starner, MARFORCYBER Ft. Meade, MD June 19, 2024
- Lucas W. Twilley, NAVFAC EURAFCENT, Naples, Italy, June 4, 2024
- Jose A. Becerra, Naval Construction Training Center, Port Hueneme, CA, September 18, 2024
- Adam R. Bier, Naval Base Point Loma (CNRSW), San Diego, CA. October 8, 2024
- Vu T. Cao, Naval Surface Warfare Center Panama City Division, Panama City FL, October 25, 2024
- Kristofer J. Wall, Trident Refit Facility BANGOR (TRFB), Silverdale, WA, October 29, 2024
- James F. Davis, Naval Support Activity Mid-South, Millington, TN, November 22, 2024
- Alexander S. Craft, Naval Supply Systems Command, Weapon Systems Support, Mechanicsburg PA, November 26, 2024
- Lora Foltz, Naval Supply Systems Command, Weapon Systems Support, Mechanicsburg PA, November 26, 2024
- Jennifer Morrison, Naval Supply Systems Command, Weapon Systems Support, Mechanicsburg PA, November 26, 2024
- Petter Prime, Naval Supply Systems Command, Weapon Systems Support, Mechanicsburg PA, November 26, 2024
- Adam J. Forshey, NAVFAC EURAFCENT, Naples, Italy, December 9, 2024
- Amanda M. Yeager, Naval Information Warfare Center Atlantic, December 10, 2024
- Irine N. Chenwi, Naval Undersea Warfare Center, Newport, RI, December 17, 2024
- Stephen "Steve" H. Price, NAVWAR HQ, San Diego, CA, January 2, 2025
- Jessica Vermillion, U.S. Naval Research Laboratory, Washington DC, January 13, 2025
- Jessica K. Eddy, NAVSEA HQ, Washington DC, January 17, 2025
- Tracey Cheek, Naval Surface Warfare Center, Carderock Division, Bethesda, MD, February 26, 2025
- Kevin M. Sullivan, Naval Base San Diego, San Diego, CA, February 27, 2025
- Andrew C. Tandoi, Naval Surface Warfare Center Philadelphia Division, Philadelphia, PA, March 11, 2025
- Stephen M. Geels, Naval Information Warfare Center Atlantic, Norfolk, VA, March 27, 2025
- Charles H. Webb, Naval Support Activity Hampton Roads, Norfolk VA, March 28, 2025
- Shaquira Duncan, Fleet Readiness Center Southeast, Jacksonville, FL, April 11, 2025
- Kristen L. Davis, Regional Support Center New London, Groton, CT, April 15, 2025
- John Kevin A. Abad, Naval Information Warefare Center Pacific, San Diego, CA, April 16, 2025
- Timothy Simons, Naval Air Station Whidbey Island, May 5, 2025
- Katie Connellan-McClaren, Naval Base Coronado, Coronado, CA, May 6, 2025
- Teresa Mendoza, Naval Base Coronado, Coronado, CA, May 6, 2025
- Christine B. Vonk, Naval Research Laboratory, Washington, DC, May 6, 2025
- Andrew K. Bartow, Naval Information Warfare Center - Atlantic, Charleston, SC, May 9, 2025
- Darin A. Carroll, Naval Information Warfare Center - Atlantic, Charleston, SC, May 9, 2025
- Jack A. Molthen, USNS Cesar Chavez (T-AKE 14) - Duqm, Oman May 25, 2025
- Margaret H. MacBlane, USNS Cesar Chavez (T-AKE 14) - Duqm, Oman May 25, 2025
- Tyler D. Rehwoldt, Naval Information Warfare Center - Atlantic, Charleston, SC, May 26, 2025
- Peter Cranton, Naval Medical Readiness Training Unit (NMRTU) China Lake, CA, June 13 2025
- Kizer O. Braxton, Naval Information Warfare Center - Atlantic, Charleston, SC, June 26, 2025
- David B. Mendelsohn, Naval Information Warfare Center - Atlantic, Charleston, SC, June 26, 2025
- Brian D. Derby, NAVFAC EURAFCENT, Naples, Italy, June 27, 2025
- Michael C. Schmidt, Naval Information Warfare Center (NIWC) Pacific, San Diego, CA. June 30, 2025
- Wayne J. Taglieri, USNS Laramie (T-AO 203), Limassol, Cyprus, July 2, 2025
- Mario E. Rojas, USNS Laramie (T-AO 203), Limassol, Cyprus, July 2, 2025
- Brenden S. Hernley, Cherry Point K9, MCAS Cherry Point, NC. August 6, 2025
- Bryan R. Swan, Naval Air Warfare Center Training Systems Division (NAWCTSD) Orlando, FL, August 13, 2025

04 2025

- Scott T. Maratta, Naval Air Systems Command (NAVAIR), NAS Patuxent River, August 21, 2025
- Theodore Cheung, Accounting Officer, Marine Corps Base Hawaii, September 2025
- Joey Gauthier, Naval Supply Systems Command, Weapon Systems Support, Philadelphia, PA, September 17, 2025
- Christopher J. Seyler, Naval Information Warfare Command Atlantic (NIWCLANT) Charleston, SC, December
- Jean E. Peterson, Navy Medical Readiness & Training Command New England, Newport, RI. December 5, 2025
- Philip F. Hettel, MCAS Yuma, Air Traffic Control Maintenance Division. Yuma,AZ. December 9 2025
- Dr. Barbara Townes Mayers, Family Care Branch, Okinawa, Japan, January 22, 2026
- Jefferson Murray, Center For Navy Aviation Technical Training, Det Tinker AFB, OK, January 23, 2026
- Adam Henckler, Portsmouth Naval Shipyard (PNS), Kittery, ME, January 26, 2026
- Alana Schaeffer, Portsmouth Naval Shipyard (PNS), Kittery, ME, January 26, 2026
- Ashley Legere, Portsmouth Naval Shipyard (PNS), Kittery, ME, January 26, 2026
- Kim Aucella, Portsmouth Naval Shipyard (PNS), Kittery, ME, January 26, 2026
- Ann Steffiare, Portsmouth Naval Shipyard (PNS), Kittery, ME, January 26, 2026
- Umair Masood, Naval Support Activity Bahrain, Comptroller (N8), January 28, 2026
- Jonathan Dayton, Naval Air System Command (NAVAIR), NAS Patuxent River, MD, February 19, 2026
- Salvatore Piu, Naval Air System Command (NAVAIR), NAS Patuxent River, MD, February 19, 2026
- Nicholas Wondoloski, Naval Air System Command (NAVAIR), NAS Patuxent River, MD, February 19, 2026
- Michael A. Hagan, Naval Information Warfare Center - Atlantic, New Orleans, LA, April 10, 2026
- Dr. Ashley E. Wadsworth, Surface Combat Systems Training Command, Naval Station Great Lakes, Great Lakes, IL, May 21, 2026
- Pierce J. Bellaire, SRF-JRMC Yokosuka, Japan, June 25th, 2026
- Joshua P. Davenport, 22nd Marine Expeditionary Unit (SOC), July 7, 2026
- Jessica Hopkins, USS IWO JIMA (LHD 7), Norfolk, VA, July 7, 2026
- Cody Smith, NSWC PCD, September 1, 2026
- Stephen Weathers, NSWC PCD, September 1, 2026
- Kelly Howard, NSWC PCD, September 1, 2026
- Jackson Clark, ONI, Washington, DC, September 24, 2026
- Michael Kohn, PMA-265, Patuxent River Md, May 12, 2026

== History ==
In 2017, the Civilian Advisory Board for the commander, U.S. Naval Forces Europe-Africa (CNE-A) identified a lack of honorary awards for civilian Department of the Navy (DoN) employees. DoN civilians were eligible for the fewest number of medals and civilian service awards compared to civilians working for the Department of Army and Department of the Air Force. By excluding achievements of a more narrow scope or impact, a majority of the workforce was omitted from receiving recognition for their contributions until they are well advanced in their careers, if at all.

In July 2017, CNE-A signed the proposal to the Secretary of the Navy (SECNAV) requesting for the addition of the two newly-designed civilian honorary medals. Then in September 2017, the proposal for the awards was presented to the DoN Executive Management Awards Panel and was immediately endorsed and forwarded to SECNAV for approval.

April 24, 2018, SECNAV approved the awards without any significant changes from the original proposed design.
