= Distinguished Warfare Medal =

Planned United States military decoration

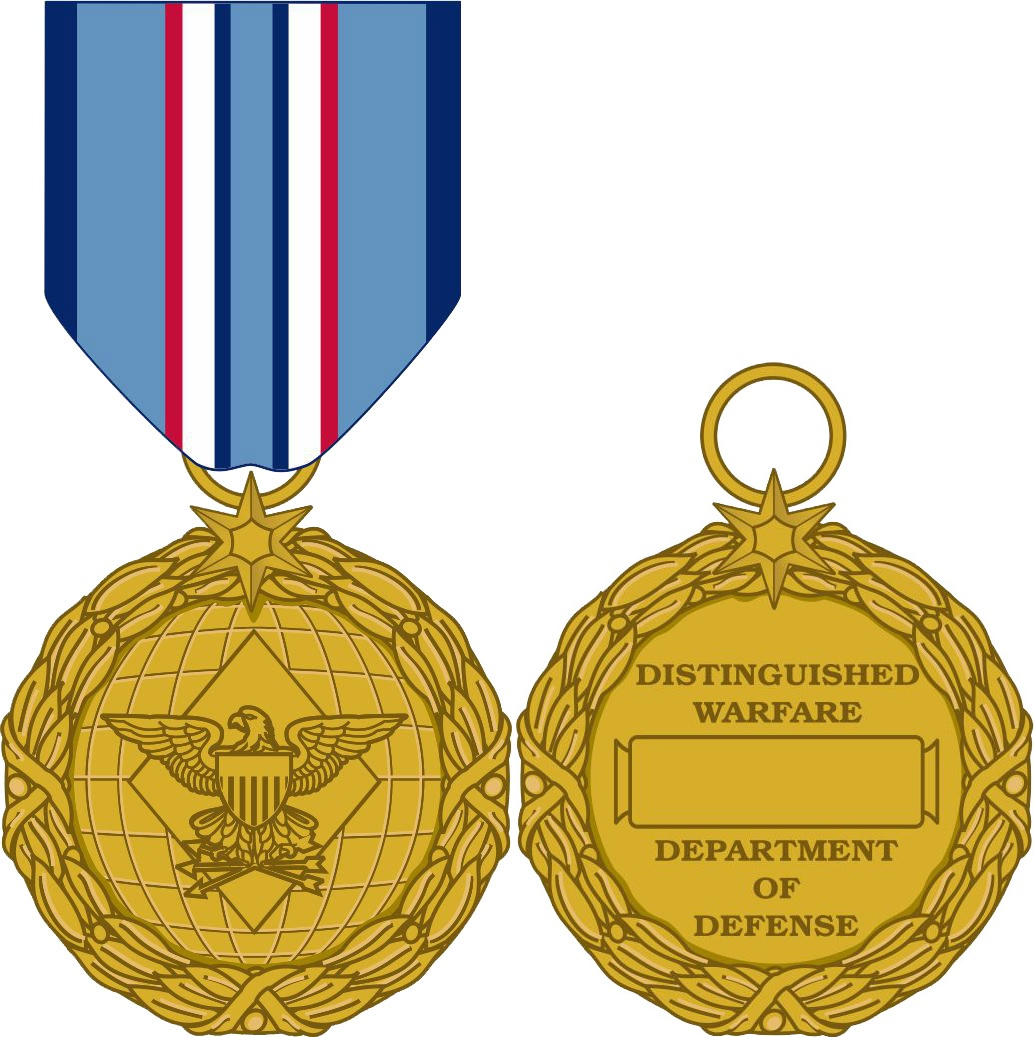
- Distinguished Warfare Medal
- Type: Military decoration
- Presented by: Department of Defense
- Eligibility: Members of the United States military
- Established: 13 February 2013
- First award: Cancelled 15 April 2013

Highlights
- Total: 0
- Distinguished Warfare Medal service ribbon

The Distinguished Warfare Medal was a planned United States military decoration announced by former U.S. Secretary of Defense Leon Panetta on 13 February 2013. It would have been the first U.S. combat-related award to be created since the Bronze Star Medal in 1944. The blue, red and white-ribboned medal was to be awarded to individuals for "extraordinary achievement" related to a military operation occurring after 11 September 2001. It was intended to recognize military achievement in cyberwarfare or combat drone operations for actions that did not include valor in combat.

Reception for the medal was mixed, with veterans criticizing the relatively high placement of the medal in the order of precedence. Production of the medal was halted on 12 March 2013, pending a review of its precedence as ordered by Secretary of Defense, Chuck Hagel. It was subsequently cancelled by Secretary Hagel on 15 April 2013 who made the decision to instead create and offer a new distinguishing device to existing medals. On 8 January 2016, the DoD presented two new award devices in accordance with this directive.

== Criteria ==
The intention of the Distinguished Warfare Medal involved recognizing – in the name of the Secretary of Defense – extraordinary achievement by members of the United States Armed Forces. Such achievement would have taken place after 11 September 2001, and need not have involved acts of valor. The criteria required that the qualifying achievement must have had a direct impact, through any domain, on combat or other military operations. (Note: "Direct impact" on an operation means the "hands-on" employment of weapons systems, including those controlled remotely, or other activities through any domain that had a direct impact on an engagement or operation. When making reference to "through any domain" in the award criteria, this means operations may take place in air, sea, land, and cyberspace.) These operations must have occurred under one of the following circumstances:

- engaged in military operations against enemies of the United States
- engaged in operations in conflict against an opposing foreign force
- while serving with friendly foreign forces engaged in operations with an opposing armed force where the United States is not a belligerent party

The achievement would need to be of such an outstanding or exceptional nature as to set the individual apart from peers serving in similar duties or situations. The medal was only to be awarded for single exemplary acts and would not have been awarded for sustained operational service. The Distinguished Warfare Medal could have been awarded posthumously.

Additional awards of the Distinguished Warfare Medal would be shown with oak leaf clusters for U.S. Army and U.S. Air Force awardees, and with 5/16-inch stars for U.S. Navy, U.S. Marine Corps, and U.S. Coast Guard awardees.

Prior to cancellation, the service secretaries had not completed developing the criteria for the medal for each of their military services. The awarding criteria would have been included in the next Manual of Military Decorations and Awards.

== Appearance ==
The Distinguished Warfare Medal was to consist of a 1 7/8-inch bronze medallion. The obverse would have depicted a grid lined globe surrounded by a laurel wreath. Superimposed over the globe is the eagle from the Seal of the United States Department of Defense in front of a lozenge. The top of the medallion is surmounted by a six-pointed star. The reverse continues the laurel wreath design surmounted by a six-pointed star. In the center is a blank space for engraving the recipient's name. Above the space is the inscription DISTINGUISHED WARFARE, below is the inscription DEPARTMENT OF DEFENSE.

The medallion would have been borne by a light blue ribbon with dark blue edges. In the center would have been two white stripes bordered by red on their outsides and dark blue on the inside.

The symbolism of the medal would have stated as the following:

The wreath honors the recipient's significant meritorious achievement to battlefield operations. The globe and gridlines signify that the operational support or other military engagement may be performed remotely. The diamond shape symbolizes the four corners of the globe, representing the operational reach of our armed forces in the defense of liberty and justice. The DoD Eagle indicates that the medal is presented in the name of the Secretary of Defense. Operational magnitude and mission success are denoted by the six pointed star, symbolizing an ordinance burst and target neutralization.

Designed by the United States Army Institute of Heraldry, it was reviewed by the United States Commission of Fine Arts.

== Reception ==
The medal's order of precedence was criticized by the Veterans of Foreign Wars. The commander of this organization, John Hamilton, explained, "It is very important to properly recognize all who faithfully serve and excel, but this new medal – no matter how well intended – could quickly deteriorate into a morale issue. Medals that can only be earned in direct combat must mean more than medals awarded in the rear." The Military Order of the Purple Heart joined in condemnation, stating "To rank what is basically an award for meritorious service higher than any award for heroism is degrading and insulting to every American Combat Soldier, Airman, Sailor or Marine who risks his or her life and endures the daily rigors of combat in a hostile environment. The Military Order of the Purple Heart strongly urges the newly appointed Secretary of Defense and the Joint Chiefs of Staff to either reconsider the precedence of the Distinguished Warfare Medal or develop another way to recognize the achievements of those whose indirect actions contribute greatly to the accomplishment of the mission without diminishing the sacrifice of life and limb by those who confront the enemy firsthand on the battlefield." The Association of the United States Navy also expressed criticism of the medal's placement, stating "While AUSN supports the medal itself, as well as the achievements and importance of the cyber warfare community, the concern lies with the ranking of the medal." Doug Sterner, military medals expert and curator of the Military Times Hall of Valor, expressed confusion, saying, "I understand the need to recognize the guys at the console who are doing some pretty important things. But to see it ranking above the Bronze Star (with) V?" Nick McDowell, a member of the Orders and Medals Society of America said that an alternative to adding a new medal could be adding a new ribbon device to an existing medal, and said that "The problem is that we're adding another non-valor personal decoration into a system that is already crowded with non-valor personal decorations."

Outgoing Secretary of Defense Leon Panetta defended the award's precedence, saying "Our military reserves its highest decorations obviously for those who display gallantry and valor in actions when their lives are on the line and we will continue to do so. But we should also have the ability to honor the extraordinary actions that make a true difference in combat operations. The contribution they make does contribute to the success of combat operations, particularly when they remove the enemy from the field of battle, even if those actions are physically removed from the fight." Pentagon spokesman, Lieutenant Commander Nate Christensen, added, "Extraordinary achievement directly impacting combat operations at this level deserves to be recognized with a distinctive medal, not a device on an existing medal. The DWM is visionary in that it fills a need for a non-valorous combat impact medal."

On 26 February, three military veteran congressmen (Duncan D. Hunter, Tom Rooney, and Tim Murphy) introduced legislation in the House of Representatives to reduce the precedence of the medal, by banning it from being rated equal to, or above, the Purple Heart. At the time of the medal's cancellation, that bill had gained 124 cosponsors, while a corresponding bill introduced in the Senate on 6 March had gained 31 cosponsors.

== Cancellation ==
On 12 March 2013, it was reported that the Secretary of Defense, Chuck Hagel, ordered a review of the medal and its initial place in the order of precedence. On 15 April, he announced its cancellation, noting that it would be an "unnecessary" medal. Initially, it was speculated that the precedence order of the medal would be lowered from its current position above the Purple Heart and Bronze Star Medal. Instead, Hagel announced that the medal would be replaced by a new "distinguishing" device that could be attached to an existing medal or service ribbon. In 2017, it was announced that a "R" device would be retroactively implemented to January 2016 for "hands-on employment of a weapon system or other war-fighting activities with direct and immediate impact on an operation."

== See also ==
- Awards and decorations of the United States military
