= "V" device =

Bronze device worn on military ribbons

- Bronze "V" device
- Type: Ribbon device
- Awarded for: Heroism in combat (Note: From 1945 until 2 February 2017, criteria varied among the services for the award of a medal with the "V" device. While the Army awarded the "V" solely to denote "participation in acts of heroism involving conflict with an armed enemy," the Navy and Marine Corps also awarded the "V" to recognize individuals who are "exposed to personal hazard during direct participation in combat operations", and the Air Force included provisions for awarding the "V" to members who were "placed in harm's way" during contingency deployment operations.)
- Presented by: United States
- Status: In use
- Established: 22 December 1945

Precedence
- Next (lower): "C" device

A "V" device is a metal 1/4-inch (6.4 mm) capital letter "V" with serifs which, when worn on certain decorations awarded by the United States Armed Forces, distinguishes a decoration awarded for combat valor or heroism from the same decoration being awarded for a member's actions under circumstances other than combat.

The decorations with which a "V" may be authorized differ among the military services, as well as the manner in which the "V" is worn and the name by which it is referred to. Until 2017, each service also used different criteria in determining whether a "V" could be authorized.

== Etymology ==
The Department of Defense, Army, and Air Force refer to the "V" as the "V" device. The Coast Guard refers to it as the Valor Device, while the Navy and Marine Corps refer to it as the Combat Distinguishing Device or Combat "V". When referring to a medal that has been awarded with the "V" device, it is often referred to as having been awarded "with valor".

== History ==
U.S. Navy and Marine Corps ribbon of the Achievement Medal with "V" device denoting combat bravery; the "V" device ceased being awarded with Achievement Medals in late 2016.

On 22 December 1945, in War Department Circular 383, the United States Army decided to introduce the "V" device to distinguish the award of a Bronze Star Medal for acts of valor and heroism, rather than meritorious service. Soldiers, including Army airmen, who were awarded the Bronze Star Medal for heroism in combat were now authorized to wear a bronze "V" on the suspension and service ribbon of the medal. Only one "V" was allowed to be worn on a ribbon. The Department of the Navy introduced the "V" as the "Combat Distinguishing Device", and on 15 February 1946, authorized the "V" device to be worn on the Legion of Merit and Bronze Star Medal for services or acts performed in actual combat with the enemy; in February 1947, this was changed to acts or services involving direct participation in combat operations. Most World War II veterans who were entitled to the "V" probably did not know about or apply for the device, since large-scale separations from the services were taking place after the war ended. Stocks of the device also were not available for issue for at least a year after the issuance of the Army circular.

To be worn on a decoration, the "V" device must have been specifically authorized in the written award citation issued with the medal. In 1996, the "V" device garnered public attention after the suicide of Admiral Jeremy Boorda, who was the Chief of Naval Operations. The news media reported that his death by suicide may have been caused by a Navy investigation following a story by Newsweek about Boorda wearing two "combat valor pins" on the service ribbons of his uniform, which he received for duty as a weapons officer and executive officer aboard two naval ships off the coast of Indochina during the Vietnam War. Although there were indications these "combat distinguishing devices" were authorized to be worn on his Navy Commendation Medal and Navy Achievement Medal, the Department of the Navy Board For Correction of Naval Records determined after his death that both of the devices were not authorized to be worn on the two decorations.

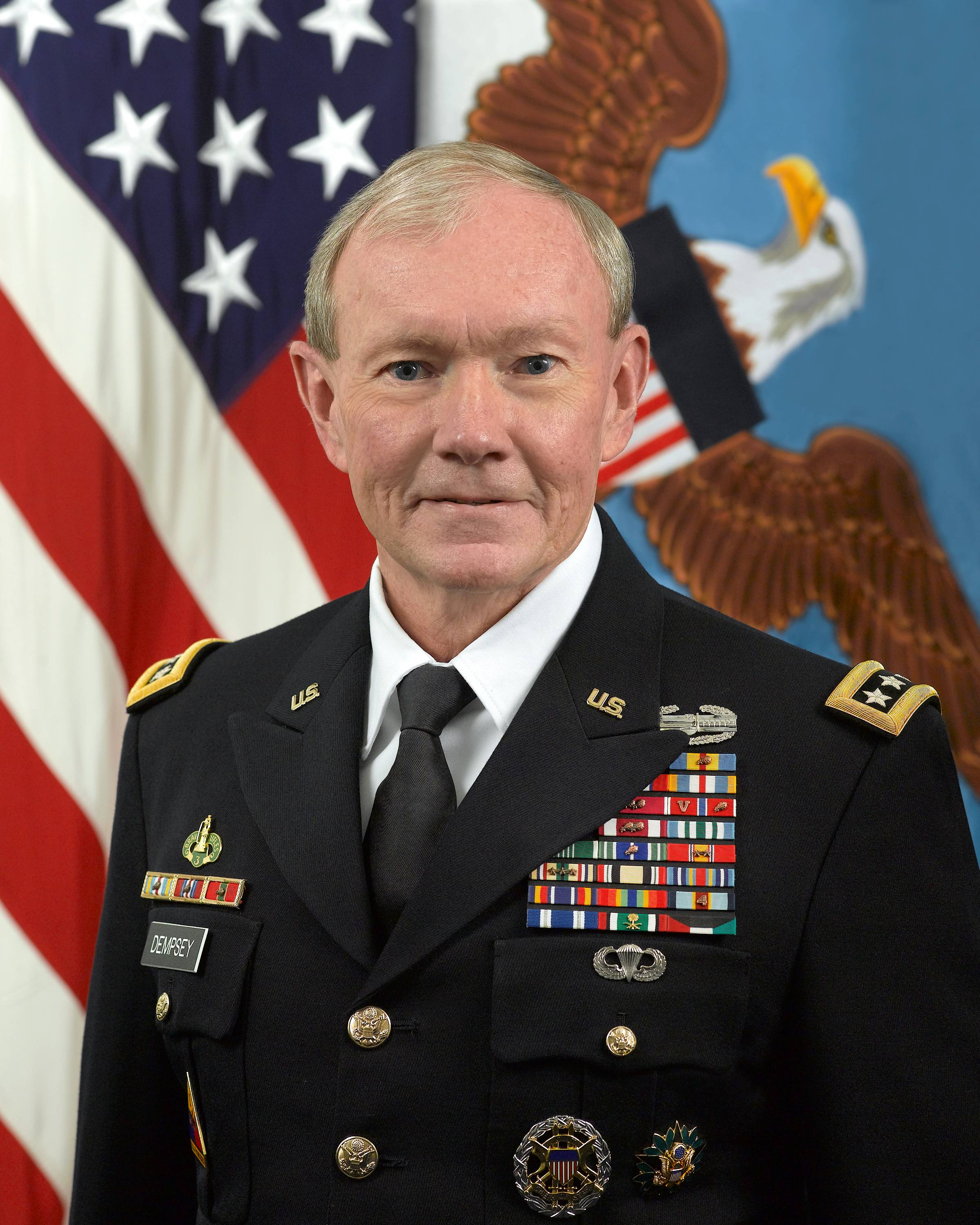
General Martin Dempsey in 2012 wearing a Bronze Star ribbon (third row from top, right side) with "V" device.

In 2011, the Department of Defense changed its awards manual regulations concerning the Medal of Honor (MOH), specifying that the "V" device instead of the oak leaf cluster and 5/16 inch star would be used to denote additional citations in the rare event of a service member being awarded a second MOH. By May 2015, the Department of Defense changed its awards manual again concerning the MOH, specifying that a separate MOH is presented to an individual for each succeeding act that justifies an award. There has not been a living repeat MOH-recipient since the World War I era, so the "V" device was never worn in this fashion by a living recipient.

Until 2017, the criteria and conditions under which the "V" device could be awarded differed among the services. For the Army, the "V" was worn solely to denote "participation in acts of heroism involving conflict with an armed enemy". For the Navy, Marine Corps, and Coast Guard, the "V" could be worn to denote combat heroism, or to recognize individuals who were "exposed to personal hazard during direct participation in combat operations". For the Air Force, the "V" could be worn on the Bronze Star Medal to denote heroism in combat, but also on the Commendation Medal and Achievement Medal to denote heroism or for being "placed in harm's way" during contingency deployment operations.

Prior to 1 January 2014, the device was also authorized on Outstanding Unit Awards and Organizational Excellence Awards to indicate the unit participated in direct combat support actions. The "V" device is also authorized for the Air Medal by all the services where heroism in aerial combat was involved on an individual mission. On 15 August 2016, the Coast Guard changed their criteria such that new awards of the "V" would be for valor only, to denote a heroic act or acts while participating in conflict or combat with an armed enemy. On 6 January 2016, the Department of Defense announced that it was revising its military decorations and awards program to include a "V" device change to its original 1940s use of denoting heroism in combat only on specific decorations for the military services. The "C" device and "R" device, introduced in March 2017, are now also used on relevant awards.

=== Device changes ===
On 2 February 2017, new silver-plated and gold-plated "V" devices were introduced, followed by wreathed versions in September which led to speculation that the various versions of the "V" device would now indicate how many times a specific medal was awarded with the "V." The U.S. Air Force uniform regulations update of 15 April 2019, was the first to describe and depict the new "V" devices as follows:

V Device Multiple Awards since 2016
Bronze V*	Silver V	Gold V**	Bronze V with Wreath	Silver V with Wreath	Gold V with Wreath
1st Award	2nd Award	3rd Award	4th Award	5th Award	6th Award

*Standard device for the U.S. Army and U.S. Air Force before December 2016

**Standard device for the U.S. Navy and U.S. Marine Corps before December 2016

On 21 December 2016, the "V" device ceased being authorized for Achievement Medals. Retroactive to January 2016, the "V" device ceased being authorized for the Legion of Merit, being replaced by the "C" device.

== Decorations eligible for the "V" device ==
Currently, the following decorations of the United States Armed Forces are eligible to be awarded with a "V" device.

Decoration	Army	Naval Service	Air and Space Forces	Coast Guard	DoD Joint Service
Distinguished Flying Cross	Yes	Yes	Yes	Yes	
Bronze Star Medal	Yes	Yes	Yes	Yes	
Air Medal	Yes	Yes	Yes	Yes	
Commendation Medals	Yes	Yes	Yes	Yes	Yes

== Army, Air Force and Space Force ==
For the Army and the Air Force, the "V" is positioned to the right of any bronze or silver oak leaf clusters from the wearer's perspective, or positioned in the center of the service ribbon if worn alone.

Distinguished Flying Cross, awarded for valor
Bronze Star Medal, two awards, of which at least one was for valor
Air Medal (Army), three awards, of which at least one was for valor (Army uses bronze award numerals)
Air Medal (Air Force), three awards, of which at least one was for valor (Air Force uses oak leaf clusters)
Air Force Commendation Medal, four awards, of which at least one was for valor

Only 4 devices may be worn per ribbon; an additional ribbon is worn to the wearer's left when necessary to support additional devices:

Army Commendation Medal, nine awards, of which at least one was for valor
Army Commendation Medal, ten awards, of which at least one was for valor

=== Civil Air Patrol ===
Disaster relief ribbon

The Civil Air Patrol's Disaster Relief Ribbon is awarded for participation in five actual/evaluated disaster relief missions and completion of other requirements. It may also be awarded with a Silver "V" device to any CAP member who participates as a CAP member in a disaster relief effort for a Presidential-declared disaster. Participation in any Presidential declared disaster since 1990 qualifies.

== Navy, Marine Corps, and Coast Guard ==
For the Navy, Marine Corps, and Coast Guard, the "V" is always worn in the center of the service ribbon, while any gold or silver 5/16 Inch Stars are added in balance to the right and left of the "V" starting with the right side from the wearer's perspective. Marine Corps refer to it as Combat Distinguishing Device. The Navy, Marine Corps, and Coast Guard continue to award and issue the bronze version. The Marine Corps allows anodized medals and anodized Combat "V"s to be worn on the dress blues uniform.

Distinguished Flying Cross, awarded for valor
Bronze Star Medal, two awards, of which at least one was for valor
Air Medal, three awards, of which at least one was for valor (The gold award numeral 3 on the left denotes three individual awards of the Air Medal (only for Navy and Marine Corps))
Air Medal, three awards, of which at least one was for valor (Coast Guard uses award stars)
Navy and Marine Corps Commendation Medal, eight awards, of which at least one was for valor
Coast Guard Commendation Medal, five awards, of which at least one was for valor

== Combined with Arabic numerals ==
Golden or brass Arabic numerals may be used to indicate the total number of times the medal was awarded if the total number of devices, of any types, exceed 4 total devices and would thus not fit on a single ribbon.

Total of four awards, of which at least one was for valor
Total of five awards, of which at least one was for valor
Total of nine awards, of which at least one was for valor

== See also ==
- Awards and decorations of the United States military
- United States military award devices
