= Citation Star =

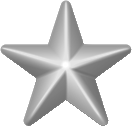
- Army Silver Star (3/16")
- Type: Personal Valor Decoration
- Awarded for: "Gallantry in action against an enemy of the United States"
- Presented by: the Department of War
- Status: No longer awarded
- Established: 9 July 1918 (Retroactive to 15 April 1861); 19 July 1932 - Silver Star Medal
- World War I Victory Medal Ribbon with 4 Citation Stars

Precedence
- Next (higher): Army Distinguished Service Medal; Navy Distinguished Service Medal
- Equivalent: Silver Star Medal

The Citation Star was a Department of War personal valor decoration issued as a ribbon device which was first established by the United States Congress on July 9, 1918 (Bulletin No. 43, War Dept. 1918). When awarded, a 3/16-inch (4.8 mm) silver star was placed on the suspension ribbon and service ribbon of the World War I Victory Medal to denote a Citation (certificate) for "Gallantry In Action" was awarded to a soldier, or to a marine or Navy corpsman attached to the Army's Second Division (2nd Infantry Division), American Expeditionary Forces. The Citation Star was replaced in 1932 with the introduction of the Silver Star Medal.

== Authorization ==
To receive a Citation Star, an individual had to be officially cited in orders by a General Order Number. The Citation Star is authorized retroactively to denote being cited for gallantry in action back to the American Civil War. General Henry Jervey, Office of the Chief of Staff, in a letter dated February 26, 1926, wrote:

The Secretary of War directs as follows - The following is the amended version of paragraph 187 of Army Regulation: "No more than one Medal of Honor or one Distinguished Service Cross or one Distinguished Service Medal shall be issued to any one person, but for each succeeding or act sufficient to justify the award of a Medal of Honor or Distinguished Service Cross or Distinguished Service Medal, respectively, a bronze oak leaf cluster, shall be issued in lieu thereof; and for each citation of an officer or enlisted man for gallantry in action, published in orders from headquarters of a force commanded by a general officer, not warranting the issue of a Medal of Honor, Distinguished Service Cross or Distinguished Service Medal, he shall wear a silver star, 3/16 inch in diameter, as prescribed in Uniform Regulations."

Army Regulation 600-40 specified that the "Citation Star" would be worn above a campaign clasp on the suspension ribbon of the medal and to the wearer's right of the bronze service stars on the service ribbon. Authorized Army Citation Stars may be worn on the following service medals:

- World War I Victory Medal
- Civil War Campaign Medal
- Indian Campaign Medal
- Spanish Campaign Medal
- Philippine Campaign Medal
- China Campaign Medal
- Mexican Service Medal

== Silver Star Medal ==
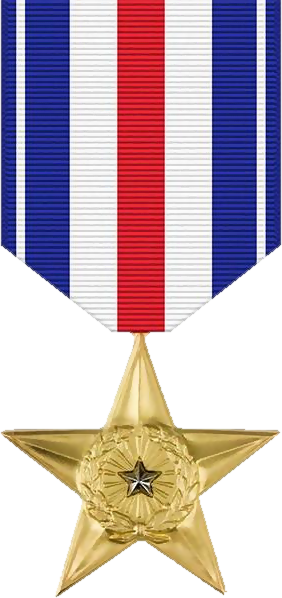
Silver Star Medal

On July 19, 1932, the United States Secretary of War approved the Silver Star Medal to replace the Citation Star (3/16 inch "Silver Star"). The Silver Star Medal is a large gold hue gilt-bronze star which displays a 3/16" Silver Star in the center of the medal hung from a red, white, and blue ribbon. Recipients of the Citation Star could exchange the award for the medal. In August 1932, US Army Chief of Staff General Douglas MacArthur received the first Silver Star Medal, with one silver and one bronze oak leaf cluster converted from the seven Citation Stars he received for World War I.

An act of Congress authorized the Silver Star Medal for the Navy on 7 August and the Army on 16 December 1942 during World War II (retroactive to 7 December 1941). The Army referred to the award as the "Silver Star" and the Navy referred to the award as the "Silver Star Medal". Additional awards from the Navy are denoted by gold and silver 5/16" stars. The Department of Defense (DoD) refers to the decoration as the "Silver Star Medal" (SSM).

Also during World War II, a silver 3/16 inch "service star" began being worn on certain medals in lieu of five bronze 3/16-inch service stars.

== Navy Commendation Star ==
World War I Victory Medal Ribbon with one Navy Commendation Star

The Department of the Navy also authorized a 3/16 inch "silver star" named the Navy Commendation Star (Navy Letter of Commendation Star) for those sailors and marines commended for performance of duty by the Secretary of the Navy which also was to be placed on the World War I Victory Medal for each citation. The Army and Navy 3/16 inch Silver Stars were not considered equivalent awards, however, as the Navy Commendation Star could not be exchanged for the Silver Star Medal.

At the start of World War II, the Navy Commendation Star was declared obsolete and none were issued after 1941. In 1943, a Navy Commendation Ribbon was authorized. In the 1950s, the Department of the Navy began accepting applications from eligible World War I veterans who were authorized the Navy Commendation Star to be reissued the Navy Commendation Ribbon with Metal Pendant. In 1960 and 1994, this decoration was renamed the Navy Commendation Medal and Navy and Marine Corps Commendation Medal. Additional awards of this medal are also denoted by gold and silver 5/16" stars.

== See also ==
- United States military award devices
