= Strike/Flight numerals =

Award displayed on military ribbons

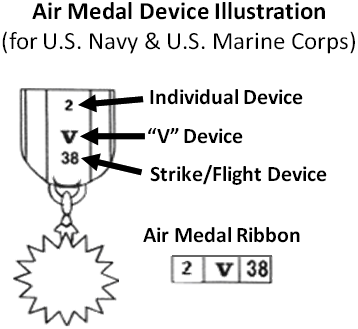

Air Medal ribbon bar with two gold 5/16 inch stars, Combat "V", and Strike/Flight Numeral 3

A Strike/Flight Numeral is a Department of the Navy device that may be awarded for wear on the Air Medal to individuals serving in any capacity in the United States Armed Forces. A Strike/Flight Award is awarded to individuals for meritorious achievement while participating in sustained aerial flight operations, under flight orders. Strike/Flight Numerals are bronze Arabic numerals 5/16 inch in height and are worn to denote the total number of Strike/Flight awards.

Only personnel under flight orders are eligible to receive the strike/flight award of an Air Medal. Officers in the rank of Captain (Colonel in the Marine Corps) or above are not eligible for award of the Air Medal on a strike/flight basis unless the sorties they fly are required in the performance of their regular duties.

- Strikes are sorties that deliver ordnance against the enemy, insert or extract assault personnel, or engage in Search and Rescue (SAR) operations that encounter enemy opposition.
- Flights are sorties that deliver ordnance against the enemy, insert or extract assault personnel, or engage in Search and Rescue (SAR) operations that encounter no enemy opposition. The distinguishing feature of a flight is that although it takes place in a nominally hostile environment, it does not encounter enemy opposition.

As of September 27, 2006, gold 5/16 inch Arabic numerals are used to denote the number of "Individual" Air Medals. This is a return to the standard used before November 22, 1989. In the interval between November 22, 1989, and September 27, 2006, bronze, gold, and silver 5/16 inch stars denoted the number of "Individual" Air Medals awarded. A bronze star was used to denote a first award and gold stars were used for the second through the fifth awards, seventh through tenth awards, and so on. Silver stars were used in lieu of five gold stars, and denote the sixth and eleventh (and so on) awards.

== See also ==
- United States military award devices
- Awards and decorations of the United States military
