= Commendation Medal =

United States military decoration

Commendation Medals
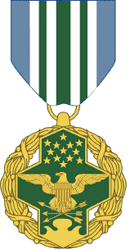
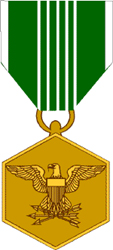
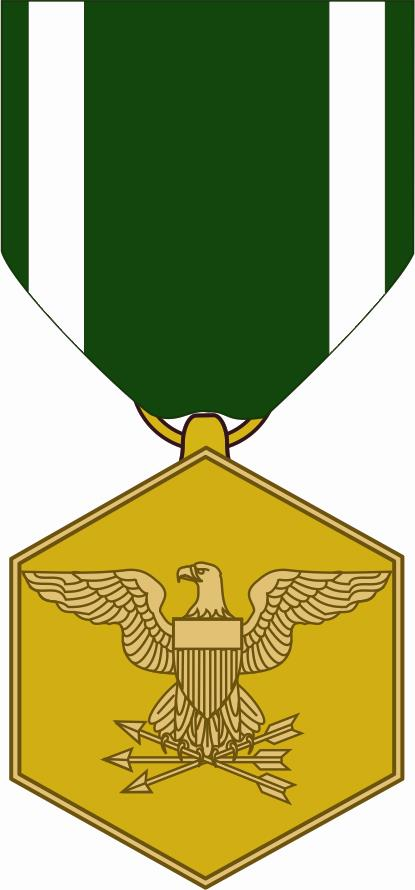
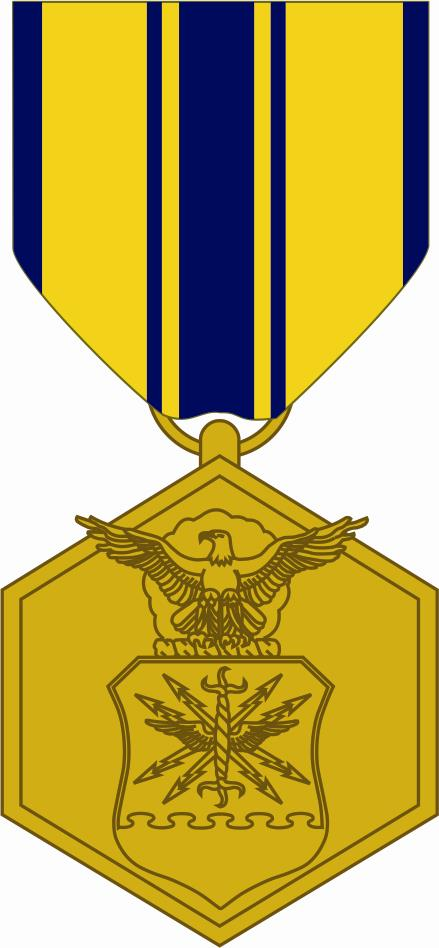
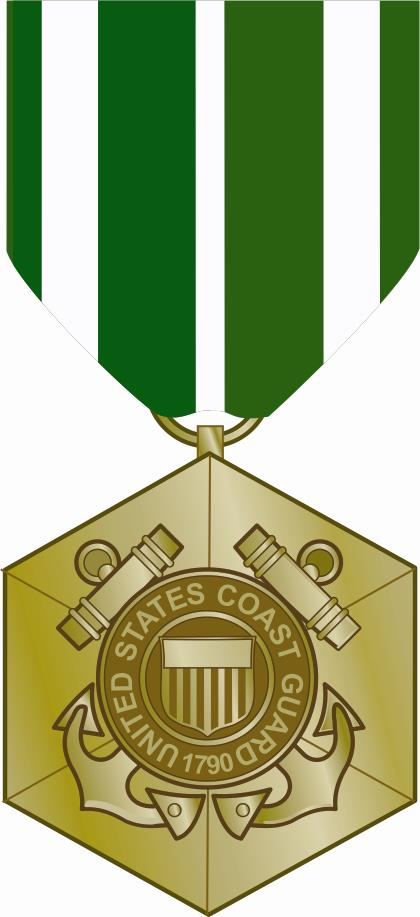
- Five Commendation Medals are awarded by branch or service. From left to right: Joint Service, Army, Naval Service, Air and Space Forces, and Coast Guard.
- Type: Military medal (decoration)
- Awarded for: Heroism, meritorious achievement, or meritorious service
- Presented by: United States Department of Defense; United States Department of the Army; United States Department of the Navy; United States Department of the Air Force; United States Department of Homeland Security
- Eligibility: Military personnel only
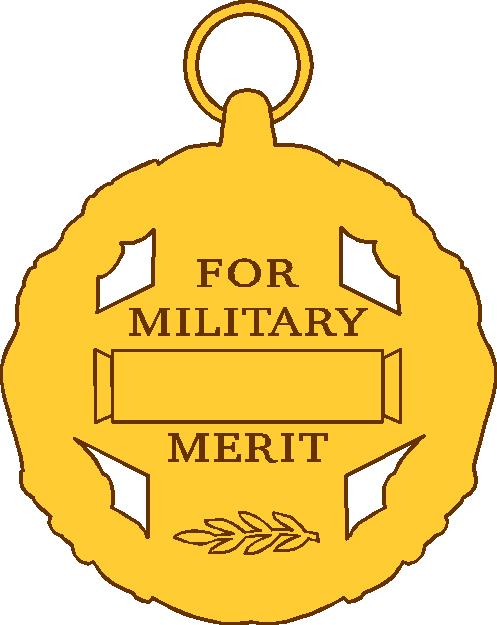
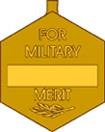
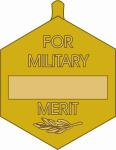
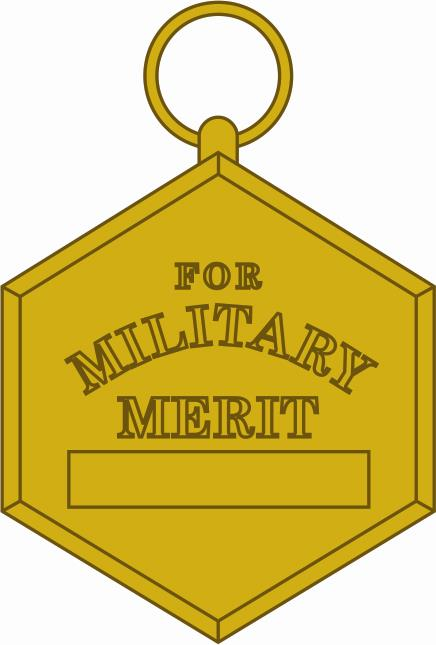
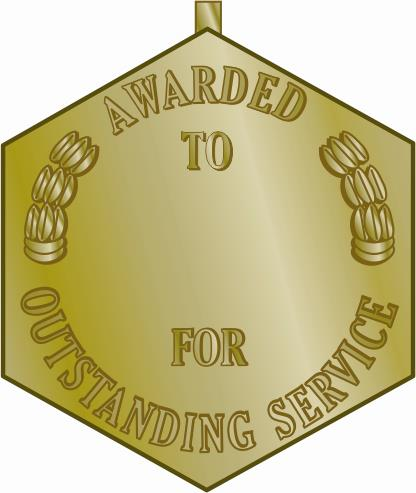
- Reverse: Joint Service Army Navy USAF USCG
- Status: Currently awarded
- Established: Naval Service: 1943; Coast Guard: 1943; Army: 1945; Air and Space Forces: 1958; Joint Service: 1963
- Five Commendation ribbons are awarded by branch or service. Top row: Joint Service, Army. Bottom row: Naval Service, Air and Space Forces, Coast Guard.

Precedence
- Next (higher): Army, Naval Service, and Coast Guard: Air Medal; Air and Space Forces: Aerial Achievement Medal
- Next (lower): Joint Service Achievement Medal

The Commendation Medal is a United States military decoration presented for sustained acts of heroism or meritorious service. Each branch of the United States Armed Forces issues its own version of the Commendation Medal, with a fifth version existing for acts of joint military service performed under the Department of Defense.

The Commendation Medal was originally only a service ribbon and was first awarded by the U.S. Navy and U.S. Coast Guard in 1943. An Army Commendation Ribbon followed in 1945 and in 1949 the Navy, Coast Guard, and Army Commendation ribbons were renamed the "Commendation Ribbon with Metal Pendant". By 1960 the Commendation Ribbons had been authorized as full medals and were subsequently referred to as Commendation Medals.

Additional awards of the Army and Air and Space Commendation Medals are denoted by bronze and silver oak leaf clusters. The Navy and Marine Corps Commendation Medal and Coast Guard Commendation Medal are authorized gold and silver 5/16 inch stars to denote additional awards. The Operational Distinguishing Device ("O" device) is authorized for wear on the Coast Guard Commendation Medal upon approval of the awarding authority. Order of Precedence is following the Air Medal but before the Prisoner of War Medal and all campaign medals. Each of the military services also awards separate Achievement Medals which are below the Commendation Medals in precedence.

== Variants ==
For valorous actions in direct contact with an enemy but of a lesser degree than required for the award of the Bronze Star Medal, a Commendation Medal with "V" Device or Combat "V" (Navy/Marine Corps/Coast Guard) is awarded; the "V" device may be authorized for wear on the service and suspension ribbon of the medal to denote valor. On January 7, 2016 The "C" device or Combat "C" was created and may be authorized for wear on the service and suspension ribbon of the Commendation Medal to distinguish an award for meritorious service or achievement under the most arduous combat conditions (while the Soldier/Sailor/Marine was personally exposed to hostile action or in an area where other Servicemembers were actively engaged). A Commendation Medal with Combat Device is unofficially named the "Combat Commendation" and is often considered to be a higher level form of the Commendation Medal, regardless of the Awarding Branch. Retroactive award of the "C" device is not approved for medals awarded before January 7, 2016.

== Joint Service ==
The Joint Service Commendation Medal (JSCM) was authorized on June 25, 1963, and is awarded in the name of the secretary of defense to members of the Armed Forces of the United States who, after January 1, 1963, distinguished themselves by meritorious achievement or service in a joint duty capacity.

This award is intended for senior service on a joint military staff and is senior in precedence to service-specific Commendation Medals. As such, it is worn above the service Commendation Medals on a military uniform.

=== Devices ===
- Oak leaf cluster (for subsequent awards)
- "V" Device (for valorous actions in direct contact with an enemy)

== Army ==
The Army Commendation Medal (ARCOM) is awarded to any member of the Armed Forces of the United States other than General Officers who, while serving in any capacity with the U.S. Army after December 6, 1941, distinguished themselves by heroism, meritorious achievement or meritorious service. The medal may be awarded to a member of another branch of the U.S. Armed Forces or of a friendly foreign nation who, after June 1, 1962, distinguishes themselves by an act of heroism, extraordinary achievement, or significant meritorious service which has been of mutual benefit to the friendly nation and the United States.

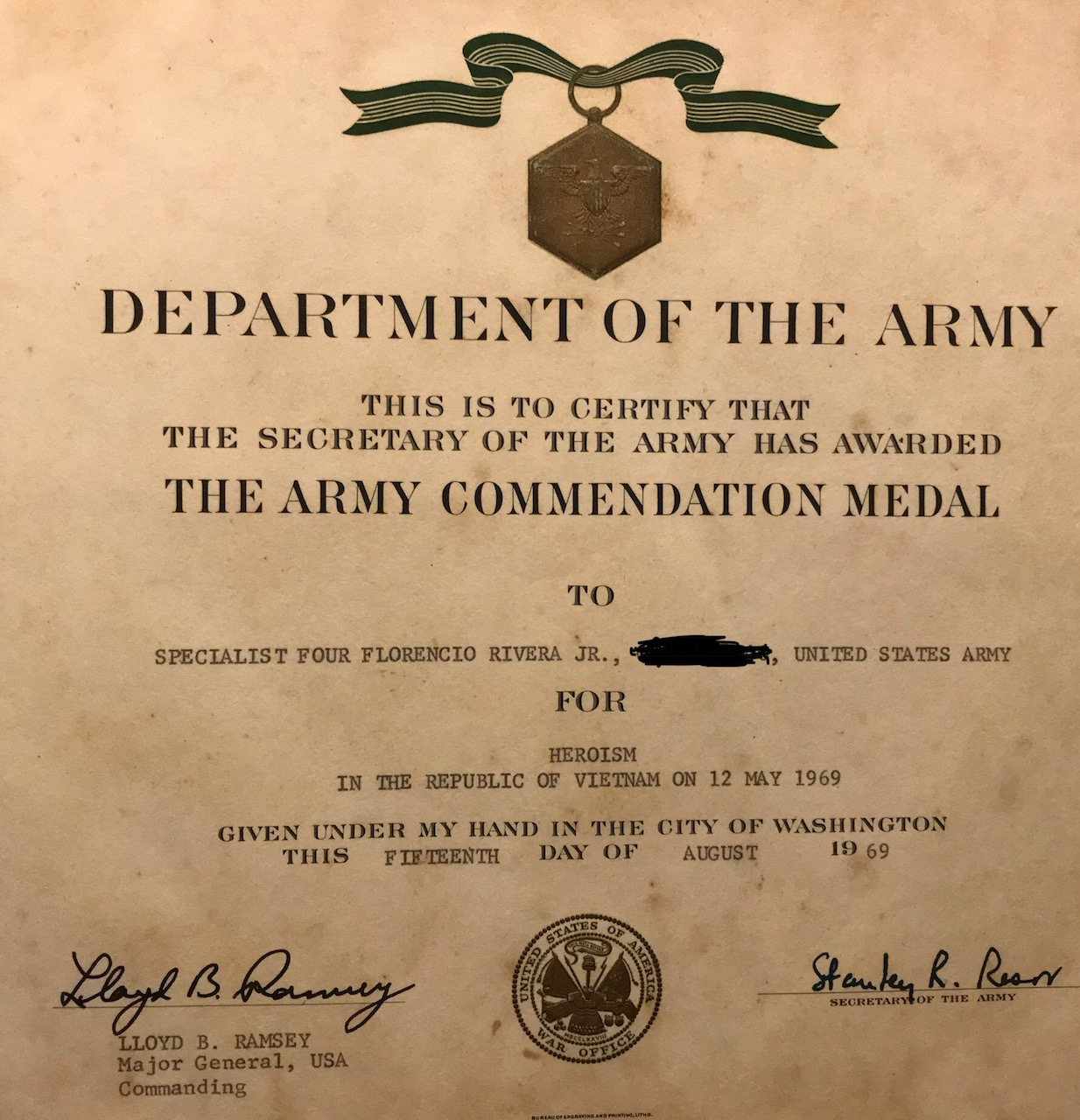

=== Criteria and appearance ===
The Army Commendation Medal is awarded to American and foreign military personnel in the grade of O-6 (colonel in the U.S. Army) and below who have performed noteworthy service in any capacity with the United States Army. Qualifying service for the award of the medal can be for distinctive meritorious achievement and service, acts of courage involving no voluntary risk of life, or sustained meritorious performance of duty. Approval of the award must be made by an officer in the grade of colonel (O-6) or higher.

The medallion of the Army Commendation Medal is a bronze hexagon, 1 3/8 inches wide. On the medallion is an American bald eagle with wings spread horizontally, grasping in its talons three crossed arrows. On its breast is a shield paly of thirteen pieces and a chief. The reverse bears a panel for naming between the words FOR MILITARY above and MERIT below, all placed above a laurel sprig. The ribbon is 1 3/8 inches wide primarily of myrtle green. It is edged in white and in the center are five thin white stripes spaced equally apart.

=== Devices ===
- Oak leaf cluster (for subsequent awards)
- "V" Device (for valorous actions in direct contact with an enemy)
- "C" Device (for meritorious service or achievement under combat conditions. Unofficially called the Combat Commendation. Retroactive Awards are not authorized for medals awarded before January 7, 2016)
- "R" Device (for direct and immediate impact on combat operations from a remote location)

=== Notable recipients ===
- Phyllis J. Wilson, 5th Command Chief Warrant Officer of the United States Army Reserve

== Navy, Marine Corps, and Coast Guard ==
After World War I, the Department of the Navy authorized the Navy Commendation Star, a ribbon device to be placed on the World War I Victory Medal. The 3/16 inch silver star was identical to the Army Citation Star, but not comparable, as the latter recognized "gallantry in action", while the Navy Commendation Star denoted those who had been cited and commended for performance of duty by the Secretary of the Navy.

An independent Navy Commendation Ribbon was established in November 1943. On March 22, 1950, a metal pendant (of the same design as the pendant of the Army Commendation Medal) was authorized and the Commendation Ribbon was renamed the Navy Commendation Ribbon with Metal Pendant. This award was re-designated as the Navy Commendation Medal in September 1960, and renamed the Navy and Marine Corps Commendation Medal in 1994. This decoration was previously awarded only by flag rank operational commanders, requiring the signature of an admiral or general officer in the grade of O-7, allowing interpretation of the criteria for which the medal may be awarded. Authority to award this decoration was later expanded to captains and colonels in the grade of O-6 currently holding operational command as a commodore, carrier air wing commander or commanding officer.

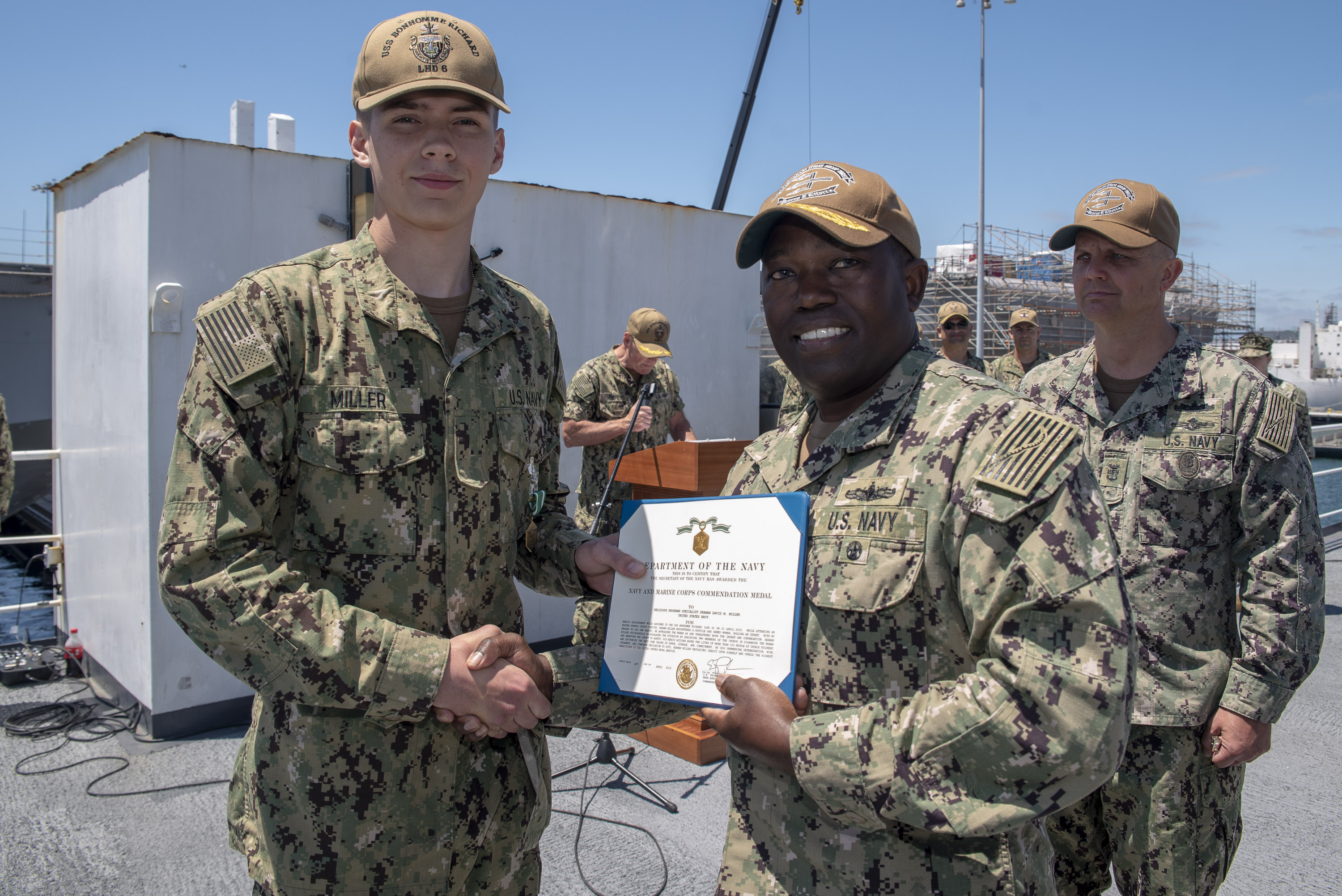
A sailor receives a certificate of the award from Rear Admiral Cedric Pringle in 2019.

Recipient members of the U.S. Marine Corps have always been issued the Navy's commendation medal and there is not a separate commendation medal intended only for Marines. This lack of difference was recognized on August 19, 1994, when Secretary of the Navy John Howard Dalton changed the name of the Navy Commendation Medal to the Navy and Marine Corps Commendation Medal.

The U.S. Coast Guard awards a separate Coast Guard Commendation Medal, with a ribbon similar in design to that of its Navy and Marine Corps counterpart. Initially established as the Coast Guard Commendation Ribbon in 1947, it was redesignated as the Coast Guard Commendation Medal in 1959. Criteria for its award has paralleled that of the Navy and Marine Corps.

=== Devices ===
- 5/16 inch star, Combat "V", and Operational Distinguishing Device (Coast Guard)

=== Notable recipients ===
- Richard Nixon: US President

== Air and Space Forces ==
The Department of the Air Force began issuing its own Air Force Commendation Medal in 1958 with additional awards denoted by oak leaf clusters. Prior to this time, USAF recipients received the Army Commendation Medal. It was not until 1996 that the "V" device was authorized on the Air Force Commendation Medal; prior to 1996, there was not a valor distinction in effect for the Air Force Commendation Medal. On January 7, 2016, the "C" device and "R" device was authorized on the Air Force Commendation Medal as well. For USAF enlisted personnel, the Air Force Commendation Medal is worth three points under the Air Force enlisted promotion system.

On November 16, 2020, it was renamed the Air and Space Commendation Medal (ASCOM) by the Secretary of the Air Force.

=== Criteria and appearance ===
The Air and Space Commendation Medal is awarded to both American and foreign military personnel of any service branch in the U.S. military grade of O-6 and below, the NATO grade of OF-5 and below, or of any other Allied or Coalition nation in the grade of Colonel or equivalent or below, or the naval grade of Captain or equivalent or below, who have performed noteworthy service in any capacity with the United States Air Force or United States Space Force. Qualifying service for the award of the medal can be for distinctive meritorious achievement and service, acts of courage involving no voluntary risk of life, or sustained meritorious performance of duty. Approval of the award must be made by an officer in the grade of Colonel or higher.

The Air and Space Commendation Medal is a bronze hexagonal medallion. On the medallion is a shield surmounted by an eagle superimposed over clouds. On the shield bears a pair of flyer's wings and a vertical baton with an eagle's claw at either end; behind the shield are eight lightning bolts. The design on the shield is derived from the Seal of the Department of the Air Force. The ribbon of the Air and Space Commendation Medal is golden yellow with blue edges. In the center are three bands of blue, the outer stripes are thin with the center stripe being wider.

=== Devices ===
- Oak leaf cluster (for subsequent awards)
- "V" device (for valorous actions in direct contact with an enemy)
- "C" device (for meritorious service in direct contact with an enemy)
- "R" device (for employment of a remote weapon system during military operations)

US Military Services Commendation Medals
Joint Service Commendation Medal	Army Commendation Medal	Navy Commendation Medal	Coast Guard Commendation Medal	Air and Space Commendation Medal

== See also ==
- Awards and decorations of the United States government
- Awards and decorations of the United States military
- Awards and decorations of the United States Coast Guard
- United States military award devices
