= Gold frame =

Attachment to a military decoration

A gold frame is an attachment to a military decoration which is issued by the militaries of some countries. The gold frame is designed to enclose an award ribbon and is usually a means of distinguishing the ribbon's special quality or denoting some additional achievement to the award's basic criteria.

The gold frame is normally an automatic attachment to a ribbon decoration. In certain cases, however, awards may be issued both with and without the gold frame depending upon the level of achievement. Such is the case in the United States Air Force which denotes the gold frame as a "gold border."

The gold frame and gold border is a device for ribbon awards only, and there are no provisions for issuing the attachment for medals.

== Australia ==
The Australian Ministry of Defence created both unit awards in 1991 via Letters Patent. Unlike the U.S. awards, the Australian frames are flames, not laurel leaves.

Unit Citation for Gallantry
Meritorious Unit Citation

== Luxembourg ==
The Croix de Guerre unit award was given by Luxembourg to several units during World War II and the U.S. Army allowed soldiers attached to those units to wear the decoration as a temporary unit award. It is not worn with the frame by Luxembourg's military. The decoration was permitted by Department of the Army General Order No. 43.

Croix de Guerre unit award (Luxembourg)

== Philippines ==
The award was first created in 1946 to honor U.S. military units and naval vessels that served in the defense and liberation of the Philippines. It has been awarded several times since including as recently as 2005.

Philippine Republic Presidential Unit Citation

== Republic of Vietnam ==
These awards were created by the Republic of Vietnam and were awarded to U.S. military members throughout the Vietnam War.

Vietnam Presidential Unit Citation	Huy chương Tổng thống	State of Vietnam Friendship Ribbon
Vietnam Gallantry Cross Unit Citation (Vietnam)	Anh-Dũng Bội-Tinh
Vietnam Civil Actions Unit Citation (Vietnam)	Dân-Vụ Bội-Tinh

== South Korea ==
This award has been given to U.S. military units since 1950. The award was also given to a number of United Nations member state's military units during the Korean War.

Presidential Unit Citation (Korea)	대통령부대표창

== United States ==
Gold Frame / Border
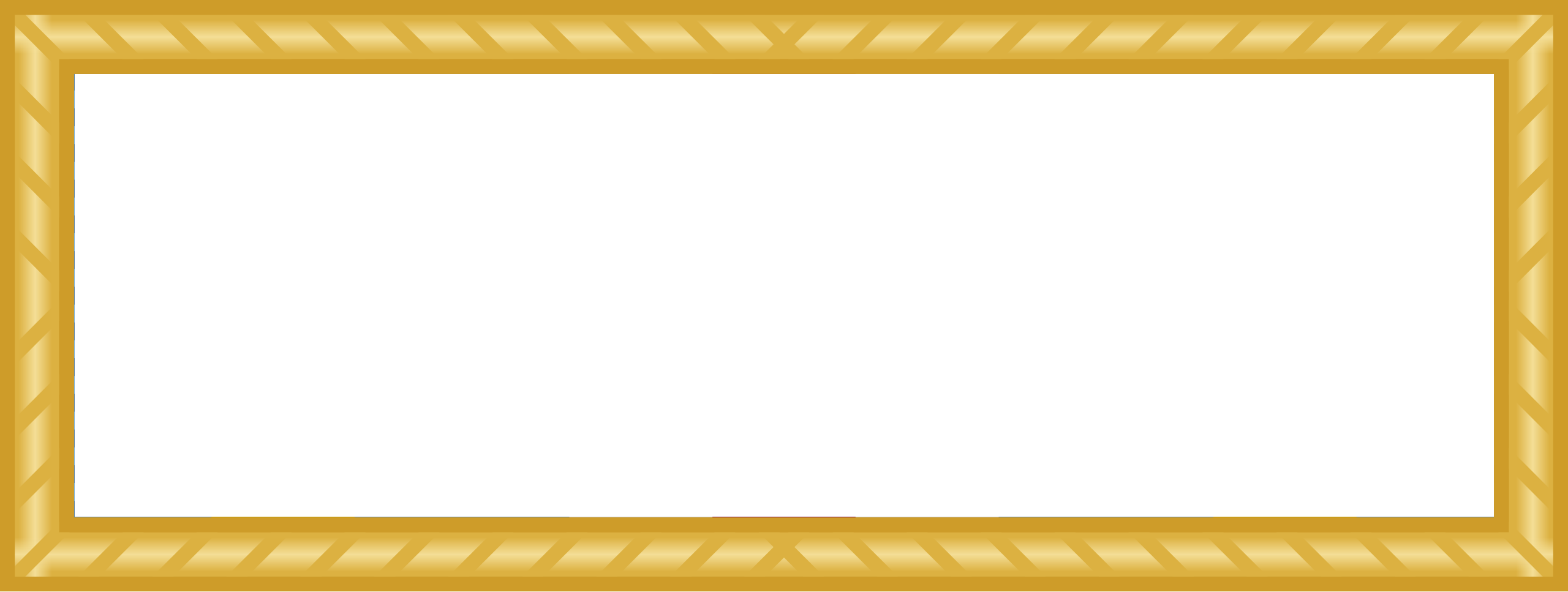
- US Army Gold Frame (above); US Air Force / DHS / USPHS / Transportation (below)
- Type: Ribbon Device
- Sponsored by: United States Army Department of Homeland Security; Department of Defense; United States Public Health Service Commissioned Corps Department of Transportation
- Status: Currently Awarded
- Established: 1941

=== Air Force ===
The U.S. Air Force called the attachment a Gold Border and uses the wider version of the attachment. The emblems are a consistent 1 7/16 inches wide and 7/16 inches tall with a gold frame that is 1/16 inch of laurel leaves. Use of the border shows the ribbon was awarded to individuals who were engaged in conducting or supporting combat operations in a designated combat zone; without indicates a non-combat area only in the case of the AFESR.

Air and Space Expeditionary Service Ribbon (May be issued without gold border)
Presidential Unit Citation (Version may be issued without gold border)

=== Army ===
The U.S. Army only uses the Gold frame attachment for unit awards in active service, reserve, national guard and state forces. The emblems are a consistent 1 7/16 inches wide and 9/16 inches tall with a gold frame that is 1/16 inch of laurel leaves.

Presidential Unit Citation
Valorous Unit Award (Army)
Meritorious Unit Commendation (Army)
Superior Unit Award (Army)

=== Homeland Security ===
DHS Outstanding Unit Award

=== Joint Service Awards ===
Joint Meritorious Unit Award

=== Public Health Service ===
Presidential Unit Citation (Public Health Service; A gold frame indicates a second award)

=== Transportation Department ===
Secretary of Transportation Outstanding Unit Award (USCG; now obsolete)

=== National Guard and State Guard Forces ===
State Guard Association of the United States Superior Unit Citation
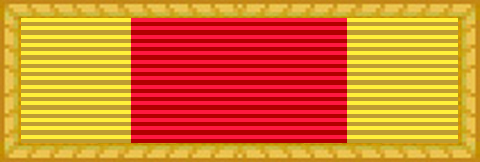
Military Emergency Management Specialist Academy Unit Citation
Alabama State Defense Force Outstanding Unit Commendation
Alaska Governors Distinguished Unit Citation
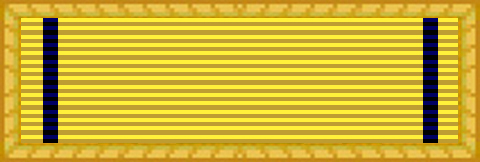
California Governor's Outstanding Unit Citation
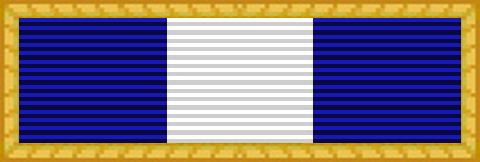
California Commanding General's Meritorious Unit Citation
California State Military Reserve Governor's Outstanding Unit Citation
Delaware National Guard Governor's Meritorious Unit Award
Delaware National Guard Unit Strength Award
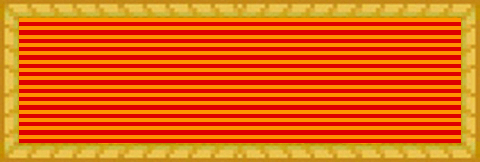
Florida Governor's Meritorious Unit Citation
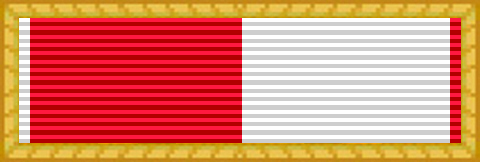
Georgia Distinguished Unit Ribbon
Georgia State Defense Force Outstanding Unit Citation
Idaho Governor's Outstanding Unit Citation
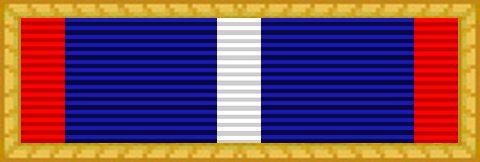
Idaho Adjutant General's Excellence Award
Indiana Guard Reserve Superior Unit Citation
Iowa Outstanding Unit Award
Louisiana F.E. Herbert Meritorious Unit Commendation
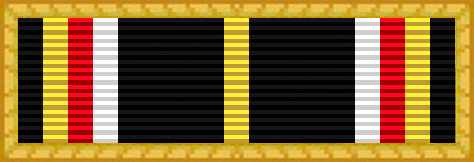
Maryland Adjutant General's Special Recognition Ribbon
Massachusetts Meritorious Unit Citation
Mississippi State Guard Outstanding Unit Citation
Nevada Governor's Outstanding Unit Award
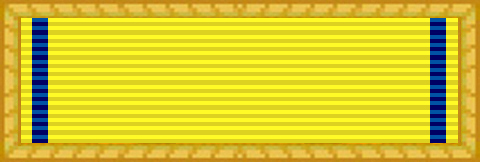
New Jersey Governor's Unit Award
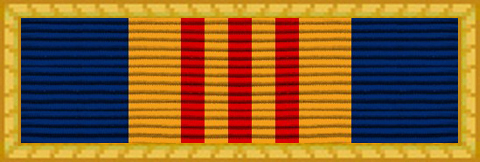
New Jersey Unit Strength Award
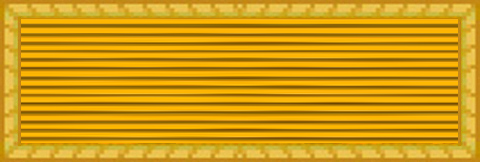
New Mexico Outstanding Unit Citation
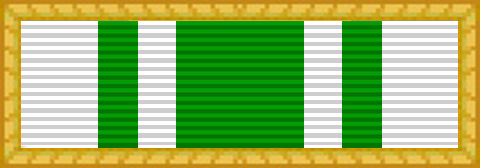
New York Guard Commander's Citation
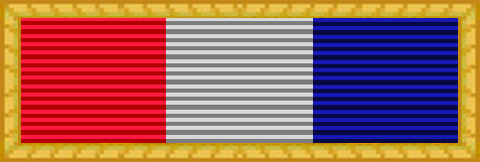
North Carolina Governor's Unit Citation
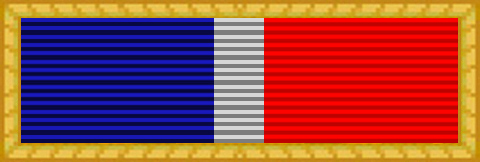
North Carolina Meritorious Unit Citation
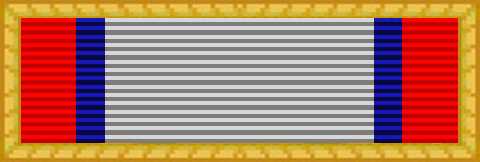
North Carolina Outstanding Unit Award
North Dakota State Outstanding Unit Citation
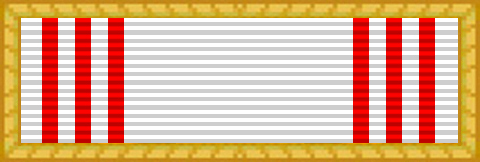
North Dakota Governor's Outstanding Unit Citation
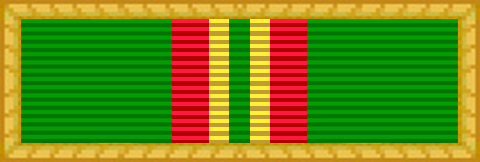
Ohio Military Reserve Commanding General's Meritorious Unit Service Award
Oklahoma Governor's Distinguished Unit Award
Oklahoma Commander’s Trophy Award Ribbon
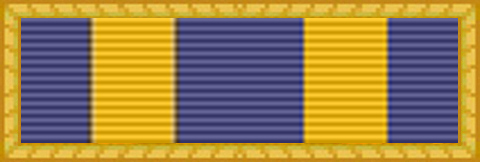
Oregon Superior Unit Ribbon
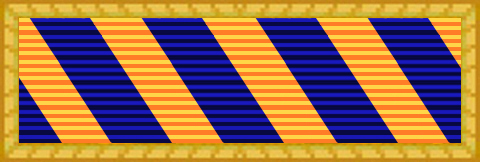
Pennsylvania Governor's Unit Citation
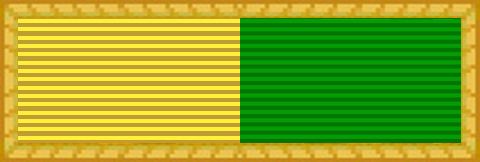
Rhode Island Gubernatorial Unit Award
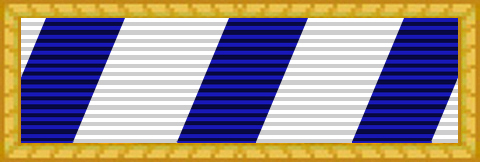
South Carolina Governor's Unit Citation
South Carolina State Guard Outstanding Unit Citation
South Carolina State Guard Unit Achievement Award
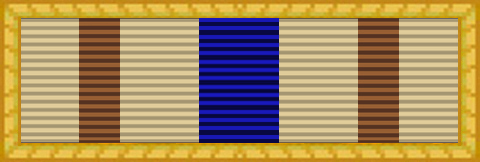
South Dakota Desert Storm Unit Citation
South Dakota Unit Citation
South Dakota Distinguished Unit Award
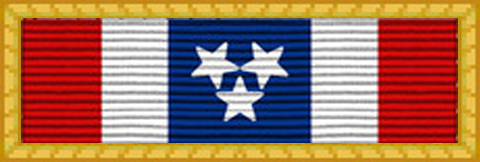
Tennessee Meritorious Unit Citation
Tennessee Distinguished Unit Citation
Tennessee Outstanding Unit Performance Commendation
Tennessee Volunteer Recruiting and Retention Unit Citation
Texas Governor's Unit Citation
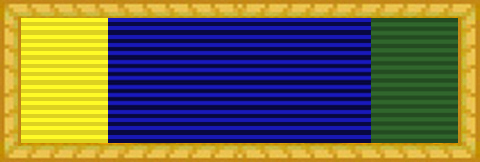
Texas Organizational Excellence Unit Award
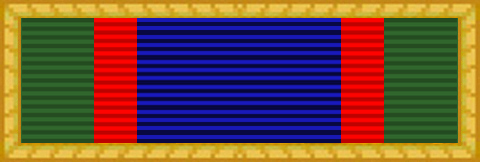
Texas State Guard Meritorious Unit Award
Virginia Defense Force Unit Readiness Citation (Dead Eye)
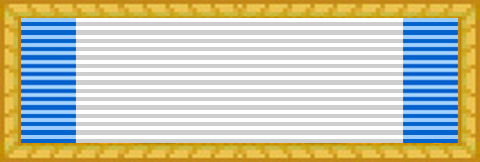
Washington Unit Citation
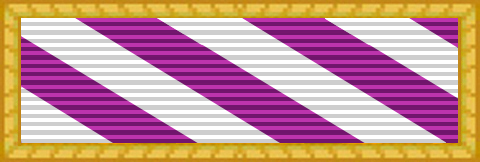
West Virginia Distinguished Unit Award

== See also ==
- Awards and decorations of the United States military
- Awards and decorations of the National Guard
- Authorized foreign decorations of the United States military
- United States military award devices
