= "C" device =

United States military award device

"C" Device
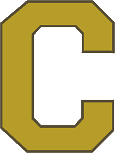
- Bronze "C" device
- Type: Ribbon device
- Awarded for: Meritorious service or achievement in a combat environment.
- Presented by: United States Armed Forces
- Status: Currently awarded
- Established: March 15, 2017

Precedence
- Next (higher): "V" device
- Next (lower): "R" device

The "C" Device, or "Combat Device", is a miniature bronze C that may be placed on certain individual awards of the United States Armed Forces to denote meritorious service or achievement while in combat. Being established on March 15, 2017, the "C" device is one of the newer military devices.

== Criteria ==
In order to receive the "C" device, a soldier must have done at least one of the following:

1. Engaged in action against an enemy of the United States;
2. Engaged in military operations involving conflict with an opposing foreign force; or
3. Served with friendly foreign forces engaged in an armed conflict against an opposing armed force in which the United States is not a belligerent party.

The awarding of this device is retroactive to 7 January 2016.

== Appearance ==
The appearance of the "C" device varies when an individual receives it multiple times (per award):

"C" Combat Devices
Bronze C	Silver C	Gold C	Bronze C with Wreath	Silver C with Wreath	Gold C with Wreath
1st Award	2nd Award	3rd Award	4th Award	5th Award	6th Award

== Authorized awards ==
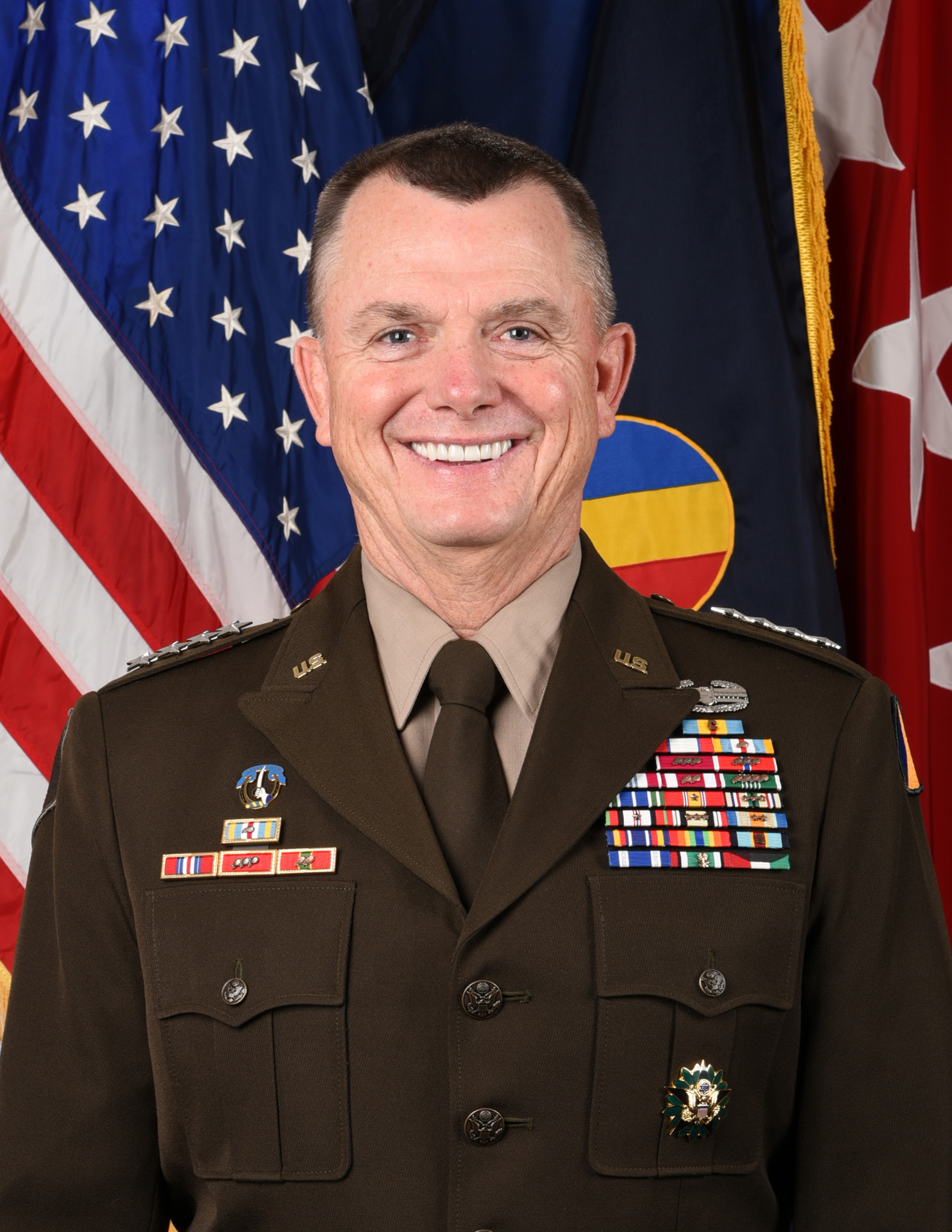
General Paul E. Funk II in 2019 wearing a Distinguished Service ribbon (top row) with "C" device.

The awards authorized to receive the device are, in order of precedence, as follows:

1. Distinguished Service Medal (Defense, Air & Space, Army and Navy & Marine Corps)
2. Defense Superior Service Medal
3. Legion of Merit
4. Distinguished Flying Cross
5. Air Medal
6. Commendation Medal (Joint, Army, Navy & Marine Corps, Air & Space and Coast Guard)
7. Achievement Medal (Joint, Army, Navy & Marine Corps, Air & Space and Coast Guard)

=== Gallery ===
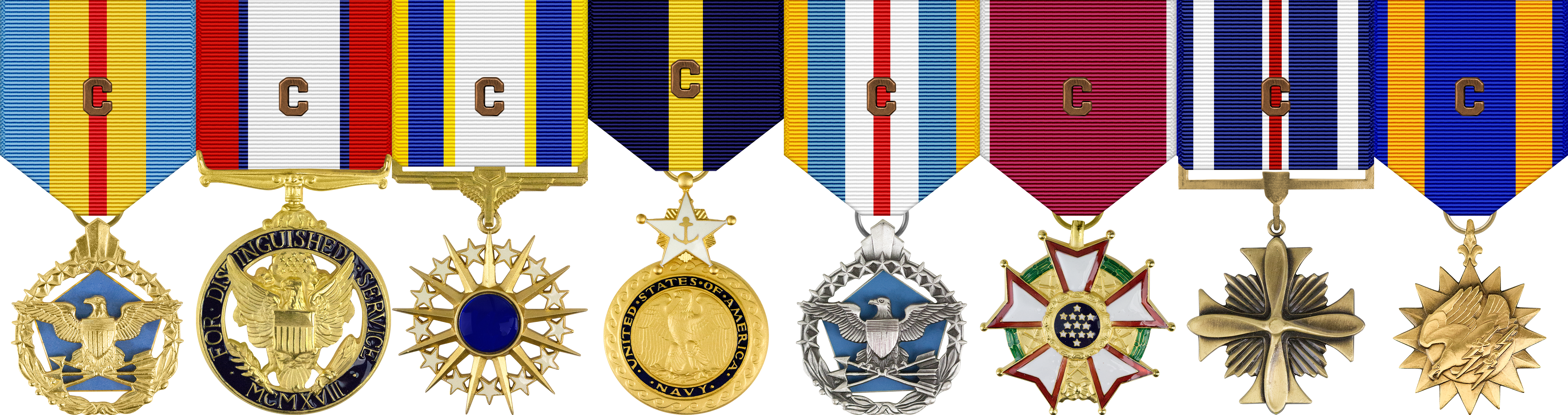

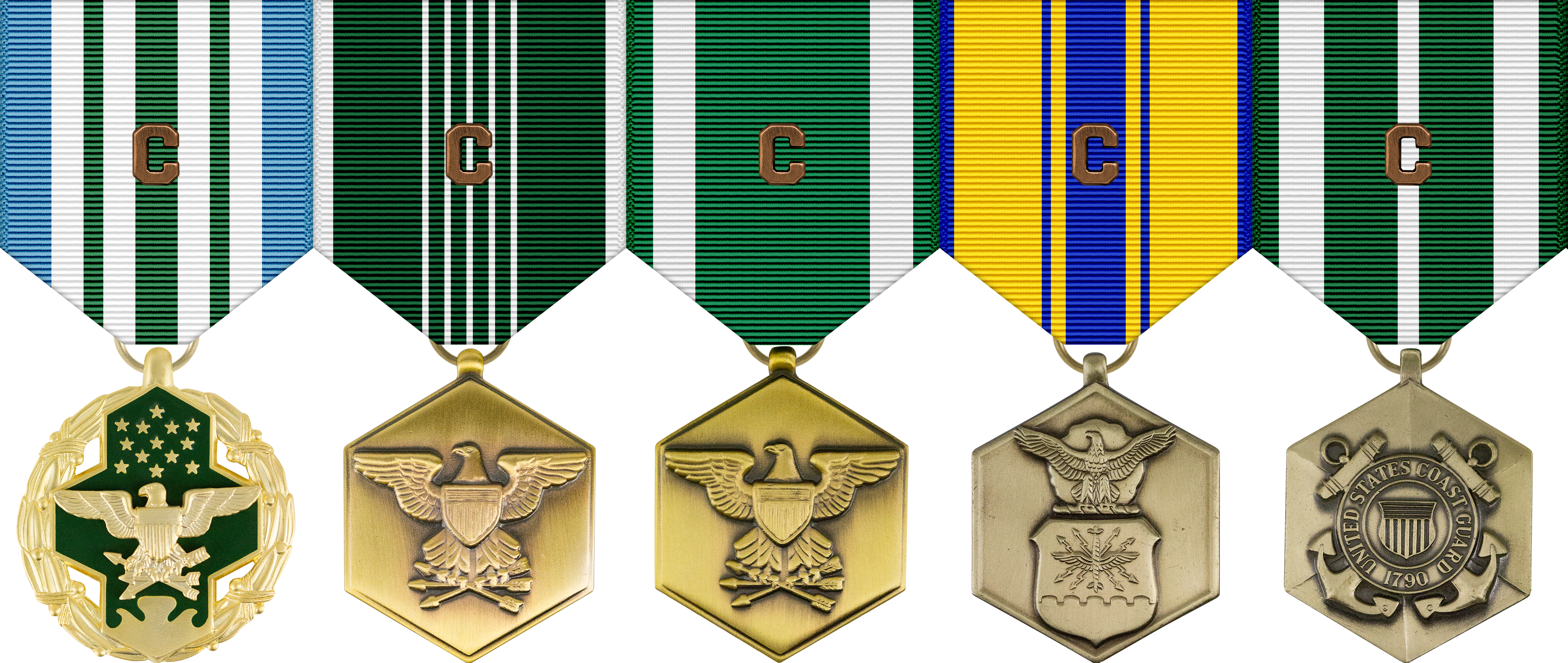

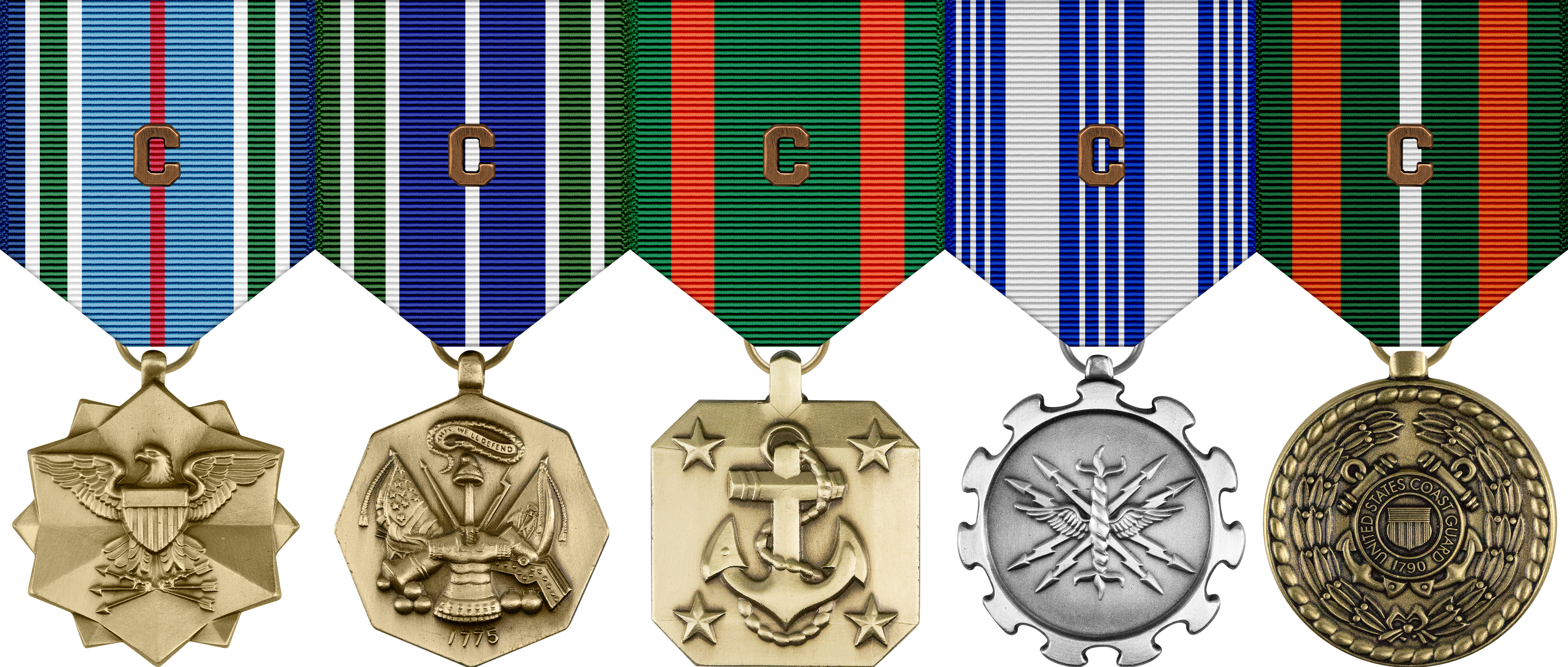

== See also ==
- United States military award devices
