= Navy Commendation Star =

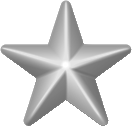
- Navy Commendation Star (3/16")
- Type: Personal Military Decoration
- Awarded for: Commendable performance of duty
- Presented by: the Department of the Navy
- Status: No longer awarded
- Established: 1918
- World War I Victory Medal Ribbon with one Navy Commendation Star

The Navy Commendation Star or Navy Letter of Commendation Star was a Department of the Navy personal military decoration issued as ribbon device which was authorized in 1918 to be "placed" on the World War I Victory Medal. A 3/16 inch silver star was issued to any service member of the Navy and Marine Corps who had been cited and commended by the Secretary of the Navy for performance of duty. Among the recipients of the Commendation Star was future Fleet Admiral Chester W. Nimitz.

The Navy Commendation Star was placed on the suspension and service ribbon of the World War I Victory Medal, above all battle clasps. When the star was worn on the medal's service ribbon, the star was placed before all bronze service stars. The Navy Commendation Star was identical to the United States Army Citation Star which also was a 3/16 inch silver star worn on the World War I Victory Medal to denote a soldier (or a marine or Navy corpsman attached to the Second Division), was cited for gallantry in action and awarded a citation. Unlike the Citation Star, however, the Navy Commendation Star could not be converted to the Silver Star Medal (1932).

At the start of the Second World War, the Navy Commendation Star was declared obsolete and none were issued between 1941 and 1945. In the 1950s, the Department of the Navy began accepting applications from eligible World War I veterans authorized a Navy Commendation Star for conversion to the Navy Commendation Ribbon with Metal Pendant, and in 1960, to the Navy Commendation Medal. In 1994, an authorized Navy Commendation Star could be exchanged for the Navy and Marine Corps Commendation Medal.

== See also ==
- United States military award devices
- Awards and decorations of the United States military
