= Presidential Unit Citation (United States) =

United States military award

- U.S. Army U.S. Navy and U.S. Marine Corps U.S. Air Force and U.S. Space Force U.S. Coast Guard U.S. Public Health Service
- Type: Ribbon (decoration)
- Awarded for: "Gallantry, determination, and esprit de corps in accomplishing its mission under extremely difficult and hazardous conditions."
- Presented by: United States Department of the Army; United States Department of the Navy; United States Department of the Air Force; United States Department of Homeland Security
- Eligibility: Military units
- Status: Currently awarded
- First award: 1941
- Streamers: Top; Army, Air Force, and Space Force; Middle; Navy and Marine Corps; Bottom; Coast Guard

Precedence
- Next (higher): Army: Army Achievement Medal; Naval Service: Combat Action Ribbon; Air and Space Forces: Combat Action Medal; Coast Guard: Coast Guard Combat Action Ribbon
- Individual equivalent: Distinguished Service Cross, Navy Cross, Air Force Cross, Coast Guard Cross
- Next (lower): Joint Meritorious Unit Award

The Presidential Unit Citation (PUC), originally called the Distinguished Unit Citation, is awarded to units of the uniformed services of the United States, and those of allied countries, for extraordinary heroism in action against an armed enemy on or after 7 December 1941 (the date of the attack on Pearl Harbor and the start of American involvement in World War II). The unit must display such gallantry, determination, and esprit de corps in accomplishing its mission under extremely difficult and hazardous conditions so as to set it apart from and above other units participating in the same campaign.

Since its inception by President Franklin D. Roosevelt with the signing of Executive Order 9075 on 26 February 1942, retroactive to 7 December 1941, to 2008, the Presidential Unit Citation has been awarded in conflicts such as World War II, the Korean War, the Vietnam War, Iraq War, and the war in Afghanistan.

The collective degree of valor (combat heroism) against an armed enemy by the unit nominated for the PUC is the same as that which would warrant award of the individual award of the Distinguished Service Cross, Air Force Cross or Navy Cross. In some cases, one or more individuals within the unit may have also been awarded individual awards for their contribution to the actions for which their entire unit was awarded a Presidential Unit Citation. The units with the most Presidential Unit Citations are submarine USS Parche (SSN-683) and the 1st Marine Division, both with nine citations.

== Creation and official format ==
=== Army, Air Force, and Space Force ===
The Army citation was established by Executive Order 9075 on 26 February 1942, superseded by Executive Order 9396 on 2 December 1943, which authorized the Distinguished Unit Citation. As with other Army unit citations, the PUC is in a larger frame than other ribbons, and is worn above the right pocket. All members of the unit may wear the decoration, whether or not they personally participated in the acts for which the unit was cited; only those members assigned to the unit at the time of the action cited may wear the decoration as a permanent award. For both the Army, Air Force, and Space Force the emblem is a solid blue ribbon enclosed in a gold frame.

The Air and Space Forces PUC was adopted from the Army Distinguished Unit Citation after the Air Force became a separate military branch in 1947. By Executive Order 10694, dated Jan. 10, 1957 the Department of the Air Force redesignated the Distinguished Unit Citation as the Presidential Unit Citation. The Air and Space Forces PUC is the same color and design as the Army PUC but slightly smaller, so that it can be worn in alignment with other Air Force and Space Force ribbons on the left pocket following personal awards. As with the Army, all members of a receiving unit may wear the decoration while assigned to it, but only those assigned to the unit at the time of the action cited may wear the decoration as a permanent award; or if any member of a receiving unit had it at their last duty station prior to being either discharged or retired, they may continue to wear the decoration as prescribed.

The Citation is carried on the receiving unit's colors in the form of a blue streamer, 4 ft (1.2 m) long and 2.75 in (7.0 cm) wide. For the Army, only on rare occasions will a unit larger than battalion qualify for award of this decoration.

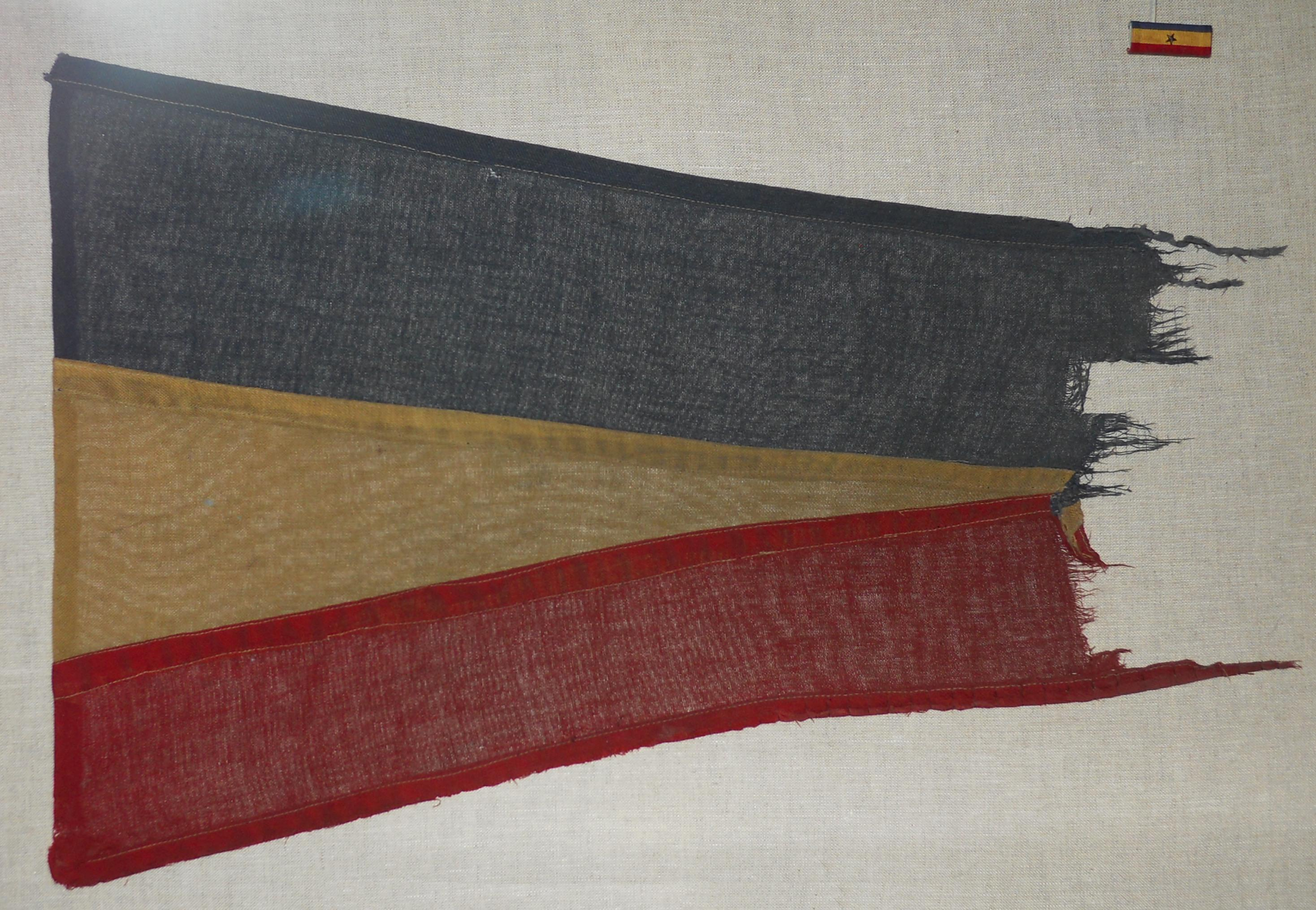
Navy Presidential Unit Citation pennant and ribbon awarded 1944 to Task Group 22.3.

=== Navy and Marine Corps ===
Citations "to Naval and Marine Corps Units for Outstanding Performance in Action" was established by Executive Order 9050 on 6 February 1942.

The Navy version has navy blue, yellow, and red horizontal stripes, and is the only Navy ribbon having horizontal stripes. To distinguish between the two versions of the Presidential Unit Citation, the Navy version which is more often referred to simply as the Presidential Unit Citation, is referred to as the Navy Presidential Unit Citation and sometimes as the "Navy and Marine Corps Presidential Unit Citation". The ribbon is worn by only by those Navy and Marine service members who were assigned to the unit for the "award period" of the award. In the Army, those who join the unit after the "award period" may also wear it while assigned to the unit. ALNan 137–43 states that the first award has a blue enameled star on the ribbon and additional stars for subsequent awards. In 1945, the Secretary of the Navy wrote the Iwo Jima PUC without the line "and all those attached to or serving with". In 1949, the award was changed with no star for the first award and bronze stars for subsequent awards.

==== Special clasps ====
===== USS Nautilus (SSN-571) =====
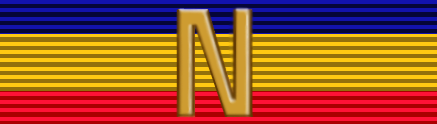

To commemorate the first submerged voyage under the North Pole by the nuclear-powered submarine USS Nautilus (SSN-571) in 1958, all members of her crew who made that voyage were authorized to wear their Presidential Unit Citation ribbon with a special clasp in the form of a gold block letter N. U.S. Navy sailors assigned to the USS Nautilus memorial at the Submarine Force Museum in Groton, Connecticut, are permitted to wear the Navy Presidential Unit Citation with "N" device while serving there.

As of 2014, the same device may be awarded for the Nuclear Deterrence Operations Service Medal for those personnel who work in direct support of ICBM operations who serve 179 non-consecutive days dispatched to a missile complex.

===== USS Triton (SSRN-586) =====
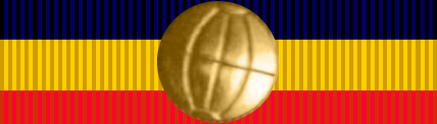

To commemorate the first submerged circumnavigation of the world by the nuclear-powered submarine Triton during its shakedown cruise in 1960, all members of her crew who made that voyage were authorized to wear their Presidential Unit Citation ribbon with a special clasp in the form of a golden replica of the globe.

=== Coast Guard ===
United States Coast Guard units may be awarded either the Navy or Coast Guard version of the Presidential Unit Citation, depending on which service the Coast Guard was supporting when the citation action was performed.

The current decoration is known as the "Department of Homeland Security Presidential Unit Citation". The original Coast Guard Presidential Unit Citation was established under the authority of Executive Order 10694 (signed by President Dwight D. Eisenhower on January 10, 1957), and amended by Section 74 of Executive Order 13286 (signed by President George W. Bush on February 28, 2003) to transfer the award of the USCG PUC to the Secretary of Homeland Security.

==== Special clasp ====
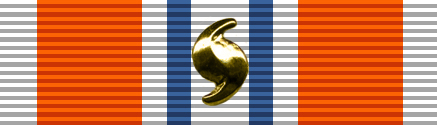

A Coast Guard version of the award was awarded to all U.S. Coast Guard and Coast Guard Auxiliary personnel by President George W. Bush for rescue and relief operations in response to Hurricane Katrina from 29 August 2005 to 13 September 2005. All who received the award for responding to Hurricane Katrina are authorized to wear the Presidential Unit Citation ribbon with a special clasp in the form of the internationally recognized hurricane symbol.

=== U.S. Public Health Service Commissioned Corps ===

The United States Public Health Service Presidential Citation was established in 2015. The design was finalized by the Army Institute of Heraldry on 17 August 2015. On 24 September 2015, President Barack Obama presented the Presidential Unit Citation to the officers of the United States Public Health Service Commissioned Corps for the 2013–2016 Ebola epidemic in West Africa and the United States. On 19 January 2021, President Donald Trump presented the citation to all Commissioned Corps officers serving from 2020 to 2021, for their extraordinary performance of duty during the COVID-19 pandemic. A gold frame is placed around the Presidential Unit Citation ribbon to indicate a second award.

== See also ==
- Awards and decorations of the United States military
- Non-US recipients of US gallantry awards
- Philippine Republic Presidential Unit Citation
- Republic of Korea Presidential Unit Citation
- United States military award devices
- Vietnam Presidential Unit Citation
- United States military award devices
