= "R" device =

United States military award device

"R" Device
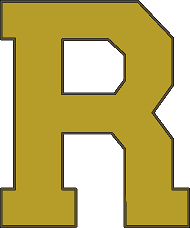
- Type: Ribbon device
- Awarded for: Achievement in remote combat operations
- Sponsored by: United States Armed Forces
- Status: Currently awarded
- Established: March 15, 2017

Precedence
- Next (higher): "C" device

The "R" Device, or "Remote Impact Device", is a miniature bronze R that may be placed on certain individual awards of the United States Armed Forces to denote remote employment of a weapons systems that has a direct impact on a combat operation. Being established on March 15, 2017, the "R" device is one of the newer military devices. The "R" Device replaced the earlier effort by Secretary of Defense Leon E. Panetta to create the Distinguished Warfare Medal in 2013.

The Navy awarded its first "R" devices to two unmanned aerial system (UAS) operators in 2017 from the Marine Unmanned Aerial Vehicle Squadron 3 (VMU-3) based at Marine Corps Air Station Kaneohe Bay, Hawaii. The Air Force awarded that service's first "R" devices in 2018 to five airmen from the 432nd Air Expeditionary Wing at Creech Air Force Base, Nevada.

== Criteria ==
=== Air Force ===
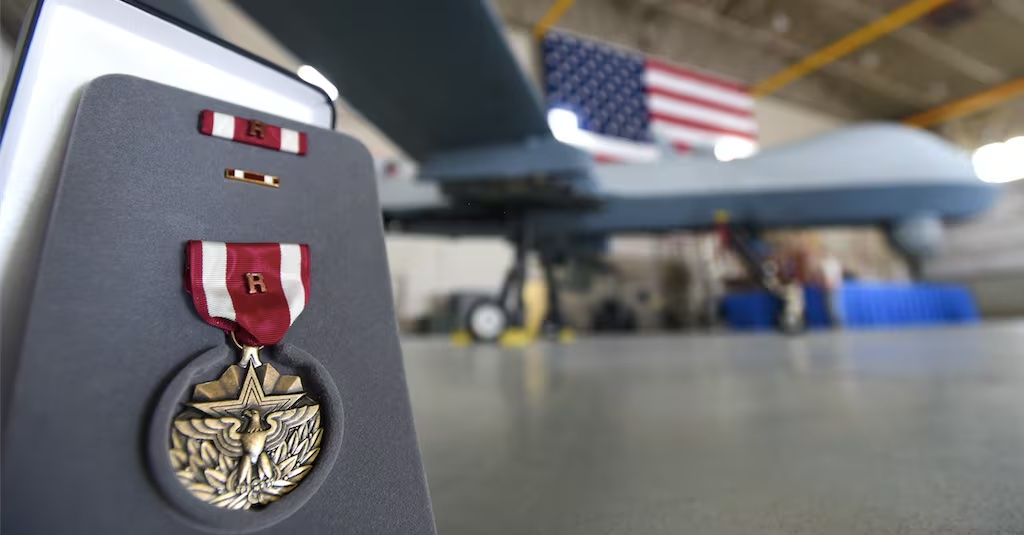
A Meritorious Service Medal with "R" device

The device may be awarded to Airmen who served in the following career fields: remotely piloted aircraft; cyber; space; or intelligence, surveillance, and reconnaissance.

- The "R" device is only authorized for a specific achievement
- Recognition for direct and immediate impact shall be based on the merit of the individual's actions, the basic criteria of the decoration, and the "R" device criteria
- The act must have been: performed in a manner significantly above that normally expected and sufficient to distinguish the individual above members performing similar acts
- A decoration should only be recommended in cases where the event clearly merits special recognition of the action

The "R" device may only be placed on the Legion of Merit, Meritorious Service Medal, Air and Space Force Commendation Medal and Air and Space Force Achievement Medal.

=== Army ===
The device may be awarded to a soldier when they remotely, but directly, contributed to a combat operation. The "R" device is part of the "commander's program" to give the command discretion to interpret the appropriateness of an award.

A qualifying action for the device; the soldier must be:

- Engaged in military operations against an enemy of the United States;
- Engaged in military operations involving conflict against an opposing foreign force; or
- Serving with friendly foreign forces engaged in military operations with an opposing armed force in which the United States is not a belligerent party.

Examples of remote weapons systems include:

- Unmanned Aerial Vehicle (UAV) weapon-systems
- Activities that mitigate or disrupt adversary anti-access/area denial (A2/AD) capabilities including cyber
- Terminal High Altitude Area Defense (THAAD) operations.

The "R" device may only be placed on the Legion of Merit, Meritorious Service Medal, Army Commendation Medal and Army Achievement Medal.

=== Joint Service ===
The device may be awarded to a military service member to recognize hands-on employment of a weapon system or other remote war-fighting system with direct and immediate impact on an operation. A qualifying action for the device; the service member must be:

- Engaged in military operations against an enemy of the United States;
- Engaged in military operations involving conflict against an opposing foreign force; or
- Serving with friendly foreign forces engaged in military operations with an opposing armed force in which the United States is not a belligerent party.

The "R" device can be placed on the Defense Superior Service Medal, Defense Meritorious Service Medal, Joint Service Commendation Medal and Joint Service Achievement Medal.

=== Navy and Marine Corps ===
The device may be awarded to a sailor or marine to provide distinctive recognition of personnel whose actions deliver significant effects on the enemy, or have direct impact on friendly forces - when the physical location is outside of enemy threats and keeps them from receiving other awards or devices.

Examples of remote weapons systems include:

- Unmanned aerial vehicle weapon system strikes.
- Ship-to-shore or surface-to-surface weapon system strikes.
- Remote piloting of an aircraft providing direct and immediate real-time support vital to the success of forces engaged in combat or other operations.
- Active cyberwarfare that disrupts the adversary's capabilities or actions.
- Surface-to-air engagement that disrupts or denies enemy attack on or surveillance of friendly forces.
- Personally exercising real-time tactical control of a raid or other combat mission from a location not exposed to hostile action.

The "R" device may only be placed on the Legion of Merit, Meritorious Service Medal, Navy and Marine Corps Commendation Medal and Navy and Marine Corps Achievement Medal.

== Appearance ==
The appearance of the "R" device varies when an individual receives it multiple times (per award):

"R" Remote Impact Devices
Bronze R	Silver R	Gold R	Bronze R with Wreath	Silver R with Wreath	Gold R with Wreath
1st Award	2nd Award	3rd Award	4th Award	5th Award	6th Award

== Authorized awards ==
The awards authorized to receive the device vary by service branch and are noted in each of the above sections.

=== Gallery ===
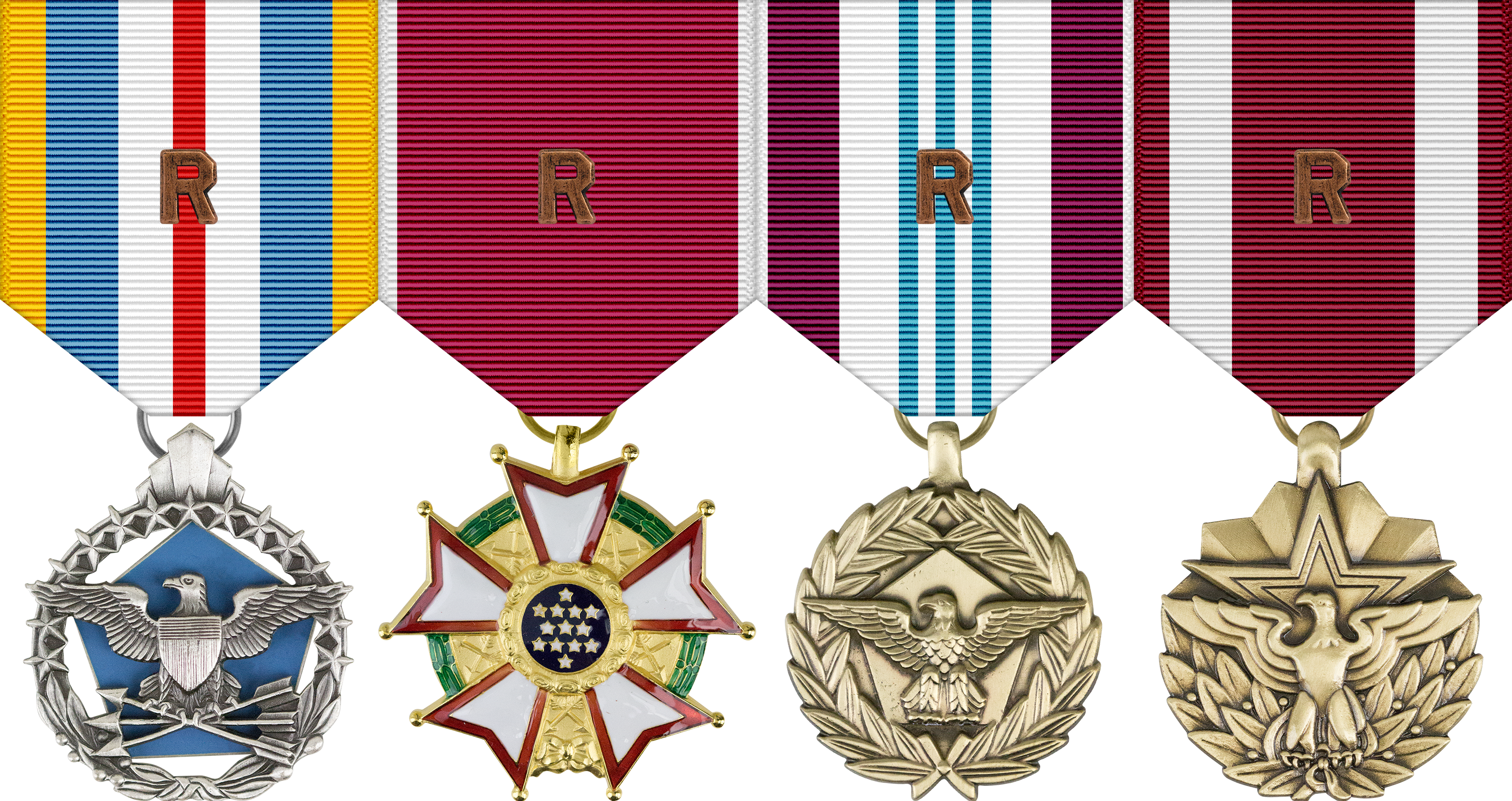

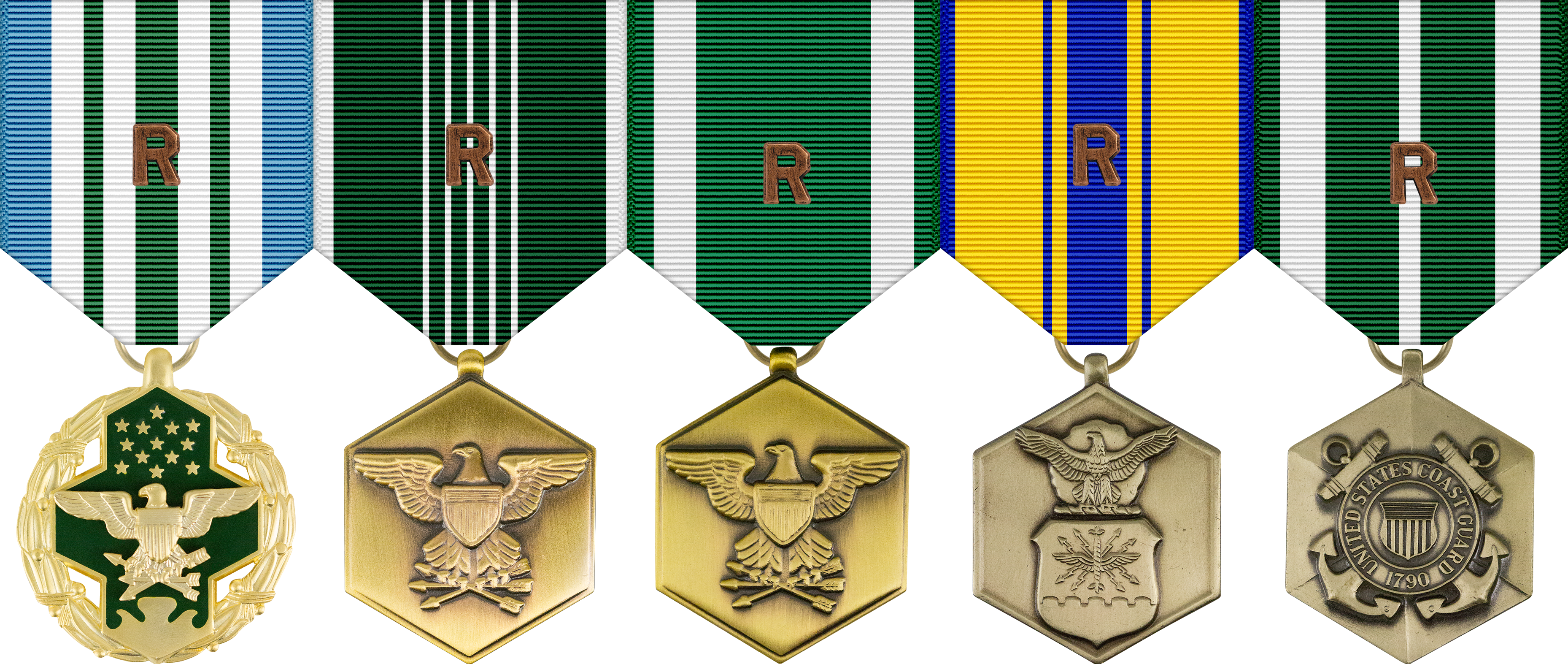

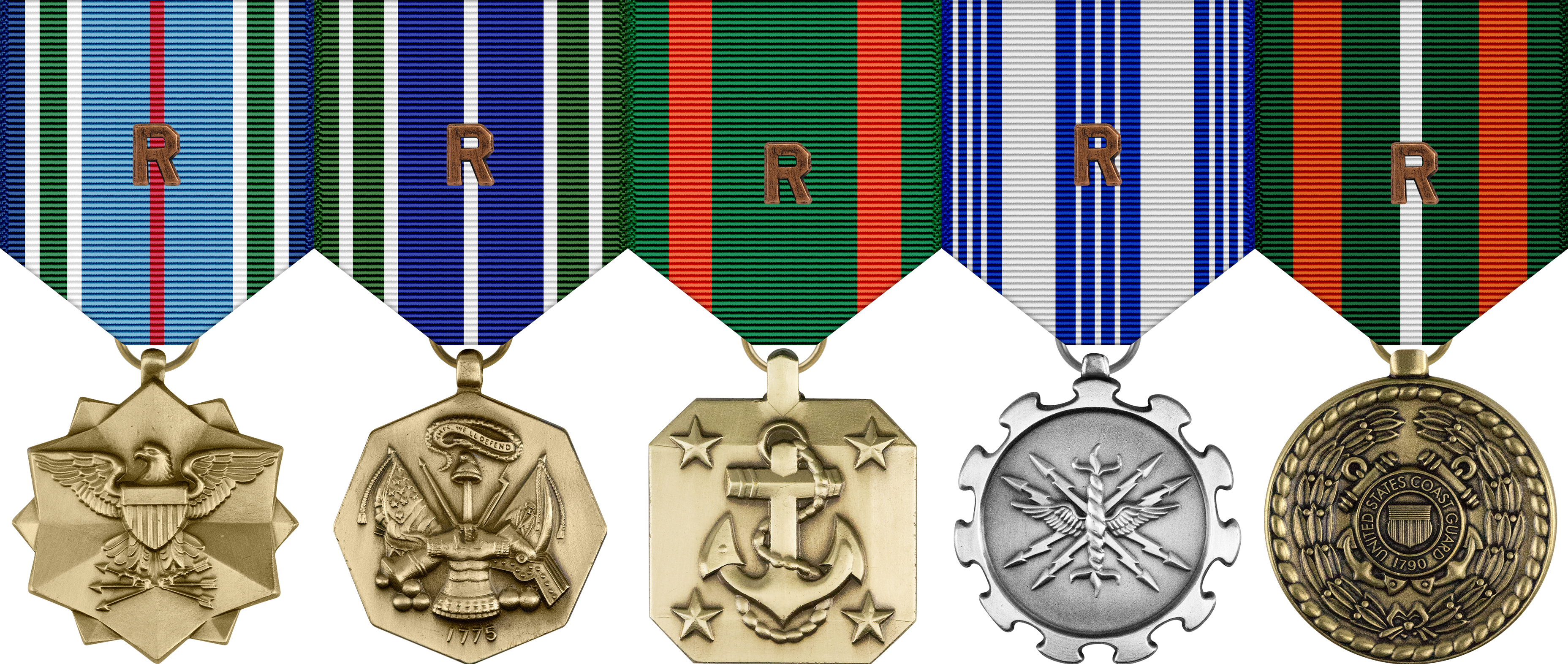

== See also ==
- United States military award devices
