= Adjutant General's Special Recognition Ribbon =

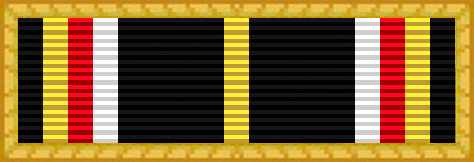

The Adjutant General’s Distinguished Unit Ribbon, formerly the Maryland National Guard Adjutant General's Distinguished Unit Ribbon, is intended to recognize units or members of the military in Maryland who have performed acts to greatly benefit the Maryland Military Department or the state. Any member of the military is eligible regardless of time of service. This ribbon is only bestowed on organizational units that are not numbered.

Formerly, the ribbon was given to units of Maryland National Guard who performed superior service during times of war or state of emergency or when otherwise acting to further state interests.
