= United States military award devices =

Additions to US military medals and ribbons

The United States Armed Forces authorize certain medal and ribbon devices that may be worn if authorized on a defined set of United States military decorations and awards. The devices vary between 3/16 inch to 13/32 inch in size and are usually attached to suspension and service ribbons of medals and to unit award ribbons. The devices are usually made of brass or metal alloys that appear gold, silver, or bronze in color with either a dull or polished look. The devices may denote additional awards of the same decoration or award, an award for valor or meritorious combat service, participation in a particular campaign, periods of honorable service, specific events, and other special meanings. These are sometimes referred to as award devices, but are most commonly referred to in service regulations and Department of Defense instructions simply as "devices" for awards and decorations.

On January 7, 2016, the Secretary of Defense approved two new devices for medals and ribbons: a "C" Device which will be affixed to multi-purpose performance awards in recognition of meritorious service under combat conditions and, an "R" Device which will be affixed to non-combat performance awards to specifically recognize remote but direct impact on combat operations. The "R" device is to be a bronze letter "R", 1/4 inch in size. Both of the devices will be worn if authorized for wear, on specific decorations. The services have a year to implement these changes.

The following is a list of U.S. military service devices for medals and ribbons:

- 5/16 inch star (gold or silver)
- "A" Device
- Arrowhead device
- Berlin Airlift Device (Cold War, 1947–1948)
- Battle star (3/16"), bronze or silver
- "C" device (1/4")
- Campaign clasp
- Campaign star (3/16"), bronze or silver
- Citation Star (3/16"), WW I, "Silver Star"
- "E" device (Navy)
- Enlistment Bar
- Fleet Marine Force Combat Operation Insignia
- Globe Device
- Gold frame
- Good Conduct Loop
- Hourglass Device
- Hurricane Device
- Marksmanship Device
- Maltese Cross
- "M" Device
- "N" Device (Navy)
- "N" Device (Air Force)
- Navy Commendation Star (3/16)", WW I, silver
- Numeral device
- Oak leaf cluster (5/16" or 13/32"), bronze or silver
- Operational Distinguishing Device
- "R" device (1/4")
- Service star (3/16"), bronze, silver and gold
- Strike/Flight numerals
- "V" device
- Wintered Over Device
- Wake Island Device (World War II)

== Examples of service ribbons with devices ==
The following are examples of various devices affixed to different service ribbons:

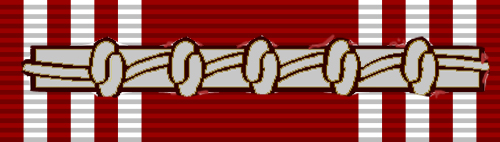
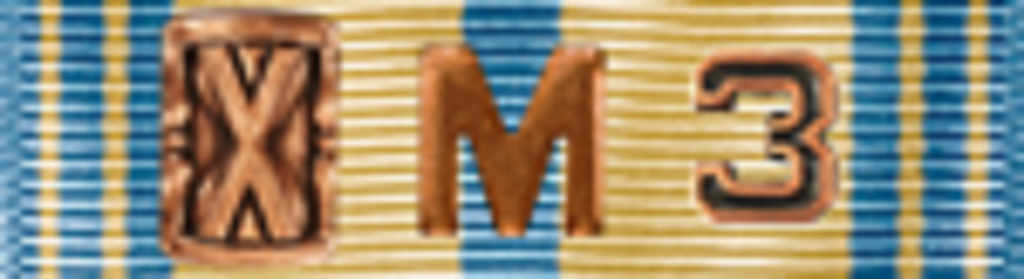
Legion of Merit with "C" device
Distinguished Flying Cross with one silver and two bronze Oak Leaf Clusters indicating a total of eight awards
Bronze Star Medal with bronze "V" Device
Meritorious Service Medal with "R" device
Air Medal, five awards, of which four were for valor, and bronze Strike/Flight numeral 3 (Navy and Marine Corps)
Air Medal, five awards, of which one was for valor, one for combat, and one for remote
Coast Guard Achievement Medal with one silver and two gold 5/16 inch stars indicating a total of eight awards
Army Good Conduct Medal (10 awards)
Armed Forces Expeditionary Medal with Fleet Marine Force Combat Operation Insignia and one silver 3/16 inch Service Star indicating a total of six awards
Vietnam Service Medal with Arrowhead Device indicating at least one combat jump/amphibious assault and two bronze 3/16 inch Campaign Stars
Nuclear Deterrence Operations Service Medal with "N" Device
Air Force Overseas Short Tour Service Ribbon with Arctic Device
Armed Forces Reserve Medal with bronze Hourglass Device for ten years of service, "M" Device for mobilization, and "3" Numeral Device indicating three mobilizations
Air Force Expeditionary Service Ribbon with gold frame
World War I Victory Medal with bronze Maltese cross (for Marines fighting in France and not eligible for a battle clasp, also for parts of Navy Medical Corps)
American Defense Service Medal with Atlantic device
Army of Occupation Medal with Berlin Airlift Device
Coast Guard Distinguished Marksman Award for Rifle
Coast Guard Silver Pistol Shot Excellence-In-Competition Award
Coast Guard Bronze Rifle Excellence-In-Competition Award
Coast Guard Pistol Marksmanship Medal (a Coast Guard Pistol Marksmanship Ribbon with silver Expert Device)
Navy Rifle Marksmanship Ribbon with bronze Sharpshooter Device
Missouri National Guard Governors Twelve Ribbon with three hawthorn clusters

Unit awards

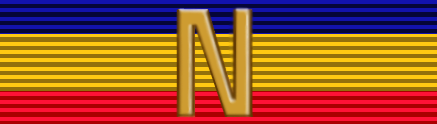
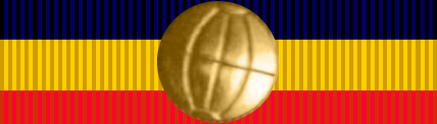
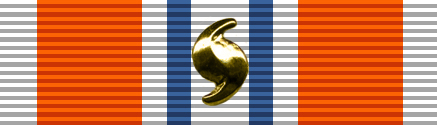
Navy E Ribbon with silver wreathed E device (four or more awards)
Navy Presidential Unit Citation with Nautilus device
Navy Presidential Unit Citation with Globe device
Coast Guard Presidential Unit Citation with Hurricane Device
Coast Guard Unit Commendation with Operational Distinguishing Device
