= Air Medal =

Military decoration of the United States Military

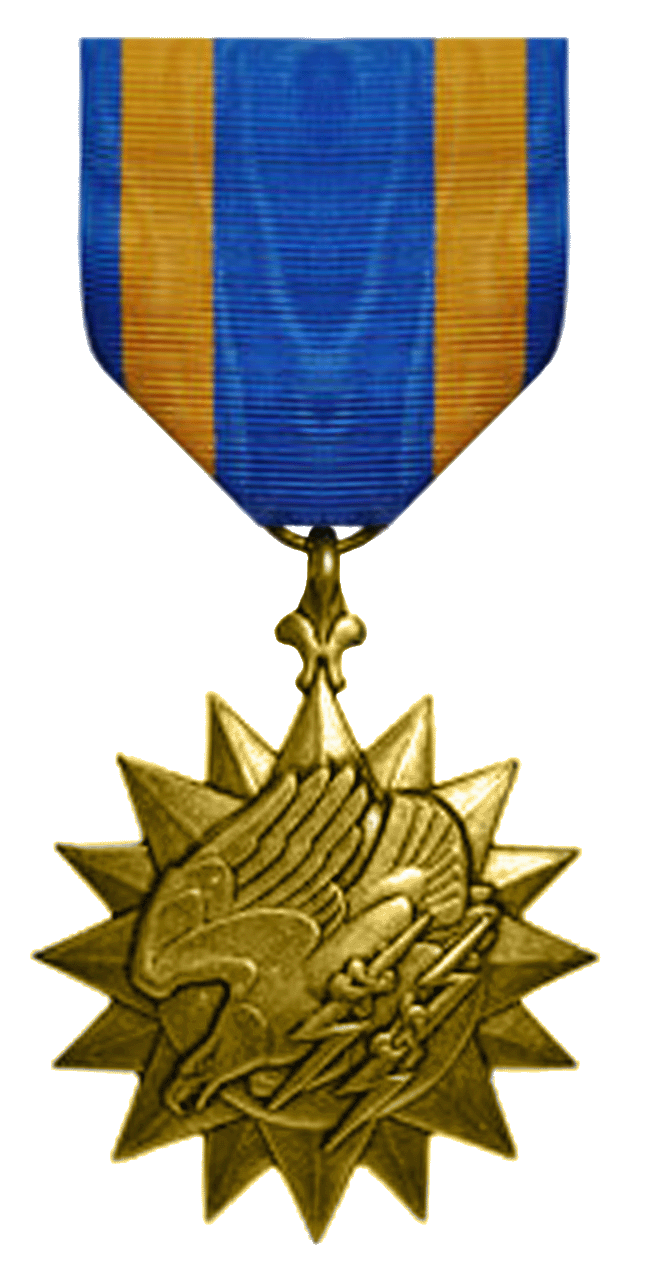
- Type: Military medal
- Awarded for: Heroic or meritorious achievement while participating in aerial flight
- Presented by: United States Department of the Army; United States Department of the Navy; United States Department of the Air Force; United States Department of Homeland Security
- Status: Currently awarded
- Established: Executive Order 9158, May 11, 1942 (as amended by E.O. 9242-A, September 11, 1942)
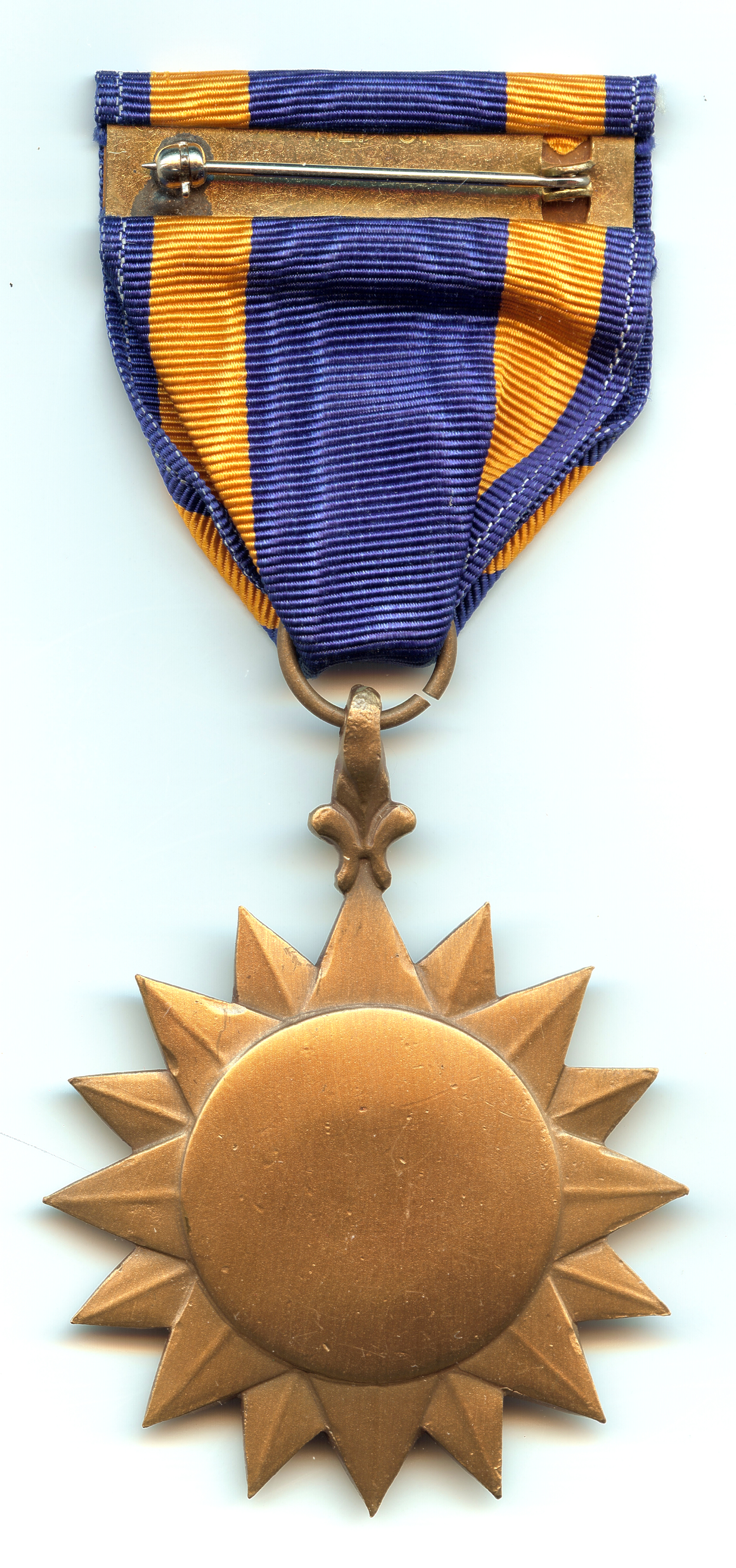
- Service ribbon (above); reverse of medal (below)

Precedence
- Next (higher): Meritorious Service Medal
- Next (lower): Army, Naval Service, and Coast Guard: Joint Service Commendation Medal; Air and Space Forces: Aerial Achievement Medal

The Air Medal (AM) is a military decoration of the United States Armed Forces. It was created in 1942 and is awarded for single acts of heroism or meritorious achievement while participating in aerial flight.

== Criteria ==
The Air Medal was established by Executive Order 9158, signed by Franklin D. Roosevelt on May 11, 1942. It was awarded retroactive to September 8, 1939, to anyone who distinguishes himself by meritorious achievement while serving with the Armed Forces in aerial flight.

The original award criteria set by an Army Policy Letter dated September 25, 1942, were for one award of the Air Medal:

- per each naval vessel or three enemy aircraft in flight confirmed destroyed. An entire aircrew would be credited for the destruction of a ship, but only the pilot or gunner responsible would be credited for destroying an enemy aircraft.
- per 25 operational flights during which exposure to enemy fire is expected.
- per 100 operational flights during which exposure to enemy fire is not expected.

These criteria were altered by the commanding generals of each numbered Air Force to fit the conditions of their theater of operations and to maintain morale. The Distinguished Flying Cross would usually be awarded for roughly twice to five times the requirements of the Air Medal. This led to automatic "score card" awards of the Air Medal and Distinguished Flying Cross for completing a set number of operational missions rather than distinguished service, meritorious action, or bravery, as had been intended. On August 5, 1943, such score card awards were officially abolished by a Headquarters Army Air Forces Awards Board memorandum due to the embarrassment when airmen received the Air Medal for "score carding" five missions or more but were later removed from flying duties for "lack of moral fibre". Commanders could still issue the awards on those grounds, but the recipient must perform exceptional or meritorious service as well.

=== Army Air Forces (1942–1947) ===
During World War II, the medal's award criteria varied widely depending on the theater of operations, the aircraft flown, and the missions accomplished. In Europe, the airspace was considered completely controlled by the enemy and heavy air defenses were encountered, so the criteria were altered from those of the original medal. Bomber, photographic reconnaissance, or observation crewmembers and air transport pilots received it for five sorties, fighter pilots received it for ten sorties, and individual pilots or air crewmen received one award per enemy aircraft shot down. Elsewhere in the Pacific and the China Burma India Theater, the pilots and crews flew mostly over uncontrolled or contested airspace for long hours and lighter air defenses were encountered, so much higher criteria were used. Anti-submarine patrols from the United States could qualify for the medal if an airman logged 200 hours of flight time.

=== Air Force (1947–present) ===
The Air Medal may be awarded to recognize either single acts of merit or gallantry in combat or for meritorious service in a combat zone. Award of the Air Medal is primarily intended to recognize those personnel who are on current crew member or non-crew member flying status which requires them to participate in aerial flight on a regular and frequent basis in the performance of their primary duties. However, it may also be awarded to certain other individuals whose combat duties require regular and frequent flying in other than a passenger status, or individuals who perform a particularly noteworthy act while performing the function of a crew member but who are not on flying status. These individuals must make a discernible contribution to the operational land combat mission or to the mission of the aircraft in flight.

Examples of personnel whose combat duties require them to fly include those in the attack elements of units involved in air-land assaults against an armed enemy and those directly involved in airborne command and control of combat operations. Examples would be transport performing supporting "Dustoff" Medevac or resupply operations, or aircraft involved in reconnaissance over hostile airspace. Awards will not be made to individuals who use air transportation solely for the purpose of moving from point to point in a combat zone.

The Army may award the Air Medal for peacetime service, but approval authority is by general-grade officers at the group or brigade level or higher. The Air Force does not award the Air Medal for peacetime sustained operational activities and flights. Non-combat meritorious service is instead awarded the Aerial Achievement Medal, instituted in 1988.

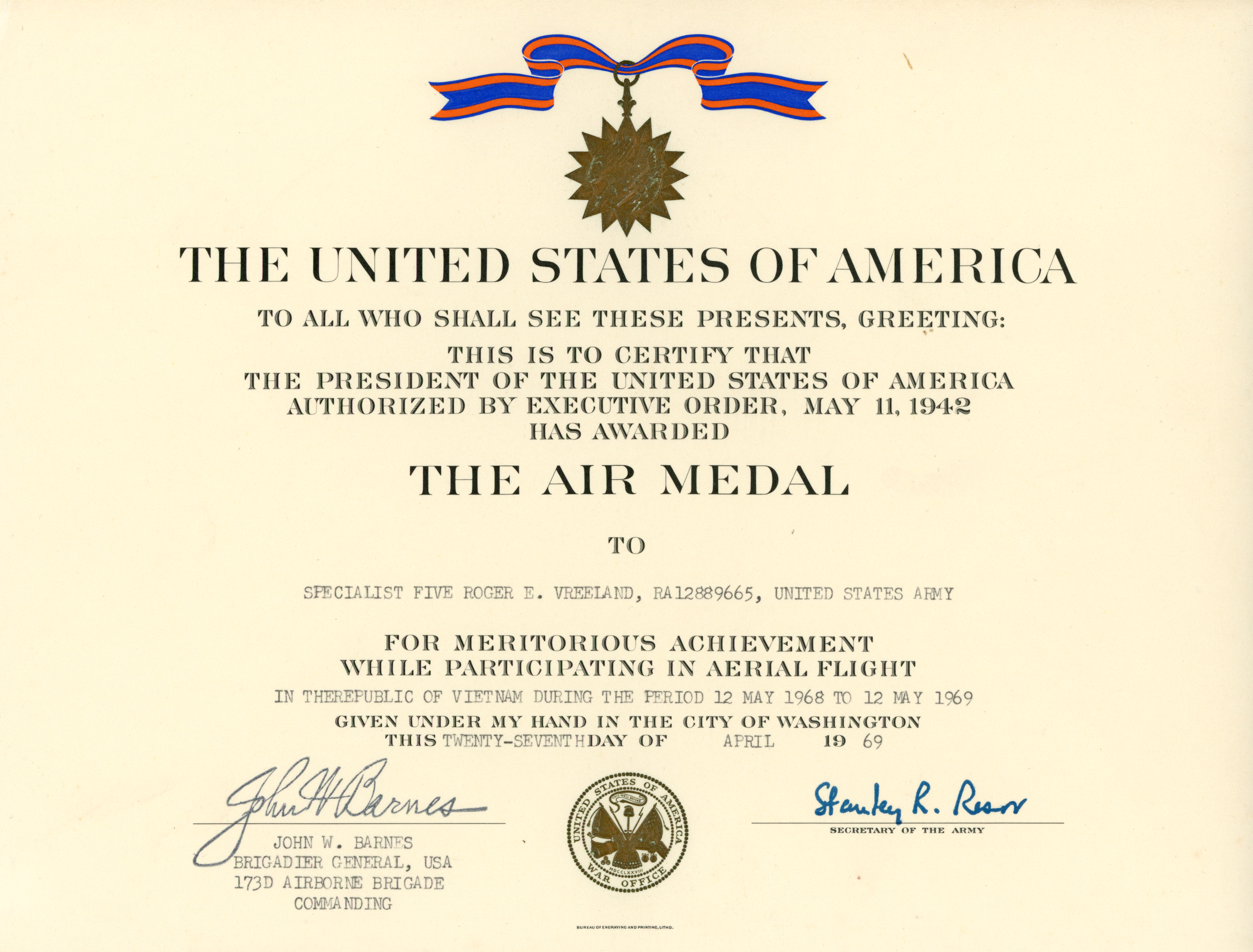
U.S. Army Air Medal Certificate for a soldier during the Vietnam War.

==== Ribbon devices ====
- The Air Force uses the aircraft sortie designation as a tool, but uses Oak Leaf Clusters rather than Strike / Flight Numerals to indicate additional awards. A member's individual flight management records will list the sorties that are eligible for the award. These sorties are designated Combat, Combat Support, or Operational (Active Air Defense or Hostile Reconnaissance). Only the first sortie of the day counts. Armed aircraft crews require ten sorties for each award, while all others require twenty sorties.
- The United States Secretary of the Air Force approved the "V" Device for Air Medals awarded for heroism in combat effective October 21, 2004. This applies to all Air Force members (Active Duty, Air Force Reserve, Air National Guard), retirees, and veterans. The "V" device is not authorized for wear on the medal for an earlier date.

== Variants ==
=== US Air Force ===
The United States Air Force does not utilize numeral devices on the Air Medal. Subsequent awards are annotated with the traditional oak leaf clusters (OLCs). Enlisted members are also awarded three points toward promotion per award.

Each ribbon carries a maximum of four OLCs; the ribbon signifies the first award, a bronze OLC equals one additional award, and a silver OLC represents five additional awards. If there were more than four OLC devices awarded (like the 10th, 14th, 15th, 18th, 19th, and 20th awards), extra Air Medal ribbons were issued to wear the extra OLCs (although only one Air Medal was awarded). Multiple Air Medals were usually earned by aircrew with extensive flight time and long meritorious service records, like during World War II or Korea.

The award of the medal is sometimes denoted on a member's gravestone with the abbreviation "AM" followed by an ampersand and the number of OLCs. For example, "AM&5 OLC" means Air Medal and five oak leaf clusters.

=== US Army ===
==== Air Medal [Army] (1944–1968) ====
The United States Army used the same criteria as the Air Force. Oak leaf clusters were awarded on the Air Medal's ribbon for additional awards – Bronze OLCs for every additional award and Silver OLCs for every five additional awards. Extra ribbons were worn to hold extra OLCs if the recipient had earned more than four OLCs.

One award was credited per every 25 hours of combat assault flights (any flight in which the aircraft was directly involved in combat), 50 hours of combat support flights (Visual Reconnaissance or Resupply), or 100 hours of non-combat service flights (Administrative or VIP flights). Flight hours were calculated in six-minute blocks.

In 1968 numerals replaced the oak leaf clusters to simplify their display.

==== Air Medal [Army] (1968–2006) ====
During the Vietnam War, the US Army awarded the Air Medal to Warrant Officer or Commissioned pilots and enlisted aircrew for actual flight time (awards were also made to infantry troops who flew on combat assault missions). This became a bureaucratic nightmare to correctly log because of the short flight time of typical helicopter flights. Later, an equivalent "flight hours" conversion was created and an award standard was set by individual commands. This eventually was standardized in theater to one award per every 24 "flight hours" logged. A simplified set time was awarded depending on the type of mission, regardless of the actual flight time. Administrative or VIP flights counted for a quarter hour, regular duties (such as Visual Reconnaissance or Resupply) counted for a half hour, and hazardous duties (combat assaults or extractions) counted for one hour. Pilots and aircrew could log over 1,000 "flight hours" a year and earn a 40 or higher numeral on their Air Medal ribbon.

The "score card" system was retained after the war. This was changed on December 11, 2006, to an award for every six months of meritorious service instead of the number of flight hours.

==== Air Medal [Army] (2006–present) ====
Currently (as per AR 600-8-22 [December 11, 2006]) the medal can be awarded for every six months of meritorious service. The recipient must perform flight-related duties while serving in a combat zone. The number of flight hours logged is no longer a criterion. The soldier must be assigned as air crew with flight status (i.e., as a pilot, navigator, or gunner). Soldiers without flight status can be eligible if they help with an aerial attack during general transport (e.g., as a door gunner), serve as a combat controller (e.g., as a Pathfinder or Forward Air Controller) or the combat commander of an air or land operation at the Group or Brigade level or lower. Soldiers being transported by air as passengers are not eligible for the meritorious service award, but they may be eligible for the gallantry award.

==== Ribbon devices ====
- Subsequent awards of the Air Medal are denoted in the U.S. Army by Numeral devices displayed on the medal and ribbon. The Army originally used oak leaf clusters to signify additional awards. However, this was changed to numeral devices in September 1968, during the Vietnam War, when the number of Air Medals awarded became too large to be annotated on a single ribbon.
- Since February 29, 1964, the medal may be awarded with a "V" Device for an act of heroism against an armed enemy less than the criteria for the Distinguished Flying Cross.

=== US Navy/US Marine Corps ===
The United States Navy and United States Marine Corps have two types of Air Medal awards: "Individual" for singular meritorious acts and "Strike/Flight" for participation in sustained aerial flight operations.

==== Ribbon devices ====
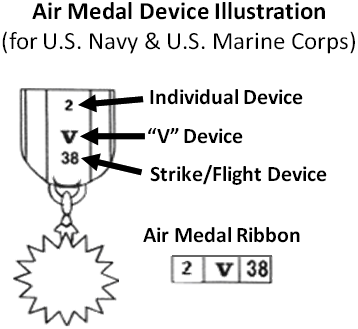

- As of September 27, 2006, gold Numeral devices are used to denote the number of "Individual" Air Medals. (This is a return to the standard used before November 22, 1989.)
- Bronze Strike/Flight numerals denote the total number of Strike/Flight awards. Sorties are missions or sustained operations involving aircraft, like: delivering ordnance against the enemy, landing or evacuating personnel in an assault, or in which personnel are engaged in search and rescue operations. Strikes are combat sorties that encounter enemy opposition. Flights are combat sorties that do not encounter enemy opposition.

Officers of Captain (USN) or Colonel (USMC) rank and above are not eligible for award of the Air Medal on a Strike/Flight basis unless the sorties they fly are required in the performance of their regular duties.

- Since April 5, 1974, the Combat "V" may be authorized for awards for heroism or meritorious action in conflict with an armed enemy.

==== Ribbon devices (1989–2006) ====
In the interval between November 22, 1989, and September 27, 2006, 3/16 inch bronze stars, 5/16 inch gold stars, and 5/16 inch silver stars denoted the number of "Individual" Air Medals. A bronze star was used to denote a first award. Gold stars were used for the second through the fifth awards, seventh through tenth awards, and so on. Silver stars were used in lieu of five gold stars, and denote the sixth and eleventh (and so on) awards. For "Individual" Air Medals, the Combat "V" may be authorized.

Bronze Strike/Flight numerals denoted the number of Strike/Flight awards. They are authorized for operations in hostile or disputed territory and count the total number of Strikes (operations that faced enemy opposition) and Flights (operations that did not encounter enemy opposition) added together.

=== US Coast Guard ===
The Commandant of the United States Coast Guard may award the Air Medal to any person in the Armed Forces of the United States who distinguishes themselves by heroic or meritorious achievement while participating in aerial flight.

The Coast Guard awards the "Individual" Air Medal but not the Strike/Flight Award.

==== Ribbon devices ====
- Gold and silver 5/16 inch stars are authorized for wear to denote additional Air Medal awards. The gold star denotes the second through fifth awards of the Air Medal.
- Valor Device may be authorized for wear if the award is for performance of a heroic act or acts while directly performing in conflict or combat with an armed enemy.

=== Civil Air Patrol ===
During World War II, the Air Medal was also awarded to members of the Civil Air Patrol (CAP) who participated in the CAP's anti-submarine patrol program. This was not made public at the time, since the Federal government did not want to admit it was arming civilian aircraft.

== Design ==
The medal's design is prescribed by law.

Description: A Bronze compass rose 1 11/16 inches circumscribing diameter and charged with an eagle volant carrying two lightning flashes in its talons. A fleur-de-lis at the top point holds the suspension ring. The points of the compass rose on the reverse are modeled with the central portion plain for engraving the name of the recipient.

Ribbon: The ribbon is 1 3/8 inches wide and consists of the following stripes:

1. 1/8 inch Ultramarine Blue 67118;
2. ¼ inch Golden Orange 67109;
3. center 5/8 inch Ultramarine Blue;
4. ¼ inch Golden Orange; and
5. 1/8 inch Ultramarine Blue.

Components: The following are authorized components of the Air Medal and the applicable specifications for each:

- a. Decoration (regular size): MIL-D-3943/23. NSN for decoration set is 8455-00-269-5747. For replacement medal NSN 8455-00-246-3837.
- b. Decoration (miniature size): MIL-D-3943/23. NSN 8455-00-996-5002.
- c. Ribbon: MIL-R-11589/7. NSN 8455-00-252-9963.
- d. Lapel Button: MIL-L-11484/17. NSN 8455-00-257-4308.

Designer: Walker Hancock. Hancock had competed for the medal design as a civilian, but prior to the award of the competition had been inducted into the army.
