= Oak leaf cluster =

Ribbon device used in the United States

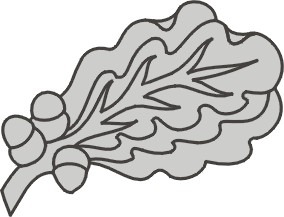
- Bronze and silver oak leaf clusters
- Type: Ribbon device
- Awarded for: To denote preceding decorations and awards.
- Presented by: Department of Defense; Department of the Army; Department of the Air Force
- Status: Currently in use

An oak leaf cluster is a ribbon device to denote preceding decorations and awards consisting of a miniature bronze or silver twig of four oak leaves with three acorns on the stem. It is authorized by the United States Armed Forces for a specific set of decorations and awards of the Department of Defense, Department of the Army, and Department of the Air Force.

The bronze oak leaf cluster represents one additional award, while the silver oak leaf cluster is worn in lieu of five bronze oak leaf clusters.

== Criteria and wear ==
Oak leaf clusters are worn with the stems of the leaves pointing to the wearer's right. For medals, 13/32-inch (10 mm) oak leaf clusters are worn on the medal's suspension ribbon. For service ribbons, 5/16-inch (7.9 mm) oak leaf clusters are worn, with no more than four oak leaf clusters being worn side by side. If the number of authorized oak leaf clusters exceeds four, a second ribbon is authorized for wear and is worn after the first ribbon. The second ribbon counts as one additional award, after which more leaf clusters may be added to the second ribbon. If future awards reduce the number of oak leaf clusters worn on the first ribbon due to bronze oak leaf clusters being replaced by a silver oak leaf cluster, the second ribbon is removed and the appropriate number of devices is placed on the first ribbon.

=== Examples ===
The following are examples of the first through twenty-first awards of an Army Commendation Medal with the bronze and silver oak leaf clusters:

First award
Second award
Third award
Fourth award
Fifth award
Sixth award
Seventh award
Eighth award
Ninth award
Tenth award
Eleventh award
Twelfth award
Thirteenth award
Fourteenth award
Fifteenth award
Sixteenth award
Seventeenth award
Eighteenth award
Nineteenth award
Twentieth award
Twenty-first award

== Decorations and awards ==
Oak leaf clusters may be worn on Department of Defense, Department of the Army, and Department of the Air Force decorations and awards presented to members of the eight uniformed services: the Army, Navy, Marine Corps, Air Force, Space Force, Coast Guard, Public Health Service, and the NOAA Commissioned Corps.

Army personnel	Air Force and Space Force personnel	Navy, Marines, Coast Guard, PHS, and NOAA personnel
Distinguished Service Cross and Air Force Cross	Distinguished Service Cross and Air Force Cross	Distinguished Service Cross and Air Force Cross
Defense Distinguished Service Medal	Defense Distinguished Service Medal	Defense Distinguished Service Medal
Distinguished Service Medal and Air Force Distinguished Service Medal	Distinguished Service Medal and Air Force Distinguished Service Medal	Distinguished Service Medal and Air Force Distinguished Service Medal
Silver Star	Silver Star	
Defense Superior Service Medal	Defense Superior Service Medal	Defense Superior Service Medal
Legion of Merit	Legion of Merit	
Distinguished Flying Cross	Distinguished Flying Cross	
Soldier's Medal and Airman's Medal	Soldier's Medal and Airman's Medal	Soldier's Medal and Airman's Medal
Bronze Star Medal	Bronze Star Medal	
Purple Heart	Purple Heart	
Defense Meritorious Service Medal	Defense Meritorious Service Medal	Defense Meritorious Service Medal
Meritorious Service Medal	Meritorious Service Medal	
	Air Medal	
	Aerial Achievement Medal	
Joint Service Commendation Medal	Joint Service Commendation Medal	Joint Service Commendation Medal
Army and Air Force Commendation Medal	Army and Air Force Commendation Medal	Army and Air Force Commendation Medal
Joint Service Achievement Medal	Joint Service Achievement Medal	Joint Service Achievement Medal
Army and Air Force Achievement Medal	Army and Air Force Achievement Medal	Army and Air Force Achievement Medal
Army Reserve Components Achievement Medal	Combat Readiness Medal	
	Air Force Good Conduct Medal and Space Force Good Conduct Medal	
	Air and Space Longevity Service Award	
Presidential Unit Citation	Presidential Unit Citation	
	Overseas Service Ribbon (long and short tours)	
Joint Meritorious Unit Award	Joint Meritorious Unit Award	Joint Meritorious Unit Award
Valorous Unit Award	Gallant Unit Citation	
Meritorious Unit Commendation	Meritorious Unit Award	
Superior Unit Award	Outstanding Unit Award	
	Organizational Excellence Award	
	Air Force NCO PME Graduate Ribbon	
	Air and Space Training Ribbon	

Except for the Air Medal, unique decorations and awards issued by Department of the Army or Department of the Air Force, and those decorations and awards issued by the Department of Defense, the other uniformed services use 5/16 inch stars to indicate subsequent personal decorations only; a gold 5/16 inch star is equivalent to a bronze oak leaf cluster, while a silver 5/16 inch star is equivalent to a silver oak leaf cluster. While the Air Force uses oak leaf clusters for the Air Medal, since the Vietnam War, the Army has used 3/16-inch (4.8 mm) bronze Arabic numerals to denote subsequent awards, in which case the ribbon denotes the first award and numerals starting with the numeral "2" denote additional awards.

== Other nations ==
In other nations, oak leaf clusters are also used as symbols for various awards and decorations. In Germany, the German oak is the national tree of Germany, thus oak leaves are a prominent symbol on most German military orders. During World War II, the Knight's Cross of the German Iron Cross could be awarded with the additional distinction of oak leaves (mit Eichenlaub). Of the 7,313 awards of the Knight's Cross, only 882 received oak leaves. After World War II, Iron Crosses awarded previously could be worn by the recipient provided the swastika was replaced by oak leaves. The Bundeswehr awards the Cross of Honour for Bravery for extraordinary bravery. The Cross of Honour for Bravery differs from the Badge of Honour by an adornment in the shape of stylized double oak leaves. Furthermore, it was featured on the Pfennig in Germany and since the introduction of the euro in 2001 it is used on the obverse side of the German euro coinage. In earlier times, the Pour le Mérite, the highest military order in the Kingdom of Prussia, could also be awarded with oak leaves. A civil version of the order, for accomplishments in the arts and sciences, still exists in the Federal Republic of Germany.

In Commonwealth countries, a bronze oak leaf signifies a Mention in Despatches, and is worn as a gallantry award in its own right, rather than to signify multiple instances of campaign service. The Commonwealth equivalent of a United States oak leaf cluster is a medal bar worn with a campaign medal.

Oak leaves are a common motif on military symbols in Turkey because of the famed longevity of the oak tree. They appear on the emblem of Turkish Land Forces, the emblem of Gendarmerie General Command and together with acorns on the non-commissioned officer insignia of Turkish Naval Forces.

== See also ==
- Awards and decorations of the United States military
- United States military award devices
- 5/16 inch star
- Service, battle, or campaign star
