= Obsolete military awards of the United States =

List of awards

Obsolete military awards of the United States are United States military awards which have been officially removed from U.S. military award precedence charts and are listed as "Obsolete Military Decorations" in military award publications and instructions.

Typically, the U.S. military will declare a decoration obsolete twenty to thirty years after its last issuance to an active duty member of the military or, in the case of medals designed for members of the reserve forces, a drilling reservist attending annual training. Medals for valor (such as the Medal of Honor and Silver Star) are rarely declared obsolete regardless of the amount of time which has passed since the last issuance. This is since such medals could be reinstated, on very short notice, in the event of an armed conflict in which the United States armed forces would be called to service.

Although United States service medals of the World Wars have also been declared obsolete by the U.S. military, many may still be found in various charts, publications, and instructions. This is since a large number of veterans still display such medals as retirement awards or through functions and ceremonies with various veteran groups such as the Veterans of Foreign Wars and the American Legion.

The following decorations have been declared obsolete with most such decorations indicating service in military operations prior to 1935.

== Revolutionary War ==
Badge of Military Merit

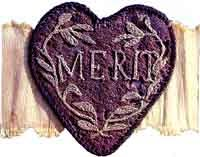

Fidelity Medallion

== Inter-service ==
The National Match Team ("Dogs of War") Medal

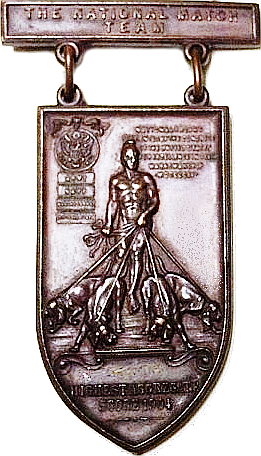

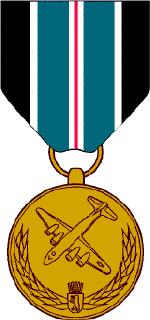
Medal for Humane Action

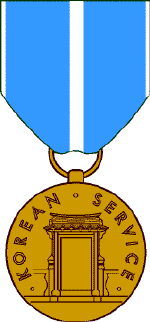
Korean Service Medal

== Army service ==
Certificate of Merit Medal

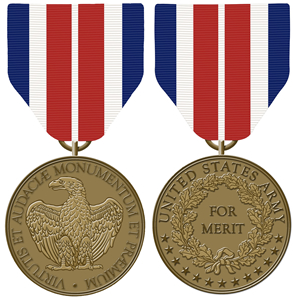

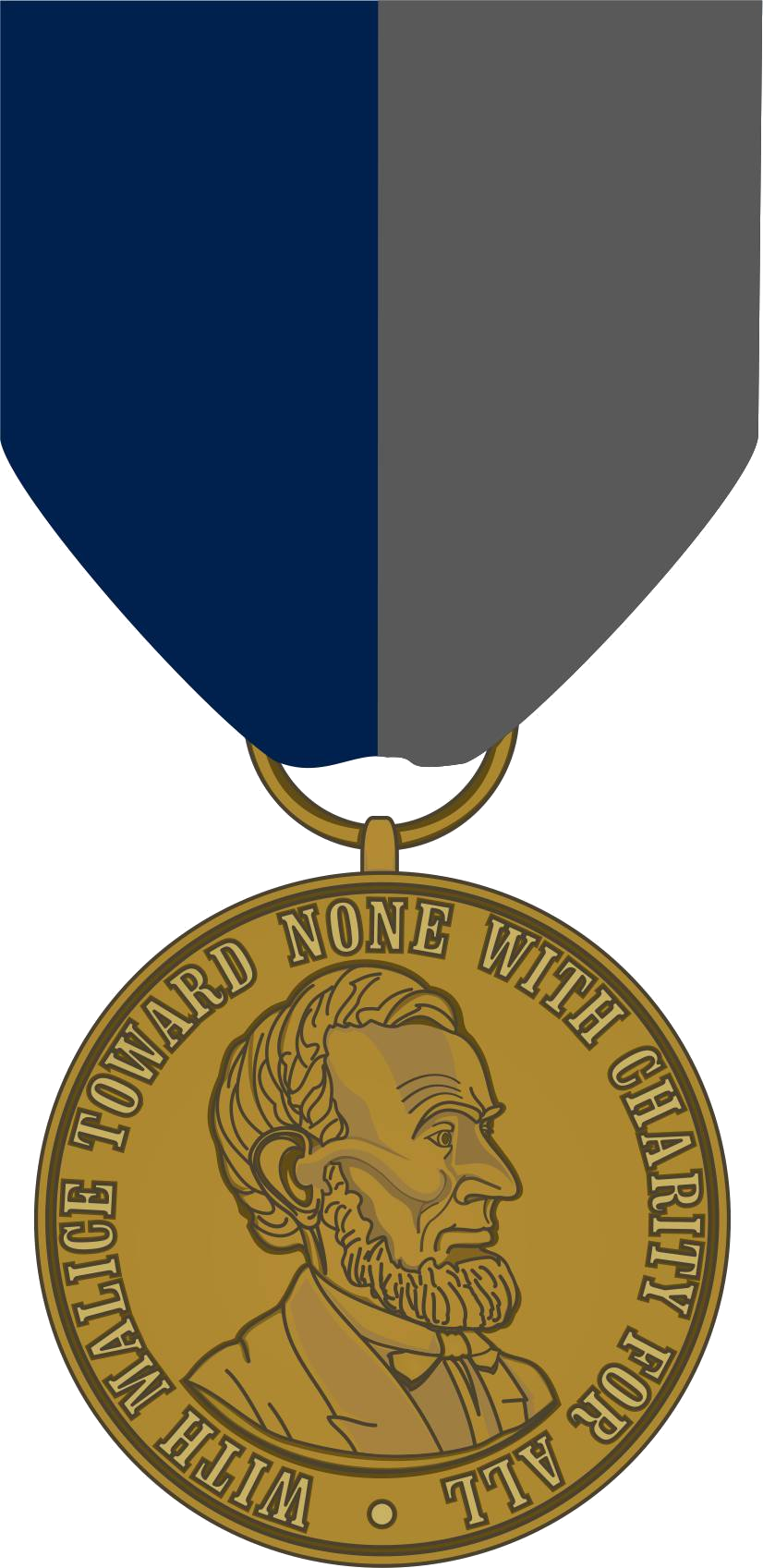
Civil War Campaign Medal

Indian Campaign Medal

Spanish Campaign Medal

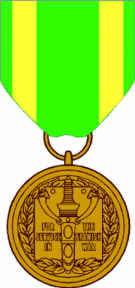
Spanish War Service Medal

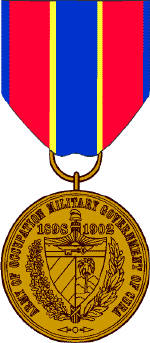
Army of Cuban Occupation Medal

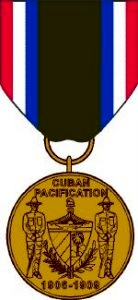
Army of Cuban Pacification Medal

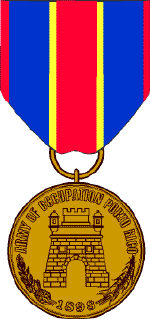
Army of Puerto Rican Occupation Medal

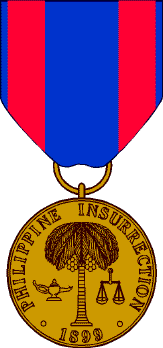
Philippine Campaign Medal

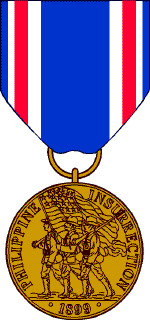
Philippine Congressional Medal

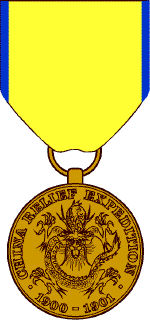
China Campaign Medal

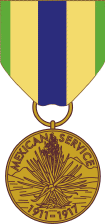
Mexican Service Medal

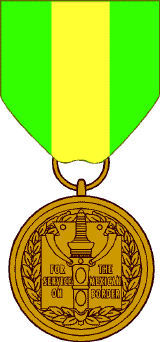
Mexican Border Service Medal

Army Wound Ribbon

Army Marksmanship Prize Medals (multiple versions)

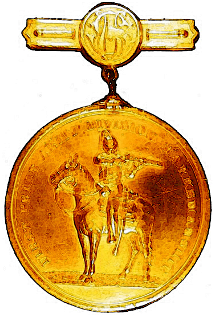

Army Team Marksmanship Medals (1st version)

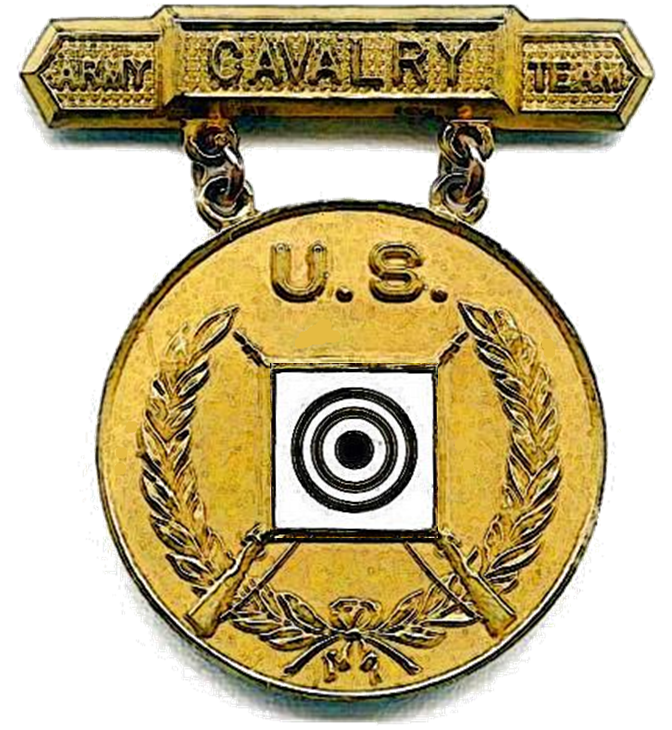

Army Distinguished Aerial Gunner/Bomber Medals

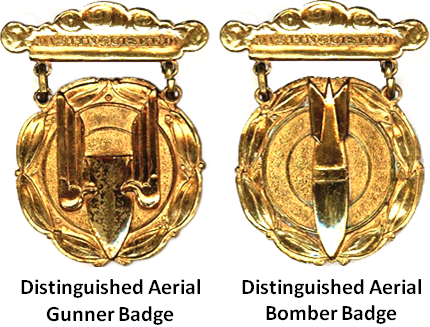

Army Team Marksmanship Medals (2nd version)

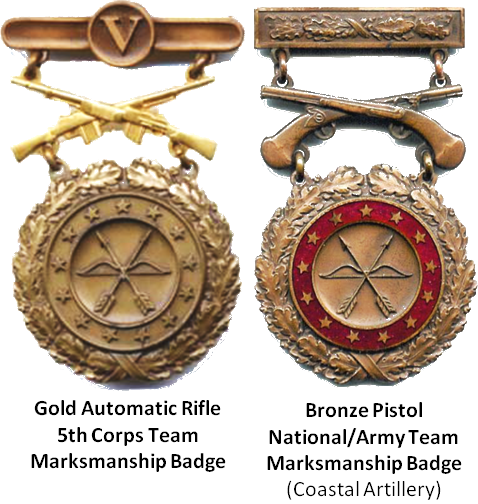

Army Distinguished Automatic Rifleman Medal

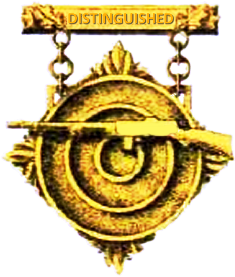

== Navy and Marine Corps service ==
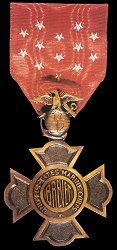
Marine Corps Brevet Medal

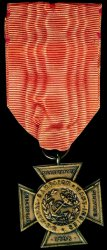
Specially Meritorious Service Medal

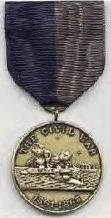
Civil War Campaign Medal

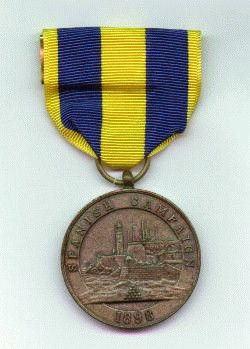
Spanish Campaign Medal

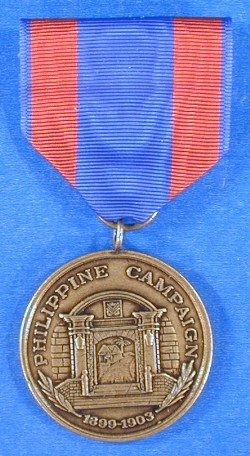
Philippine Campaign Medal

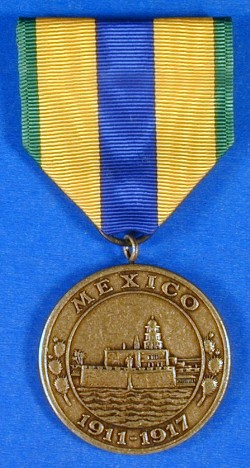
Mexican Service Medal

West Indies Campaign Medal

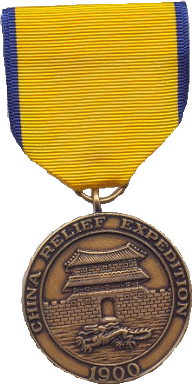
China Relief Expedition Medal

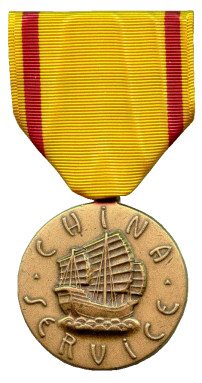
China Service Medal

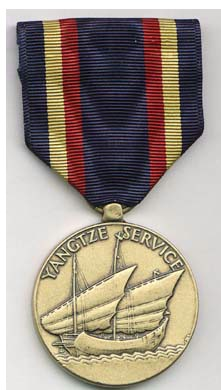
Yangtze Service Medal

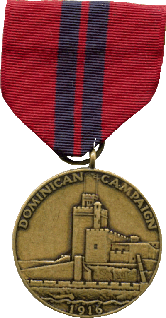
Dominican Campaign Medal

Cuban Pacification Medal

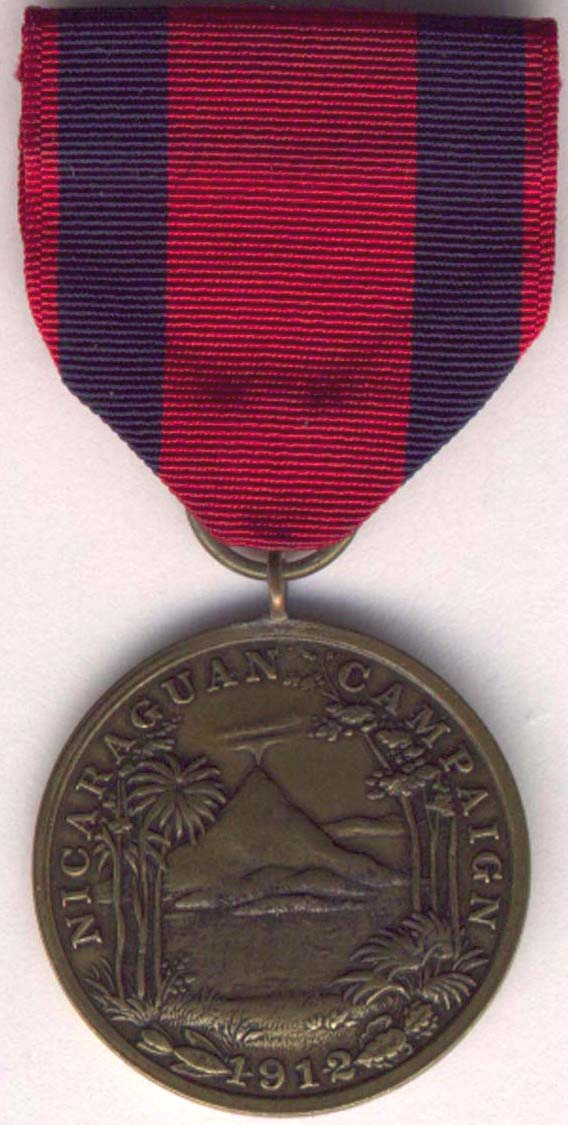
Nicaraguan Campaign Medal

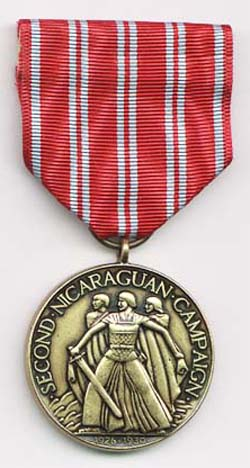
Second Nicaraguan Campaign Medal

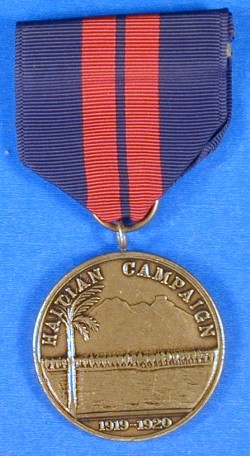
Haitian Campaign Medal (1917 & 1921)

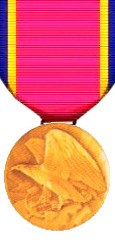
Naval Reserve Medal

Navy Fleet Marine Force Ribbon

Marine Corps Reserve Ribbon

Reserve Special Commendation Ribbon

Distinguished Marksman and Pistol Shot Ribbon

Distinguished Marksman Ribbon

Distinguished Pistol Shot Ribbon

Marine Corps Marksmanship Competition Medals (1st version)

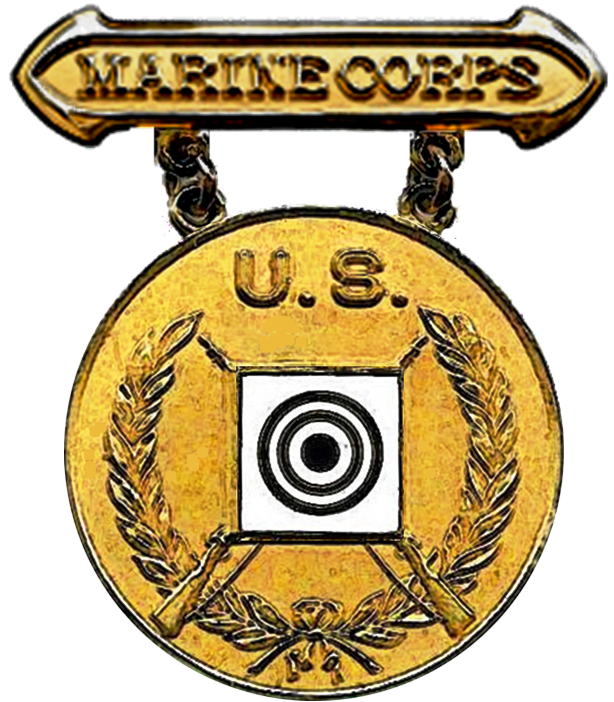

Navy Expert Team Rifleman Medal

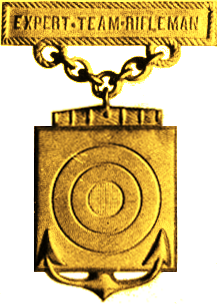

== Coast Guard service ==
Transportation Distinguished Service Medal

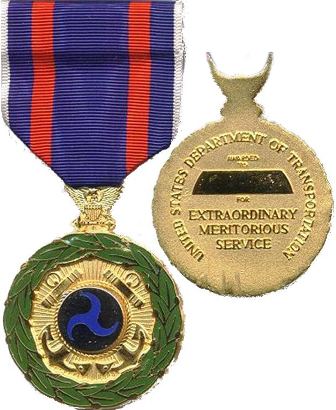

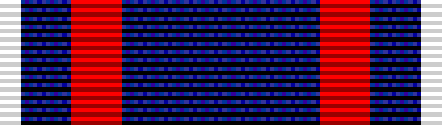

Secretary of Transportation Outstanding Unit Award

Coast Guard Bicentennial Unit Commendation

== Air Force service ==
Air Force Recruiter Ribbon

Air Force Military Training Instructor Ribbon

Air Force Gold & Silver Elementary Excellence-In-Competition Medals

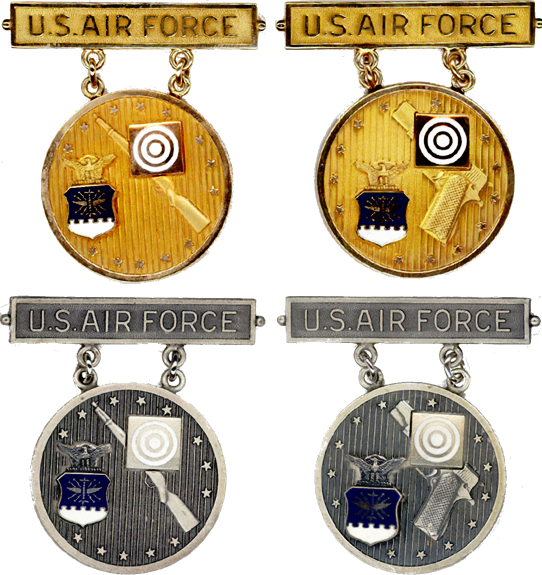

Air Force Gold National Excellence-In-Competition Medals

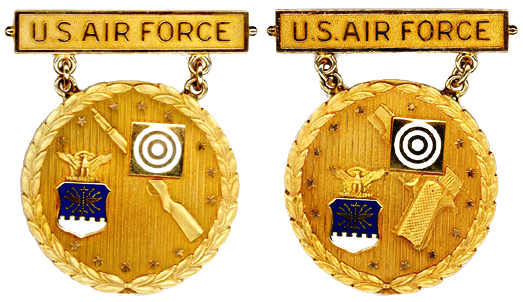

== See also ==
- Awards and decorations of the United States military
- Obsolete badges of the United States military
