= Inter-service awards and decorations of the United States military =

The United States military inter-service awards and decorations are those medals and ribbons which may be awarded to all members of the six military branches of the U.S. Armed Forces. Each military department awards inter-service awards under the same criteria.

== History ==
The World War I Victory Medal was the first inter-service award. This was followed by the Purple Heart, Silver Star Medal, Legion of Merit, Distinguished Flying Cross, and Air Medal decorations. Prior to this time, several older service medals had been issued both to the Army and Navy, but in different versions for each service. The World War I Victory Medal, Purple Heart, Silver Star, Legion of Merit, Distinguished Flying Cross, and Air Medal were thus the first medals which appeared identical, regardless of which service was bestowing the award.

By the end of World War II, several World War II service medals had also been established for issuance to both Army and Navy personnel. The United States Coast Guard also received such awards under the authority of the Department of the Navy. After World War II, The Korean Service Medal was the first inter-service non-decoration award which was awarded by all five branches of the U.S. Armed Forces; in 1947, the United States Air Force had been established as a separate branch of service. Since 1956, and 2010, the Distinguished Flying Cross, and Silver Star Medal may also be awarded by the Coast Guard.

In the 1960s and 1970s, the U.S. Armed Forces created the Meritorious Service Medal, and several campaign medals and service awards, all of which may be awarded by any service branch.

The United States Department of Defense in the 1960s and 1970s, also began creating a series of peacetime meritorious awards which were eligible for presentation to any military member working in a joint command or under the authority of the Secretary of Defense. The last such medal, the Joint Service Achievement Medal decoration, was created in 1983. The only inter-service unit award, the Joint Meritorious Unit Award was created in 1981.

On April 5, 2011, President Barack Obama amended Executive Order 12824 modifying the award eligibility of the Homeland Security Distinguished Service Medal to "any member of the Armed Forces of the United States" making it an inter-service award of the U.S. military. Recently, this decoration has been given to Gen Craig R. McKinley (USAF) for his service as Chief of the National Guard Bureau.

The Medal of Honor, originally a Navy award, is now technically an inter-service award, is issued in different versions for each branch of military service. There are presently three versions of the decoration in existence for the Army, Navy, and Air Force. Marines receive the Navy version of the Medal of Honor while a Coast Guard version, which exists in theory, has never been bestowed (the one Coast Guard recipient of the Medal of Honor received the Navy version).

The following are the various military medals of the United States which are considered inter-service awards and decorations. Medals are shown in categories, not in order of precedence for uniform wear.

== Medal of Honor ==
Medal of Honor

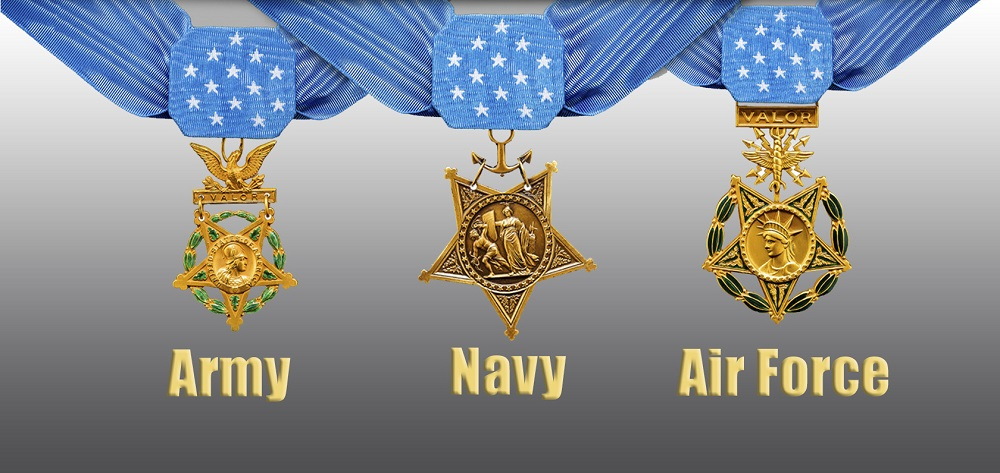

== Service Cross Medals ==
Awarded for "extraordinary heroism in combat"

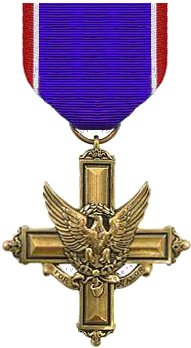
Distinguished Service Cross (Army)

Navy Cross

Air Force Cross

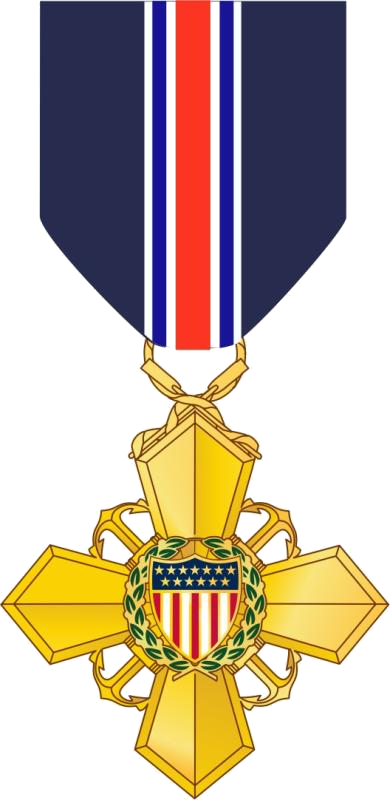
Coast Guard Cross

== Department level military decorations ==
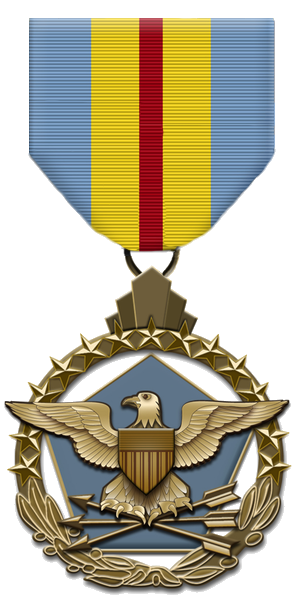
Defense Distinguished Service Medal

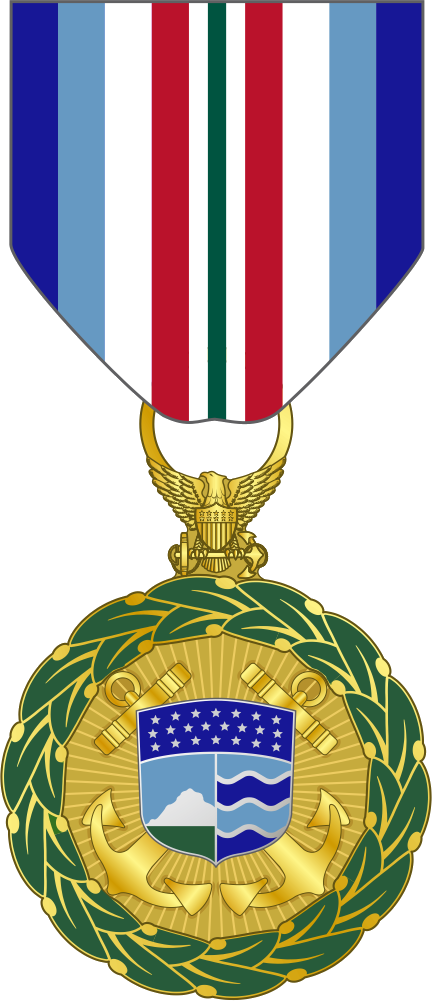
Homeland Security Distinguished Service Medal

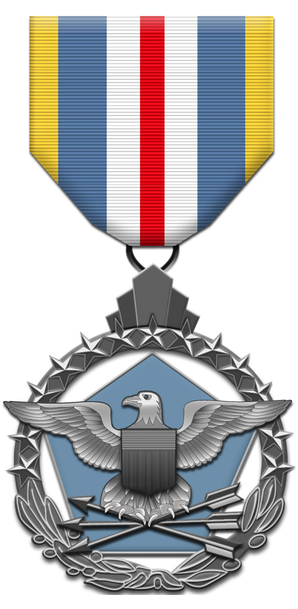
Defense Superior Service Medal

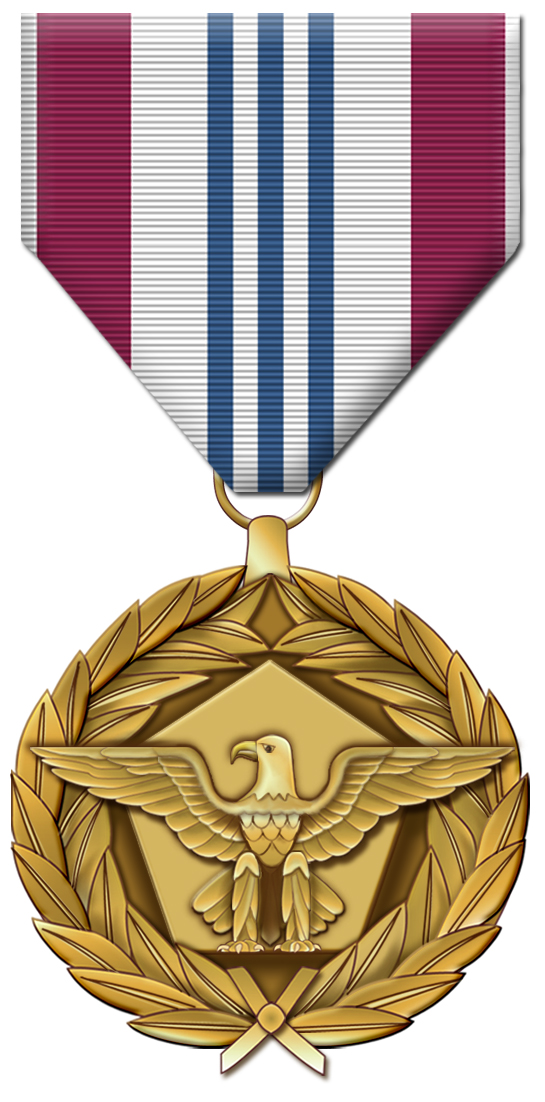
Defense Meritorious Service Medal

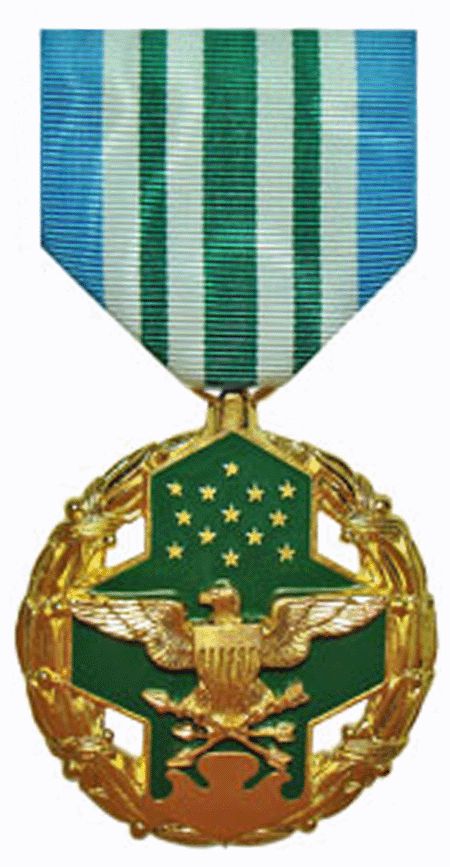
Joint Service Commendation Medal

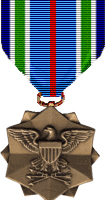
Joint Service Achievement Medal

Joint Meritorious Unit Award

== Federal military decorations ==
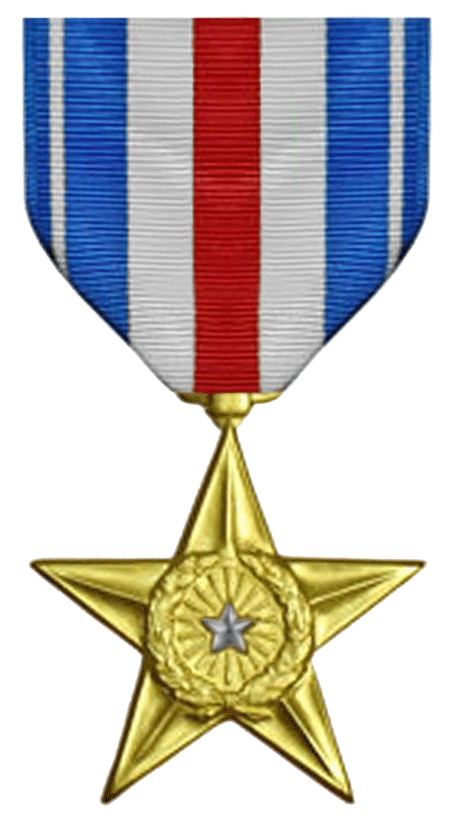
Silver Star

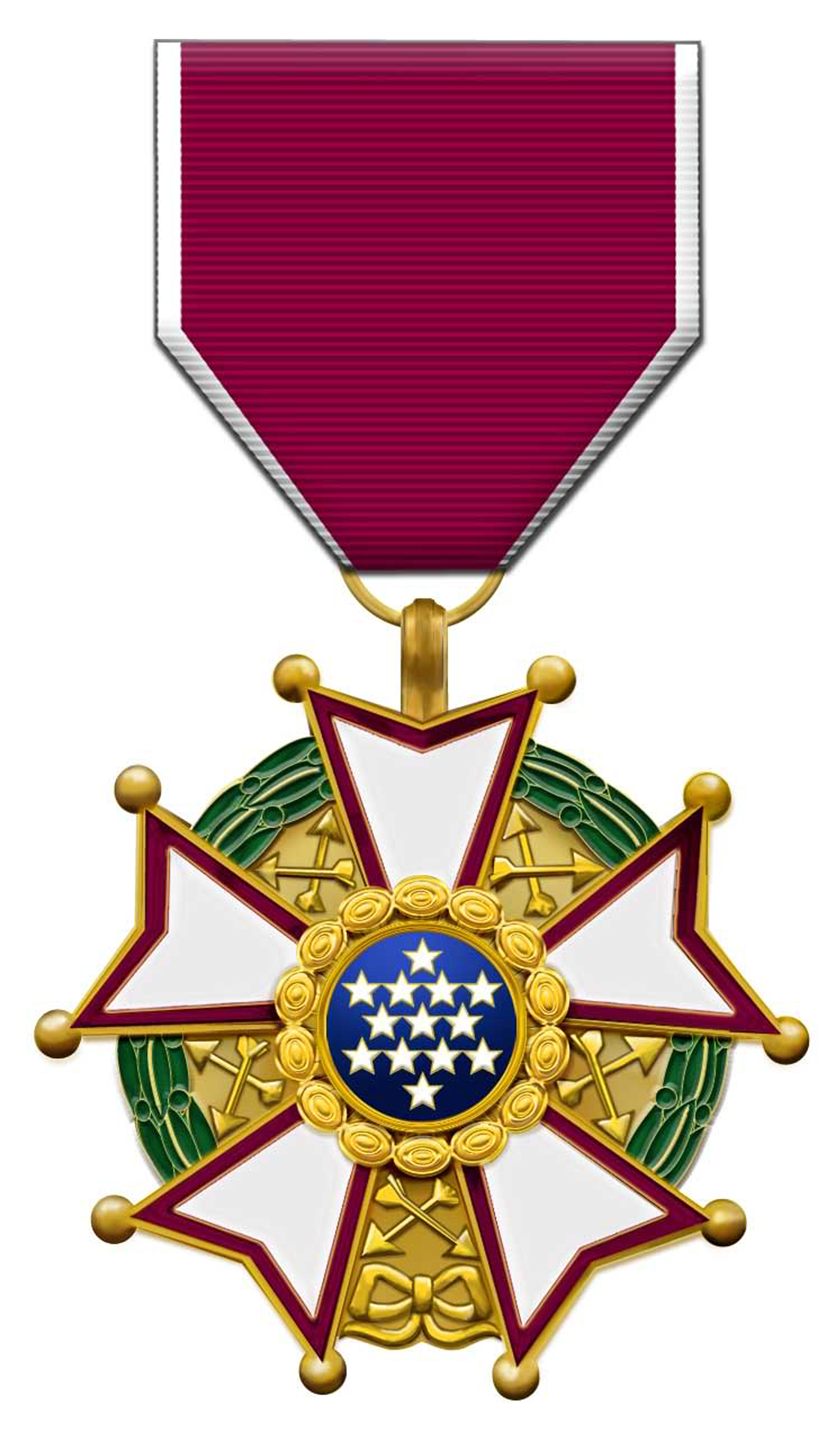
Legion of Merit

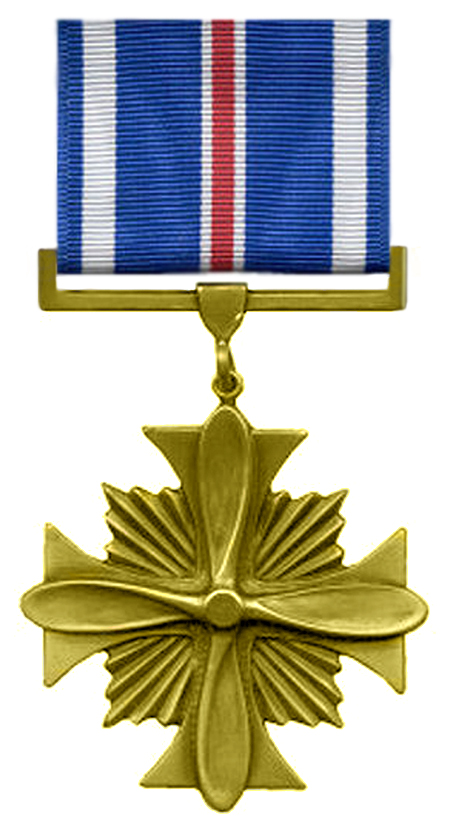
Distinguished Flying Cross

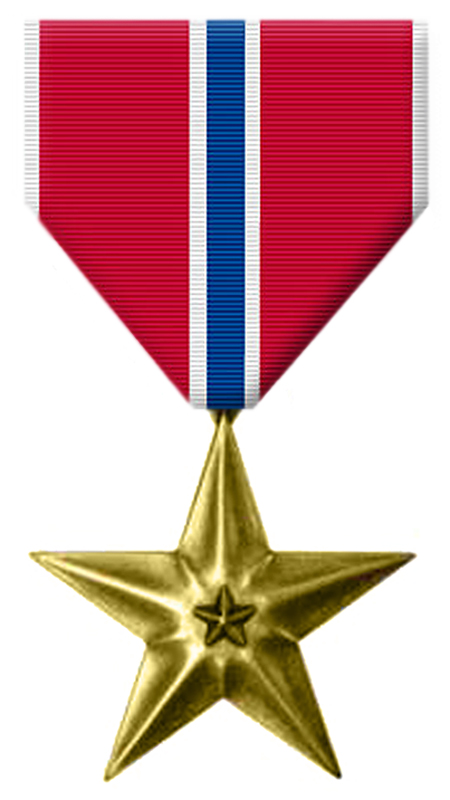
Bronze Star Medal

Purple Heart

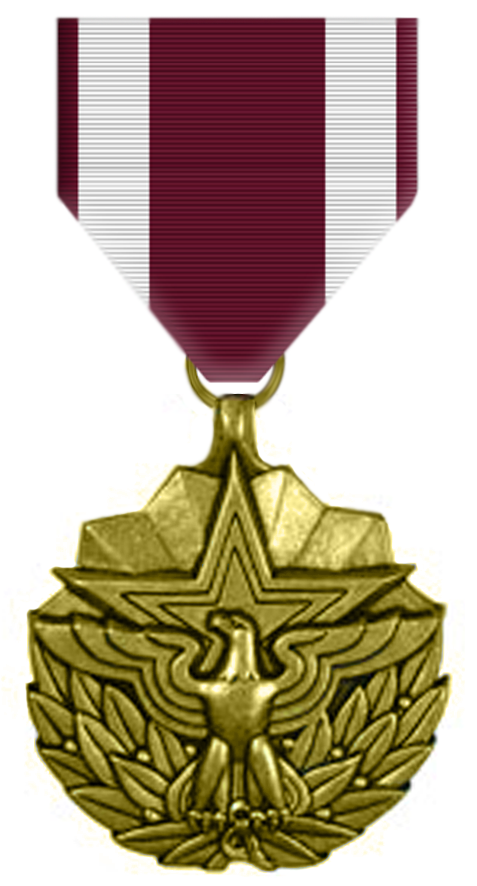
Meritorious Service Medal

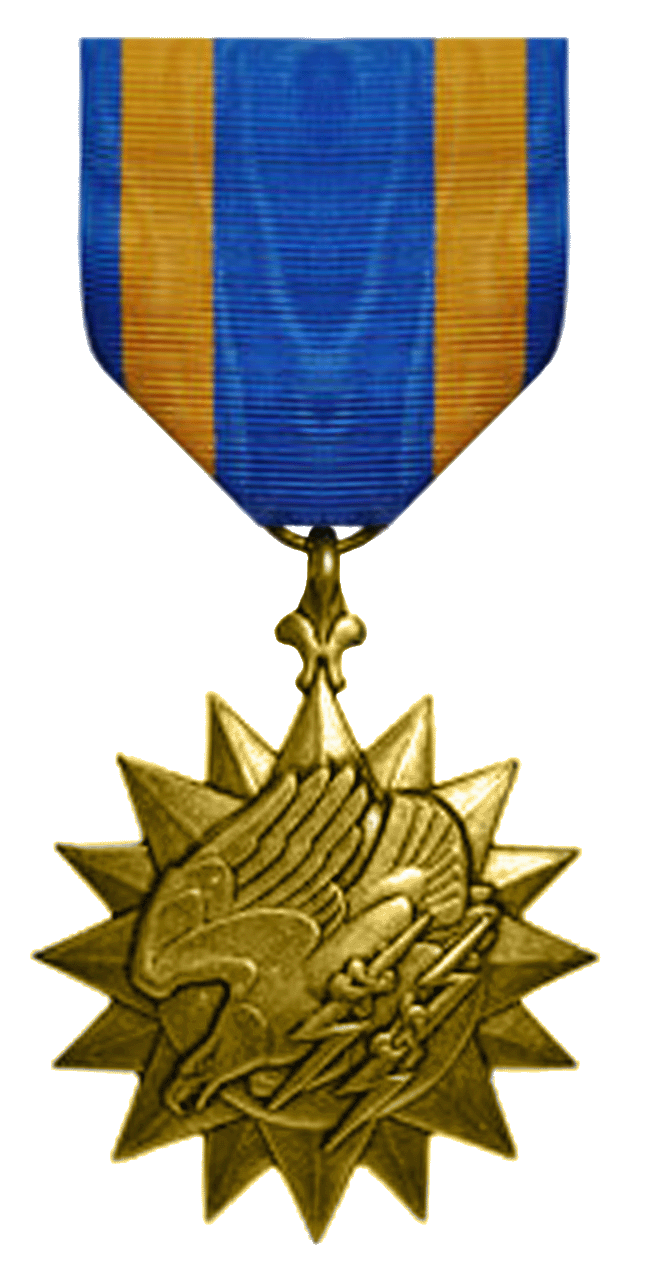
Air Medal

== Federal service awards ==
=== General service ===
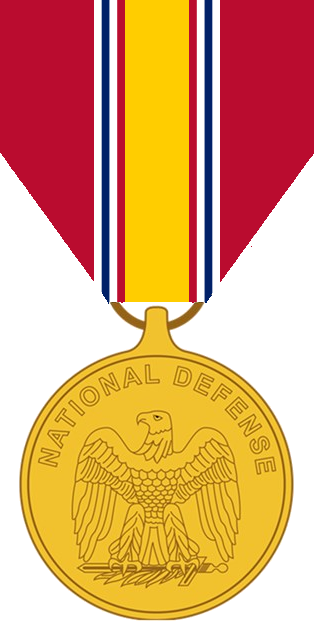
National Defense Service Medal

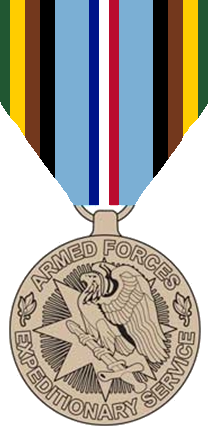
Armed Forces Expeditionary Medal

Humanitarian Service Medal

Military Outstanding Volunteer Service Medal

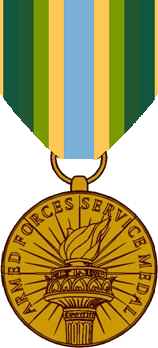
Armed Forces Service Medal

=== Reserve and Special service ===
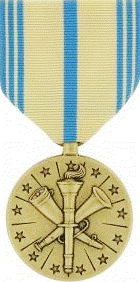
Armed Forces Reserve Medal

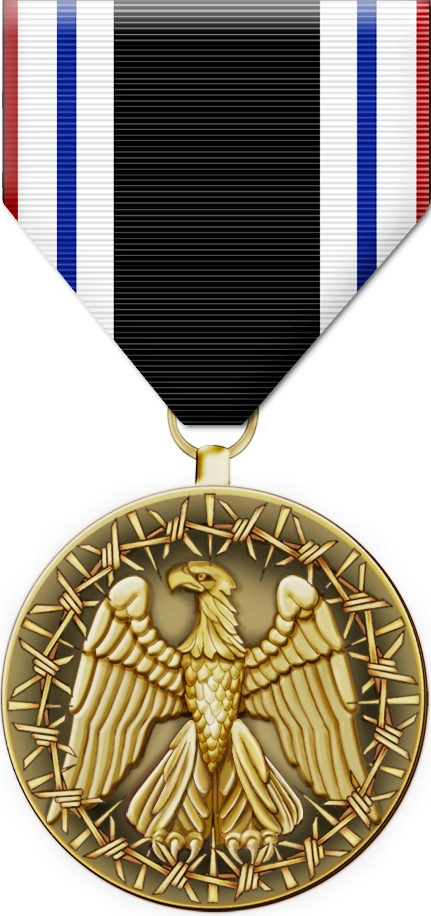
Prisoner of War Medal

Antarctica Service Medal

=== Korean War service ===
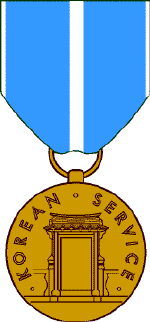
Korean Service Medal

Korea Defense Service Medal

=== Vietnam War, Persian Gulf War, and Balkans service ===
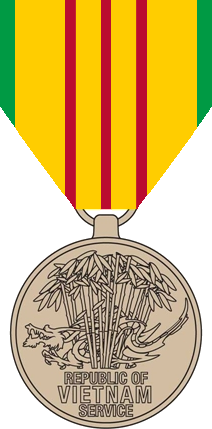
Vietnam Service Medal

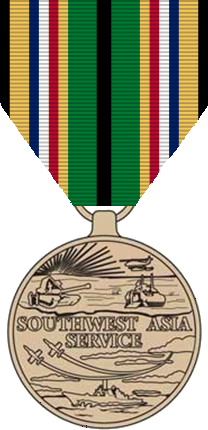
Southwest Asia Service Medal

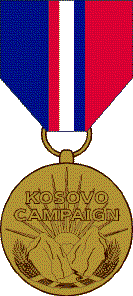
Kosovo Campaign Medal

=== Global War on Terrorism ===
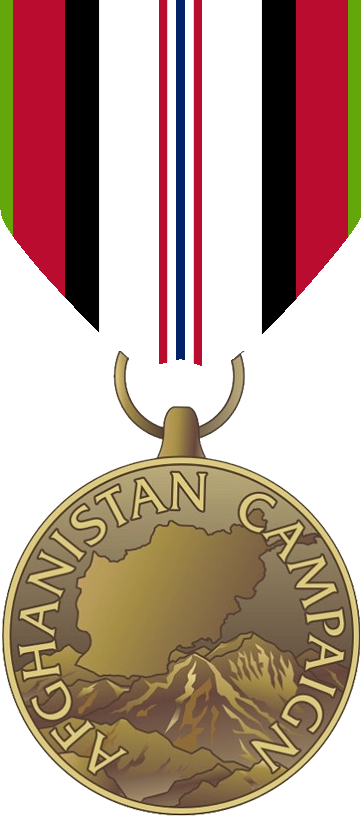
Afghanistan Campaign Medal

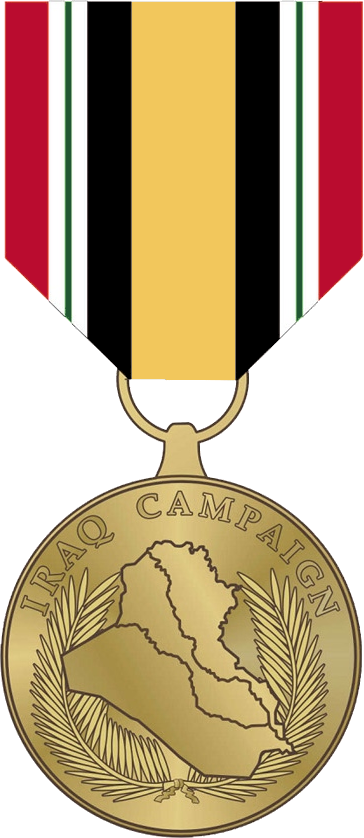
Iraq Campaign Medal

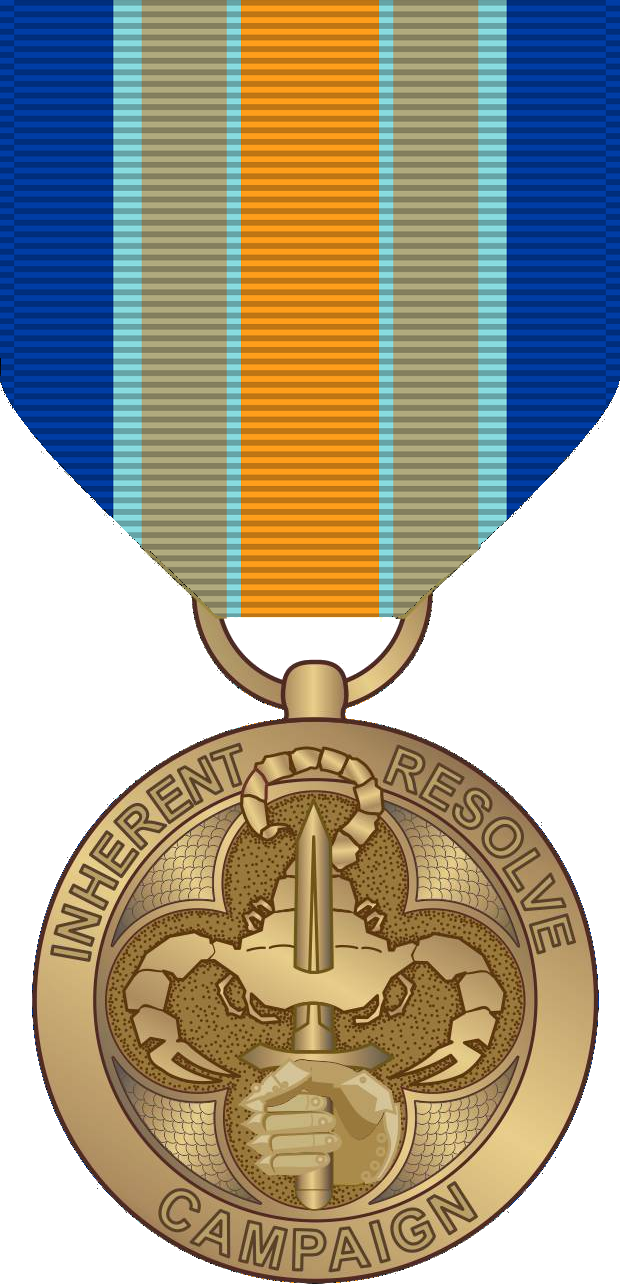
Inherent Resolve Campaign Medal

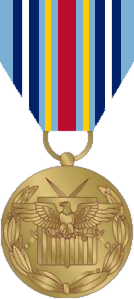
Global War on Terrorism Expeditionary Medal

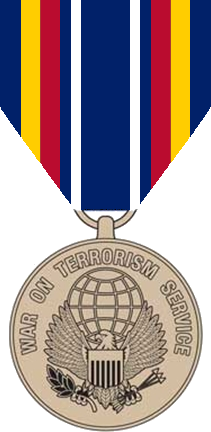
Global War on Terrorism Service Medal

== See also ==
- Awards and decorations of the United States Armed Forces
