= Good conduct loop =

US Army award

Good Conduct Loop Clasps
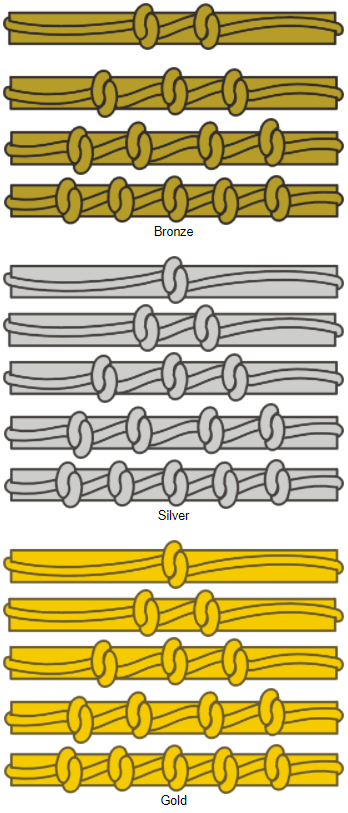
- Type: Ribbon Device
- Awarded for: Every three years of qualifying good service
- Sponsored by: United States Army
- Status: Currently Awarded
- Established: 1941
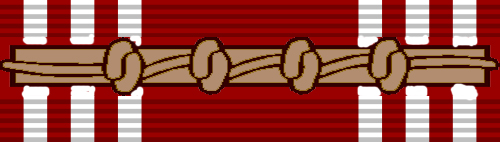
- Example of Good Conduct Medal ribbon with 4th award (12 years of service)
- Related: Enlistment Bar

A good conduct knot/loop is an award device of the Department of the Army which denotes additional decorations of the Army Good Conduct Medal.

== History ==
Good conduct loops were first created in 1941 and were based on the concept of the enlistment bar. Good Conduct Loops have remained the primary method of displaying multiple bestowals of the Army Good Conduct Medal, and may be said to show how many "hitches" (periods of service) a soldier has served. The current U.S. Army policy is to award the medal after every three years of qualifying service.

Good conduct loops are worn on a clasp attached to the service ribbon and suspension ribbon of the Good Conduct Medal. A Good Conduct Loop comprises a clasp with several inscribed loops. The second award of a Good Conduct Medal would display a bronze clasp with two loops, the third would show a bronze clasp with three loops, and so on. At six loops, the clasp changes to silver, and then at eleven loops the clasp changes to gold. Thus, a silver clasp with two loops would denote the seventh award of the Good Conduct Medal while a gold clasp with five loops would indicate the fifteenth award of the Good Conduct Medal, which is the highest that the regulations list.

The Army Good Conduct Medal is the only one of the service Good Conduct awards which uses Good Conduct Loops. The U.S. Navy, U.S. Marine Corps, and U.S. Coast Guard display additional Good Conduct awards with service stars, while the U.S. Air Force uses oak leaf clusters.

== See also ==
- Awards and decorations of the United States military
- United States military award devices
