= Reserve Good Conduct Medal =

United States Armed Forces award

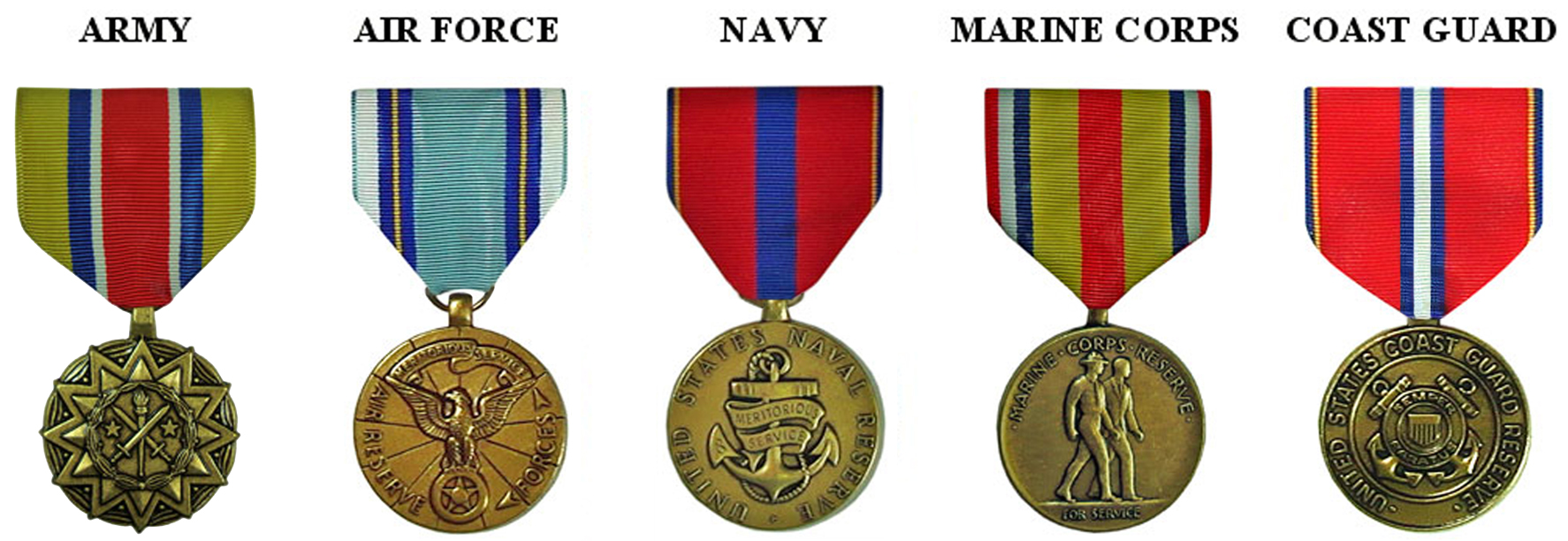
- Type: Military medal
- Presented by: the United States Armed Forces
- Eligibility: Active members of the Reserve or National Guard that have performed three years of satisfactory duty with such service being free of disciplinary action.
- Status: Current
- Established: 1925 (Selected Marine Corps Reserve Medal); 1962 (Naval Reserve Meritorious Service Medal); 1963 (Coast Guard Reserve Good Conduct Medal); 1964 (Air Reserve Forces Meritorious Service Medal); 1971 (Army Reserve Components Achievement Medal)
- Final award: 2014 (Naval Reserve Meritorious Service Medal until its discontinuation)
- Army, Marine Corps, Air Reserve, and Coast Guard ribbons.

Precedence
- Next (higher): Good Conduct Medal
- Next (lower): Army: Mexican Border Service Medal; Navy Navy Expeditionary Medal; Marine Corps: Marine Corps Expeditionary Medal; Air Force: Outstanding Airman of the Year Ribbon; Coast Guard: Navy Occupation Service Medal

A Reserve Good Conduct Medal refers to any one of the five military conduct awards, four of which are currently issued and one of which was previously issued, by the United States Armed Forces to members of the Reserve and National Guard. The primary difference between the regular Good Conduct Medal and the Reserve Good Conduct Medal is that the regular Good Conduct Medal is only issued for active duty service while the reserve equivalent is bestowed for reserve duties such as drills, annual training, and additional active duty for either training or operational support to the active duty force or, in the case of the Army National Guard and Air National Guard, in support of Title 32 U.S.C. state active duty (SAD) such as disaster response and relief.

To receive a Reserve Good Conduct Medal, a service member (excluding Army Reservists), must, generally, be an active member of the Reserve or National Guard and must have performed three to four years of satisfactory duty (to include drills and annual training) with such service being free of disciplinary action. Periods of active duty in the Active Component prior to joining the Reserve Component, full-time active duty in an Active Guard and Reserve, Training and Administration of the Reserve (TAR), Full Time Support (FTS), or active duty recall or mobilization in excess of three years are not typically creditable towards a Reserve Good Conduct Medal, although such periods are typically creditable for the active duty equivalent Good Conduct Medal. Each service has specific varying requirements.

== U.S. Army Reserve Components Achievement Medal ==
The last of the Reserve Good Conduct Medals to be authorized, the U.S. Army Reserve Components Achievement Medal (ARCAM), was established by the Secretary of the Army on 3 March 1971 and amended by Department of the Army General Orders 4, in 1974. The Army Reserve Components Achievement Medal was originally awarded for exemplary behavior, efficiency, and fidelity while serving as a member of an Army National Guard or Army Reserve Troop Program Unit (TPU) for each four-year period of consecutive service completed on or after 3 March 1972. Effective 28 March 1995, the period of qualifying service for the award was reduced from four years to three years; however, this change was not retroactive. Additional awards of the ARCAM are indicated by bronze and silver oak leaf clusters.

Service must have been consecutive, and service performed in the Reserve Component of the U.S. Air Force, Navy, Marine Corps, or Coast Guard may not be credited for award of this medal. The member must have exhibited honest and faithful service in accordance with the standards of conduct, courage, and duty required by the law and customs of the service of a member of the same grade as the individual to whom the standard is being applied. A member must be recommended for the award by his or her unit commander whose recommendation is based on personal knowledge of the individual and the individual's official records of periods of service under prior commanders during the period for which the award is made. Furthermore, a commander may not delay award or extend the qualifying period for misconduct. A determination that service is not honorable as prescribed negates the entire period of the award.

Soldiers who are ordered to active duty in the Active Guard and Reserve (AGR) program will be awarded the ARCAM if they have completed two of the three years required (Good Conduct Medal eligibility starts on the effective date of the AGR order). Soldiers with less than two years will not receive an award. Service lost may be recovered if the soldier is separated honorably from the AGR program and reverts to troop program unit service, for example, a soldier serves one year and six months of qualifying service and is ordered to an AGR tour. This service is not sufficient for award of the ARCAM. When the Soldier leaves the AGR program that one year and six months is granted towards the next award of the ARCAM. Only the State Adjutant General may determine that the AGR service was not sufficiently honorable enough to revoke the previously earned time, regardless of the type of separation given.

The ARCAM is awarded to both officer and enlisted members of the Army Reserve and Army National Guard (all enlisted ranks are eligible as well as officer ranks up to colonel) and has basically the same criteria as the other Reserve Services for award of a Reserve Good Conduct Medal. The Armed Forces Reserve Medal (AFRM) is a similar award, established in 1950, which is given for ten years of honorable reserve service (consecutive without a break in service) and is presented to both officers and enlisted personnel.

== Naval Reserve Meritorious Service Medal ==
First created in 1962 with retroactive presentation to 1958, it remained an active decoration in the U.S. Navy until its discontinuation in 2014.

The Naval Reserve Meritorious Service Medal was considered the enlisted successor award to the previous Naval Reserve Medal. From 1958 until 1996, the medal was awarded for four years of satisfactory enlisted reserve service as a drilling reservist in the Selected Reserve (SELRES) or Individual Ready Reserve (IRR), to include Volunteer Training Units (VTU).

Full-time active duty enlisted personnel in the Naval Reserve's Training and Administration of the Reserve (TAR) Program (renamed the Full Time Support (FTS) Program from 2005 to 2021), while also eligible for the Naval Reserve Medal, were not eligible for the Naval Reserve Meritorious Service Medal and were awarded the Navy Good Conduct Medal on par with active duty Regular Navy enlisted personnel.

The years of service requirement for the Naval Reserve Meritorious Service Medal dropped from four years of service to three years of service from 1997 until its discontinuation, synchronizing it with the reduction in the required service for the active duty Navy Good Conduct Medal, which replaced it entirely pursuant to a SECNAV directive in 2014. As a result of this SECNAV directive, all enlisted sailors in both the Active Component and the Reserve Component now receive the same good conduct medal for the same period of service.

Additional awards of the Naval Reserve Meritorious Service Medal are denoted by service stars. This was strictly an enlisted service medal on par with Navy Good Conduct Medal for active duty enlisted sailors, to include those active duty enlisted sailors in the renamed U.S. Navy Reserve's Full Time Support (FTS) program, previously known as Training and Administration of the Reserve (TAR) prior to 2005, with FTS redesignated again as TAR in 2021. Commissioned officers, to include chief warrant officers, were not eligible for award of the Naval Reserve Meritorious Service Medal.

== Air Reserve Forces Meritorious Service Medal ==
Designed by Thomas Hudson Jones and originally established on April 1, 1964 as the "Air Force Reserve Ribbon" by Secretary of the Air Force Eugene M. Zuckert, the award became a full sized medal, under its current name, on November 2, 1971 under Secretary of the Air Force Robert C. Seamans, Jr. From 1965 to 1974, the award was presented for four years of honorable reserve enlisted service in the Air Force Reserve or Air National Guard, however the time limit was lowered to three years of service beginning on July 1, 1975. Additional awards of the Air Reserve Forces Meritorious Service Medal are denoted with oak leaf clusters. This is strictly an enlisted service award on par with the Air Force Good Conduct Medal for active duty enlisted airmen in the Regular Air Force. Commissioned officers are not eligible for award of the Air Reserve Forces Meritorious Service Medal.

== Selected Marine Corps Reserve Medal ==
First created in 1925 as the Fleet Marine Reserve Medal, this is the oldest of the Reserve Good Conduct Medals. In 1939 the name of the medal was changed to the Organized Marine Corps Reserve Medal. In 1984, the award adopted its current name. As of January 1, 1996, the qualifying period of service was changed from four to three years to mirror the requirements of the Good Conduct Medal. Additional awards are denoted by bronze or silver service stars.

== Coast Guard Reserve Good Conduct Medal ==
Created in 1963 and awarded for a standard satisfactory enlisted reserve tour of three years of duty. Additional awards are denoted by service stars. This is strictly an enlisted service award on par with the Coast Guard Good Conduct Medal for active duty enlisted coast guardsmen. Commissioned officers, to include warrant officers, are not eligible for award of the Coast Guard Reserve Good Conduct Medal, however, they are entitled to wear the award if it was earned during prior enlisted service.

== See also ==
- Awards and decorations of the United States military
- Awards and decorations of the United States Army
- List of military decorations
