= Naval Reserve Medal =

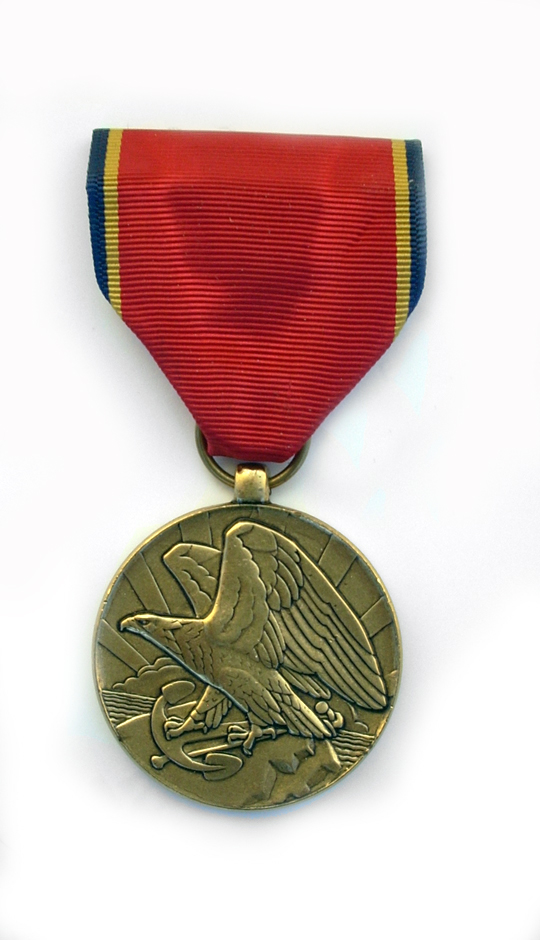
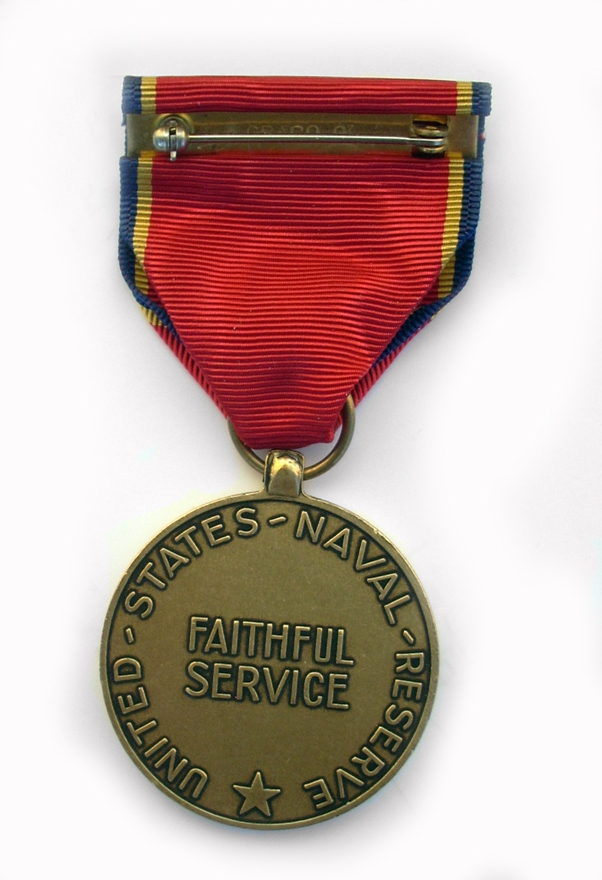
- Type: service medal
- Awarded for: 10 years of service in the USNR, National Naval Volunteers, or local naval militia
- Presented by: Department of the Navy
- First award: 12 September 1938
- Final award: 12 September 1958
- ribbon

Precedence
- Next (higher): Armed Forces Reserve Medal
- Next (lower): Philippine Presidential Unit Citation

The Naval Reserve Medal (NRM) was a decoration of the United States Navy which was created by order of Secretary of the Navy Claude A. Swanson on 12 September 1938. The medal was first issued in 1938 and was an active award until 1958. On 12 September 1958, the Naval Reserve Medal was declared discontinued and was replaced by the Armed Forces Reserve Medal. It is not to be confused with the Naval Reserve Meritorious Service Medal which is a different award that was discontinued on 1 January 2014.

The Naval Reserve Medal was awarded to any commissioned officer or enlisted member of United States Naval Reserve (USNR), the associated National Naval Volunteers, and local naval militia units of the period. To be awarded the decoration, a service member was required to perform ten years of continuous service in one of the aforementioned components in either an active duty, drilling reservist, or inactive status.

An additional award of the NRM is denoted by a service star. The United States Marine Corps equivalent to the award is the Marine Corps Reserve Ribbon. The Naval Reserve Medal originally held precedence just below that of the Navy Good Conduct Medal which, in turn, held precedence just below unit awards. Sometime after 1958, the precedence of the Naval Reserve Medal was moved to rank just below the Armed Forces Reserve Medal, making it the lowest ranking medal awarded by the United States Armed Forces aside from the Navy and Coast Guard expert marksmanship medals.

As the NRM was only available for exactly 20 years, and required 10 years of USNR service, no sailor could possibly receive more than two. Additionally, with World War II (WW II) pulling the vast majority of Naval Reservists into active duty the Regular Navy, the number of sailors to receive two NRMs is very low, with all two-time recipients having had to serve a total of 20 years in the Naval Reserve between September 1938 and September 1958, e.g., before, during and after WW II. Therefore, most one-time recipients served in the USNR after WW II in the 1946-1958 window.
