= Transportation Distinguished Service Medal =

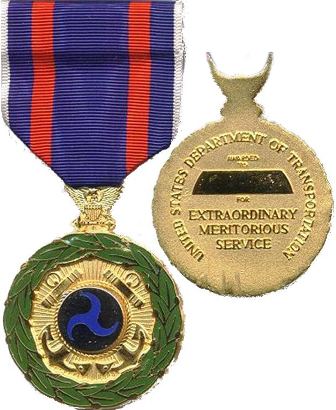
- Transportation Distinguished Service Medal
- Type: Military medal Distinguished service medal
- Presented by: Department of Transportation
- Eligibility: Members of the United States Coast Guard
- Status: Replaced by Homeland Security Distinguished Service Medal in 2003
- Established: Executive Order 12824, December 7, 1992, (amended by Executive Order 13286, February 28, 2003, Executive Order 13569, April 5, 2011).
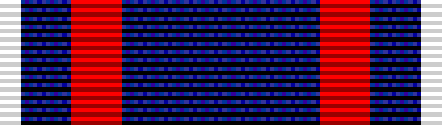
- Transportation Distinguished Service Medal ribbon

Order of Wear
- Next (higher): Homeland Security Distinguished Service Medal
- Next (lower): Coast Guard Distinguished Service Medal

The Transportation Distinguished Service Medal was the highest decoration which could be bestowed by the Secretary of Transportation for exceptional service to the United States government in a position of great responsibility to a member of the United States Coast Guard. In 2003 it was replaced by the Homeland Security Distinguished Service Medal.

The Department of Transportation Distinguished Service Medal was established by Executive Order 12824 signed by President George H. W. Bush on December 7, 1992. The decoration was awarded to any member of the Coast Guard who provided exceptionally meritorious service in a duty of great responsibility while assigned in the Department of Transportation, or in other activities under the responsibility of the Secretary of Transportation, either national or international, as may be assigned by the Secretary.

With the creation of the Department of Homeland Security in 2003 and transfer of the Coast Guard to it, the award was changed to become the Homeland Security Distinguished Service Medal, issued by the Secretary of Homeland Security.

== See also ==
- Awards and decorations of the United States Coast Guard
- Obsolete military awards of the United States
