= European–African–Middle Eastern Campaign Medal =

American campaign medal

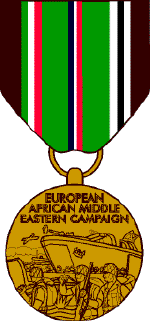
- Obverse
- Type: Military medal Campaign medal
- Presented by: Department of War and Department of the Navy
- Eligibility: served in the armed forces between the following dates: between December 7, 1941, and March 2, 1946, for military service, in geographical theater areas of Europe, North Africa, or the Middle East.
- Reverse
- Status: Inactive
- First award: December 7, 1941
- Final award: March 2, 1946
- Ribbon and streamer

Precedence
- Next (higher): American Defense Service Medal
- Equivalent: Asiatic–Pacific Campaign Medal; American Campaign Medal
- Next (lower): World War II Victory Medal

The European–African–Middle Eastern Campaign Medal was a military award of the United States Armed Forces which was first created on November 6, 1942, by Executive Order 9265 issued by President Franklin D. Roosevelt. The medal was intended to recognize those military service members who had performed military duty in the European Theater (to include North Africa and the Middle East) during the years of the Second World War.

== History ==
The EAME Campaign Medal was initially established by Executive Order 9265, dated 6 November 1942, by President Franklin D. Roosevelt, and announced in War Department Bulletin 56, 1942. The European–African–Middle Eastern Campaign Medal was awarded as a service ribbon throughout the entire Second World War due to the ribbon design being approved by the Secretary of War in December 1942.

The medal design was submitted to the Commission of Fine Arts on 17 September 1946 and the first sample was completed in July 1947. The first recipient of the European–African–Middle Eastern Campaign Medal was General of the Army Dwight Eisenhower on 24 July 1947 in recognition of his service as Supreme Commander of the Allied Expeditionary Force during World War II.

The criteria were initially announced in Department of the Army (DA) Circular 84, dated 25 March 1948, and subsequently published in Army Regulation 600–65, dated 22 September 1948. The Pacific Theater counterpart to the European–African–Middle Eastern Campaign Medal was the Asiatic–Pacific Campaign Medal.

== Criteria ==
Originally known as the "EAME Ribbon", the European–African–Middle Eastern Campaign Medal is awarded for any service performed between December 7, 1941, and March 2, 1946, inclusive, provided such service was performed in the following geographical theater areas: West boundary. -- From the North Pole, south along the 75th meridian west longitude to the 77th parallel north latitude, thence southeast through Davis Strait to the intersection of the 40th parallel north latitude and the 35th meridian west longitude, thence south along that meridian to the 10th parallel north latitude, thence southeast to the intersection of the equator and the 20th meridian west longitude, thence along the 20th meridian west longitude to the South Pole. East boundary—From the North Pole, south along the 60th meridian east longitude to its intersection with the eastern border of Iran, thence south along that border to the Gulf of Oman and the intersection of the 60th meridian east longitude, thence south along the 60th meridian east longitude to the South Pole.

== Appearance ==
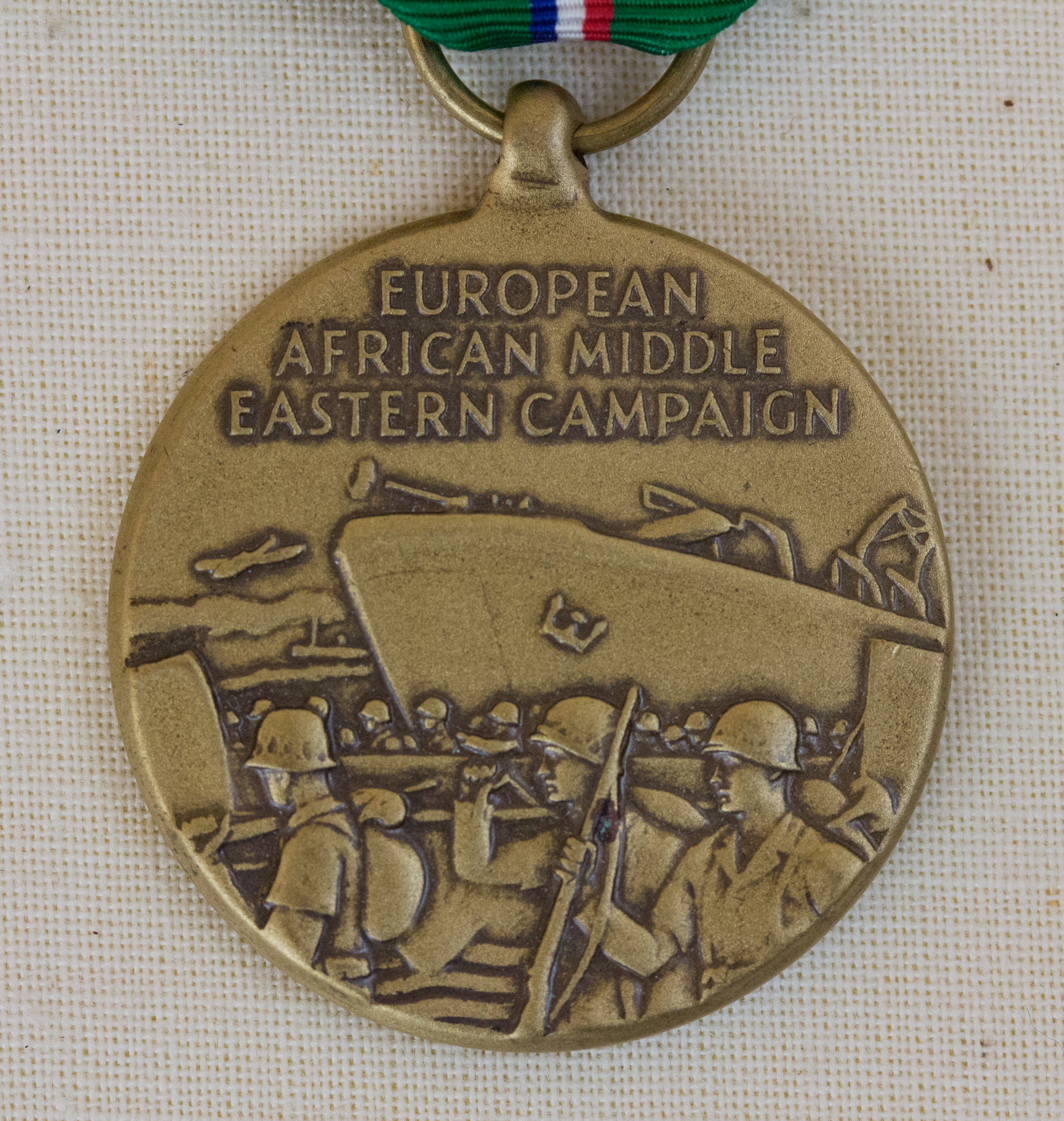
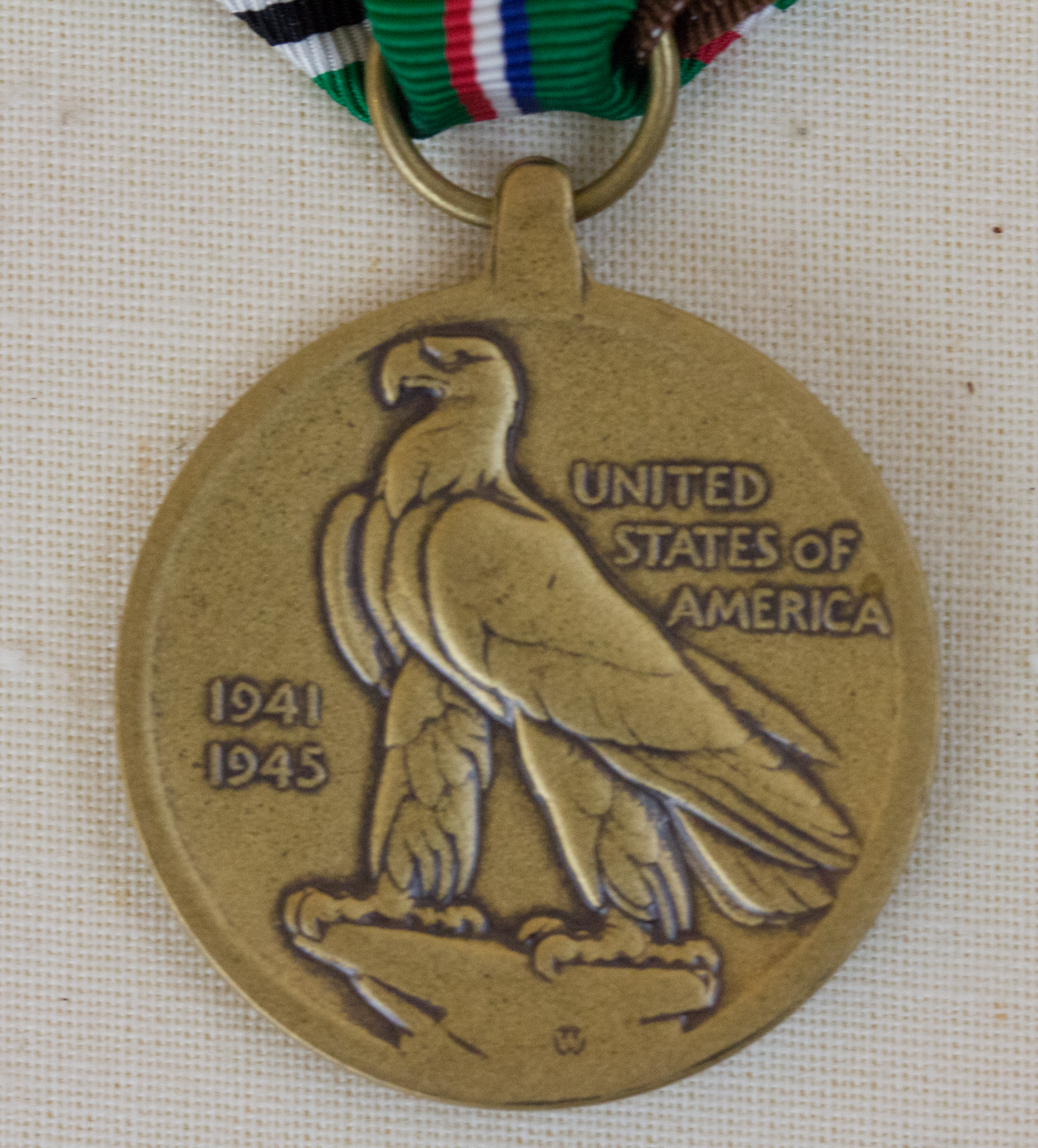

The medal's obverse was designed by Mr. Thomas Hudson Jones based on General Eisenhower's request that the medal include an invasion scene. The reverse side was designed by Adolph Alexander Weinman and is the same design as used on the reverse of the Asiatic–Pacific and American Campaign Medals.

The Bronze medal is 1 3/8 inches (35 mm) in diameter. On the obverse is a LST landing craft and troops landing under fire with an airplane in the background below the words EUROPEAN AFRICAN MIDDLE EASTERN CAMPAIGN. On the reverse, an American bald eagle close between the dates 1941 - 1945 and the words UNITED STATES OF AMERICA.

The ribbon is 1 3/8 inches (35 mm) wide and consists of the following stripes:

- 3/16 in (4.8 mm) Brown 67136 which represents the sands of Africa;
- 1/16 in (1.6 mm) each of Irish Green 67189, White 67101 and Scarlet 67111, representing Italy;
- 1/4 in (6.4 mm) Irish Green represents the green fields of Europe;
- 1/24 in (1.1 mm) each of Old Glory Blue 67178, White and Scarlet, taken from the American Defense Service Medal ribbon and refers to the continuance of American Defense after Pearl Harbor;
- 1/4 in (6.4 mm) Irish Green, again representing the green fields of Europe;
- 1/16 in (1.6 mm) each White, Black 67138, and White representing Germany; and lastly
- 3/16 in (4.8 mm) Brown, again representing the sands of Africa.

== Devices ==
For those service members who participated in one or more designated military campaigns, campaign stars are authorized to be worn on the medal. The Arrowhead device is also authorized to be worn on the medal for those who participated in airborne or amphibious assault landings. The Fleet Marine Force Combat Operation Insignia is also authorized for wear on the medal for sailors attached to the Marine Corps.

== US Army Campaigns ==
The following military campaigns are recognized by campaign stars on the European–African–Middle Eastern Campaign Medal.

Military Campaigns
Name of campaign	Start date	End date
Egypt-Libya	11 June 1942	12 February 1943
Air Offensive, Europe	4 July 1942	5 June 1944
Algeria-French Morocco	8 November 1942	11 November 1942
Tunisia	12 November 1942	13 May 1943
Sicily	14 May 1943	17 August 1943
Naples-Foggia	18 August 1943	21 January 1944
Anzio	22 January 1944	24 May 1944
Rome-Arno	22 January 1944	9 September 1944
Normandy	6 June 1944	24 July 1944
Northern France	25 July 1944	14 September 1944
Southern France	15 August 1944	14 September 1944
Northern Apennines	10 September 1944	4 April 1945
Rhineland	15 September 1944	21 March 1945
Ardennes-Alsace	16 December 1944	25 January 1945
Central Europe	22 March 1945	11 May 1945
Po Valley	5 April 1945	8 May 1945

For those service members who saw combat but did not participate in a designated campaign, the following "blanket campaigns" are authorized to the European–African–Middle Eastern Campaign Medal, denoted by campaign stars.

- Antisubmarine 7 Dec 41 - 8 May 1945
- Ground Combat 7 Dec 41 - 8 May 1945
- Air Combat: 7 Dec 41 - 8 May 1945

== US Navy Campaigns ==
The nine officially recognized US Navy campaigns in the European Theater of Operations are:

- North African occupation: allied landings in North Africa
- Sicilian occupation: allied landings in Sicily
- Salerno landings: allied landings in Southern Italy
- West Coast of Italy operations (1944): allied landing at Anzio and subsequent supply of the Anzio beachhead
- Invasion of Normandy: allied landings in Normandy
- Northeast Greenland operation
- Invasion of Southern France: allied landings in Southern France
- Reinforcement of Malta: allied convoys to supply besieged Malta
- Escort, antisubmarine, armed guard and special operations: 7 December 1941 – 2 September 1945

== See also ==
- Arrowhead device
- Awards and decorations of the United States military
- Coast and Geodetic Survey Atlantic War Zone Medal
- Merchant Marine Atlantic War Zone Medal
