= Enlistment Bar =

US military award

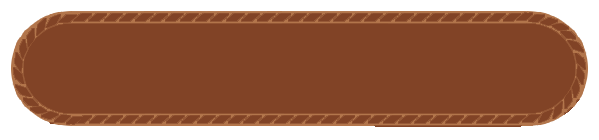
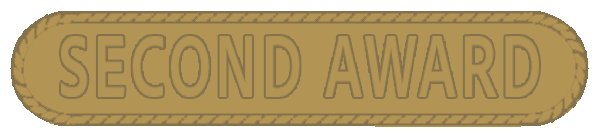
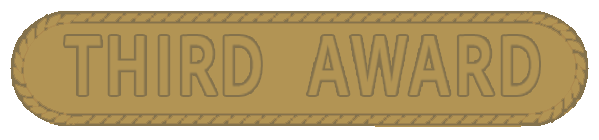
- Type: Ribbon Device
- Awarded for: Navy and USMC reenlistment
- Sponsored by: United States Navy
- Status: Not currently awarded
- Related: Good conduct loop

An Enlistment Bar is an obsolete award device of the United States Department of the Navy and United States Coast Guard which was previously awarded as an attachment to the Good Conduct Medal. An enlistment bar was similar in appearance to a campaign clasp. The bar was originally brass engraved with the number of the enlistment by a private engraver, not standardized. Around World War II, the Navy began adding Second Award, Third Award, etc. to the bars. The U.S. Navy, United States Marine Corps, and United States Coast Guard were the only services to ever use enlistment bars.

== See also ==
- Awards and decorations of the United States military
- United States military award devices
- Good Conduct Loop
