= Army of Puerto Rican Occupation Medal =

US military medal

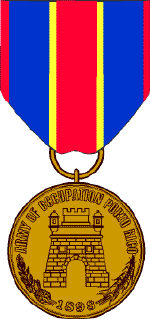
- Obverse
- Type: Service medal
- Awarded for: Service members who performed military occupation duty in Puerto Rico after the close of the Spanish–American War
- Presented by: Department of War
- Status: Obsolete
- Established: 4 February 1919
- First award: 14 August 1898
- Final award: 10 December 1898
- Service ribbon of the medal

Precedence
- Next (higher): Army of Cuban Occupation Medal
- Next (lower): Philippine Campaign Medal

The Army of Puerto Rican Occupation Medal was a service medal of the United States Army which was created by order of the United States War Department on 4 February 1919. A retrospective award created decades after the action commemorated, the medal recognized Army service from 14 August through 10 December 1898 in Puerto Rico. The Army of Puerto Rican Occupation Medal was commemorative by nature although was approved for wear on active military uniforms. A similar medal, the Army of Cuban Occupation Medal was created for occupation service in Cuba following the Spanish–American War. The regulations for the Army of Cuban Occupation Medal were re-written to include regulations for the Army of Puerto Rican Occupation Medal.

== Background ==
Service in Puerto Rico during the Spanish American War was recognized initially by the Spanish Campaign Medal. This medal recognized service between 24 July 1898 and 13 August 1898, as well as those who were embarked on ships headed there during the specified period of time. With the last date of recognition being 13 August, there were some troops who received no medal for their service in Puerto Rico during the immediate period after the end of the Spanish–American War. A similar lack of recognition for service in Cuba was remedied by the creation of the Army of Cuban Occupation Medal in 1915. On 4 February 1919 the order establishing the Army of Cuban Occupation Medal was modified to add regulations and criteria for awarding a service badge for time served in Puerto Rico between 14 August – 10 December 1898. The regulations allowed the awarding of the medals, at government expense, only to those officers and enlisted men who were still actively serving on or after 28 June 1915. Those who had left the service were able to apply for a certificate verifying service from the War Department and then purchase a medal, at cost, after providing the proof of service certificate. It wasn't until an act of congress in 1928 that the War Department was authorized to issue to all those entitled, and their next of kin, any medals to which they might be entitled to include the Army of Puerto Rican Occupation Medal.

== Criteria ==
The medal recognized those service members who had performed military occupation duty in Puerto Rico after the close of the Spanish–American War. For those service members who performed duty both during and subsequent to the Spanish–American War, the Spanish Campaign Medal was also authorized. The qualifying dates for the Army of Puerto Rican Occupation Medal were from 14 August through 10 December 1898. The United States Navy and Marine Corps had no equivalent to the Army of Puerto Rican Occupation Medal.

== Appearance ==
Obverse of medal

The Army of Puerto Rican Occupation Medal is bronze 1 1/4 inches wide. It has an oxidized matte finish in relief. The obverse of the medal bears a castle in the center with two small round towers at the corners. This obverse is also used on the obverse of the Spanish Campaign Medal. At the top around the outside of the medal is the inscription ARMY OF OCCUPATION OF PORTO RICO (the "Puerto Rico" of the country was spelled using conventions of the time). The date 1898 appears at the bottom. On the left side of the date is a branch of a tobacco plant on the other side is a stalk of sugar cane. The reverse depicts a spread eagle on a trophy consisting of a cannon, six rifles, four standards, an Indian shield, quiver of arrows with three spears, a Cuban machete, and Sulu kris. Below the trophy are the words FOR SERVICE. The reverse is circumscribed by the words UNITED STATES ARMY at the upper half and thirteen five-pointed stars in the lower half. The ribbon is 1 3/8 inches wide in ultramarine blue. At the edges are stripes of old glory red 1/16 inches wide. In the center is a 3/8 inch stripe of old glory red bordered on both sides by 1/16 inch golden yellow stripes.
