= Army of Cuban Occupation Medal =

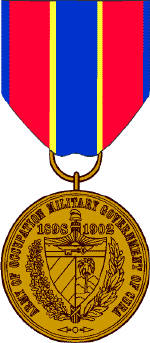
- Obverse
- Type: Service medal
- Awarded for: Service members who performed garrison occupation duty in Cuba, following the close of the Spanish–American War
- Presented by: Department of War
- Status: Obsolete
- Established: 28 June 1915
- Service ribbon of the medal

Precedence
- Next (higher): Spanish War Service Medal
- Next (lower): Army of Puerto Rican Occupation Medal

The Army of Cuban Occupation Medal was a military award created by the United States War Department in June 1915. The medal recognizes those service members who performed garrison occupation duty in the United States Protectorate over Cuba, following the close of the Spanish–American War.

== Criteria ==
The Army of Cuban Occupation Medal was established by War Department General Order 40, in June 1915. To be awarded the Army of Cuban Occupation Medal, a service member must have served within the geographical borders of Cuba between 18 July 1898 and 20 May 1902. The medal was primarily awarded to members of the United States Army, but was available to other branches of service under certain circumstances.

The first Army of Cuban Occupation Medal was awarded to Major General Leonard Wood. The Army of Cuban Pacification Medal was a similarly named decoration, but was awarded for the withdrawal of U.S. forces from Cuba seven years after the close of the Spanish–American War.

== Appearance ==
The medal is a circular bronze disc 1 3/8 inches in diameter. On the obverse is the Coat of arms of Cuba. Around the edge is the inscription ARMY OF OCCUPATION MILITARY GOVERNMENT OF CUBA. The dates 1898 and 1902 are on either side of the Phrygian cap at the top of the coat of arms.

The reverse depicts a spread winged eagle perched upon a trophy of a cannon, rifles, war flags, an Indian shield, quiver of arrows and three spears, a Cuban machete and Sulu kris. Below the trophy are the words FOR SERVICE. Above the eagle are the words arched around the edge UNITED STATES ARMY. In the lower half at the edge are thirteen five-pointed stars.

The medal is suspended from a ribbon 1 3/8 inches wide. It is composed of the following vertical stripes: 1/16 inch ultramarine Blue; 3/8 inch old glory red; 1/16 inch golden yellow; 3/8 inch ultramarine blue; 1/16 inch golden yellow; 3/8 inch old glory ged; and 1/16 inch ultramarine blue.

== See also ==
- United States Protectorate over Cuba

== Bibliography ==
- Foster, Frank C. (2002). A Complete Guide to All United States Military Medals, 1939 to Present. Fountain Inn, S.C.: MOA Press. ISBN 1-884452-18-3. OCLC 54755134.
- Kerrigan, Evans E. (1971). American War Medals and Decorations. New York: Viking Press. ISBN 0-670-12101-0. OCLC 128058.
- Kerrigan, Evans E. (1990). American Medals and Decorations. Noroton Heights, CT: Medallic. ISBN 0-7924-5082-5. OCLC 21467942.
- Robles, Philip K. (1971). United States Military Medals and Ribbons. Rutland, VT: C. E. Tuttle. ISBN 0-8048-0048-0. OCLC 199721.
