= Marine Corps Reserve Ribbon =

- Marine Corps Reserve Ribbon
- Type: Ribbon
- Presented by: Department of the Navy
- Status: Obsolete

The Marine Corps Reserve Ribbon was a service ribbon of the United States Marine Corps which was issued between the December 17, 1945, and December 17, 1965. The ribbon was first created by Secretary of the Navy James Forrestal and recognizes those members of the Marine Corps Reserve who performed ten years of honorable reserve service.

To be awarded the Marine Corps Reserve Ribbon, a Marine Reservist must have performed ten years of reserve duty in an "active drill status", implying satisfactory attendance at weekend drills and participation in yearly two week training periods. The ten years of service may be cumulative over a twelve-year period. The Marine Corps Reserve Ribbon is not awarded to members of the inactive reserves or Marine Corps reservists who were called to full-time active duty.

The Marine Corps Reserve ribbon was declared obsolete in 1965 and was succeeded by the Armed Forces Reserve Medal. The U.S. Navy equivalent of the Marine Corps Reserve Ribbon was the Naval Reserve Medal.
