= Armed Forces Reserve Medal =

United States military service award

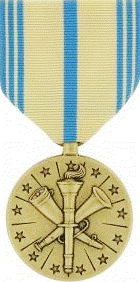
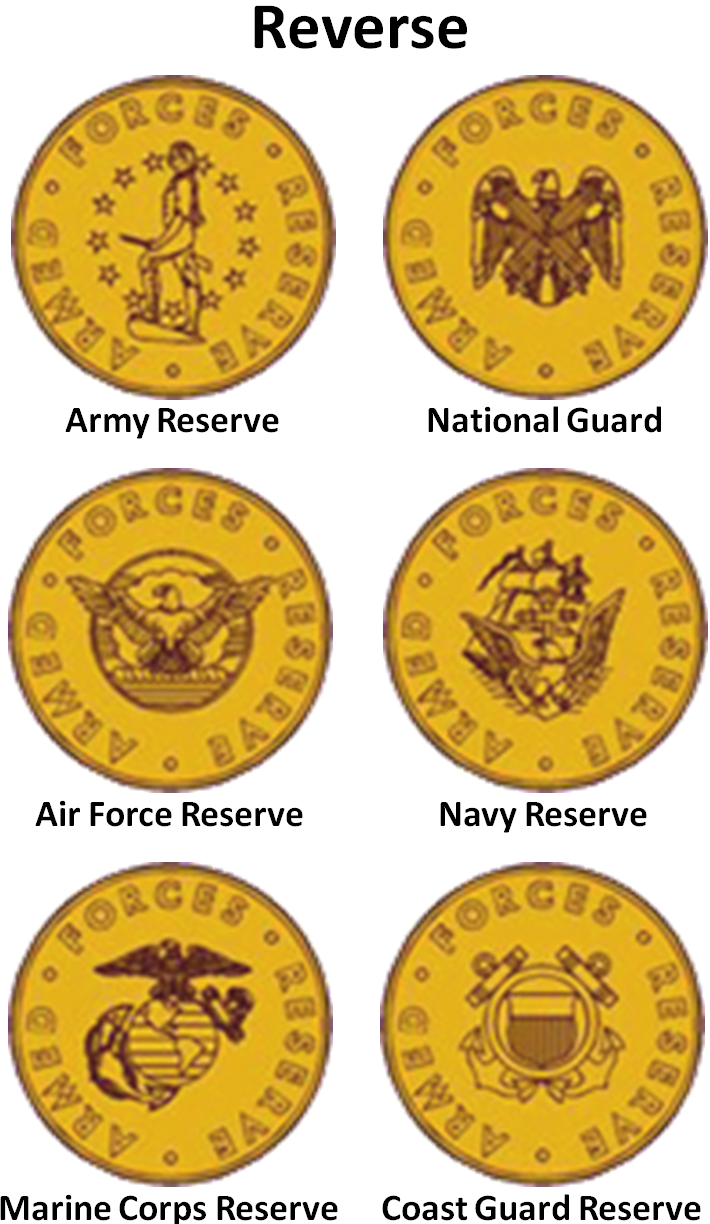
- Armed Forces Reserve Medal
- Type: Service Medal
- Presented by: Department of Defense; Department of Homeland Security
- Eligibility: Officers and enlisted personnel of the US Armed Forces reserve components
- Status: Active
- Established: EO 10163, September 25, 1950, as amended
- Armed Forces Reserve Medal service ribbon

Precedence
- Next (higher): Army: Army Sea Duty Ribbon; Navy: Navy Basic Military Training Honor Graduate Ribbon; Air and Space Forces: Developmental Special Duty Ribbon; Marine Corps: Marine Corps Combat Instructor Ribbon; Coast Guard: Coast Guard Recruiting Service Ribbon
- Next (lower): Army: NCO Professional Development Ribbon; Navy & Coast Guard: Naval Reserve Medal; Air and Space Forces: NCO PME Graduate Ribbon; Marine Corps: Marine Corps Reserve Ribbon

The Armed Forces Reserve Medal (AFRM) is a service medal of the United States Armed Forces that has existed since 1958. The medal recognizes service performed by members of the reserve components and is awarded to both officers and enlisted personnel. The medal is considered a successor award to the Naval Reserve Medal and the Marine Corps Reserve Ribbon, which were discontinued in 1958 and 1965, respectively.

If the medal is awarded for periods of service, it is accompanied by an hourglass device. Depending on the length of service, a bronze, silver, gold, or bronze and gold hourglass are worn on the suspension ribbon and service ribbon, indicating 10, 20, 30, or 40 years of service, respectively.

If the medal is awarded in connection with a mobilization, it is accompanied by an "M" device. Subsequent mobilizations under an unrelated presidential call-up order result in a numeral device being worn to indicate the number of mobilizations.

== For service – the Hourglass device ==
In the Army Reserve and National Guard, a service member qualifies for the medal after completing a total of ten years' service in the active reserve. This service may be cumulative, provided that the combined ten years of service was performed over a period of twelve consecutive years. Voluntary recalls to active duty are not counted within the ten years of service. In addition, unlike the Reserve Good Conduct Medal, a service member's disciplinary history is not a factor when awarding the Armed Forces Reserve Medal. In the Navy Reserve, members of the Individual Ready Reserve are eligible for the medal after 10 years of service. Commissioned officers with reserve commissions serving on active duty for 10 years or longer are eligible for the Armed Forces Reserve Medal.

Periods of service for the Armed Forces Reserve Medal are denoted through the use of the hourglass device. The length of the period for which the Armed Forces Reserve Medal is awarded is indicated using a bronze hourglass, silver hourglass, gold hourglass, or bronze and gold hourglasses together. The initial presentation of the Armed Forces Reserve Medal is authorized with the bronze hourglass device denoting ten years of reserve service. At twenty years of service, the hourglass is upgraded to silver, and at thirty years the hourglass becomes gold. For those who complete forty years of reserve service, both the gold and bronze hourglass devices are worn simultaneously. This is the only case where hourglasses are worn together; in all other cases the hourglass device is upgraded to the next higher award degree and is worn as a single device.

Type	Hourglass Device	Years of service	Example
Bronze		10	Bronze Hourglass Device
Silver		20	Silver Hourglass Device
Gold		30	Gold Hourglass Device
Bronze and Gold		40	Bronze and Gold Hourglass Devices

Prior to Executive Order 13013 issued on August 6, 1996, a bronze hourglass device was presented only upon the second and subsequent awards of the Armed Forces Reserve Medal, as in a bronze hourglass for twenty years of service, two bronze hourglasses for thirty, and three bronze hourglasses for forty. Executive Order 13013 provided awarding a bronze hourglass after 10 years' service, a silver hourglass after 20 years, and a gold hourglass after 30 years. Personnel discharged or retired, prior to the change of the Hourglass Device award criteria, are not eligible for a correction of records or an upgrade of the Hourglass Device, as the Hourglass Device would have originally been presented under the original award specifications.

Number of bronze devices	Years of service	Example
0	10	
1	20	
2	30	
3	40	

== For mobilization – the "M" device ==
AFRM ribbon with silver Hourglass Device and two awards of the Mobilization Device

The Armed Forces Reserve Medal is also awarded to any member of the Reserve or National Guard who is involuntarily mobilized for a contingency operation under Title 10 or Title 14, or volunteers for federal active duty during any such mobilization. In such cases, the medal with an "M" device (for mobilization) are both awarded together without regard to the period or length of service. The "M" device is a bronze "M" quarter of an inch in height.

Subsequent mobilizations for a different executive order call-up authorize a numeral device ("2", "3", etc.), sometimes called an award numeral, to be worn with the initial "M" device on the service ribbon and suspension ribbon of the medal. However, in the Army, multiple deployments for different operations during a call-up for the same executive order only qualify for a single award of the "M" device. For example, if a soldier mobilized multiple times under Executive Order 13223, once for Operation ENDURING FREEDOM and twice for Operation IRAQI FREEDOM, the soldier would still only be awarded one "M" device despite having been mobilized three times.

If no "M" device is authorized, the appropriate hourglass shall be positioned in the center of the ribbon. If no hourglass is authorized, the "M" device shall be positioned in the center of the ribbon, followed by Arabic numerals indicating the number of times the device has been awarded (e.g., 2 to 99—no number is worn for the first award). If both the hourglass and the "M" device are awarded, the hourglass(es) shall be positioned in first position on the ribbon (at the wearer's right), the "M" device in middle position, and the number of times the "M" device has been awarded in the remaining position (at the wearer's left).

=== Authorized Operation ===
The table below lists designated U.S. military operations that have been approved for award of the "M’ device on the AFRM under the provisions of Section 12301 of Title 10, U.S.C, provided the member meets other award criteria designated contained in DoDM 1348.33, Volume 2, Manual of Military Decorations and Awards: DoD Service Awards – Campaign, Expeditionary, and Service Medals. The Military Departments are responsible for determining individual eligibility for the "M" device based on award criteria. Please refer individual eligibility questions to your respective Military Department.

Operation(s)	Location
DESERT SHIELD and DESERT STORM	Persian Gulf
RESTORE HOPE	Somalia
UPHOLD DEMOCRACY	Haiti
JOINT ENDEAVOR, JOINT GUARD, and JOINT FORGE	Bosnia
DESERT FOX, NORTHERN WATCH, and SOUTHERN WATCH	Persian Gulf
ALLIED FORCE	Kosovo
NOBLE EAGLE, ENDURING FREEDOM, IRAQI FREEDOM, NEW DAWN, FREEDOM'S SENTINEL, and INHERENT RESOLVE	war on terrorism
NOTE 1: Multiple periods of service during one designated contingency shall count as one "M" device award. NOTE 2: Even if an operation is not officially named but it results in an involuntary call to active duty, the AFRM with "M" device is authorized.

== See also ==
- United States military award devices
