= United States service medals of the world wars =

United States service medals of the world wars are U.S. military medals which were created solely for recognizing service in the First World War and World War II. Such medals are no longer awarded, but are still referred to in various publications, manuals, and award precedence charts as many veterans still display them as part of veteran functions and ceremonies.

The following service medals were awarded for service in the world wars and for occupational duty following the end of each war.

== Service medals ==
=== Victory medals ===
World War I Victory Medal

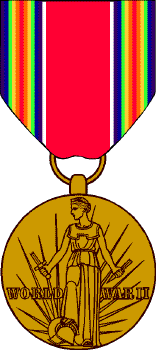
World War II Victory Medal

=== Service medals ===
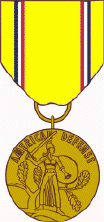
American Defense Service Medal

Women's Army Corps Service Medal

=== Campaign medals ===
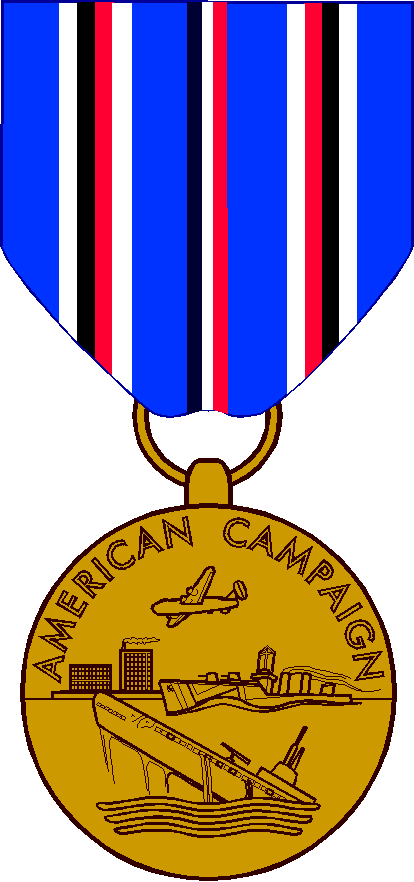
American Campaign Medal

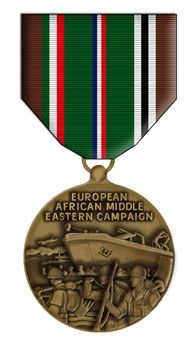
European-African-Middle Eastern Campaign Medal

Asiatic-Pacific Campaign Medal

=== Occupation medals ===
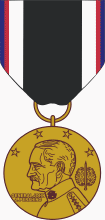
Army of Occupation of Germany Medal

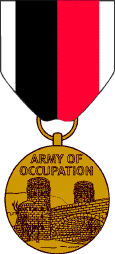
Army of Occupation Medal

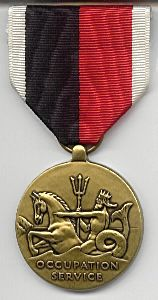
Navy Occupation Service Medal

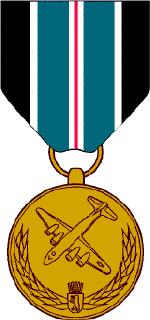
Medal for Humane Action
