= Barbara Bodine =

American international relations scholar and former diplomat (born 1948)

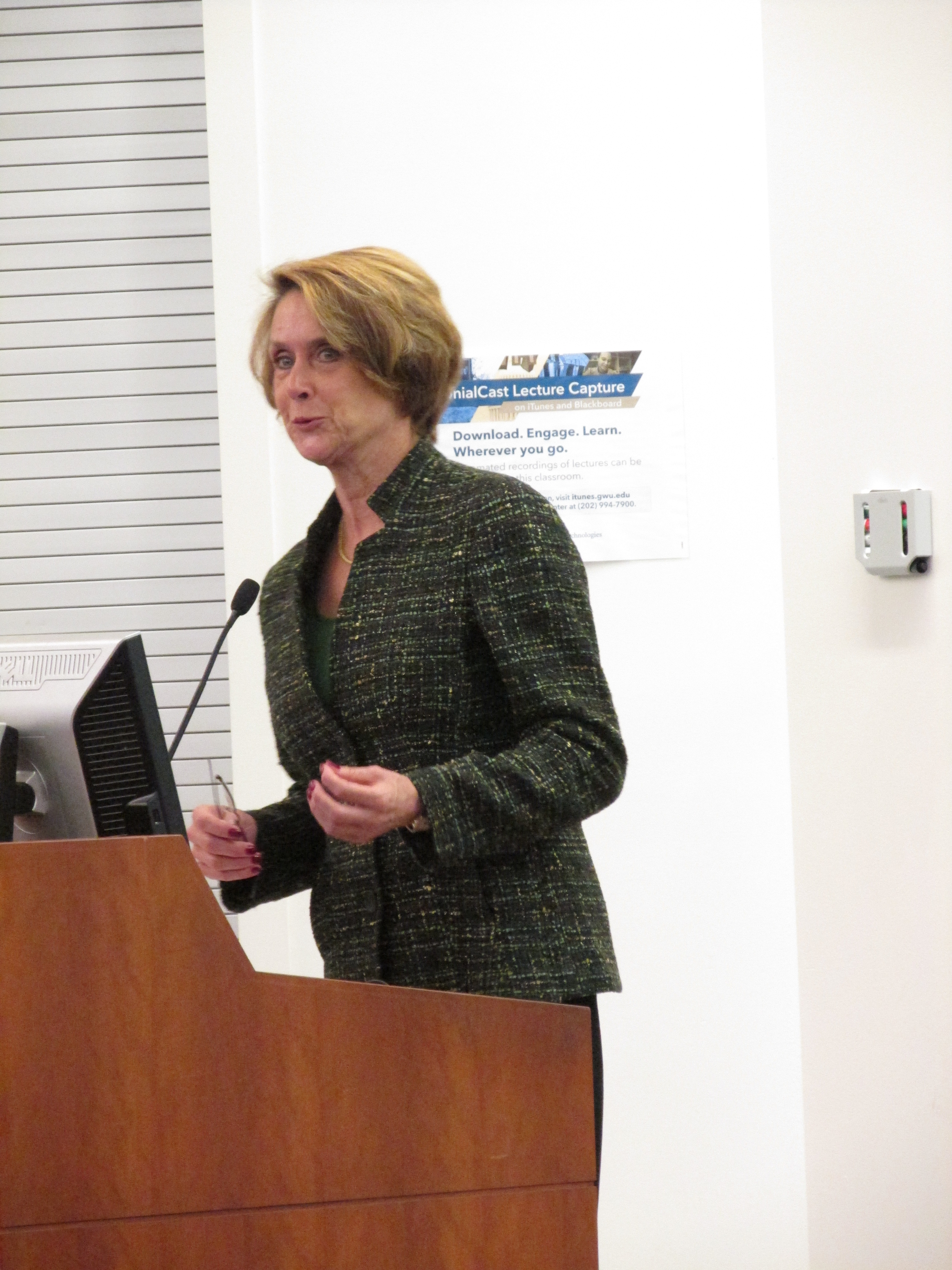

United States Ambassador to Yemen
- In office December 22, 1997 – August 30, 2001
- President: Bill Clinton; George W. Bush
- Preceded by: David George Newton
- Succeeded by: Edmund James Hull

Personal details
- Born: August 28, 1948 (age 77) St. Louis, Missouri, U.S.
- Education: University of California, Santa Barbara (BA); Tufts University (MA)

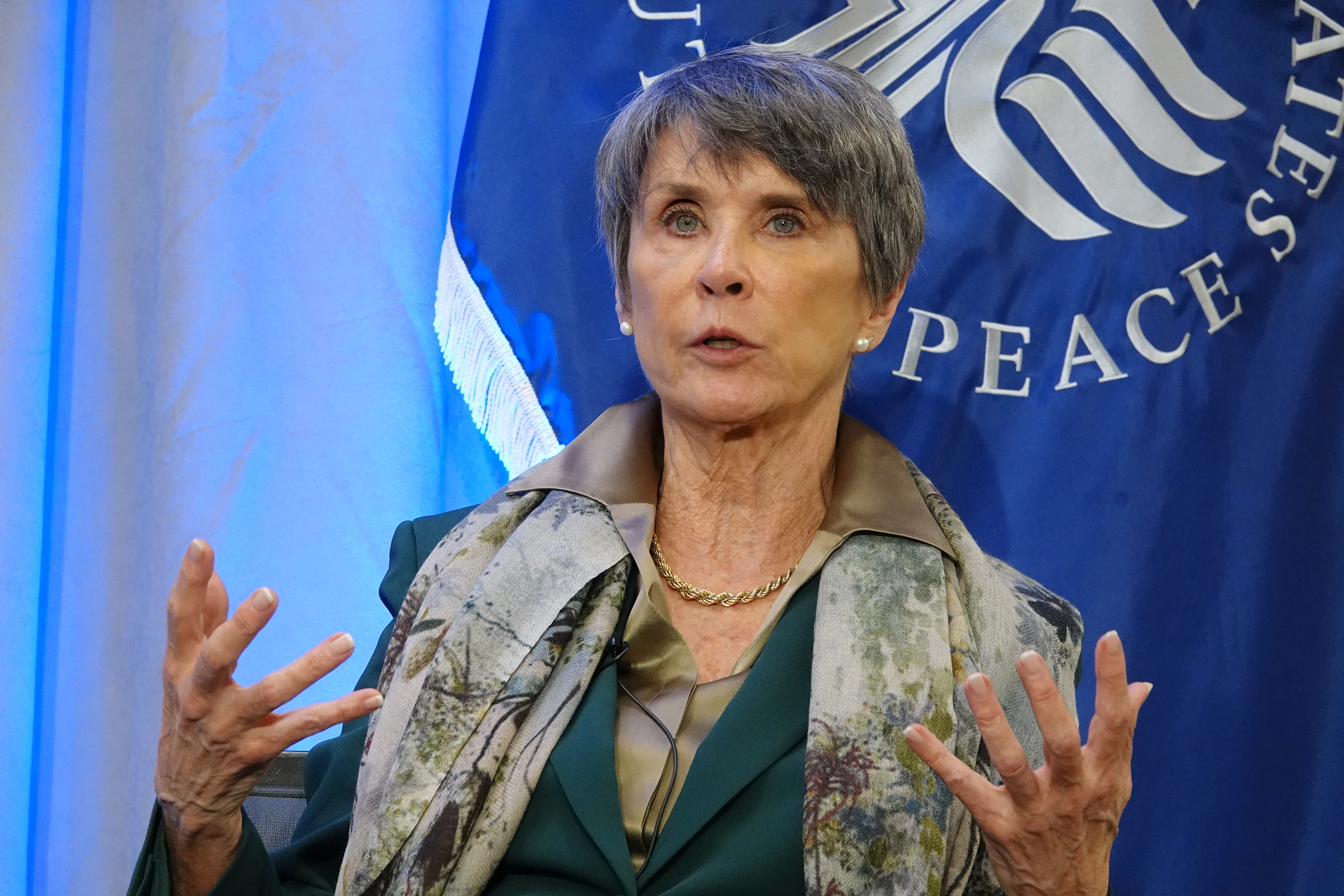
Bodine in 2023

Barbara K. Bodine (born August 28, 1948, in St. Louis, Missouri) is an American international relations scholar and former diplomat. She currently serves as the Distinguished Professor in the Practice of Diplomacy and Director of the Institute for the Study of Diplomacy at the School of Foreign Service of Georgetown University. Bodine previously directed the Scholars in the Nation's Service Initiative (SINSI) and lectured at Princeton's Woodrow Wilson School of Public and International Affairs.

== Education ==
Bodine earned her B.A. in political science and Asian studies magna cum laude from the University of California, Santa Barbara in 1970. She became a member of Kappa Alpha Theta, Gamma Rho chapter, fraternity for women. She received her master's degree from the Fletcher School of Law and Diplomacy at Tufts University. She also studied at the Chinese University of Hong Kong and the Department of State's Language Training Field Schools in Taiwan and Tunisia. She is a member of Phi Beta Kappa and serves on the board of directors of the UCSB Alumni Association and on the advisory council to the Program on Southwest Asian and Islamic Civilization Studies at the Fletcher School. She was the recipient of the UC Santa Barbara Distinguished Alumni Award in 1991.

== Diplomatic career ==
After initial tours in Hong Kong and Bangkok, Bodine spent her career working primarily on Southwest Asia and the Arabian Peninsula. She has twice served in the Bureau of Near East Affairs' Office of Arabian Peninsula Affairs, first as Country Officer for the Yemenis, then as Political-Military officer for the peninsula. She later served as Deputy Office Director. She had assignments as Deputy Principal Officer in Baghdad, and as Deputy Chief of Mission in Kuwait during the Iraqi invasion and occupation in 1990. She was awarded the Secretary of State's Award for Valor for her work in occupied Kuwait during the Gulf War.

Following Kuwait, Bodine was the Associate Coordinator for Operations and later served as the Acting Coordinator for Counterterrorism. She went on to serve as the Dean of Professional Studies at the Department's Foreign Service Institute. She has worked on the secretariat staff of Secretaries Kissinger and Vance, and as a Congressional Fellow in the office of former U.S. Senator Bob Dole. Most recently, Bodine spent a year as the Director of East African Affairs. Bodine is also an Advisory Board Member of Spirit of America, a 501(c)(3) organization that supports the safety and success of Americans serving abroad and the local people and partners they seek to help.

== Ambassador to Yemen and USS Cole bombing controversies ==
On November 7, 1997, Bodine was appointed to be Ambassador to the Republic of Yemen. Bodine's appointment in Sanaa coincided with events of major importance in Yemen: In 1999, Bodine negotiated the release of three Americans kidnapped in Yemen. On October 12, 2000, the US Navy destroyer USS Cole was bombed in a terrorist attack in the Gulf of Aden. In January 2001, en route to the Yemeni city of Taiz to meet with the country's president, a flight carrying Bodine and 90 other passengers from Yemen was hijacked by an Iraqi mid-flight. The plane was diverted to the small African nation of Djibouti, where it landed with the hijacker being overpowered by the crew. Bodine left Yemen as ambassador on August 30, 2001.

Bodine's career was marked by controversy surrounding her relationship with the FBI during its investigation of the USS Cole bombing: The PBS Frontline documentary "The Man Who Knew" included interviews with officials such as Richard A. Clarke (the Clinton administration's counterterrorism chief) and Barry Mawn (a former head of the New York FBI office) who stated that John P. O'Neill (an FBI agent and al-Qaeda expert) came into a personal conflict with Bodine over different perspectives on Yemen. When O'Neill briefly traveled back to New York for Thanksgiving, Bodine denied his re-entry visa, blocking O'Neill from returning to Yemen to continue the investigation on the USS Cole bombing. Frontline cited sources as saying that "O'Neill's removal from the scene in Yemen may have seriously limited the Cole investigation."

The chilly relationship between Bodine and O'Neill is detailed in Lawrence Wright's The Looming Tower. While O'Neill viewed Yemen as a serious threat, unstable from the First Yemeni Civil War, with a large number of weapons, large cells of Ayman al-Zawahiri's al-Jihad, and many Mujahideen veterans from the war in Afghanistan, Bodine, in contrast, viewed Yemen as an infant democracy, a "promising American ally in an unsettled but strategically important part of the world." O'Neill also took a hard line toward the Yemeni security forces and viewed his mission as a criminal investigation, while Bodine viewed O'Neill as reckless and harmful to diplomacy. Bodine was furious when O'Neill arrived with 150 investigators and other staff; she had thought she had an understanding with O'Neill that his staff would total no more than 50. Murray Weiss wrote in The Man Who Warned America, a biography of O'Neill, that Bodine "took an immediate and strong dislike to O'Neill, and seemingly worked to hamper some of his initiatives."

Bodine's failures and adversarial treatment toward American investigators were further detailed in The Black Banners by Ali Soufan, the lead investigator of the USS Cole bombing. Bodine also handled evidence directly from Yemeni officials, which was "contrary to protocol", as this made her part of the chain of custody and she "could be called as a witness in the trial and could be questioned about her handling of the evidence and whether she had tampered with it." Typically, "ambassadors would have said that the evidence should be given directly to the FBI or the regional security officer (RSO), the Department of State law enforcement officer of the embassy."

== Iraq ==
After serving in Yemen, Bodine became Diplomat in Residence at the University of California, Santa Barbara, until shortly before the 2003 invasion of Iraq. Bodine was appointed coordinator for central Iraq in charge of Baghdad by the Office of Reconstruction and Humanitarian Assistance (ORHA), which became the Coalition Provisional Authority (CPA) on April 21, 2003. She was removed from that position soon thereafter on May 11, 2003, when Paul Bremer was brought in to replace retired General Jay Garner as CPA Administrator.

== In the media ==
On September 8, 2006, Bodine complained in the Los Angeles Times about her portrayal in the controversial ABC docudrama The Path to 9/11. In an op-ed, Bodine wrote: "According to the mythmakers, a battle ensued between a cop obsessed with tracking down Osama bin Laden and a bureaucrat more concerned with the feelings of the host government than the fate of Americans and the realities of terrorism. I know this is false. I was there. I was the ambassador." The ABC miniseries compressed Bodine's role to a single extended scene suggesting she was dismissive, hostile, and vulgar toward John P. O'Neill from the moment of his arrival in Yemen. Broadcast worldwide on the fifth anniversary of 9/11 (9/10 and 9/11/2006), The Path to 9/11 was based on the official 9/11 Commission Report and other sources. ABC/Disney aired the film in the United States without commercial interruption, adding a disclaimer stating that it was "not a documentary", that various scenes were invented, and that narrative "time compression" was used. In the miniseries, Bodine was played by actress Patricia Heaton. O'Neill, portrayed by Harvey Keitel, could not provide a balancing response to Bodine's comments because he was killed in the September 11 attack on the World Trade Center.

More than nine years after the USS Cole bombing and following the apprehension of Nigerian Umar Farouk Abdul Mutallab, an alleged suicide bomber who is reported to have been trained and equipped in Yemen, Michelle Shephard, writing in the Toronto Star, published excerpts of an interview she conducted with Bodine. Bodine criticized the withdrawal of support the USA was providing to enhance the governance and infrastructure in Yemen, warning against US unilateral military intervention there:

If we go in and make this our war ... it is suddenly going to become a war against us and we will lose it.

Bodine was interviewed in Charles H. Ferguson's 2007 documentary No End in Sight, and, as a guest on Real Time with Bill Maher, on September 3, 2007.

Bodine was portrayed by Jennifer Ehle in the Hulu miniseries adaptation of The Looming Tower.

== General and cited references ==
- Barbara Bodine, Ambassador to Republic of Yemen
- "Barbara Bodine, Ambassador to Republic of Yemen". United States Department of State. 2001. "The President announced on September 2, 1997 his intention to nominate Barbara K. Bodine, a career member of the Senior Foreign Service, to be Ambassador to the Republic of Yemen. She was confirmed on November 5, 1997."

Diplomatic posts
Preceded by David George Newton	United States Ambassador to Yemen; 1997–2001	Succeeded by Edmund James Hull
