= No End in Sight =

2007 documentary film by Charles Ferguson

No End In Sight
- Theatrical release poster
- Directed by: Charles Ferguson
- Produced by: Charles Ferguson; Jennie Amias; Audrey Marrs; Jessie Vogelson
- Narrated by: Campbell Scott
- Edited by: Chad Beck; Cindy Lee
- Music by: Peter Nashel
- Distributed by: Magnolia Pictures
- Release date: July 27, 2007
- Running time: 102 minutes
- Country: United States
- Language: English

No End in Sight is a 2007 American documentary film about the American occupation of Iraq. The directorial debut of Academy Award-winning documentary filmmaker Charles Ferguson, it premiered on January 22, 2007, at the Sundance Film Festival and opened in its first two theaters in the United States on July 27, 2007. By December of that year, it had a theatrical gross of $1.4 million. The film was nominated for Best Documentary Feature at the 80th Academy Awards.

== Interviews ==
To a large extent, the film consists of interviews with people who were involved in the initial Iraqi occupation authority and the Office for Reconstruction and Humanitarian Assistance (ORHA), which was later replaced by the Coalition Provisional Authority (CPA). Thirty-five people who had become disillusioned by what they experienced at the time are interviewed. In particular, many of those interviewed claim that the inexperience of the core members of the Bush administration—and their refusal to seek, acknowledge or accept input from more experienced outsiders—was at the root of the disastrous occupation effort. Other interviewees include former soldiers who had been stationed in Iraq and authors and journalists who were critical of the war planning.

Those interviewed are:

- Lieutenant General Jay Garner, who briefly ran the reconstruction of Iraq before being replaced by L. Paul Bremer
- Ambassador Barbara Bodine, who was briefly in charge of the Baghdad embassy in spring 2003
- Richard Armitage, United States Deputy Secretary of State from 2001 to 2005
- Robert Hutchings, former chairman of the National Intelligence Council
- Colonel Lawrence Wilkerson, Colin Powell's former chief of staff
- Colonel Paul Hughes, who worked in the ORHA and then the CPA and currently serves as a senior advisor to the U.S. Institute of Peace
- George Packer, author of The Assassins' Gate
- Chris Allbritton, journalist and blogger for Time magazine
- Marc Garlasco, senior Iraq analyst at the Defense Intelligence Agency from 1997 to 2003
- Joost Hiltermann, Mideast director at the International Crisis Group
- Samantha Power, author of A Problem From Hell, professor at Harvard Kennedy School at Harvard University, and U.S. Ambassador to the United Nations from 2013 to 2017
- James Fallows, author of Blind into Baghdad, national editor at The Atlantic
- Paul Pillar, National Intelligence Officer for the Mideast on the National Intelligence Council from 2000 to 2005
- Ali Fadhil, an Iraqi journalist
- 1st Lieutenant Seth Moulton, U.S. Marines, elected the U.S. representative for Massachusetts's 6th congressional district in 2014
- Linda Bilmes, former Assistant Secretary of the U.S. Department of Commerce, professor at Harvard Kennedy School at Harvard University and co-author of The Three Trillion Dollar War
- David Yancey, specialist, Military Police, U.S. Army
- Hugo Gonzales, field artillery gunner, U.S. Army
- Omar Fekeiki, office manager of the Baghdad bureau of The Washington Post
- Nir Rosen, a journalist
- Walter B. Slocombe, Senior Advisor for Security and Defense to the CPA
- Amatzia Baram (as Amazia Baram), professor of Middle East history, former advisor to the Bush administration
- Aida Ussayran, former Deputy Minister for Human Rights in Iraq

The three Iraq veterans—Moulton, Yancey, and Gonzales—were selected for inclusion from a larger group of Iraq veterans who were considered. Ferguson chose to include those three in the film because they provided "the most interesting, the most representative, and the most poignant" interviews.

=== Archival footage ===
- Donald Rumsfeld, United States Secretary of Defense
- Condoleezza Rice, United States Secretary of State
- Sérgio Vieira de Mello, Brazilian United Nations High Commissioner for Human Rights, who perished in the August 19, 2003 Canal Hotel bombing in Baghdad.

== Content ==
No End in Sight focuses primarily on period immediately following the American invasion of Iraq in March 2003. It asserts that serious mistakes made by the administration of President George W. Bush during that time were the cause of subsequent problems in Iraq, such as the rise of the insurgency, a lack of security and basic services for many Iraqis, sectarian violence, and, at one point, the risk of complete civil war.

The film notes the lack of advance planning for the post invasion governance of Iraq. It criticizes Secretary of Defense Donald Rumsfeld for not providing enough troops to maintain order or declaring martial law after the country was conquered. The ORHA had identified at least twenty crucial government buildings and cultural sites in Baghdad, but none of the locations were protected during the invasion; only the oil ministry was guarded. With no police force or national army to maintain order, ministries and buildings were looted for their desks, tables, chairs, phones, computers, and even large machinery and rebar, though Rumsfeld initially dismissed the widespread looting as no worse than that which takes place during riots in American cities. Among the pillaged sites were Iraqi museums containing priceless artifacts from some of the earliest human civilizations, which, it is suggested, sent chilling signals to the average Iraqi that the American forces did not intend to maintain law and order. Eventually, the looting turned into an organized destruction of Baghdad. The destruction of libraries and records, in combination with "de-Ba'athification", ruined the bureaucracy that existed prior to the U.S. invasion, and ORHA staff reported that they had to start from scratch to rebuild the government infrastructure.

According to the film, there were three especially grave early mistakes made by L. Paul Bremer, the head of the CPA:

- His stopping of preparations for the formation of an interim Iraqi government.
- His first official executive order, which implemented "de-Ba'athification". Saddam Hussein's ruling Ba'ath Party counted as its members a huge majority of Iraq's governmental employees, including educational officials and some teachers, as it was not possible to attain such positions unless one was a member. By order of the CPA, these skilled, and often apolitical, individuals were fired and banned from holding any positions in Iraq's new government.
- His second official executive order, which, against the advice of the U.S. military, disbanded all of Iraq's military entities. The U.S. military had wanted the Iraqi troops retained to help maintain order, but Bremer decided to build a new Iraqi military force instead. This order caused 500,000 young Iraqi men to become unemployed, many of whom had extended families to support, and many of whom then joined a militia force. In the chaos after the invasion, Iraq's huge arms depots were available for pillaging by anyone who wanted weapons and explosives, and the former soldiers converged on the stockpiles. The U.S. forces knew the locations of the weapon caches, but said they lacked the troops to secure them, and these arms would later be used against the Americans and new Iraqi government forces.

These three mistakes are cited as the primary causes of the rapid deterioration of occupied Iraq into chaos, as the collapse of the government bureaucracy and military resulted in a lack of authority and order. When Islamic fundamentalist groups moved to fill this void, their ranks swelled with disillusioned Iraqis.

== Reception ==
On review aggregator website Rotten Tomatoes, the film has an approval rating of 92%, based on 98 reviews, with an average rating of 8.15/10; the website's critical consensus states: "Charles Ferguson's documentary provides a good summary of the decisions that led to the mess in post-war Iraq, and offers politically interested audiences something they'd been looking for: a lowdown on the decision making". On Metacritic, it has a score of 88 out of 100, based on 28 reviews, indicating "universal acclaim".

Roger Ebert of the Chicago Sun-Times gave the film 4 stars out of 4 and said: "This is not a documentary filled with anti-war activists or sitting ducks for Michael Moore. Most of the people in the film were important to the Bush administration." Ebert concluded by stating that "I am distinctly not comparing anyone to Hitler, but I cannot help being reminded of the stories of him in his Berlin bunker, moving nonexistent troops on a map, and issuing orders to dead generals."

Richard Corliss of Time praised the film, saying it "stands out for its comprehensive take on how we got there, why we can't get out", and opined that everyone should see it, calling it "the perfect stocking-stuffer for holiday enlightenment."

A. O. Scott of The New York Times called the film "exacting, enraging" and said that "[Charles Ferguson] presents familiar material with impressive concision and impact, offering a clear, temperate and devastating account of high-level arrogance and incompetence." Scott explained that "most of the movie deals with a period of a few months in the spring and summer of 2003, when a series of decisions were made that did much to determine the terrible course of subsequent events" and "the knowledge and expertise of military, diplomatic and technical professionals was overridden by the ideological certainty of political loyalists." He remarked: "It might be argued that since Mr. Bremer, Mr. Rumsfeld and Mr. Wolfowitz declined to appear in the film, Mr. Ferguson was able to present only one side of the story. But the accumulated professional standing of the people he did interview, and their calm, detailed insistence on the facts, makes such an objection implausible." In conclusion, Scott called the film "sober, revelatory and absolutely vital".

Rob Nelson of the Village Voice said: "Masterfully edited and cumulatively walloping, Charles Ferguson's No End in Sight turns the well-known details of our monstrously bungled Iraq war into an enraging, apocalyptic litany of fuck-ups." Nelson said the film "is certainly a film about failure, perhaps the ultimate film about failure. Or maybe a film about the ultimate failure?", and "is less a work of investigation (or activism) than history." In his view, "Focusing on the war itself, Ferguson is chiefly interested in compiling a filmed dossier of incompetence—not so much to argue that the war could have been won and won early, but to suggest that the magnitude of arrogant irresponsibility will carry aftershocks as far into the future as the mind can imagine", and "Ferguson's approach is at once relentless and, with the help of Campbell Scott's flat narration, chillingly calm and composed". He remarked that "The evidence speaks for itself, and No End in Sight—addressed to those who'll be swayed against the war by ineptitude more than immorality—is the rare American documentary that doesn't appear to preach to the converted, or at least not only to the converted", and "For those of us who've opposed the war for years, the movie is at once intensely frightening and, it must be admitted, disturbingly reassuring."

=== Top ten lists ===
No End in Sight appeared on many critics' top ten lists of the best films of 2007:

- 1st - Stephen Hunter, The Washington Post
- 3rd - Ty Burr, The Boston Globe
- 5th - A. O. Scott, The New York Times
- 5th - Lisa Schwarzbaum, Entertainment Weekly
- 6th - Dana Stevens, Slate
- 6th - Marc Mohan, The Oregonian
- 6th - Michael Sragow, The Baltimore Sun
- 6th - Rene Rodriguez, The Miami Herald
- 7th - Marc Savlov, The Austin Chronicle
- 7th - Richard Corliss, TIME
- 8th - Ann Hornaday, The Washington Post
- 8th - Peter Rainer, The Christian Science Monitor
- 9th - Carrie Rickey, The Philadelphia Inquirer
- 9th - Owen Gleiberman, Entertainment Weekly
- 10th - Scott Foundas, LA Weekly (tied with Redacted and The Wind That Shakes the Barley)
- 10th - Stephanie Zacharek, Salon (tied with Redacted)

=== Awards and nominations ===
At the 2007 Sundance Film Festival, No End in Sight won the Special Jury Prize: Documentary.

The film received the following awards in the 2007 film season:

- National Society of Film Critics Award for Best Non-Fiction Film
- New York Film Critics Circle Award for Best Non-Fiction Film
- Los Angeles Film Critics Association Award for Best Documentary/Non-Fiction Film
- San Francisco Film Critics Circle Award for Best Documentary
- Florida Film Critics Circle Award for Best Documentary
- Southeastern Film Critics Association Award for Best Documentary
- Toronto Film Critics Association Award for Best Documentary

On January 22, 2008, the film was nominated for the Academy Award for Best Documentary Feature, though it lost to Taxi to the Dark Side, which was made by Alex Gibney, the executive producer of No End in Sight. Additionally, Charles Ferguson received a nomination for the Writers Guild of America Award for Best Documentary Screenplay.

== Book version ==
A 2008 book version of No End in Sight authored by Ferguson entitled No End in Sight: Iraq's Descent into Chaos, is available from the publisher PublicAffairs. It includes interviews with principals in the film as well as numerous other senior military officers and key civilians who were involved in the run up to, execution of, and occupation phases of Operation Iraqi Freedom, to include those assigned to CENTCOM and ORHA.

== See also ==
- Frontline – a scene from the program "The Lost Year in Iraq" is shown in No End in Sight
- Inside Job – Ferguson's Academy Award-winning second documentary, about the 2008 financial crisis
