= Yemenia Flight 448 =

January 2001 aircraft hijacking

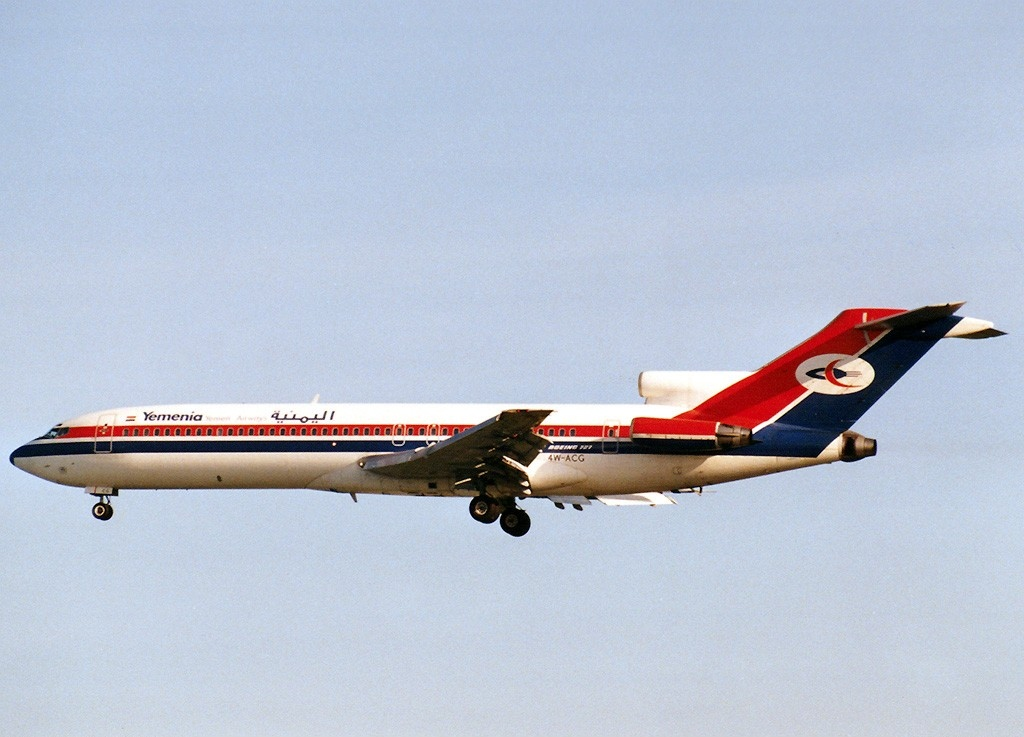
- A Yemenia Boeing 727-2N8 similar to the aircraft involved in the incident.

Hijacking
- Date: 23 January 2001
- Summary: Hijacking
- Site: Djibouti–Ambouli International Airport, Djibouti, Djibouti; 11°32′50.39″N 43°09′34.13″E

Aircraft
- Aircraft type: Boeing 727-2N8
- Operator: Yemenia
- IATA flight No.: IY448
- ICAO flight No.: IYE448
- Call sign: YEMENIA 448
- Flight origin: Sanaa International Airport, Yemen
- Stopover: Taiz International Airport, Yemen
- Destination: Hodeidah International Airport, Yemen
- Passengers: 91
- Crew: 10
- Fatalities: 0
- Injuries: 1
- Survivors: 101

Yemenia Flight 448 was a domestic scheduled passenger flight piloted by Captain Amer Anis from Sanaa to Hodeidah, Yemen, that was hijacked on 23 January 2001. The Yemenia Boeing 727-2N8 departed Sanaa International Airport bound for a stopover at Taiz-Al Janad Airport, Ta'izz. The passengers included the United States Ambassador to Yemen Barbara Bodine, US Deputy Chief of Mission to Yemen, and the Yemeni Ambassador to the US.

== Sequence of events ==
Fifteen minutes after takeoff, a man armed with a pen gun hijacked the aircraft and demanded to be taken to Baghdad, Iraq. In addition to his gun, he claimed to have explosives hidden in his suitcase. The flight crew convinced the hijacker to first divert to Djibouti to refuel. The aircraft made an emergency landing at Djibouti–Ambouli International Airport, where the flight crew, led by flight captain Amer Anis, overpowered the hijacker in what US State Department Richard Boucher described as "really terrific action". The only injury was to the flight engineer, who was grazed by a bullet during the fight.

== Hijacker ==
The hijacker was an unemployed Iraqi who wanted to look elsewhere for employment opportunities. He was extradited to Yemen, and sentenced to 15 years in prison in March 2001.
