= Thomas C. Krajeski =

American diplomat

Thomas Krajeski
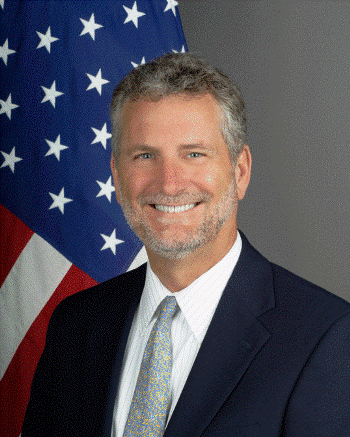

Senior Advisor for Partner Engagement on Syria Foreign Fighters
- Incumbent
- Assumed office January 2015
- President: Barack Obama; Donald Trump
- Preceded by: Robert Bradtke

United States Ambassador to Bahrain
- In office November 22, 2011 – December 20, 2014
- President: Barack Obama
- Preceded by: Adam Ereli
- Succeeded by: William Roebuck

United States Ambassador to Yemen
- In office August 16, 2004 – April 18, 2007
- President: George W. Bush
- Preceded by: Edmund Hull
- Succeeded by: Stephen Seche

Personal details
- Born: 1950 (age 75–76) Groveland, Massachusetts, U.S.
- Education: University of Massachusetts, Amherst; University of North Carolina, Chapel Hill
- Awards: President's Award for Distinguished Federal Civilian Service (2007)

Thomas Charles Krajeski (born 1950) is an American diplomat. He was the United States Ambassador to Yemen from 2004 to 2007 and the United States Ambassador to Bahrain from 2011 to 2014.

== Biography ==
Thomas Krajeski was born in Groveland, Massachusetts. He is a graduate of the University of Massachusetts Amherst and the University of North Carolina at Chapel Hill, having studied the Russian language and literature.

An American diplomat, he has served in U.S. embassies in Kathmandu, Nepal from 1980 to 1982, in Madras, India from 1982 to 1984, in the State Department Press Office in 1985, and in Warsaw, Poland from 1985 to 1988. From 1990 to 1992, he learned Arabic at the Foreign Service Institute, and served in Cairo, Egypt until 1997. From 1997 to 2001, he served as Consul General in Dubai, UAE. From 2001 to 2004, he worked in the Bureau of Near Eastern Affairs in the Department of State. From July to October 2003, he served as political advisor to L. Paul Bremer with the Coalition Provisional Authority in Baghdad, Iraq. From 2004 to 2007, he served as the United States Ambassador to Yemen in Sana'a. From 2008 to 2009, he served again in Baghdad.

In 2007, he received the President's Award for Distinguished Federal Civilian Service. He has also received five Superior Honor Awards.

Since August 2009, he has served as Senior Vice President of the National Defense University, where he also teaches foreign policy.

On June 30, 2011, Ambassador Krajeski was nominated by President Obama to be the next United States' Ambassador to Bahrain.

Diplomatic posts
Preceded by Edmund Hull	United States Ambassador to Yemen; 2004–2007	Succeeded by Stephen Seche
Preceded by Adam Ereli	United States Ambassador to Bahrain; 2011–2014	Succeeded by William Roebuck
Preceded by Robert Bradtke	Senior Advisor for Partner Engagement on Syria Foreign Fighters; 2015–present	Incumbent
