= Coalition Provisional Authority Order 2 =

Order made by the Coalition Provisional Authority in Iraq

Coalition Provisional Authority Order Number 2: Dissolution of Entities signed by Paul Bremer on behalf of the Coalition Provisional Authority on 23 May 2003, disbanded the Iraqi military, security, and intelligence infrastructure of President Saddam Hussein. Approximately 400,000 Iraqi military personnel were made unemployed by the order.

It has since become an object of controversy, cited by some critics as the biggest American mistake made in the immediate aftermath of the fall of Saddam Hussein and as one of the main causes of the Iraqi insurgency and the rise of the Islamic State of Iraq and the Levant (ISIL/ISIS).

== Background ==
Before the United States and coalition partners launched the invasion of Iraq on 20 March 2003, former US Army Lieutenant General Jay Garner and the US military had already laid out several plans for what to do with Iraqi security forces once they were defeated. Recognizing the danger posed by complete demobilization in an environment of high unemployment, poor security, and social unrest, the plan called for the dissolution of the Iraqi Republican Guard, the engagement of soldiers in the Iraqi Army in reconstruction efforts, and the foundation of a new army from three to five existing Iraqi divisions; this plan was presented to President George W. Bush by Under Secretary of Defense for Policy Douglas Feith during a National Security Council (NSC) meeting on 12 May 2003. The NSC unanimously favored keeping and utilizing the Iraqi army.

On 11 May 2003, General Garner was replaced as head of the Coalition Provisional Authority (CPA) by Ambassador Paul Bremer. Bremer's first order as CPA administrator, issued 16 May, disestablished the Iraqi Baath Party and began a process of "de-Ba'athification."

== Formulation of the second order ==
Upon arrival in Baghdad, Bremer and his senior advisor, Walter B. Slocombe, came to favor the dissolution of the Iraqi Army. This view was based on the belief that the Iraqi Army had already demobilized itself and could not be practically reconstituted, e.g., the Iraqi conscripts would not return, and in any case Iraqi military facilities had been destroyed. In the words of Slocombe, "There was no intact Iraqi force to 'disband.'" As to who originally proposed the idea, it has been sometimes attributed to Slocombe; Feith stated that it was Bremer's idea, but Bremer has denied that and said he could not remember who had initially come up with the idea.

According to Bremer in his book My Year in Iraq, the CPA and the Pentagon jointly coordinated the drafting of the order to disband the Iraqi defense and security services. Bremer, highlighting that such an order would be critical in eliminating the foundations of the previous Iraqi regime and demonstrating "to the Iraqi people that...neither Saddam nor his gang is coming back," sent a proposal for the disbandment to then Secretary of Defense Donald Rumsfeld on 19 May, along with a recommendation that all former troops except some top intelligence, security, and Baathist leaders be given severance payments. Under Secretary of Defense Feith requested some editing of the text on 22 May, and that night Rumsfeld's chief of staff Lawrence Di Rita and CPA spokesperson Dan Senor coordinated plans for the actual announcement. After receiving permission from Secretary Rumsfeld, Bremer briefed President Bush by video conference and subsequently signed the order on 23 May.

However, Bush said in a later interview that the initial plan was to maintain the Iraqi Army, and he was not sure why that did not occur. In response to this report, Bremer provided The New York Times with a letter sent by him on 22 May through the Secretary of Defense to the President that described the measure, to which the President sent a thank you letter. Furthermore, Bremer stated that even before he arrived in Iraq, he sent a draft of the order on 9 May to Rumsfeld, Wolfowitz, Feith, the Joint Chiefs of Staff, and then CFLCC Commander, Lieutenant General David McKiernan. The Times quoted an anonymous White House official that the original plan to maintain the army could not be carried out and that Bush understood that.

General Peter Pace later stated that the Joint Chiefs of Staff were not consulted for advice or a recommendation with regard to the order. Secretary of State Colin Powell has also said he was never consulted on the matter, which he believed was a major mistake, and then National Security Advisor Condoleezza Rice was said to have been surprised by the decision. According to Franklin Miller, who helped formulate post-war plans of the National Security Council for Iraq:

The most portentous decision of the occupation, disbanding the Iraqi army, was carried out stealthily and without giving the president’s principal advisors an opportunity to consider it and give the president their views.”

Paul Bremer has said that instructions to disband the Iraqi army were given to him by Undersecretary of Defense Feith who told Bremer, “We’ve got to show all the Iraqis that we’re serious about building a new Iraq….And that means that Saddam’s instruments of repression have no role in that new nation.” Feith’s boss, Secretary of Defense Donald Rumsfeld, has said that the order to disband the Iraqi army was not formulated in the Pentagon, but rather came from “elsewhere”. The CIA Director at that time, George Tenet, has said the decision was made “above Rumsfeld’s pay grade”.

A different set of events was portrayed by Bob Woodward in his book State of Denial. According to him, the decision never came back to Washington for input except for a lawyer from the National Security Council, who gave legal opinions on the first two CPA orders. Rumsfeld said he spoke only rarely with Bremer, no NSC meeting had been convened on the matter, and that he "would be surprised" if either Deputy Secretary of Defense Paul Wolfowitz or Under Secretary Feith had told Bremer to carry out the two CPA orders.

A 2023 article in the journal Foreign Affairs declared that, “a more complete origin story is finally available”, regarding the order that disbanded the Iraqi army. The initial draft apparently originated in the Pentagon’s Office of Special Plans led by Abram Shulsky, who recounted that, “There was not a real interagency process….It would have been informal at that point”. When Bremer presented it during a video conference with the president and NSC on May 22, 2003, no NSC members spoke up, and after a long period of silence Bush said to Bremer, “you’re the guy on the ground”. Bush thus deferred to Bremer, and Bremer issued the order the next day.

=== UK input ===
Several British generals later said that they raised concern about the disbandment and were personally against it, though Bremer responded that no UK officials voiced concerns in their meetings and that they regarded the effective demobilization of the Iraqi military as a "fait accompli". These claims were disputed by senior British officers. A 2004 report in The Guardian cited senior UK military and intelligence sources saying that British Admiral Michael Boyce told his commanders to negotiate with senior Iraqi Army and Republican Guard officers to switch sides and operate under UK guidance to uphold law and order, but that CPA orders 1 and 2 effectively destroyed any chance to regroup the Iraqi forces for such a plan.

== Aftermath ==
CPA Order 2 led to protests and rioting from former Iraqi soldiers with some threatening attacks on coalition forces if their demands were not met. At a protest in Baghdad on June 18th, 2003, two former Iraqi soldiers were shot dead by US soldiers as they were allegedly throwing rocks. In response to the protests Bremer disparaged the demands of the former Iraqi soldiers saying "they were thrown out of work by something called the freedom of Iraq".

On June 15th, 2003, Bremer sent Donald Rumsfeld a memo with the title "should we pay the ex-military?". It stated "we have been studying the problems the disbanded Iraqi armed forces pose to force protection, general security, and law and order. When we dissolved the MOD and the old armed forces, we dismissed their employees. That has left some 230,000 officers and NCO's unemployed, some of whom have been protesting their not having been paid. This discontent among a respected group with training in weapons and with networks of contacts and loyalties presents a significant security threat".

On 13 September Bremer amended the order through CPA order number 34, which stated that the Board of Supreme Audit was no longer to be considered a dissolved entity and should continue operations.

In 2004, Iraq's interim president Ghazi Al Yawer blamed the deteriorating security situation in the country on the disbanding of the Iraqi military, saying that "We blame the United States 100 percent for the security in Iraq, they occupied the country, disbanded the security agencies and for 10 months left Iraq's borders open for anyone to come in without a visa or even a passport."

lIn an interview with PBS's Frontline, Bremer went on record saying, "I think the decision not to recall Saddam's army, from a political point of view, is the single most important correct decision that we made in the 14 months we were there." President Bush however took a different view, writing in his memoir "Decision points" that "Thousands of armed men had just been told they were not wanted. Instead of signing up for the new military, many joined the insurgency".

In 2009, Iraqi president Jalal Talabani and president of the Kurdistan region Masoud Barzani denied statements made by Bremer that the Kurds were partly behind the decision to disband the Iraqi military as they threatened to secede from Iraq if the military was not disbanded. Talabani said in a statement that "First of all, we had no knowledge of the disbanding of the army. We did not approve this step but our view was that thousands of nationalist Iraqi soldiers and officers should be kept in the modern armed forces while Paul Bremer acted with the mentality of the loser and took this step which caused chaos and instability.” Also Barzani's press Secretary Faisal al-Sabbagh stated that "We would like to make it clear that Paul Bremer was not faithful to the truth in his statement. The Kurds view at the time was to rebuild the army, not disband it."

In his book "it worked for me: in life and leadership", Colin Powell who was United States secretary of state at the time wrote that CPA Order 2 "left thousands of the most highly skilled people in the country jobless and angry—prime recruits for insurgency."

== Dissolved entities ==
=== Institutions ===
- Ministry of Defense
- Ministry of Information
- Ministry of State for Military Affairs
- Iraqi Intelligence Service
- National Security Bureau
- Directorate of General Security
- Special Security Organization

Entities affiliated with Hussein bodyguards:

- Murafaqin (Companions)
- Himaya al Khasa (Special Guard)

=== Military organizations ===
- Iraqi Army, Air Force, Navy, the Air Defense Force, and other regular military services
- Republican Guard
- Special Republican Guard
- Directorate of General Military Intelligence
- Jerusalem Army
- Emergency Forces

=== Paramilitaries ===
- Fedayeen Saddam
- Ba'ath Party Militia
- Friends of Saddam
- Saddam's Lion Cubs (Ashbal Saddam)

=== Other ===
- Presidential Diwan
- Presidential Secretariat
- Revolutionary Command Council
- The National Assembly
- The Youth Organization (al-Futuwah)
- National Olympic Committee
- Revolutionary, Special and National Security Courts
