= Nancy Okail =

Egyptian activist and scholar

- Born: 1976 or 1977 (age 49–50); Egypt
- Education: American University in Cairo (BA. 2000, MA. 2003); University of Sussex (PhD. 2009)
- Website: Official website

Nancy Okail (born 1976/1977) is an Egyptian activist and a scholar with a focus on security, human rights, democracy and power relations of foreign aid. In 2013, Okail was sentenced in absentia to five years in prison in the controversial Egyptian court case against local and foreign non-governmental organization (NGOs).

She speaks publicly about Middle East politics and civil society and has spoken at Princeton University, Stanford University, Johns Hopkins University, Tufts University, and Georgetown University. Her interviews and articles were featured in international journals and media outlets such as CNN, the Atlantic, Huffington Post, Al monitor, NPR, Cairo Review and the Washington Post.

== Overview ==
Okail’s story, as Defendant No. 34 in the controversial Egyptian court case against Local and Foreigner NGOs, was featured in several international media outlets (the New York Times, the Washington Post, and the Global Post). Okail is particularly well known for her act of resistance against the Egyptian government: reading George Orwell whilst awaiting trial in a cage in an Egyptian courtroom. After awaiting and standing trial in this court cage for six months, she was finally sentenced to five years in prison on June 4, 2013, in absentia while she was in the US. She is currently unable to return to Egypt where her family, including her four-year-old twin son and daughter, live.

Okail is the former Executive Director of the Tahrir Institute for Middle East Policy (TIMEP) in Washington DC. Prior to heading TIMEP, she was director of Freedom House's Egypt program. She has more than 13 years’ experience in promoting democracy and development in the Middle East/North Africa region and is a visiting scholar at the School of Advanced International Studies at Johns Hopkins University.

Previously, Okail worked with the Egyptian government as a senior evaluation officer of foreign aid and has managed programs for Egyptian pro-democracy organizations that challenged the Mubarak regime. In the summer of 2005 she came to the US to complete a fellowship at Stanford University's Center for Developing Democracy and Rule of Law. She later moved to the UK for her doctoral studies at the Institute of Development Studies at the University of Sussex when she was awarded the British Chevening scholarship.

In 2011, Okail returned to Egypt to participate in the struggle for democratic transition after the January 25th Revolution. Shortly after her arrival she was subject to harassment by state security until she was prosecuted in the NGO trial. Her professors and colleagues at Stanford University and University of Sussex strongly supported Okail's innocence and were against the injustice of the Egyptian government. They showed their support by writing extensively to advocate for her from abroad. Her supporters included Stanford University, Lawrence Haddad, and Naysan Adlparvar of the Institute of Development Studies.

== NGO Trial ==
US-Egyptian relations, though historically friendly, became strained during the 2011 Egyptian Revolution. At that time US government officials tried to encourage then-president Hosni Mubarak to enact government reforms, allow peaceful protests and refrain from using violence against protesters. Relations between the two countries hit a low point when Egyptian authorities raided the offices of 17 local and foreign NGOs—amongst them were the International Republican Institute, Freedom House, the National Democratic Institute, and the German Konrad-Adenauer Foundation. The NGO workers, whose offices were raided on December 29, 2011, were arrested on allegations of illegal funding from foreign donors, working without legal permits, and fomenting unrest in Egypt. The US retaliated by threatening to halt a $1.3billion military aid package to Egypt, calling the raids an attack on democratic values.

As several American NGO workers were implicated, the United States reacted quickly to ensure the timely release of the prisoners. However, Egyptian government officials refused to allow the accused to leave the country and moved forward with the prosecution. Seven of the Americans implicated were placed on a no-fly list, and Egyptian media depicted the case "as a battle for national sovereignty against Western bullies."

However, for Okail, the trial was an opportunity to voice concerns about human rights and freedoms in Egypt and the precarious and capricious relationship between Egypt and the US. "When the U.S. decides to just give away the military aid to Egypt without considering the consequences on us," Okail expressed to the New York Times, "it sends a message that the West and the U.S. don’t care about democracy and human rights. They just care about strategic stability. We, the defendants, felt betrayed. The battle we fight standing in that cage, hearing calls for our execution, is not a battle for our freedom but a battle for liberating Egyptian civil society."

Okail gained international media attention for a display of resistance while on trial: seated in the defendants’ cage in the courtroom, Okail read a copy of George Orwell’s Homage to Catalonia - an action that political analyst Thomas Friedman called, "[a] gesture of resistance to the Egyptian military regime that had put on trial democracy advocates who dared to partner with Egyptians in promoting democracy in a country that supposedly just had a democratic revolution."

The Americans on trial were able to leave the country after posting bail, and Okail and her fellow Egyptian defendants originally remained in Egypt. Okail left the country six months before the trial and the other Egyptians on trial left shortly before the verdict due to the worsening political situation in Egypt. Okail was later tried in absentia and sentenced to five years in prison. Following her sentencing, she said, "when the revolution happened, I went back to Egypt to work in human rights and democracy, and I was found guilty and sentenced to five years in prison while the police officers accused of killing the protesters all got acquitted. I can't say anything more than that."

== Tahrir Institute for Middle East Policy ==
In October 2013, Okail joined the research institution the Tahrir Institute for Middle East Policy (TIMEP) as the Executive Director. Based in Washington DC, TIMEP is a newly established, nonpartisan, and nonprofit organization dedicated to understanding and supporting Middle Eastern countries undergoing democratic transitions. This organization is committed to informing U.S. policymakers and the public of developments in these countries.

The Tahrir Institute for Middle East Policy (TIMEP) is a policy research organization focused on emerging democracies and conflict-affected areas in the Middle East and North Africa. Its work examines social, political, and economic developments in the region through research and analysis. TIMEP aims to connect international audiences with local perspectives and knowledge from the region, and to contribute to public and policy discussions concerning the Middle East and North Africa.

On October 7, 2019 Okail stepped down from her role as TIMEP’s Executive Director.

== Education ==
Okail holds a Doctorate of Philosophy (DPhil) in International Development from the Institute of Development Studies (IDS), University of Sussex (2005–2009). She also previously earned a Master of Arts (MA) in Political Science, with an "International Development Specialization" from The American University in Cairo (2003) and a Bachelor of Arts (BA) in Economics (Honours) from The American University in Cairo, Egypt (2000).
