= Stephen Seche =

American diplomat (born 1948)

Stephen A. Seche
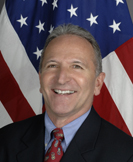
- Stephen A. Seche

United States Ambassador to Yemen
- In office September 5, 2007 – May 17, 2010
- President: George W. Bush; Barack Obama
- Preceded by: Thomas C. Krajeski
- Succeeded by: Gerald M. Feierstein

United States Chargé d'Affaires ad interim to Syria
- In office 2005–2006

Personal details
- Profession: Diplomat

Stephen A. Seche (born 1948) was the United States Ambassador to Yemen from September 2007 to May 2010.

== Biography ==
Stephen Seche was born in 1948. He received a B.A. in journalism from the University of Massachusetts Amherst in 1974. After working as a journalist for four years, he joined the Foreign Service in 1978. From 1978 to 1985, he was a diplomat in Guatemala, Peru and Bolivia. From 1989 to 1993, he served as Information Officer at the U.S. Embassy in Ottawa, Ontario, Canada. From 1993 to 1997, he served as Press Attache at the U.S. Embassy in New Delhi, India. He studied Arabic at the Foreign Service Institute's Field School in Tunis for two years.

From 1999 to 2002, Seche was Counselor for Public Affairs and Director of the American Cultural Center in Damascus, Syria. From 2002 to 2005, he served as Director of the Office for Egypt and Levant Affairs at the Department of State in Washington, D.C. From February 2005 to August 2006, he served as Chargé d'Affaires at the U.S. Embassy in Damascus. In 2006-2007, he taught at the University of Southern California as a visiting fellow. He became the United States Ambassador to Yemen on September 5, 2007, up until September 2010. He was a research associate at the Institute for the Study of Diplomacy, Georgetown University. Seche served as the executive vice president of the Arab Gulf States Institute in Washington, DC from 2015 to 2020.

Seche speaks Arabic, English, French and Spanish.

Diplomatic posts
Preceded by Margaret Scobey	United States Chargé d'Affaires ad interim to Syria; 2005-2006	Succeeded by Michael H. Corbin
Preceded by Thomas C. Krajeski	United States Ambassador to Yemen; 2007–2010	Succeeded by Gerald M. Feierstein
