= April Glaspie =

American diplomat (born 1942)

April Catherine Glaspie
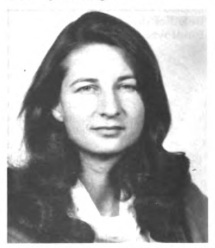

13th United States Ambassador to Iraq
- In office September 5, 1988 – July 30, 1990
- President: Ronald Reagan; George H. W. Bush
- Preceded by: David George Newton
- Succeeded by: Joseph C. Wilson

Personal details
- Born: April 26, 1942 (age 84) Vancouver, British Columbia, Canada
- Education: Johns Hopkins University's Paul H. Nitze School of Advanced International Studies
- Profession: Diplomat

April Catherine Glaspie (born April 26, 1942) is an American former diplomat and senior member of the Foreign Service, best known for her role in the events leading up to the Gulf War.

== Early life ==
Glaspie was born in Vancouver, British Columbia, and graduated from Mills College in Oakland, California, in 1963, and from Johns Hopkins University's Paul H. Nitze School of Advanced International Studies in 1965.

In 1966 Glaspie entered the United States foreign service, where she became an expert on the Middle East. In 1969, Glaspie won the Meritorious Honor Award from the State Department. She was also the winner of the 1977 Director General's Award for Reporting and as a result her name was inscribed on a permanent plaque in the Department's Foreign Service Lounge. After postings in Kuwait, Syria, and Egypt, Glaspie was appointed ambassador to Iraq in 1988. She was the first woman to be appointed an American ambassador to an Arab country. She had a reputation as a respected Arabist, and her instructions were to broaden cultural and commercial contacts with the Iraqi regime.

Subsequently, Glaspie was posted to the U.S. Mission to the United Nations in New York City. She was later posted to South Africa as Consul general in Cape Town. She held this post until her retirement in 2002.

== Career ==
=== United States Ambassador to Iraq ===
==== Meetings with Saddam Hussein ====
Glaspie's appointment as U.S. ambassador to Iraq followed a period from 1980 to 1989 during which the United States had given covert support to Iraq during its war with Iran.

Glaspie had her first meeting with Iraqi President Saddam Hussein and his Deputy Prime Minister, Tariq Aziz, on July 25, 1990. In her telegram from July 25, 1990, to the Department of State, Glaspie summarized the meeting as follows:

Saddam told the ambassador on July 25 that Mubarak has arranged for Kuwaiti and Iraqi delegations to meet in Riyadh, and then on July 28, 29 or 30, the Kuwaiti crown prince will come to Baghdad for serious negotiations. "Nothing serious will happen" before then, Saddam had promised Mubarak.

One version of the transcript has Glaspie saying:

We can see that you have deployed massive numbers of troops in the south. Normally that would be none of our business, but when this happens in the context of your threats against Kuwait, then it would be reasonable for us to be concerned. For this reason, I have received an instruction to ask you, in the spirit of friendship — not confrontation — regarding your intentions: Why are your troops massed so very close to Kuwait's borders?

Later the transcript has Glaspie saying:

We have no opinion on your Arab-Arab conflicts, such as your dispute with Kuwait. Secretary Baker has directed me to emphasize the instruction, first given to Iraq in the 1960s, that the Kuwait issue is not associated with America.

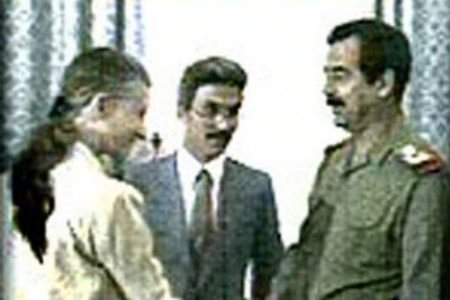
April Glaspie meets Saddam Hussein in 1990 (Sadoun al-Zubaydi center)

Another version of the transcript (the one published in The New York Times on 23 September 1990) has Glaspie saying:

But we have no opinion on the Arab-Arab conflicts, like your border disagreement with Kuwait. I was in the American Embassy in Kuwait during the late 1960s. The instruction we had during this period was that we should express no opinion on this issue and that the issue is not associated with America. James Baker has directed our official spokesmen to emphasize this instruction. We hope you can solve this problem using any suitable methods via Klibi (Chedli Klibi, Secretary General of the Arab League) or via President Mubarak. All that we hope is that these issues are solved quickly.

When these purported transcripts were made public, Glaspie was accused of having given tacit approval for the Iraqi invasion of Kuwait, which took place on August 2, 1990. It was argued that Glaspie's statements that "We have no opinion on your Arab-Arab conflicts" and that "the Kuwait issue is not associated with America" were interpreted by Saddam as giving free rein to handle his disputes with Kuwait as he saw fit. It was also argued that Saddam would not have invaded Kuwait had he been given an explicit warning that such an invasion would be met with force by the United States. Journalist Edward Mortimer wrote in the New York Review of Books in November 1990:

It seems far more likely that Saddam Hussein went ahead with the invasion because he believed the US would not react with anything more than verbal condemnation. That was an inference he could well have drawn from his meeting with US Ambassador April Glaspie on July 25, and from statements by State Department officials in Washington at the same time publicly disavowing any US security commitments to Kuwait, but also from the success of both the Reagan and the Bush administrations in heading off attempts by the US Senate to impose sanctions on Iraq for previous breaches of international law.

In September 1990, a pair of British journalists confronted Glaspie with the transcript of her meeting with Saddam Hussein, to which she replied that "Obviously, I didn't think, and nobody else did, that the Iraqis were going to take all of Kuwait."

In April 1991 Glaspie testified before the Senate Foreign Relations Committee. She said that at the July 25 meeting she had "repeatedly warned Iraqi President Saddam Hussein against using force to settle his dispute with Kuwait." She also said that Saddam had lied to her by denying he would invade Kuwait. Asked to explain how Saddam could have interpreted her comments as implying U.S. approval for the invasion of Kuwait, she replied: "We foolishly did not realize he [Saddam] was stupid." In July 1991 State Department spokesperson Richard Boucher said at a press briefing:

We have faith in Ambassador Glaspie's reporting. She sent us cables on her meetings based on notes that were made after the meeting. She also provided five hours or more of testimony in front of the Committee about the series of meetings that she had, including this meeting with Saddam Hussein.

The cables that Glaspie sent from Iraq about her meeting with Saddam are no longer classified. Glaspie's cable on her meeting with Saddam reports that President George H. W. Bush "had instructed her to broaden and deepen our relations with Iraq." Saddam, in turn, offered "warm greetings" to Bush and was "surely sincere" about not wanting war, the cable said.

Glaspie herself for years remained silent on the subject of her actions in Iraq. But in March 2008 she gave an interview to the Lebanese newspaper Dar Al-Hayat. In the interview, she said she has no regrets. "It is over," Glaspie said.

Nobody wants to take the blame. I am quite happy to take the blame. Perhaps I was not able to make Saddam Hussein believe that we would do what we said we would do, but in all honesty, I don't think anybody in the world could have persuaded him.

In the interview, Glaspie recalled that her meeting with Saddam was interrupted when the Iraqi president received a phone call from Egyptian President Hosni Mubarak. Saddam told her he had assured Mubarak that he would try to settle the dispute, she said. Her cable backs up this version of events; the Iraqi transcript, prepared by Saddam's official English language translator, Sadoun al-Zubaydi, records Saddam saying that Mubarak called before he met with Glaspie.

=== Retrospective views ===
In 2002, the Washington Report on Middle East Affairs published a new account of the Glaspie-Saddam meeting by Andrew Killgore, a former U.S. ambassador to Qatar. Killgore summarized the meeting as follows:

At their meeting, the American ambassador explained to Saddam that the United States did not take a stand on Arab-Arab conflicts, such as Iraq’s border disagreement with Kuwait. She made it clear, however, that differences should be settled by peaceful means.

Glaspie’s concerns were greatly eased when Saddam told her that the forthcoming Iraq-Kuwait meeting in Jeddah was for protocol purposes, to be followed by substantive discussions to be held in Baghdad.

In response to the ambassador’s question, Saddam named a date when Kuwaiti Crown Prince Shaikh Sa’ad Abdallah would be arriving in Baghdad for those substantive discussions. (This appears in retrospect to have been Saddam’s real deception.)

The points referenced in the second and third paragraphs do not appear in the purported transcripts of the Glaspie-Saddam meeting that were released by Iraq, and on which most of the subsequent criticism of Glaspie is based. If there is a full transcript of the meeting in existence, or if the State Department declassifies Glaspie's cables about the meeting, a different assessment might be reached on her performance.

James Akins, the U.S. Ambassador to Saudi Arabia at the time, offered a somewhat different perspective in a 2000 interview on PBS:

[Glaspie] took the straight American line, which is we do not take positions on border disputes between friendly countries. That's standard. That's what you always say. You would not have said, 'Mr. President, if you really are considering invading Kuwait, by God, we'll bring down the wrath of God on your palaces, and on your country, and you'll all be destroyed.' She wouldn't say that, nor would I. Neither would any diplomat.

Joseph C. Wilson, Glaspie's Deputy Chief of Mission in Baghdad, referred to her meeting with Saddam Hussein in a May 14, 2004 interview on Democracy Now!: an "Iraqi participant in the meeting [...] said to me very clearly that Saddam did not misunderstand, did not think he was getting a green or yellow light."

Wilson's and Akins' views on this question are in line with those of former Deputy Prime Minister Tariq Aziz, who stated in a 1996 interview with Frontline that, prior to the invasion of Kuwait, Iraq "had no illusions" about the likelihood of U.S. military intervention. Similarly, in a 2000 Frontline interview, Aziz declared, "There were no mixed signals", and further elaborated:

...it was a routine meeting. ... She didn't say anything extraordinary beyond what any professional diplomat would say without previous instructions from his government. She did not ask for an audience with the president [Saddam]. She was summoned by the president. ... She was not prepared.... People in Washington were asleep, so she needed a half-hour to contact anybody in Washington and seek instructions. So, what she said were routine, classical comments on what the president was asking her to convey to President Bush.

Kenneth Pollack of the Brookings Institution, writing in The New York Times on February 21, 2003, disagreed with the previously cited views of observers like Edward Mortimer. On Mortimer's stated belief that it was likely Saddam Hussein went ahead with the invasion because he drew as inference from his meeting with Glaspie that the US would react with nothing more than verbal condemnation, Pollack said:

In fact, all the evidence indicates the opposite: Saddam Hussein believed it was highly likely that the United States would try to liberate Kuwait but convinced himself that we would send only lightly armed, rapidly deployable forces that would be quickly destroyed by his 120,000-man Republican Guard. After this, he assumed, Washington would acquiesce to his conquest.

Professors John Mearsheimer and Stephen Walt write in the January/February 2003 edition of Foreign Policy that Saddam approached the U.S. to find out how it would react to an invasion into Kuwait. Along with Glaspie's comment that "'[W]e have no opinion on the Arab–Arab conflicts, like your border disagreement with Kuwait', the U.S. State Department had earlier told Saddam that Washington had 'no special defense or security commitments to Kuwait.' The United States may not have intended to give Iraq a green light, but that is effectively what it did."

Following the US diplomatic cables leak and the January 2011 publication of Glaspie's July 1990 cable describing her discussion with Saddam, Juan Cole noted that Glaspie "pressed the dictator on the meaning of his troop build-up on the Kuwaiti border, letting him clearly know of American anxieties," and argued that "her infamous reference to the U.S. not getting involved in inter-Arab disputes referred to a limited issue, the exact border between Iraq and Kuwait, and could not possibly have been interpreted as permission to invade Kuwait!" Cole concluded: "Ms. Glaspie's detractors owe her an apology."

In his 2024 book The Achilles Trap, Steve Coll argues that Glaspie became a convenient scapegoat for broader United States Government failures to recognize and respond to Saddam Hussein's intention to invade Kuwait. Coll suggests Glaspie was especially constrained by the positive attitudes toward Saddam of the Bush administration at that time:

[Glaspie] became a convenient distraction from the fact that her boss, President Bush, wrote several ingratiating letters to Saddam during 1990. Glaspie was in no position to threaten Saddam with America's military might, absent instructions; Bush was commander in chief.

Additionally, Coll points to Saddam's admission years later, and recent supporting evidence, that the meeting with Glaspie had little impact on his intention to invade, which at the time of the meeting was already decided.

=== United Nations ambassador in Somalia ===
Glaspie served as a United Nations ambassador during pivotal events in 1993 in the United Nations Operation in Somalia II during the Somali Civil War.

United Nations Security Council Resolution 794 was unanimously passed on December 3, 1992, which approved a coalition of United Nations peacekeepers led by the United States. Forming the Unified Task Force (UNITAF), the alliance was tasked with assuring security until humanitarian efforts aimed at stabilizing the situation were transferred to the UN. Landing in 1993, the UN peacekeeping coalition started the two-year United Nations Operation in Somalia II (UNOSOM II) primarily in the south. UNITAF's original mandate was to use "all necessary means" to guarantee the delivery of humanitarian aid in accordance to Chapter VII of the United Nations Charter.

Major disagreements between the UN and the Somali National Alliance (SNA) began soon after the establishment of UNOSOM II, centering on the perceived true nature of the operations political mandate. In early May 1993, SNA head General Mohammed Farah Aidid and Colonel Abdullahi Yusuf of the Somali Salvation Democratic Front (SSDF) agreed to convene a peace conference for central Somalia. In light of recent conflict between the two, the initiative was seen a major step towards halting the Somali Civil War. Gen. Aidid, having initiated the talks with Col. Yusuf, considered himself the conference chair, setting the agenda. Beginning 9 May, elder delegations from their respective clans, Habr Gidr and Majerteen, met. While Aidid and Yusuf aimed for a central Somalia-focused conference, they clashed with UNOSOM, which aimed to include other regions and replace Aidid's chairmanship with ex-President Abdullah Osman, a staunch critic of Aidid. As the conference began, Aidid sought assistance from UNOSOM ambassador Lansana Kouyate, who proposed air transport for delegates and a 14-day accommodation. However, he was called back to New York and replaced by April Glaspie, following which UNOSOM retracted its offer. Aidid resorted to private aircraft to transport delegates. Following the aircraft incident, Aidid would publicly rebuke the United Nations on Radio Mogadishu for interference in Somali internal affairs.

The contention between the Somali National Alliance and UNOSOM from this point forward would begin to manifest in anti-UNOSOM propaganda broadcast from SNA controlled Radio Mogadishu.

==== Radio Mogadishu ====
Radio Mogadishu was a popular broadcasting station controlled by the SNA. It had in recent weeks begun airing anti American and anti-UNOSOM propaganda condemning interference in Somali politics after UN envoy Admiral Johnathan Howe had rejected the May peace conference Aidid had set up. On the airwaves Aidid would publicly accuse UNOSOM II of engaging in colonialism and "imperialist designs". These broadcasts greatly incensed UNOSOM officials and consequently a significant debate occurred over how best to deal with the station. According to then UNOSOM advisor John Drysdale, the UN's 'obsession' with the station was largely driven by US diplomat April Glaspie. She held the view that the station should be destroyed or transferred to UNOSOM control, and felt so passionately about the issue that she had threatened to resign if the station was not dealt with. While certain UN officials felt that Radio Mogadishu broadcasts had become a threat to UNOSOM's image, other officials and advisors noted that the broadcasts rhetoric was relatively mild and well within the bounds of reasonable speech. Drysdale argues that, "There was virtually nothing in these broadcasts during May to which UNOSOM could have taken exception to. The language was moderate; there was no incitement, no subversion."

From 1 May to 3 June 1993, Aidid spoke on the station publicly eight times. Four of the broadcasts were critical of UNOSOM, and focused on the UN's handling of the May peace conference. There were also three uncritical statements of UNOSOM, during which he thanked officials publicly for aiding Somalia's rehabilitation. The most serious public criticism was on 3 June 1993, when Aidid accused the UN of interference in the creation of a judiciary.

On May 31, 1993, Aidids political rivals met with Johnathan Howe and attempted to convince him to take over Radio Mogadishu, a meeting Aidid was made well aware of. Rumor quickly began spreading across the city that the UNOSOM had actually resolved to shut down Radio Mogadishu entirely, which further angered Aidid, rumors which were corroborated after the fact by the US special envoy to Somalia, Robert B. Oakley. The belief that UNOSOM was planning to seize the station was reportedly widespread among Mogadishu residents. Mohammed Sahnoun, the representative of the UN Secretary-General in Somalia during UNOSOM I, reported that rumours of an attempted UN shut down of the station had reached him days before the incident. According to ambassador Oakley, Aidid saw the targeting of his SNA controlled station as specifically unfair on account of his main political rival Ali Mahdi also having a radio station that UNOSOM was not threatening, due to Mahdi's claim that it was private.

==== Radio Mogadishu and 5 June 1993 inspection ====
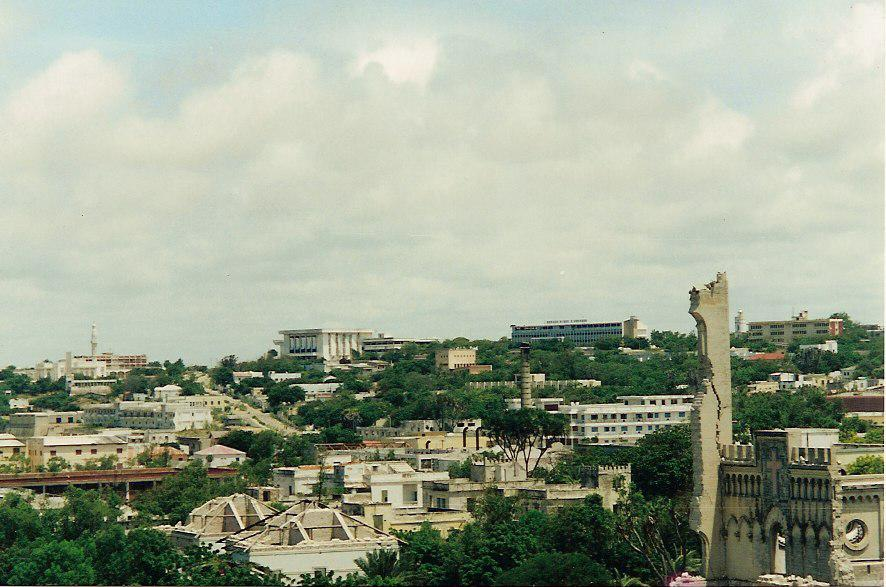
Mogadishu skyline from UNOSOM convoy (1993)

Radio Mogadishu was considered a vital piece of SNA infrastructure that had been captured following a vicious battle with Ali Mahdi's forces. Following the Kismayo and Galkayo incidents that station began to air anti-UNOSOM propaganda, incensing high ranking UN personnel. It was feared that the broadcasts would shift the attitudes of the Somali public towards the United Nations operation, leading UNOSOM officials to resolve to close the station. In mid-May, the Pakistani contingent was asked to draw up a plan to shut down the station. The Pakistanis did not possess the technical expertise required for such an operation and requested that the US supply experts.

Importantly, Radio Mogadishu had also been an Authorized Weapons Store Site (AWSS), subject to UNOSOM inspection. It was decided the American special forces technicians would accompany a Pakistani weapons inspection team to the site in order to determine how to disable the station. Gen. Aidid and the upper echelons of the Somali National Alliance, had been made aware of the discussions to seize or destroy the station.

According to the 1994 United Nations Inquiry:

Opinions differ, even among UNOSOM officials, on whether the weapons inspections of 5 June 1993 was genuine or was merely a cover-up for reconnaissance and subsequent seizure of Radio Mogadishu.

On the morning of June 5, 1993 an element of the Pakistani force in Somalia had been tasked with the inspection of site AWSS 5, which happened to be located at Aidid controlled Radio Mogadishu. The station was popular across the city, even among those who did not like Aidid or the Habr Gidr clan and concern that UNOSOM was coming to shut it down infuriated many citizens of Mogadishu. The fighting would result in 24 Pakistanis and dozens of Somalis killed. UNOSOM believed forces associated with Aidid were behind the attack. The 1994 UN Inquiry would conclude that in absence of a "...more convincing explanation," it believed the Somali National Alliance was most likely behind the attack. Despite this, the commission noted that no evidence existed to back previous UNOSOM assertions that the attack had been pre-planned or pre-meditated by the SNA, and further noted that the incident had likely been a spontaneous reaction.

== In popular culture ==
Glaspie was portrayed by Jacqueline King in the limited series House of Saddam.

Diplomatic posts
Preceded by David George Newton	United States Ambassador to Iraq; 1988–1990	Succeeded by post abolished
