= Coalition Provisional Authority Order 17 =

Order made by the Coalition Provisional Authority in Iraq

Coalition Provisional Authority Order 17 stated that Iraqi laws do not hold over contractors.

Just before leaving office as head of the Coalition Provisional Authority in June 2004, Paul Bremer signed the order, which says:

Contractors shall not be subject to Iraqi laws or regulations in matters relating to the terms and conditions of their Contracts, including licensing and registering employees, businesses and corporations; provided, however, that Contractors shall comply with such applicable licensing and registration laws and regulations if engaging in business or transactions in Iraq other than Contracts. Notwithstanding any provisions in this Order, Private Security Companies and their employees operating in Iraq must comply with all CPA Orders, Regulations, Memoranda, and any implementing instructions or regulations governing the existence and activities of Private Security Companies in Iraq, including registration and licensing of weapons and firearms.

It took effect in December 2006. At that time, there were thought to be at least 100,000 private military contractors working directly for the United States Department of Defense, a tenfold increase since the Persian Gulf War just over a decade earlier. This activity led to the foundation of a trade group called the Private Security Company Association of Iraq.

== Responses ==
In Iraq, the issue of accountability, especially in the case of contractors carrying weapons, is sensitive. One major incident in 2007 involved Blackwater guards who killed 17 Iraqi civilians in a mass shooting in Nisour Square. Iraq's government maintained that this was murder but was unable to prosecute the guards because they had immunity.

A month after the Nisour Square massacre, the Iraqi cabinet approved draft legislation intended to end contractors' immunity. Contractors would be required to license their weapons, to register their equipment including armored vehicles and helicopters, and (if foreign) to obtain visas, something not previously required when working for an agency of a country in the coalition. At the same time, the U.S. House of Representatives passed the MEJA Expansion and Enforcement Act (H.R. 2740) which would have made U.S. security contractors in Iraq subject to U.S. criminal law; however, the Senate never voted on it.

In December 2008, a Status of Forces Agreement between Iraq and the US made contractors subject to Iraqi criminal law.
