= Gerald M. Feierstein =

American diplomat

Ambassador Gerald Michael Feierstein
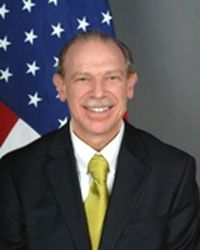
- Gerald M. Feierstein in official U.S. State Department photo
- Born: 1951 (age 74–75); Philadelphia, Pennsylvania, U.S.
- Education: Point Park College: B.A. Philosophy (1973); Duquesne University: M.A. International Relations (1975)
- Occupation: Career diplomat
- Years active: 1975–present
- Employer(s): Senior Foreign Service, Career Minister (FE-CM)
- Predecessor: Stephen Seche
- Successor: Matthew Tueller
- Spouses: Carolyn McIntyre (m. 2015) Mary Gill Feierstein (m. 1978; div. 2015)
- Children: 3

Gerald Michael Feierstein (born 1951) was the United States Ambassador to Yemen under President Barack Obama from September 2010 to October 2013. Since December 2013, Feierstein has served as Principal Deputy Assistant Secretary of State for Near East Affairs in the Department of State.

== Background ==
Feierstein was born in 1951 in Philadelphia, Pennsylvania.

He received a B.A. in Philosophy from Point Park College in 1973 and an M.A. in International Relations from Duquesne University in 1975.

In June 1975, he joined the Foreign Service.

== Career ==
=== Diplomatic service ===
In June 1975, Feierstein joined the Foreign Service as Director of the Office of Regional Affairs in the Near East Bureau. He subsequently served as: Director of the Office of Pakistan, Afghanistan, and Bangladesh Affairs; Deputy Director in the Office of Arabian Peninsula Affairs; and Desk Officer for Nepal, Pakistan and Egypt.

Between 2006 and 2008, Feierstein served in Washington, D.C. as Principal Deputy Assistant Coordinator and Deputy Assistant Coordinator for Programs in the Office of the Coordinator for Counterterrorism.

Feierstein has served at the following overseas posts:

Years	Location	Mission	Notes
1976–78	Islamabad	Pakistan	
1983–85	Tunis	Tunisia	
1985–87	Riyadh	Saudi Arabia	
1989–92	Peshawar	Pakistan	
1995–98	Muscat	Oman	Chargé d'affaires
1998–2001	Jerusalem	Israel	Deputy consul general
2003–04	Beirut	Lebanon	
2008–10	Islamabad	Pakistan	Deputy Chief of Mission
2010–13	Sana'a	Yemen	Ambassador

In 2012, al Qaeda in Yemen offered 3 kilograms (96 ozt) of gold (about US$160,000) for killing Ambassador Feierstein, and 5 million Yemeni rials (about US$23,000) for killing an American soldier in Yemen.

=== Later ===
Since October 2016, Feierstein has served as a Senior Fellow and Director for Gulf Affairs and Government Relations at the Middle East Institute.

In November 2018, the MEI Board of Directors named Feierstein as Senior Vice President of the Institute.

== Personal life ==
Feierstein met his first wife, Mary, who is Pakistani, while first posted in Islamabad. His son served two combat tours in the United States Marine Corps during the Iraq War. In 2015, the marriage ended in divorce. In 2015, Feierstein married Carolyn McIntyre.

Diplomatic posts
Preceded by Stephen A. Seche	United States Ambassador to Yemen; 2010–2013	Succeeded by Matthew H. Tueller
