= Sadoun al-Zubaydi =

Iraqi literature professor (born 1950)

Ambassador of Iraq to Indonesia
- In office 1995–2001

Personal details
- Born: January 1, 1950 (age 76) Iraq
- Education: University of Baghdad

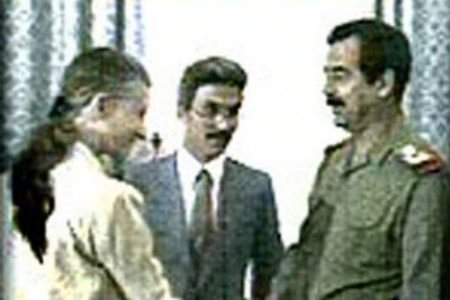
Sadoun al-Zubaydi (center) present at Saddam Hussein's July 25, 1990 meeting with April Glaspie, then-U.S. ambassador to Iraq

Sadoun al-Zubaydi (born January 1, 1950) is a British-educated former English literature professor at the University of Baghdad, best known for his role as the official English language translator to former President Saddam Hussein of Iraq. A secularist, al-Zubaydi has refused to identify himself as Sunni or a Shi’ite.

== Translator ==
Al-Zubaydi was a frequent fixture beside Saddam Hussein on television screens across the world and was present at several high-level meetings between Saddam and foreign dignitaries during the Iran–Iraq War, Iraq's invasion of Kuwait, the 1991 Gulf War and the months preceding the U.S. invasion of Iraq in 2003. A low-ranking Iraqi Ba'ath Party member, al-Zubaydi was witness to some of Saddam's most crucial talks, including a controversial July 25, 1990 meeting between Saddam and then-U.S. Ambassador April Glaspie, just days prior to Iraq's invasion of Kuwait. He also translated Saddam's widely broadcast remarks during the Iraqi President's August 23, 1990 meeting with Western hostages to whom Iraq had refused exit visas as the crisis in the Persian Gulf emerged. During those remarks, al-Zubaydi can be heard famously asking if a young British boy named Stuart Lockwood is getting his milk while Saddam ruffles the young boy's hair.

== Iraqi Ambassador to Indonesia (1995–2001) ==
Al-Zubaydi served as Iraq's ambassador to Indonesia from 1995 to 2001, during which time he publicly challenged the U.N. sanctions regime against Iraq. As a result, al-Zubaydi earned the nickname "Voice of the Arabs", inspired by a popular Cairo-based radio program of the same name which trumpeted Pan-Arabism and opposition to foreign rule during the 1950s and 1960s.

== Current whereabouts ==
Al-Zubaydi emerged from self-imposed obscurity in 2005 to advise Sunni negotiators in talks over the drafting of Iraq's constitution. He has been specifically targeted by numerous militia and Al-Qaeda affiliates. As of March 2008, al-Zubaydi was living in exile in Syria.

Zubaydi was interviewed by TRT World from Amman, Jordan in 2016 discussing the protests at the time.

== See also ==
- Gulf War
- Iraqi National Dialogue Council
- Minister of Foreign Affairs (Iraq)
