= Frances Winfield =

American author and spokesperson (1942–2019)

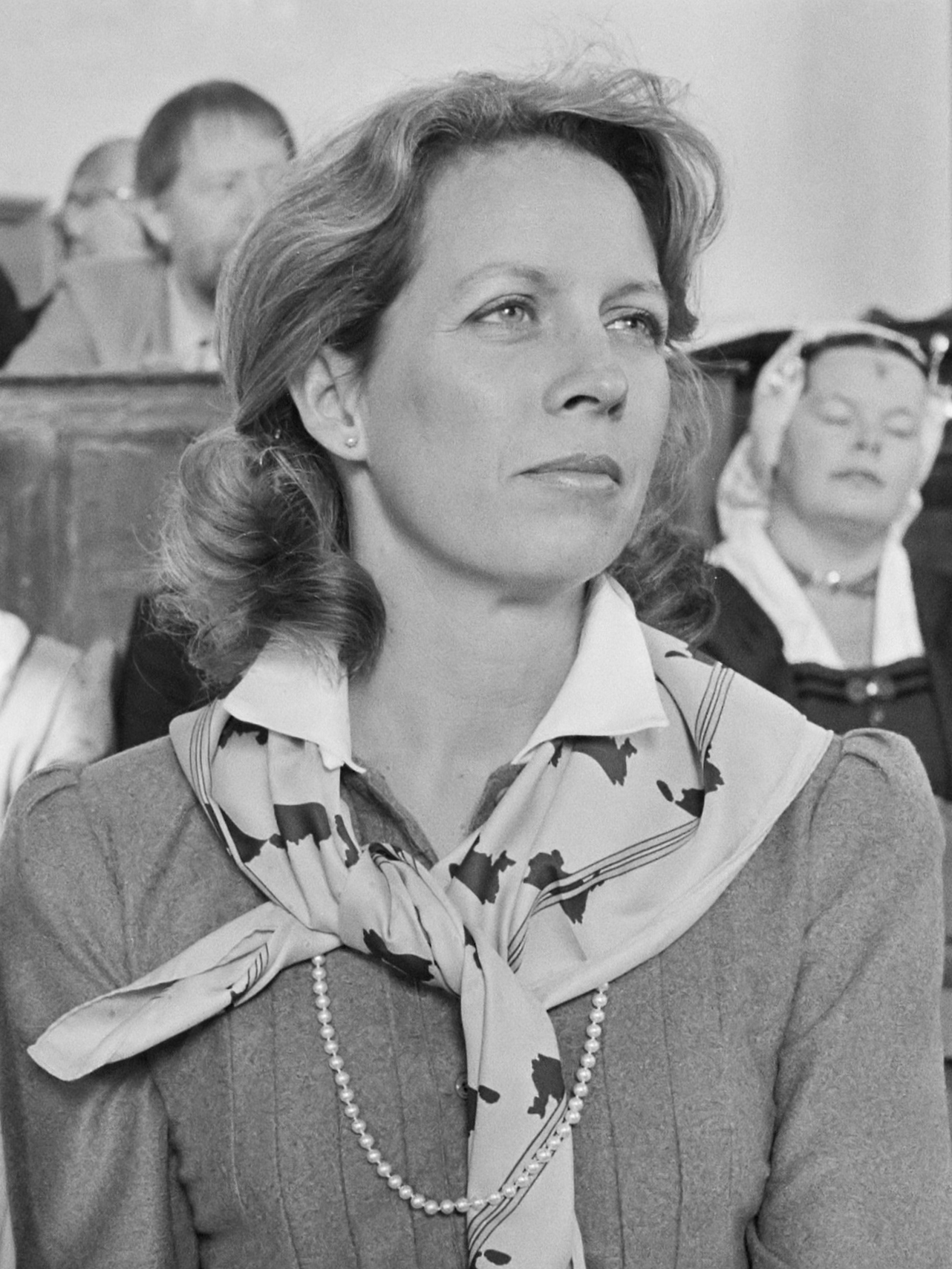
- Winfield in 1983
- Born: 1942; Saint Paul, Minnesota, U.S.
- Died: April 21, 2019 (aged 76–77); Chevy Chase, Maryland, U.S.
- Education: Connecticut College
- Occupations: Author, Spokesperson
- Spouse: Paul Bremer (m. 1966)
- Children: 2

Frances Winfield (1942 – April 21, 2019), was an American author and spokesperson.

== Biography ==
Winfield was born in Saint Paul, Minnesota in 1942, and grew up in St. Louis and Old Greenwich, Connecticut. Winfield was graduated from Connecticut College in 1964. She met Paul Bremer at a Dixieland concert. They became college sweethearts and married in 1966. Bremer, a State Department official, served as the Administrator of the Coalition Provisional Authority of Iraq, Coordinator for Counterterrorism, United States Ambassador to the Netherlands, and Executive Secretary of the United States Department of State.

A devout Roman Catholic, she and her husband were extraordinary ministers of Holy Communion at their local parish in Maryland. They had two adult children.

After being diagnosed with Fibromyalgia, Winfield she became a spokeswoman for the National Fibromyalgia Association.

Winfield died on April 21, 2019, at home in Chevy Chase, Maryland.

== Selected works ==
- Running to Paradise, 2000, ISBN 1-892668-24-6
- Coping With His Success: A Survival Guide for Wives at the Top, 1984, ISBN 0-06-015247-8
- Walk A Mile In Her Shoes
