= Edmund Hull =

American diplomat

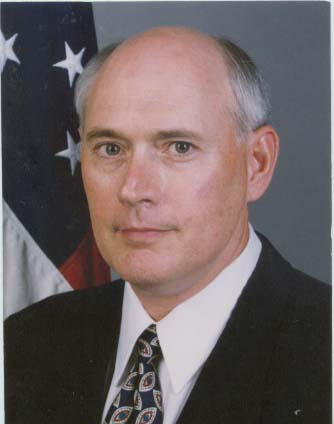

United States Ambassador to Yemen
- In office October 1, 2001 – March 13, 2004
- President: George W. Bush
- Preceded by: Barbara Bodine
- Succeeded by: Thomas C. Krajeski

Personal details
- Born: 1949 (age 76–77)
- Education: Princeton University; University of Oxford

Edmund James Hull (born 1949) is an American diplomat. He was the United States Ambassador to Yemen from 2001 to 2004, under George W. Bush.

== Biography ==
Edmund James Hull was born in Keokuk, Iowa in 1949. He is a graduate of Princeton University and the University of Oxford. He was a Peace Corps volunteer in Mahdia, Tunisia.

From 1993 to 1996, he served as a diplomat in Cairo, Egypt. From 1996 to 1999, he served as Director for UN Peacekeeping Operations in the Bureau of International Organization Affairs. He has also served as Director for Near Eastern Affairs at the National Security Council, and Director of the Office of Iran and Iraq Affairs at the Department of State. As a diplomat, he has also served in Tunis and Jerusalem. From 2001 to 2004, he served as United States Ambassador to Yemen. In the spring of 2010, he taught at Princeton University.

Diplomatic posts
Preceded by Barbara Bodine	United States Ambassador to Yemen; 2001–2004	Succeeded by Thomas C. Krajeski
