= David George Newton =

American diplomat

United States Ambassador to Iraq
- In office 1985–1988
- Preceded by: Enoch S. Duncan
- Succeeded by: April Glaspie

United States Ambassador to Yemen
- In office 1994–1997
- Preceded by: Arthur Hayden Hughes
- Succeeded by: Barbara Bodine

Personal details
- Born: November 13, 1935 Boston, Massachusetts
- Died: 2016 (aged 80–81)
- Education: Harvard College, University of Michigan

David George Newton (November 13, 1935 – 2016) was the United States Ambassador to Iraq under Ronald Reagan from 1985 to 1988, and to Yemen under Bill Clinton from 1994 to 1997.

== Biography ==
David George Newton was born in Boston, Massachusetts. He received a B.A. from Harvard College in 1957 and an MA from the University of Michigan in 1970.

From 1958 to 1961, he served in the United States Army. In 1961, he joined the Foreign Service. From 1962 to 1964, he served as a consul in Zurich, Switzerland. From 1964 to 1966, he learned Arabic at the Foreign Service Institute in Beirut, Lebanon. He then served as economic officer at the American embassy in Sanaa, Yemen until 1967. He worked in the Bureau of Near Eastern and South Asian Affair in Washington, D.C. until 1969. He served as political officer in Jedda, Saudi Arabia from 1970 to 1973, and as deputy chief of mission in Sanaa, Yemen, until 1975.

From 1975 to 1977, he served as Division Chief of Near Eastern Affairs in the Bureau of Intelligence and Research. From 1978 to 1981, he served in Damascus, Syria, then from 1981 to 1984 in Baghdad, Iraq. He served as United States Ambassador to Iraq from 1985 to 1988. From 1988 to 1990, he was the director of the Office for Syria, Lebanon, Jordan, Palestinian Affairs in Washington, D.C.

From 1990 to 1993, he served as Chair of National Security Policy at the National War College of the National Defense University. From 1993 to 1994, he worked in the Office of the Inspector General. He served as the United States Ambassador to Yemen from 1994 to 1997.

He was a member of the Middle East Institute and the Cosmos Club.

Diplomatic posts
Preceded by Enoch S. Duncan	United States Ambassador to Iraq; 1985–1988	Succeeded by April Glaspie
Preceded by Arthur Hayden Hughes	United States Ambassador to Yemen; 1994–1997	Succeeded by Barbara Bodine
