= William T. Monroe =

American diplomat

William T. Monroe (born 1950) was the 14th United States Ambassador to Bahrain. He was confirmed by the U.S. Senate on June 25, 2004, and was sworn in on August 3, 2004. He assumed his responsibilities in Manama on August 24, 2004.

He was succeeded by J. Adam Ereli in 2007.

== Education ==
Monroe attended Choate Rosemary Hall before receiving his B.A. in history from Stanford University and his M.A. in international relations from the Fletcher School of Law and Diplomacy.

== Career ==
Monroe joined the U.S. Foreign Service in 1978. An economic officer, Monroe worked for three years as an International Trade Specialist at the Department of Commerce before joining the Department of State. In the Department of State, he has worked in the Bureau of Political-Military Affairs and the Bureau of East Asian and Pacific Affairs. Monroe was the Deputy Chief of Mission at the U.S. Embassy, Islamabad, Pakistan, from April 2002 to June 2004. Prior to that, he was Deputy Chief of Mission at the U.S. Embassy in Kuwait.

Diplomatic posts
| Preceded by Ronald E. Neumann | United States Ambassador to Bahrain; 2007–2011 | Succeeded by J. Adam Ereli |
