= J. Adam Ereli =

American diplomat and ambassador

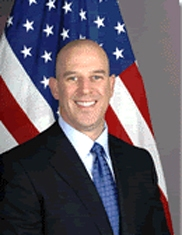

United States Ambassador to Bahrain
- In office 28 June 2007 – January 14, 2011
- President: George W. Bush; Barack Obama
- Preceded by: William T. Monroe
- Succeeded by: Thomas C. Krajeski

Personal details
- Born: 1960 (age 65–66)
- Education: Yale University, Tufts University

Joseph Adam Ereli (born 1960) is an American lobbyist, who formerly served as a diplomat and ambassador.

== Early life and diplomatic career ==
Ereli earned a B.A. in History from Yale University in 1982 and an M.A. in International Relations from the Fletcher School of Law and Diplomacy of Tufts University in 1989. He worked as a journalist and human rights activist in Paris, France.

In 1989, Ereli joined the U.S. Foreign Service. During postings abroad, he served in Africa and the Middle East, including in Cairo, Egypt; Damascus, Syria; Addis Ababa, Ethiopia; Sanaa, Yemen; and Baghdad, Iraq. From 2000 to 2003, he was the deputy chief of mission at the U.S. Embassy in Doha, Qatar. Ereli was sworn in as the 15th United States ambassador of the Kingdom of Bahrain on June 28, 2007, and held that post until 2011.

During postings in Washington, he served as the director of the Office of Press and Public Affairs in the Bureau of Near Eastern Affairs, and as deputy spokesman of the Department of State (2003–2006). His final position at the State Department, after being ambassador to Bahrain, was as principal deputy assistant secretary of state for educational and cultural affairs.

== Lobbying ==
Since 2013, Ereli has been a lobbyist, working to promote the interests of foreign governments, including Qatar, where he had previously served as a U.S. diplomat.

He began his new career by joining Mercury, a lobbying firm in Washington, DC, to serve as its vice chairman between 2013 and 2016. In 2016, he became the CEO of IberoAmerican, another consulting group.

Ereli has also been involved with Middle East focused think tanks in Washington, including as a board member of the Tahrir Institute for Middle East Policy (TIMEP). Until its closure in 2019, he also served as a board member of the Arabia Foundation, described as a "pro-Saudi" think tank.

Diplomatic posts
Preceded by William T. Monroe	United States Ambassador to Bahrain; June 28, 2007–June 2011	Succeeded by Thomas C. Krajeski
