= My Year in Iraq =

Book by Paul Bremer

My Year in Iraq: The Struggle to Build a Future of Hope
- First edition
- Author: Paul Bremer; Malcolm McConnell
- Language: English
- Genre: Memoir
- Publisher: Simon & Schuster
- Publication date: 1-January-2006
- Publication place: United States
- Media type: Print
- Pages: 432
- ISBN: 9781416540588

My Year in Iraq: The Struggle to Build a Future of Hope is a memoir by ambassador Paul Bremer, Administrator of the Coalition Provisional Authority. Published in the United States on 9 January 2006 it covers the period between May 2003 to July 2004. Bremer takes the readers through his struggle with Iraq's leaders to build democratic institutions. He also describes negotiations with Iraqi leaders to write an interim constitution with guarantees for women and minority rights. Bremer explain his work with Iraq's politicians to build a responsible and representative government while facing an atmosphere of division and distrust among Iraq's politicians. The Shia Arabs, the country's long-repressed majority, deeply distrusted the Sunni Arab minority who had held power for centuries. Iraq's non-Arab Kurds teetered on the brink of secession when Bremer arrived. He had to find Sunnis willing to participate in the new political order.

The book carries readers from the holy city of Najaf to the burning and lawless Baghdad; from the White House Situation Room to the Pentagon E-Ring.

The book argues that the coalition disbanded Saddam's army, the unbalanced force composed of Shiite draftees serving under Sunni officers. The soldiers deserted and refused to defend Saddam Hussein's regime.

A number of important issues are raised in the book including the capture of Saddam Hussein, the First Battle of Fallujah, and the crisis of Muqtada al-Sadr.
