= Tahrir Institute for Middle East Policy =

- Abbreviation: TIMEP
- Founded: 2013
- Headquarters: 1140 Connecticut Ave NW Suite 505
- Location: Washington, D.C., United States
- Website: http://www.timep.org

The Tahrir Institute for Middle East Policy (TIMEP) is a think tank based in Washington, D.C., United States focused on democratization processes in the Middle East. It is known for researching and publishing reports on Egypt's security situation.

== Projects ==
=== Legislation Tracker ===
TIMEP's Legislation Tracker offers a comprehensive database of the decrees and laws passed under sole presidential authority, presented in an interactive timeline format. All laws and decrees are also topically cataloged with commentary on the constitutional context in which such legislation exists.

=== Egypt Security Watch ===
The Egypt Security Watch project offers original content on the security situation in Egypt as a whole. The project components consist of:

- Interactive Map: The live map component of the website showcases both instances of terror attacks and counter-terror efforts from 2010 to the current day.
- Infographics: This section features graphics and charts to document trends and developments.
- Analysis: This section features the work of experts looking into the development of security threats, the efficacy and implications of counter-terror efforts, and offer prognosis for the medium- and long-term.
- Profiles: This section offers profiles of terrorist groups, their leaders and ideology, as well as those that hold positions of authority in state institutions tasked with combating terrorism.

=== Elections Monitoring ===
TIMEP's Elections Monitoring portal provided daily assessments of campaign developments leading up to the Egyptian presidential election in 2014 and timely information on the days of the elections. Following the elections, analyses of the election process and what the results of the election bode for Egypt's next president was presented.

=== Scholar Spotlight ===
A series of videos and podcasts featuring prominent scholars whose work has international policy implications and presenting their views on how to better use research to inform actionable policy.

=== Eshhad ===
Eshhad is an online platform developed to document reports of alleged religious persecution and sectarian incidents in Egypt. It includes a database of publicly available information and a map that displays the geographic distribution of reported cases. The platform also offers background information on minority groups and related commentary.

=== Transitional Justice Project ===
The Transitional Justice Project (TJP) is an initiative founded by non-resident Fellow Mai El-Sadany and supported by TIMEP staff. The project focuses on examining transitional justice processes in the Arab region. It explores definitions of transitional justice, potential policy approaches, past efforts in the region, and the roles of various actors including society, the state, and the international community.

== The Bassem Sabry Democracy Fellowship ==
The Bassem Sabry Democracy Fellowship was established on May 2, 2014, in memory of Egyptian political writer and commentator Bassem Sabry.

Offered in partnership with Atlas Corps, a leader in international exchange fellowships, this fellowship is open to youth from the Middle East or North Africa in the fields of journalism, international relations, political science, or other relevant fields, and aims to further the causes and principles Sabry believed in.

== Board of Advisors ==
- Ziad Asali, President and founder of the American Task Force on Palestine
- Graeme Bannerman, founder of Bannerman Associates
- Larry Diamond, senior fellow, Hoover Institution and Freeman Spogli Institute for International Studies
- Adam Ereli, Vice Chairman of Mercury's Washington
- Francis Fukuyama, professor at Stanford University
- Sultan Al Qassemi, commentator on Arab Affairs
- Nagla Rizk, Professor of Economics, American University in Cairo
- Marietje Schaake, Member of the European Parliament with the Alliance of Liberals and Democrats for Europe Party (ALDE)
- Ghada Shahbender, founding member of Shayfeencom
- Alex Shalaby, Chairman of the Egyptian Company for Mobile Services (Mobinil)
