= List of ambassadors of the United States to Yemen =

Ambassador of the United States to Yemen
- سفارة الولايات المتحدة الأمريكية في جمهورية اليمن
- Seal of the United States Department of State

- Flag of a United States ambassador

- Incumbent; Neil Hop; Chargé d'affaires since August 5, 2026
- Nominator: The president of the United States
- Inaugural holder: Charles Franklin Dunbar
- Formation: June 16, 1988
- Website: U.S. Embassy - Sana'a

This is a list of ambassadors of the United States to Yemen.

Before 1990, Yemen had consisted of two states: North Yemen and South Yemen. The United States had diplomatic relations with North Yemen since 1946. Relations with South Yemen had been established in 1967 and broken in 1969.

On May 22, 1990, the Yemen Arab Republic (North Yemen) and the People's Democratic Republic of Yemen (South Yemen) united and formed a united Republic of Yemen. The existing U.S. embassy in San'a (North Yemen) became the embassy for the new republic. At that time, there was no U.S. ambassador to South Yemen, so the then-current ambassador to North Yemen Charles Franklin Dunbar, continued to serve as the ambassador to united Yemen until the end of his tour in 1991.

The U.S. Embassy in Sanaa suspended operations on February 11, 2015, and all U.S. personnel were withdrawn after security conditions deteriorated in the midst of the Yemeni civil war; however, the United States did not sever diplomatic relations with Yemen. Working from the U.S. Embassy in Riyadh, Saudi Arabia under the authority of the U.S. Ambassador to Yemen, U.S. diplomats in the Yemen Affairs Unit maintained regular dialogue with the Republic of Yemen Government.

For U.S. ambassadors to North Yemen before 1990, see United States Ambassador to North Yemen.

For U.S. ambassadors to South Yemen prior to 1990, see United States Ambassador to South Yemen.

== List of ambassadors ==
#	Image	Ambassador	Appointed	Presentation	Term end	Appointer
1		Charles Franklin Dunbar	June 16, 1988	August 14, 1988	June 13, 1991	Ronald Reagan
2		Arthur Hayden Hughes	August 2, 1991	October 19, 1991	November 7, 1994	George H. W. Bush
3		David George Newton	October 5, 1994	January 8, 1995	December 16, 1997	Bill Clinton
4		Barbara Bodine	November 7, 1997	December 22, 1997	August 30, 2001	Bill Clinton
5		Edmund Hull	August 7, 2001	October 1, 2001	March 13, 2004	George W. Bush
6		Thomas C. Krajeski	May 12, 2004	August 16, 2004	April 16, 2007	George W. Bush
7		Stephen Seche	July 2, 2007	September 5, 2007	May 17, 2010	George W. Bush
8		Gerald M. Feierstein	September 17, 2010	September 25, 2010	September 27, 2013	Barack Obama
9		Matthew H. Tueller	May 8, 2014	May 27, 2014	May 16, 2019	Barack Obama
10		Christopher P. Henzel	January 7, 2019	May 20, 2019	May 2021	Donald Trump
10		Steven Fagin	April 7, 2022	June 1, 2022	July 3, 2026	Joe Biden

== See also ==
- United States - Yemen relations
- Foreign relations of Yemen
- Ambassadors of the United States
