= Paul Bremer =

American diplomat (born 1941)

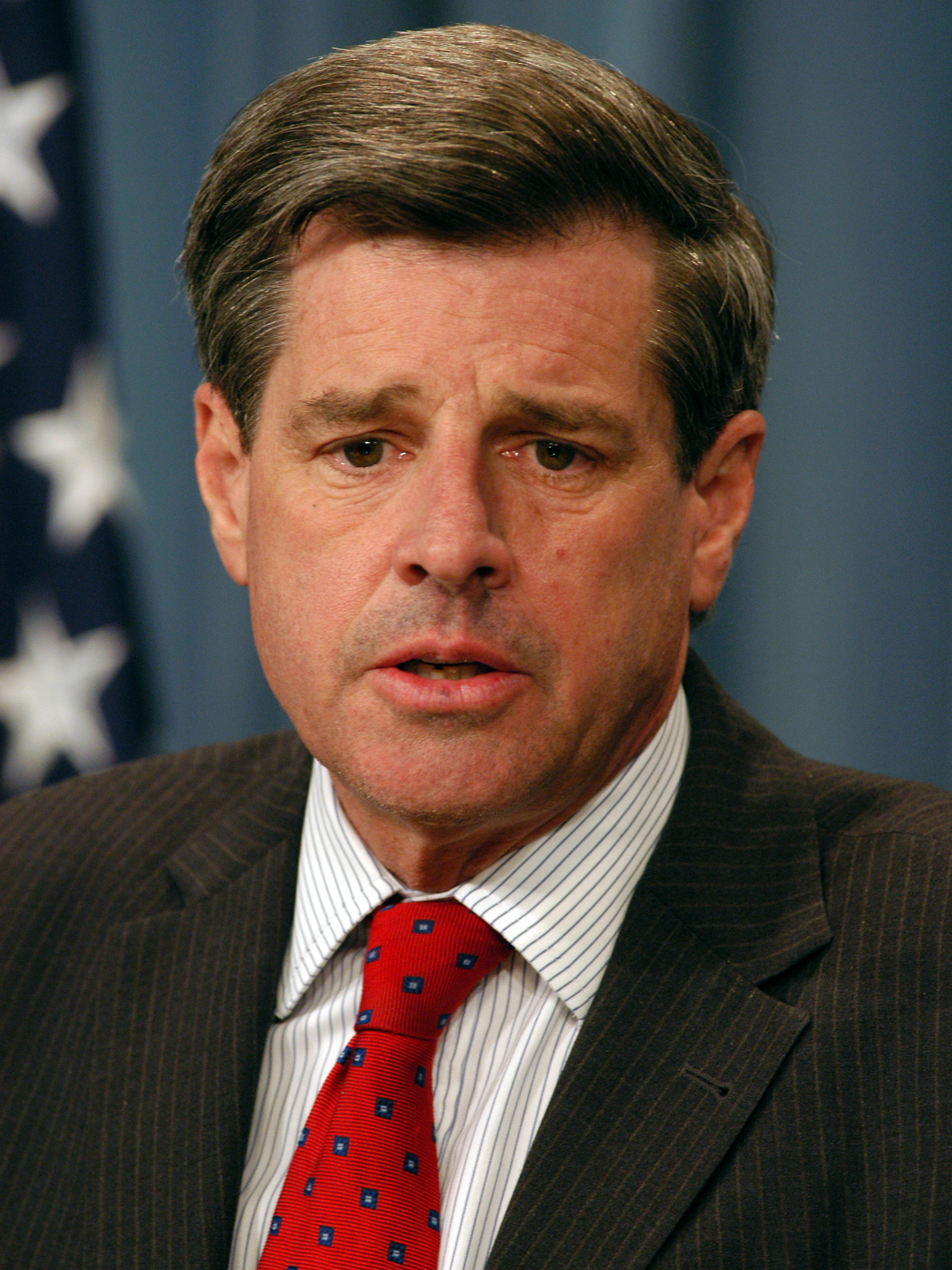
- Bremer in 2003

Administrator of the Coalition Provisional Authority of Iraq
- In office May 12, 2003 – June 28, 2004
- President: George W. Bush
- Deputy: Richard Jones
- IGC President: Mohammad Bahr al-Ulloum (acting); Ibrahim al-Jaafari; Ahmed Chalabi; Ayad Allawi; Jalal Talabani; Abdul Aziz al-Hakim; Adnan Pachachi; Mohsen Abdel Hamid; Mohammad Bahr al-Ulloum; Massoud Barzani; Ezzedine Salim; Ghazi Mashal Ajil al-Yawer
- Preceded by: Jay Garner (as Director of the Office for Reconstruction and Humanitarian Assistance)
- Succeeded by: Ghazi Mashal Ajil al-Yawer (as Interim President of Iraq)

6th Coordinator for Counterterrorism
- In office October 17, 1986 – May 25, 1989
- President: Ronald Reagan
- Preceded by: Robert B. Oakley
- Succeeded by: Morris Busby

United States Ambassador to the Netherlands
- In office August 31, 1983 – August 25, 1986
- President: Ronald Reagan
- Preceded by: William J. Dyess
- Succeeded by: John S. R. Shad

9th Executive Secretary of the United States Department of State
- In office February 2, 1981 – March 27, 1983
- President: Ronald Reagan
- Preceded by: Peter Tarnoff
- Succeeded by: Charles Hill

Personal details
- Born: Lewis Paul Bremer III; September 30, 1941 (age 85) Hartford, Connecticut, U.S.
- Party: Republican
- Spouse: Frances Winfield (m. 1966; died 2019)
- Children: 2
- Education: Yale University (BA); Harvard University (MBA); Paris Institute of Political Studies (CEP)

Lewis Paul Bremer III (born September 30, 1941) is a retired American diplomat. He was the second de facto chief civilian administrator of Iraq as leader of the Coalition Provisional Authority (CPA) following the 2003 invasion of Iraq by the United States, from May 2003 until June 2004. The Bremer administration in Iraq contributed to establishing the foundations of good governance, scheduling timely elections, facilitating the peaceful transition of power, and expanding freedom of expression. Nevertheless, it drew criticism for poorly evaluated decisions, including the dissolution of the armed forces and intelligence agencies, alongside the de-Ba'athification of public sector personnel.

== Early life and education ==
Bremer was born on September 30, 1941, in Hartford, Connecticut, and attended the New Canaan Country School, Kent School, and Phillips Academy Andover. Bremer's father was president of the Christian Dior Perfumes Corporation in New York and his mother was a lecturer in art history at the University of Bridgeport.

Bremer graduated from Yale University in 1963 and went on to earn an MBA from Harvard University in 1966. He later continued his education at the Institut d'études politiques de Paris, where he earned a Certificate of Political Studies (CEP).

== Career ==
=== Foreign Service ===
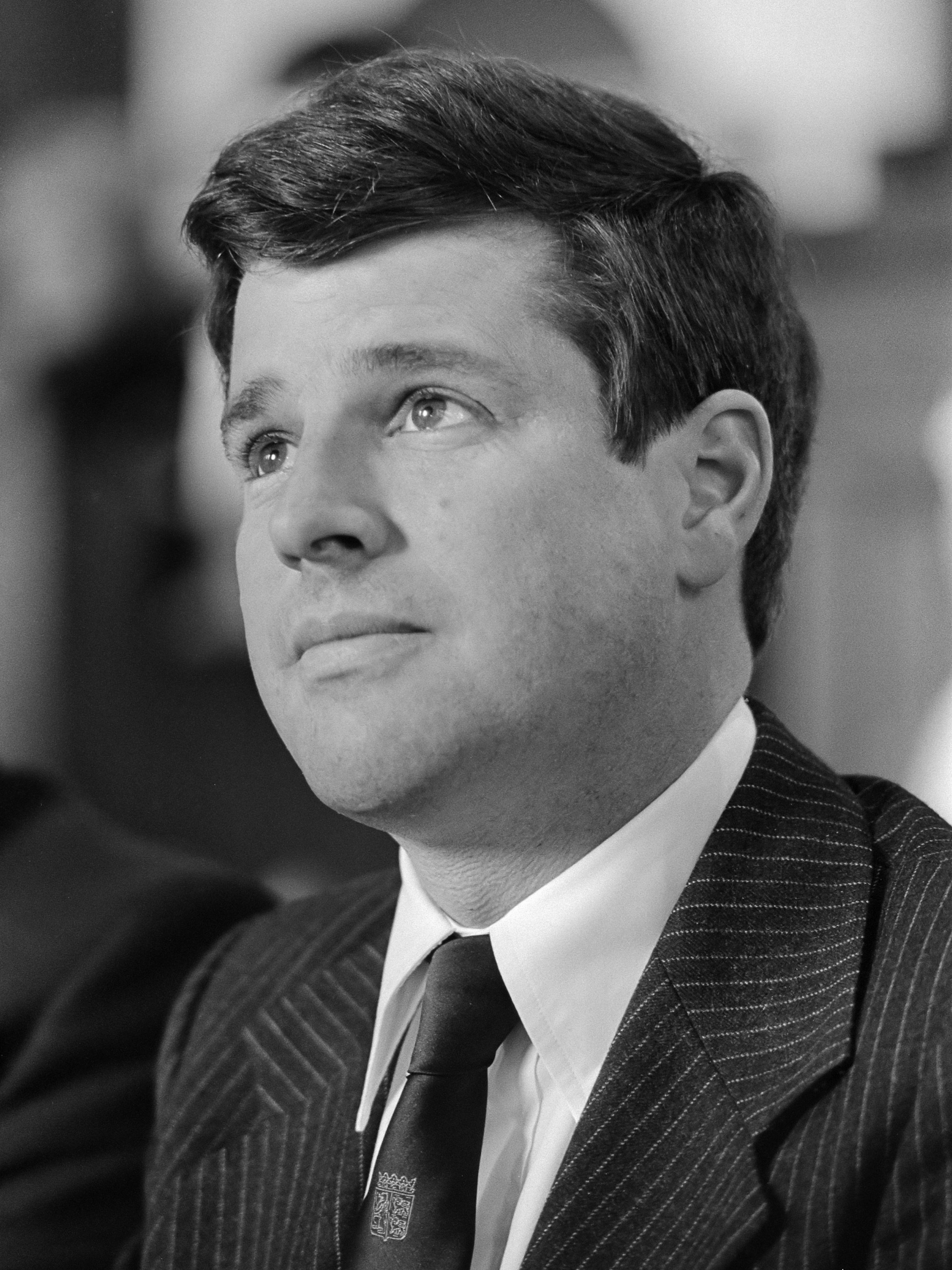
Bremer in October 1983

Bremer joined the United States Foreign Service in 1966, which sent him first to Kabul, Afghanistan, as a general services officer. He was assigned to Blantyre, Malawi, as economic and commercial officer from 1968 to 1971.

During the 1970s, Bremer held various domestic posts with the U.S. State Department, including serving as an assistant to Henry Kissinger from 1972 to 1976. He accompanied Kissinger on shuttle diplomacy missions to Israel, Syria, and Egypt to resolve the Yom Kippur War in 1973. He was Deputy Chief of Mission in Oslo, Norway, from 1976 to 1979, and returned to the United States to serve as deputy executive secretary of the Department of State from 1979 until 1981. In 1981, he was promoted to Executive Secretary of the State Department and special assistant to Alexander Haig.

Ronald Reagan appointed Bremer as ambassador to the Netherlands in 1983 and ambassador-at-large for counterterrorism and coordinator for counterterrorism in 1986.

=== Private sector ===
Bremer retired from the Foreign Service in 1989 and became managing director at Kissinger and Associates, a worldwide consulting firm founded by Henry Kissinger. A career member of the Senior Foreign Service, class of career minister, Bremer received the State Department Superior Honor Award, two Presidential Meritorious Service Awards, and the Distinguished Honor Award from the Secretary of State. Before rejoining government in 2003, he was chairman and CEO of Marsh Crisis Consulting, a risk and insurance services subsidiary of Marsh & McLennan Companies.

Bremer also served as a trustee on the Economic Club of New York, and a board member of Air Products and Chemicals, Inc., Akzo Nobel NV, the Harvard Business School Club of New York and the Netherland-America Foundation. He served on the International Advisory Boards of Komatsu Corporation and Chugai Pharmaceuticals.

Bremer and 1,700 of the employees of Marsh & McLennan had offices in the World Trade Center. Bremer's office was in the North Tower. In an interview with CNN after the September 11 attacks, he stated that their office was located "above where the second aircraft hit." On September 11, he was interviewed in Washington on WRC-TV at 12:30 pm in-studio.

Bremer and his wife are the founders of the Lincoln/Douglass Scholarship Foundation, a Washington-based nonprofit that provides high school scholarships to inner-city youths.

=== National Commission on Terrorism ===
Bremer was appointed chairman of the National Commission on Terrorism by House Speaker Dennis Hastert in 1999. The report, "Countering The Changing Threat of International Terrorism", was published in June 2000. He also served on the National Academy of Sciences' Committee on Science and Technology for Countering Terrorism, which authored a 2002 report called "Making the Nation Safer: The Role of Science and Technology in Countering Terrorism."

=== Provisional coalition administrator of Iraq ===
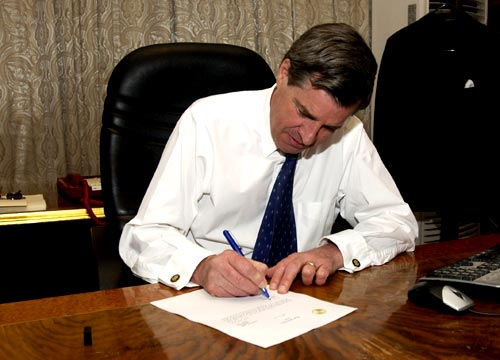
Bremer signs over limited sovereignty to the Iraqi Interim Government on June 28, 2004

Bremer was appointed by President George W. Bush as presidential envoy to Iraq on May 9, 2003. His appointment declared him subject to the "authority, direction and control" of Secretary of Defense Donald Rumsfeld.

Bremer arrived in Iraq in May 2003. On May 11 he replaced Lt. General Jay Garner as Director of the Office for Reconstruction and Humanitarian Assistance. In June, the Office was transformed into the Coalition Provisional Authority, and Bremer became the country's chief executive authority. As the holder of the "most powerful foreign post held by any American since Gen. Douglas MacArthur in Japan," he compared himself to MacArthur as well as General Lucius Clay, who was in charge of the American zone in Germany following its defeat in World War II.

As the top civilian administrator of the Coalition Provisional Authority, Bremer was permitted to rule by decree. Among his first and most notable decrees were Coalition Provisional Authority Order 1, which banned the Ba'ath party in all forms, and Coalition Provisional Authority Order 2, which dismantled the Iraqi Army.

On July 13, 2003, Bremer approved the creation of an Iraqi Interim Governing Council with the stated mission of "ensuring that the Iraqi people's interests are represented." The council members were chosen by Bremer from among groups and individuals which had supported the American invasion of Iraq. Bremer retained veto power over the council's proposals. The council was authorized to select a limited number of delegates to key Coalition Provisional Authority committees, like the Program Review Board.

Bremer also empowered the CPA to develop and implement the Iraqi constitution. The constitution became controversial when the first draft submitted by the CPA suggested banning political parties opposed to the U.S. occupation from participating in elections; privatizing much of Iraq's industries and natural resources; and allowing the unelected Iraqi Interim Governing Council to sign a binding Status of Forces Agreement between Iraq and the United States. On March 1, 2004, after several hours of negotiations, the Iraqi Interim Governing Council resolved the council members' disagreements with clauses in the constitution. A formal signing ceremony was scheduled for March 5, 2004. As the guests waited and the orchestra played, the signing was canceled due to mass demonstrations. Finally, on March 8, 2004, an interim constitution was signed. It was to be revised or replaced by a second constitution after Iraqi elections.

On June 28, 2004, at 10:26 am local time, the U.S.-led Coalition Provisional Authority formally transferred limited sovereignty of Iraqi territory to the Iraqi Interim Government, two days ahead of schedule. Bremer departed from the country on the same day. In his farewell speech, broadcast on Iraqi television, he said, "I leave Iraq gladdened by what has been accomplished and confident that your future is full of hope. A piece of my heart will always remain here in the beautiful land between the two rivers, with its fertile valleys, its majestic mountains and its wonderful people".

Bremer's office was a division of the U.S. Department of Defense, and as administrator he reported directly to the United States Secretary of Defense and the President of the United States. His senior adviser Dan Senor served as coalition spokesman, working with military spokesman Mark Kimmitt.

Bremer's role as the head of the CPA is notable for being the subject of much criticism. Large sums of money were reported to have gone missing under Bremer's leadership. Bremer's attempts at privatizing much of Iraq's infrastructure and mineral wealth were also highly criticized and the decision, apparently formulated in the office of the Secretary of Defense, to disband the Iraqi Army is widely blamed for fueling the Iraqi insurgency against the American occupation.

John Negroponte replaced Bremer as the highest-ranking American civilian in Iraq.

=== Post-Iraq career ===
After his return from Iraq, Bremer engaged in a few speaking tours. On December 14, 2004, Bremer was awarded the Presidential Medal of Freedom by President Bush, America's highest civil award for "especially meritorious contributions to the security or national interests of the United States, to world peace, or to cultural or other significant public or private endeavors." "He was also presented with the Department of Defense award for Distinguished Public Service and the Nixon Library honored him with the "Victory of Freedom Award" for "demonstrating leadership and working towards peace and freedom".

Bremer's April 18, 2005, visit to Clark University as a guest speaker led to protests against his role in the Iraq War. Dissatisfied with Bremer's speech and answers, several students also voiced disappointment at the university for having paid him $40,000. Another appearance, scheduled for the public library of his hometown, New Canaan, Connecticut, on January 18, 2006, was moved to the private St. Luke's School in the same town for fear for protests. During a February 27, 2006 public appearance at Lynchburg College, where his sister-in-law is an assistant dean, Bremer insisted that his decision to disband the Iraqi Armed Forces was the correct one.

Among other things, Bremer repeatedly asserted that when he came to Iraq, the Iraqi army had abandoned its barracks, and therefore "there was no army to disband". He also repeatedly defended his decision to expel Ba'ath Party members from government posts by comparing Saddam Hussein to Adolf Hitler.

On February 6, 2007, Bremer appeared before a congressional committee investigating fraud and abuse and was questioned about missing funds during his tenure as head of the CPA and a January 2005 audit that found $8.8 billion in unaccounted for funds.

==== Memoir ====
In 2006, Bremer published a memoir called My Year in Iraq: The Struggle to Build a Future of Hope, which was described as "an almost day-by-day narrative that sticks to what Bremer was doing and with whom he was interacting, without providing much analysis or introspection." Michiko Kakutani of The New York Times characterized it as "an amalgam of spin and sincerity, is partly an explanation (or rationalization) of actions Mr. Bremer took as America's man in Baghdad, partly an effort to issue some 'I told you so's' to administration colleagues, and partly an attempt to spread (or reassign) responsibility (or blame) by tracing just who in the White House, Pentagon and State Department signed off on or ordered critical decisions made during his tenure".

His media commentary is generally critical of the Obama administration for not devoting more effort to promoting democracy overseas. He is also a consistent advocate for continued U.S. presence in Iraq. On the other hand, while many other conservatives began advocating for a withdrawal from Afghanistan, Bremer endorsed the administration's new strategy in 2010, describing it as "reasonable" and giving Obama "credit for deciding to replicate President Bush's Iraq strategy by sending more troops to the fight in Afghanistan". He has also endorsed Samuel P. Huntington's "clash of civilizations" thesis, stating: "It is a fact of history that Europe is based on Judeo-Christian values. But Europe seems unwilling, or perhaps afraid, to acknowledge this reality."

==== Painting and writing ====
After taking art lessons at a school in Glen Echo, Maryland, in 2007, Bremer began doing oil paintings of New England country landscapes, which he sells through his company Bremer Enterprises. The proceeds of his sales are given to the historical societies of Chester and Grafton in Vermont, where he moved after his public retirement. He has self-mockingly described his style of painting as "evolving American primitive".

The Bremer Enterprises website also provides links to books by Bremer and his wife Frances Winfield Bremer. In addition to his 2006 memoir, in September 2011 Bremer published From Sea to Shining Sea: Biking Across America with Wounded Warriors, on Amazon.com's Kindle platform via Bremer Enterprises.

==== Ski instructor ====
During his time in Afghanistan, he set up the country's first ski run in the mountains outside Kabul. Bremer has worked for several seasons as a ski instructor at Okemo Mountain Resort in Vermont.

==== Board activities ====
He also engages in consulting work and serves on a number of boards. Bremer currently serves on the board of directors of BlastGard International, a Florida-based company that manufactures materials to mitigate the impact of explosions.

In November 2010, Bremer joined World T.E.A.M. Sports, a Holbrook, New York-based nonprofit, as CEO and President. Bremer also served as a member of the organization's board of directors. He retired from the organization in March 2012 and as of 2015 was listed as a 'Special Advisor'.

Bremer formerly served as a member of the board of directors of the International Republican Institute.

He received the America Award of the Italy-USA Foundation in 2013.

==== 2013 shoe throwing incident ====
In February 2013, Bremer was attending a meeting of the Henry Jackson Society at the house of commons in the United Kingdom. During a question and answer session an Iraqi man named Yasser al-Samarani said he had two messages for Bremer, one from Saddam Hussein and one from the Iraqi people and then threw both of his shoes at Bremer missing both times. Bremer after attempting to catch the second shoe thrown responded by saying "You should improve your aim if you want to do something like that," Yasser al-Samarani can be heard saying "you fucked up my country, you destroyed my country, fuck you and fuck your democracy." Al-Samarani is then escorted away and Bremer tells the room that "If he had done that while Saddam Hussein was alive, he would be a dead man by now."

==== Internet meme ====
Bremer appears in a viral internet meme, where his phrase "Ladies and gentlemen, we got him" following the capture of Saddam Hussein is used to accompany someone getting 'busted' or exposed, often with Breakbot's "Baby I'm Yours" playing in the background. After his granddaughter informed him of the trend, he was fascinated by it and hoped it would increase people's interest in Iraq's recent events.

==== Bremer's emails to his wife ====
On March 7, 2026, the Sunday Times published previously unreleased emails Bremer sent to his wife while in Iraq. In an email dated May 14, 2003, two days after he arrived in Iraq, Bremer writes to his wife that he had received his "official designation as administrator of the Coalition Provisional Authority" and declares "I am now officially the government of Iraq." In an email dated June 23, 2003, Bremer tells his wife that he cancelled a provincial election in the country because he believed the Supreme Council for the Islamic Revolution would win. In the email he dismisses the opinion of US marines who warned cancelling the election would "stoke tension" saying that “I had to land rather hard on them to explain that while I did not expect them to take my advice on driving a tank, neither would I expect them to know about delicate political matters".

In another email dated September 5, 2003, Bremer relates meeting representatives from the Yazidi population and expresses surprise at the population's existence, saying to his wife "what's that? never heard of it? Neither have I." In an email sent just over a month later dated October 7, 2003, Bremer harshly criticizes the Iraqi Governing Council, saying “The GC [Governing Council] continues to behave like a kindergarten. No discipline, no sense of responsibility, no coherence."

In an email sent on December 22nd 2003, Bremer relates having an interview with ITN reporter James Mates. In the email Bremer calls Mates "a buck toothed-snot" after Mates in his words "began whimpering about [us] not having found WMD [weapons of mass destruction] and therefore the war was not worth fighting".

In multiple emails from 2004 Bremer appears to believe that many of the Iraqis he meets aren't expressing enough gratitude to the United States for removing Saddam Hussein's regime from power, saying in one email dated March 5th 2004, that "About 40 sheikhs from Samarra came to visit me today. They were a cantankerous lot, even by Iraqi standards. Lots of complaints about unemployment, the lack of reconstruction efforts, need for more water, treatment of detainees etc. My favourite moments were when, after an hour-long litany of complaints (and never a word of thanks for liberation), one of them noted that Samarra is known throughout Iraq… for having ‘the purest heart’ of all cities. Right.” Bremer expresses similar sentiment in another email dated March 30th 2004, where he relates an exchange he had with a group of Iraqi students who he says criticized the detaining of Iraqis and questioned if the United States would really give sovereignty back to the country saying "They complained about everything under the sun...". He also says they are "entirely ungrateful" and says they "had not one word of thanks to the coalition, even for their liberation.”

Later emails show Bremer's reactions to the killing of four Blackwater contractors in Fallujah, the subsequent battle between coalition forces and insurgents in that city, the Abu Ghraib prison scandal and the mukaradeeb wedding party bombing.

== Criticism and controversies ==
=== Disbanding the Iraqi Army ===
On May 23, 2003, Bremer issued Order Number 2, in effect dissolving the entire former Iraqi army and putting 400,000 former Iraqi soldiers out of work. The move was widely criticized for creating a large pool of armed and disgruntled youths for the insurgency. Former soldiers took to the streets in mass protests to demand back pay. Many of them threatened violence if their demands were not met. Bremer was later heavily criticized for officially disbanding the former Iraqi Army. During Bremer's stay in Iraq, Osama bin Laden allegedly placed a bounty of 10,000 grams of gold on Bremer, the equivalent of US$125,000 at the time.

Despite the messages the CIA reportedly communicated to the Iraqi army and the leaflets that were dropped on Iraqi army units by coalition aircraft that read "leave now and go home", the argument was still ventured that by the time Baghdad fell on April 9, 2003, the previous Army had demobilized, or as Bremer puts it, "had simply dissolved". However, as Mark Danner reports in an essay in The New York Review of Books entitled "Iraq: The War of Imagination" from September 2006, American agents—including one colonel and a number of CIA operatives—had already begun meeting regularly with Iraqi officers in order to reconstitute the army as a working force. Implied in this is the notion that the army, temporarily "demobilized" or not, did in fact continue to exist as a coherent entity, indeed coherent enough that it could be consulted and negotiated with. This seems to concur with the position of the first Director of the Office of Reconstruction and Humanitarian Assistance (ORHA), retired U.S. Army Lieutenant General Jay Garner, who Bremer had replaced. As Bob Woodward reports in State of Denial, Garner, upon hearing of the order to disband the army, attempted to convince Bremer to rethink the dissolution. Bremer was reported as saying: "The plans have changed. The thought is we don't want the residuals of the old army. We want a new and fresh army." To this, Garner replied: "Jerry, you can get rid of an army in a day, but it takes years to build one." At one point during the conversation Bremer cut off Garner's protest against the disbanding order by stating "The president told me that de-Baathification comes before the immediate needs of the Iraqi people."

In a memo addressed to Donald Rumsfeld dated June 15, 2003, titled "should we pay the ex-military?", Bremer appears to acknowledge the negative consequences of his decision writing that "we have been studying the problems the disbanded Iraqi armed forces pose to force protection, general security, and law and order. When we dissolved the MOD and the old armed forces, we dismissed their employees. That has left some 230,000 officers and NCO's unemployed, some of whom have been protesting their not having been paid. This discontent among a respected group with training in weapons and with networks of contacts and loyalties presents a significant security threat".

The issue of disbanding the old Iraqi Army found itself, once again, the center of media attention with two articles explaining why Bremer ostensibly did not make the decision on his own. The first press release by The New York Times included a letter written by Bremer to President Bush dated May 20, 2003, describing the progress made so far since Bremer's arrival in Baghdad, including one sentence that reads "I will parallel this step with an even more robust measure dissolving Saddam's military and intelligence structures to emphasize that we mean business."

The second press release dated September 6, 2007, was submitted by Bremer as a New York Times op-ed. Titled "How I Didn't Dismantle Iraq's Army", Bremer says he did not make the decision on his own, and that the decision was reviewed by "top civilian and military members of the American government" including the then-USCENTCOM Commander, General John Abizaid, who briefed officials in Washington that there were no more "organized Iraqi military units".

Bremer's article goes into further detail about how the Coalition Provisional Authority considered two alternatives: To recall the old army or to rebuild a new army with "both vetted members of the old army and new recruits". According to Bremer, Abizaid preferred the second.

Bremer also details the situation he and the major decision makers faced; especially when the large Shiite majority in the new army could have had problems with the thought of having a former Sunni officer issuing orders.

Furthermore, a memo from U.S. Secretary of Defense Donald Rumsfeld on May 8, 2003, that said "the coalition 'will actively oppose Saddam Hussein's old enforcers—the Baath Party, Fedayeen Saddam, etc ... 'we will make clear that the coalition will eliminate the remnants of Saddam's regime'" was sent to both National Security Adviser Condoleezza Rice and Secretary of State Colin Powell.

After two protesters were killed by U.S. troops, the CPA agreed to pay up to 250,000 former soldiers a stipend of $50 to $150 a month. Conscripts were given a single severance payment. Many of the former soldiers found this to be grossly inadequate.

Charles H. Ferguson, director of critically acclaimed No End in Sight, created a video response to Bremer's op-ed on September 6, 2007. (This was the very first New York Times video op-ed in history.)

=== "De-Ba'athification" of the Iraqi civil service ===
Saddam Hussein's ruling Ba'ath Party counted among its members a majority of Iraq's governmental employees, including educational officials and some teachers, though as of 2003 members of the Ba'ath Party had constituted only around 10% of the Iraqi population. By order of the CPA, the top 1% of Iraqi Ba'ath Party members were forbidden from holding government positions, but were still permitted to open businesses and work at newspapers, and all public sector employees affiliated with the Ba'ath Party were to be removed from their positions and be banned from any future employment in the public sector. When the CPA turned over enforcement of de-Ba'athification to Iraqi politicians, however, these rules were broadly expanded and used to punish political opponents, including nearly 11,000 teachers who were dismissed from the party and removed from government—a phenomenon which Bremer worked with the then-Education Minister to fix. Critics claim these measures helped to create and worsen an atmosphere of discontent among Iraqis and that de-Ba'athification, coupled with the disbandment of the Iraqi military, if not created then at least fueled the insurgency against Coalition Forces. This policy of "de-Ba'athification" was reversed in January 2008.

Bremer was once again warned of the harm his actions would have. According to Woodward, when Garner asserted that none of the ministries would be able to function after this order, Bremer asked the Baghdad station chief for his thoughts. "If you put this out ... you will put 50,000 people on the street, underground, and mad at Americans", he replied. Woodward: "And these 50,000 were the most powerful, well-connected elites from all walks of life". Sometime after receiving this advice Bremer wrote in an email to his wife that "There was a sea of bitching and moaning but the president's guidance is clear, de-Ba'athification will be carried out even if at a cost to administrative efficiency".

=== Iraq's oil revenue ===
Bremer was accountable to the Secretary of Defense for the actions he took. But, since his authority to spend Iraq's oil revenue derived from United Nations Resolution 1483, he was also accountable to the United Nations. The authority he derived from the UN to spend Iraq's oil revenue bound him to show that:

- Expenditures were intended to benefit the Iraqi people.
- The programs that were funded were decided upon, and supervised in an open, transparent manner.
- Iraqis were invited to give meaningful input into how funds were spent.
- The administrator of Iraq was cooperating with the International Advisory and Monitoring Board (IAMB)
- That proper fiscal controls were in place, so that it could be demonstrated that none of the funds were diverted, or misspent.

One of the concerns the IAMB raised repeatedly was that the CPA had repaired the well-heads and pipelines for transporting Iraq's oil, but they had stalled on repairing the meters that were necessary to document the shipment of Iraqi oil, so it could be demonstrated that none of it was being smuggled.

On June 22, 2004, in a final press release before the CPA's authority expired, the IAMB stated:

The IAMB was also informed by the CPA that contrary to earlier representations the award of metering contracts have been delayed and continues to urge the expeditious resolution of this critical issue.

The CPA has acknowledged that the failure to meter the oil shipments resulted in some oil smuggling—an avoidable loss of Iraq's oil that was Bremer's responsibility. Neither Bremer nor any of his staff has offered an explanation for their failure to repair the meters.

=== Financial ===
==== Failure to perform month-end cash reconciliations ====
Under Bremer's stewardship the CPA requested $12 billion in cash from the U.S. Treasury. Under Bremer's stewardship the CPA paid out $12 billion in cash. The external auditors management notes point out that the CPA didn't perform a cash reconciliation until April 2004, eleven months into Bremer's mandate, when they started their work. See Congressional hearing when Ambassador Paul Bremer and Stuart Bowen, the special inspector general for Iraq Reconstruction, testified on management of U.S. funds in Iraq.

==== Failure to employ qualified internal auditors ====
In his second regulation, Bremer committed the Coalition Provisional Authority to hire a reputable firm of certified chartered accountants, to serve as internal auditors, to help make sure the Coalition's finances were administered according to modern accounting principles. These internal auditors would be separate and distinct from the external auditors who would report to the International Advisory and Monitoring Board. Bremer did not make sure the CPA hired internal auditors, however.

When the external auditors arrived, they learned that Bremer had not made sure the CPA lived up to the commitment to hire internal auditors to help set up a reliable accounting system. On the contrary they learned that a single contracted consultant kept track of the CPA's expenditures in a series of spreadsheets.

The external auditors reported that rather than use a modern double entry accounting system the CPA used what they described as "a single-entry, cash-based transaction list".

==== Unaccounted-for funds ====
On January 30, 2005, an official report by Special Inspector General for Iraq Reconstruction Stuart Bowen cited by Time stated that $9 billion for the reconstruction of Iraq might have disappeared in fraud, corruption, and other misbehavior. On one particular salary register, only 602 names among 8,206 could be verified. As another cited example, the Coalition Authority authorized Iraqi officials to postpone declaring the reception of $2.5 billion, which the provisional government had received in spring through the Oil for Food program.

Bremer wrote an eight-page reply to deny the accusations and stated that, during the IG's inquiry, Bowen's people refused to interview Bremer's deputies, and the IG's report failed to mention that Bremer and his people worked under extraordinary conditions, faced a high turnover rate, and had insufficient number of personnel to carry out their rebuilding and humanitarian relief efforts.

Bremer's claim that Bowen's staff made no attempt to interview his staff is at odds with the detailed account of the external auditors, of their attempts to meet with Bremer and his staff. In their management notes they describe how some of the CPA's senior staff, including Bremer himself, just would not make themselves available to meet with the auditors. Others, like George Wolfe, the CPA's de facto treasurer, showed a total lack of cooperation.

This issue also became a topic of discussion during some of Bremer's Q&A sessions with students who attended Bremer's presentations during Bremer's campus speaking tours. Some questioned Bremer if he could have done things differently in Iraq, but were notably disappointed when he avoided the question. Bremer allegedly responded to one such question with, "I will tell you what I told them, I'm saving that for my book ... I need more time to reflect".

=== Shutting down the newspaper Al-Hawza ===
On March 28, 2004, Bremer ordered the 759th Military Police Battalion to shut down Iraqi newspaper al-Hawza for two months. This move was widely criticized as running directly counter to the Bush administration's announced goal of helping transform Iraq into a modern, democratic state. This move was even criticized by members of Bremer's own appointees on the Iraqi Governing Council.

Al-Hawza started after the removal of Saddam Hussein and was considered a mouthpiece for Shi'ite cleric Muqtada al-Sadr. It was shut down by the United States-led administration headed by Bremer on March 28, 2004, after being accused of encouraging violence against Coalition troops. There was discussion with Sir Jeremy Greenstock (UK's Special Representative for Iraq), about preparations to arrest al-Sadr, who by early March 2004 had increased his militia following, the Mahdi army, from about 200 followers to some 6,000, in seven months. Bremer wrote in his book that "Greenstock said that this would be a difficult time to go after him ... I first urged [his] arrest last August".

Iyad Allawi, leader of the interim government, explicitly gave al-Hawza permission to re-open on July 18, 2004.

=== Granting foreign contractors immunity from Iraqi law ===
Two days before he left Iraq, Bremer signed Coalition Provisional Authority Order 17, which gave everyone associated with the CPA and the American government immunity from Iraqi law. One of his former top aides is quoted as saying that Bremer "wanted to make sure our military, civilians and contractors were protected from Iraqi law." This stipulation was later incorporated into Iraqi law.

Since then, violent events in Iraq involving American security companies such as Blackwater have triggered great resentment among Iraqi citizens, who view them as private armies acting with impunity.

=== Early departure ===
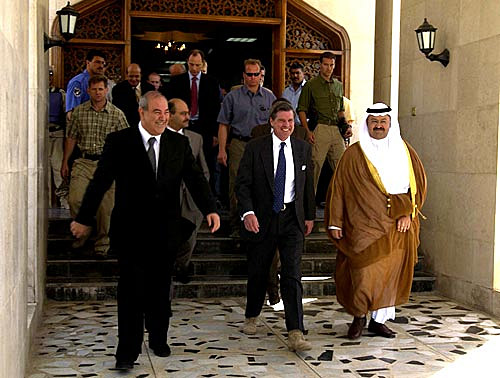
Iraqi Prime Minister Ayad Allawi (left), Bremer, and President Sheikh Ghazi Mashal Ajil al-Yawer following a ceremony celebrating the transfer of full governmental authority to the Iraqi Interim Government on June 28, 2004

Bremer's early departure was a complete surprise. But the turnover of political power a couple of days earlier was suggested by members of the Bush administration to thwart any plans the insurgency may have had for June 30.

U.S. intelligence sources had monitored chatter that suggested resistance elements were planning demonstrations, or outright attacks, to coincide with the time of the official handover. An early handover would preempt the plans of resistance elements.

His early departure was disruptive to the smooth transition of authority, as the KPMG audit of the Development Fund for Iraq made clear. In their management notes the external auditors describe trying to meet with Bremer, and being very surprised by his early departure.

Many of Bremer's senior staff left when he did, meaning that important documents required for the completion of the audit could not be signed by the appropriate staff members.

Former Speaker of the House Newt Gingrich called Bremer "the largest single disaster in American foreign policy in modern times," stating that he should have been relieved of his duties "no later than" September 2003.

In a poll conducted in Iraq in April 2004, two months before Bremer left the country permanently, thirty-one percent of Iraqis surveyed held a favorable view of him while forty-two percent held an unfavorable view.

Diplomatic posts
Preceded by William Dyess	United States Ambassador to the Netherlands; 1983–1986	Succeeded by John Shad
Preceded by Robert Oakley	Coordinator for Counterterrorism; 1986–1989	Succeeded by Morris Busby
Political offices
Preceded by Jay Garner as Director of the Office for Reconstruction and Humanitarian Assistance of Iraq	Administrator of the Coalition Provisional Authority of Iraq; 2003–2004	Succeeded by Ghazi Mashal Ajil al-Yawer as Acting President of Iraq
