= Jay Garner =

United States Army general and United States Marine

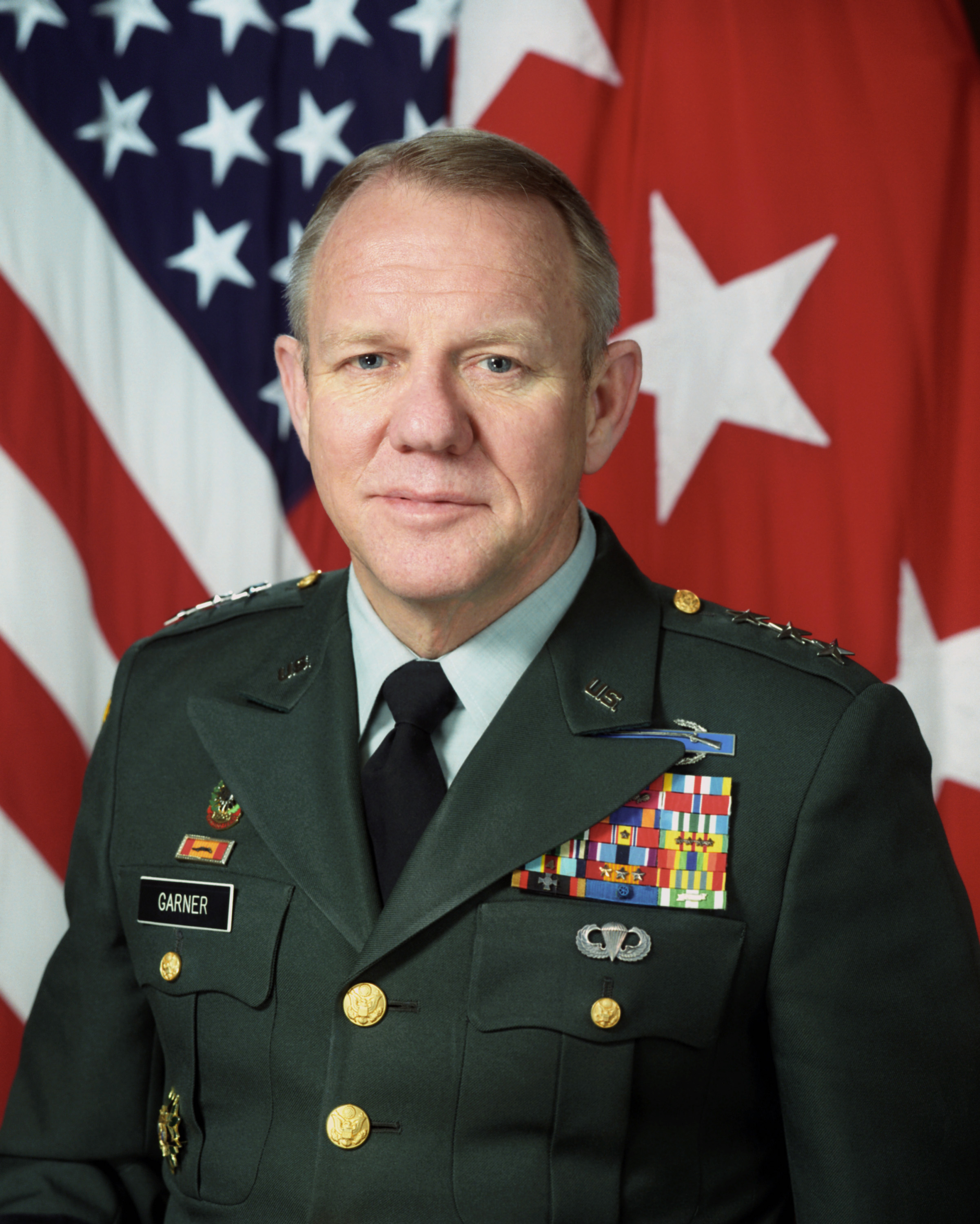
- Garner in 1996

Director of the Office for Reconstruction and Humanitarian Assistance of Iraq
- In office April 21, 2003 – May 12, 2003
- President: George W. Bush
- Preceded by: Saddam Hussein (President & Prime Minister of Iraq)
- Succeeded by: Paul Bremer (Administrator of Coalition Provisional Authority)

Personal details
- Born: Jay Montgomery Garner; April 15, 1938 (age 88) Arcadia, Florida, U.S.
- Party: Democrat
- Education: Florida State University (BA); Shippensburg University (MPA)

Military service
- Branch: United States Army
- Service years: 1962–1997
- Rank: Lieutenant General
- Commands: United States Army Space and Missile Defense Command; Joint Task Force Bravo; 108th Brigade, 32nd Artillery
- Conflicts: Vietnam War; Gulf War
- Awards: Army Distinguished Service Medal (2); Defense Superior Service Medal (2); Legion of Merit (5); Bronze Star

Jay Montgomery Garner (born April 15, 1938) is a retired United States Army lieutenant general who in 2003 was appointed as Director of the Office for Reconstruction and Humanitarian Assistance for Iraq following the 2003 invasion of Iraq, making him the immediate replacement of Saddam Hussein as the de facto chief civilian administrator of Iraq. Garner was soon replaced by Ambassador Paul Bremer and the ambassador's successor organization to ORHA, the Coalition Provisional Authority (CPA).

== Early life and education ==
Born in Arcadia, Florida, Garner served an enlistment in the United States Marine Corps before attending the Florida State University, where he received a Bachelor of Arts degree in History in 1962. He also holds a master's in public administration from Shippensburg State University.

== Military career ==
Commissioned as an army second lieutenant in 1962, Garner served two tours in Vietnam, and later led two air defense units in Germany. He also served as deputy commanding general at Fort Bliss, Texas. Garner helped to develop the Patriot missile system and commanded missile batteries during the Gulf War. After the war he was put in charge of securing Kurdish areas in northern Iraq. He was later named commander of the United States Army Space and Strategic Defense Command (working primarily on President Reagan's Strategic Defense Initiative missile shield program), and concluded his army career as Assistant Vice Chief of Staff, retiring in 1997 at the rank of lieutenant general.

After leaving the army, Garner became president of SYColeman, a defense contractor which designs missile communications and targeting systems used in the Patriot and Arrow missile systems. The company was acquired by L3Harris where Garner remained for two years before retiring. Garner served on a presidential panel, chaired by Donald Rumsfeld, which specializes in space and missile threats. He has also worked closely with the Israel Defense Forces.

== Involvement in the Iraq War ==
In 2003 Garner was selected to lead the post-war reconstruction efforts in Iraq, along with three deputies, including British Major-General Tim Cross. Garner was regarded as a natural choice by the Bush administration given his earlier similar role in the north. General Garner was to develop and implement plans to assist the Iraqis in developing governance and reconstructing the country once Saddam Hussein was deposed.

Following the defeat of the Saddam Hussein regime in Baghdad, there was widespread looting, rampaging, and general chaos throughout Iraq. Some of the most important monuments, such as the national museum, were under attack. Furthermore, the infrastructure of the country was in ruins, ministries were broken into, and government records were destroyed. The situation in Iraq became chaotic and anarchic. The only ministry which was protected by the occupying forces was the oil ministry. In addition, many exiled leaders from Iran and some from the West returned to Iraq. The Bush administration selected Lieutenant General Jay Garner to lead the Coalition Provisional Authority (an intermediary government) in an attempt to rid Iraq of the chaos and anarchy that consumed the area. Garner's plan was to choose government officials from the former Iraqi regime to help lead the country.

Garner began reconstruction efforts in March 2003 with plans aiming for Iraqis to hold elections within 90 days and for the U.S. to quickly pull troops out of the cities to a desert base. Jalal Talabani, a member of Jay Garner's staff in Kuwait before the war, was consulted on several occasions to help the U.S. select a liberal Iraqi government; this would be the first liberal government to exist in Iraq. In an interview with Time magazine, Garner stated that "as in any totalitarian regime, there were many people who needed to join the Baath Party in order to get ahead in their careers. We don't have a problem with most of them. But we do have a problem with those who were part of the thug mechanism under Saddam. Once the U.S. identifies those in the second group, we will get rid of them." On April 15, 2003, General Garner called a conference in the city of Nasiriyah, where Garner, along with 100 Iraqis, discussed the future of Iraq. Garner called a follow-up meeting on April 28, 2003. 250 Iraqis attended this meeting, and five of these Iraqis were selected by Garner's administration as the core leaders of the new Iraqi government: Masood Barzani was appointed as head of the Kurdistan Democratic Party, Talabani as head of the rival Patriotic Union of Kurdistan, Abdul Aziz Al Hakim was appointed as the leader of the Supreme Assembly for Islamic Revolution in Iraq, Ahmad Chalabi was chosen to represent the Iraqi National Congress and Iyad Allawi was appointed as the leader of the Iraqi National Accord. Garner's selection caused quite a stir amongst many Iraqis. Although many Iraqis were open to the change that Garner and the U.S. were bringing to Iraq, others were resentful. Iraqis with a Shi'a background felt underrepresented in Garner's selection for government. Three of the five officials appointed as key members in Iraq's new government were of Sunni background, one official was from a mixed Sunni–Shi'a background, and only one of the officials was of pure Shi'a background. The Shi'a felt left out and underrepresented, considering they comprise over 60% of the Iraqi population. Furthermore, many Iraqis felt this new government was not selected in a democratic manner, as the U.S. had promised.

Once the leaders were selected, a plan to hold elections in Iraq, where members would be selected, began on May 6, 2003, and ended on November 14, 2003, when the plan was abandoned. General Garner would be replaced by a new American Ambassador to Iraq, Paul Bremer, who took his role as head of the Coalition Provisional Authority. Following Garner's dismissal, it was planned that an Iraq government would take power in June 2004. Iyad Allawi was designated to lead the Iraqi interim authority. Allawi was a former Baathist of Shi'a origin. Allawi had many credentials, including previous work experience with the CIA.

When Garner was replaced in his role by Paul Bremer on May 11, 2003, there was quite a bit of speculation as to why he was replaced so abruptly. It has been suggested that Garner was moved aside because he did not agree with the White House about who should decide how to reconstruct Iraq. He wanted early elections—90 days after the fall of Baghdad—and the new government to decide how to run the country and what to do with its assets. Garner said "I don't think [Iraqis] need to go by the U.S. plan, I think that what we need to do is set an Iraqi government that represents the freely elected will of the people. It's their country ... their oil." Some experts faulted Garner for prioritizing elections over improving and privatizing the Iraqi economy.

Garner was interviewed in No End in Sight, a 2007 documentary movie very critical of the handling of the Iraq occupation.

Political offices
Preceded by Saddam Hussein as President of Iraq	Director of the Office for Reconstruction and Humanitarian Assistance of Iraq; 2003	Succeeded by Paul Bremer as Administrator of the Coalition Provisional Authority of Iraq
