= List of ambassadors of the United States to Iraq =

Ambassador of the United States to Iraq
- سفارة الولايات المتحدة في جمهورية العراق
- Seal of the United States Department of State

- Flag of a United States ambassador

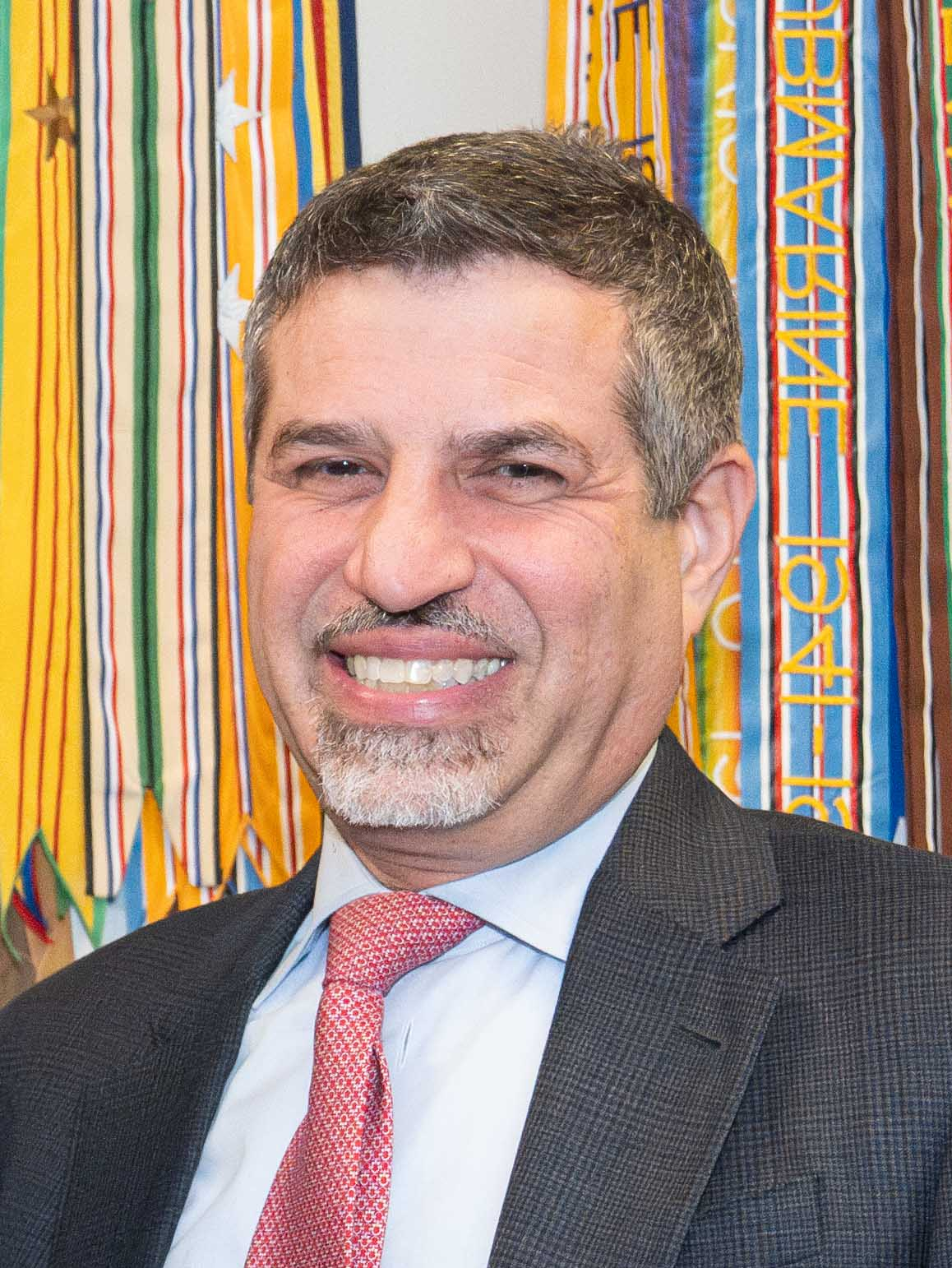
- Incumbent; Steven Fagin; Chargé d'affaires since September 2, 2026
- Nominator: The president of the United States
- Appointer: The president; with Senate advice and consent
- Inaugural holder: Alexander K. Sloan as Chargé d'Affaires
- Formation: 1931
- Website: U.S. Embassy – Baghdad

This is a list of all official heads of diplomatic missions of the United states to the modern state of Iraq.

The two countries have had official diplomatic relations since 1931, with the exception of two separate periods during which these relations were severed; namely in 1967 and 1991. The embassy of the United States in Iraq was established in 28 December 1946.

== List ==
The following list includes ambassadors and lower-ranking chargés d'affaires.

- Alexander K. Sloan (1931), chargé d'affaires
- Paul Knabenshue (1932–1942), minister
- Thomas M. Wilson (1942), minister
- Loy W. Henderson (1943–1945), minister
- George Wadsworth II (1946–1948), minister
- Edward Savage Crocker II (1948), first ambassador
- Burton Y. Berry (1952–1954)
- Waldemar J. Gallman (1954–1958)
- John D. Jernegan (1958–1962)
- Robert C. Strong (1963–1967)
- Enoch S. Duncan (1967), chargé d'affaires

The United States broke off full ties with Iraq over the Six-Day War and did not resume them until 1984. The U.S. maintained an interests section starting in 1972, hosted by the Belgian embassy.

- David George Newton (1984–1988), initially chargé d'affaires, then full ambassador
- April Glaspie (1988–1990)
- Joseph C. Wilson (1990–1991), chargé d'affaires until First Gulf War

Diplomatic relations were again severed due to the Gulf War. The American embassy in Baghdad remained closed until 2000 when it was staffed by Japanese diplomats working in proxy with the U.S. No new ambassador or chargé d'affaires was appointed until after the Second Gulf War. However the U.S. interests section was opened at the Polish embassy in January 1991. The Polish embassy represented the interests of the U.S. until July 13, 2004.

- Jan Wojciech Piekarski (1991–1995), the director of the U.S. interests section at the Polish embassy in Baghdad, Polish diplomat
- Krzysztof Biernacki (?–2004), the director of the U.S. interests section at the Polish embassy in Baghdad, Polish diplomat
- John Negroponte (July 2004—March 2005), first post–Second Gulf War ambassador
- Zalmay Khalilzad (June 2005–March 2007)
- Ryan Crocker (March 2007–February 2009), ambassador Patricia A. Butenis was chargé d'Affaires, a.i.
- Christopher R. Hill (April 2009–August 2010)
- James F. Jeffrey (August 2010–June 2012)
- Robert S. Beecroft (October 2012–September 2014)
- Stuart E. Jones (October 2014–September 2016)
- Douglas Silliman (September 2016–February 2019)
- Joey R. Hood (February–June 2019), chargé d'affaires
- Matthew H. Tueller (June 2019–June 2022)
- Alina L. Romanowski (June 2022–December 2024)
- Elizabeth Kennedy Trudeau (December 2024–January 2025), chargé d'affaires
- Daniel Rubinstein (January–May 2025), chargé d'affaires
- Steven Fagin (May–September 2025), chargé d'affaires
- Joshua Harris (September 2025–September 2026), chargé d'affaires
- Steven Fagin (since September 2026), chargé d'affaires

== See also ==
- Embassy of Iraq, Washington, D.C.
- Embassy of the United States, Baghdad
- Iraq–United States relations
- Foreign relations of Iraq
- Ambassadors of the United States
