= Matthew Tueller =

American diplomat (born 1957)

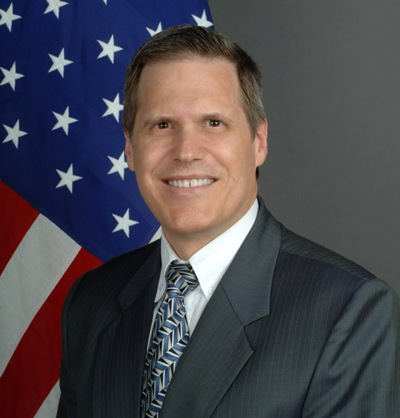
- Official portrait, 2011

United States Ambassador to Iraq
- In office June 9, 2019 – June 2, 2022
- President: Donald Trump; Joe Biden
- Preceded by: Douglas Silliman
- Succeeded by: Alina Romanowski

United States Ambassador to Yemen
- In office May 27, 2014 – May 16, 2019
- President: Barack Obama; Donald Trump
- Preceded by: Gerald M. Feierstein
- Succeeded by: Christopher Henzel

United States Ambassador to Kuwait
- In office September 28, 2011 – April 28, 2014
- President: Barack Obama
- Preceded by: Deborah K. Jones
- Succeeded by: Douglas Silliman

Personal details
- Born: Matthew Heywood Tueller; 1957 (age 68–69) Utah, U.S.
- Spouse: DeNeece Gurney
- Children: 5
- Education: Brigham Young University (BA); Harvard University (MPP)
- Matthew Tueller's voice Tueller's opening statement at his confirmation hearing to be United States ambassador to Iraq; Recorded March 6, 2019

Matthew Heywood Tueller (born 1957) is an American diplomat who formerly served as the United States Ambassador to Iraq. A career United States Foreign Service officer, he served as the United States Ambassador to Kuwait and Yemen as well.

== Early life and education ==
Tueller was born in Utah. His father, Blaine Carlson Tueller, was Foreign Service officer, and as a result, Tueller grew up in Europe, North Africa, and Latin America, including four years in Tangier, Morocco, where he learned Arabic.

Tueller earned a Bachelor of Arts degree from Brigham Young University and a Master of Public Policy from the Harvard Kennedy School.

== Career ==
=== Early career ===
Matthew Tueller is a career member of the Senior Foreign Service and his other overseas assignments have included Deputy Chief of Mission at Embassy Cairo; Political Minister Counselor at Embassy Baghdad; Deputy Chief of Mission at Embassy Kuwait; Political Counselor at Embassy Riyadh; Chief of the U.S. Office in Aden, Yemen; Deputy Chief of Mission at Embassy Doha; Political Officer at Embassy London; and Political Officer and Consular Officer at Embassy Amman. His Washington assignments have included Deputy Director in the Office of Northern Gulf Affairs and Egypt Desk Officer.

=== Ambassador to Kuwait ===
Tueller arrived in Kuwait on September 23, 2011. He was nominated as the U.S. Ambassador to Kuwait by President Barack Obama on May 4, 2011. His nomination was confirmed by the U.S. Senate on June 30, 2011, and he was sworn in by Deputy Secretary of State William J. Burns on September 8.

=== Ambassador to Yemen ===
Tueller was the United States Ambassador to Yemen from 2014 to 2019.

He has been involved in negotiations between Yemen's Houthi forces and partners of the Saudi-led coalition during the course of the present civil war. His impartiality has been questioned by both Houthi negotiators and others within the State Department, leading to criticism over the United States' role in the prolonged state of the conflict and the resulting humanitarian crisis.

=== Ambassador to Iraq ===
On November 7, 2018, the White House announced the president's intent to nominate Ambassador Matthew H. Tueller to be the next United States Ambassador to Iraq. On May 16, 2019, the United States Senate confirmed the nomination of Tueller to be United States Ambassador to the Republic of Iraq.

== Personal life ==
Tueller is married to DeNeece Gurney and has five children. He is an active member of the Church of Jesus Christ of Latter-day Saints, having served a two-year mission in Spain. He speaks multiple dialects of Arabic.

== See also ==
- List of ambassadors appointed by Donald Trump

Diplomatic posts
Preceded by Deborah K. Jones	United States Ambassador to Kuwait; 2011–2014	Succeeded by Michael J. Adler as Chargé d'affaires
Preceded by Deborah K. Jones	United States Ambassador to Kuwait; 2011–2014	Succeeded by Douglas Silliman
Preceded by Gerald M. Feierstein	United States Ambassador to Yemen; 2014–2019	Succeeded by Christopher Henzel
Preceded by Douglas Silliman	United States Ambassador to Iraq; 2019–2022	Succeeded by Alina Romanowski
Preceded by Joey R. Hood as Chargé d'affaires	United States Ambassador to Iraq; 2019–2022	Succeeded by Alina Romanowski
