= Abu Nuwas =

8th-century classical Arabic poet

- أبو نواس
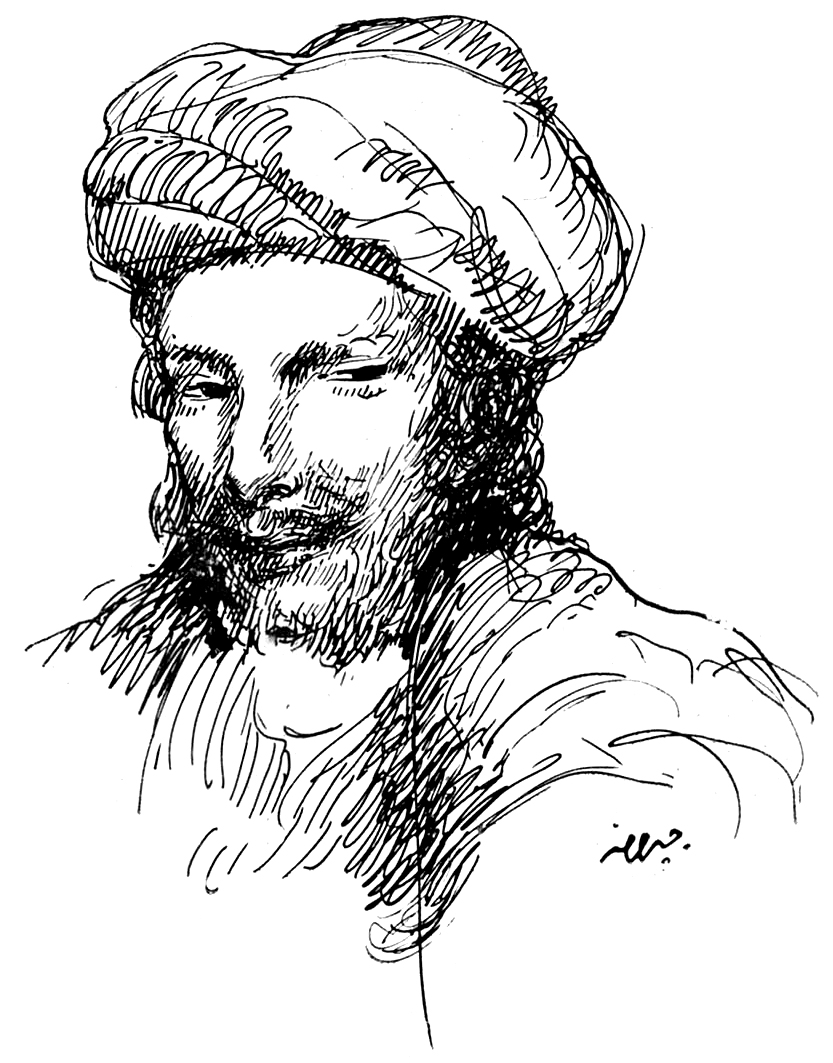
- Abu Nuwas drawn by Khalil Gibran in 1916
- Born: Abū Nuwās al-Ḥasan ibn Hānī al-Ḥakamī; 756-8; Ahvaz, Abbasid Caliphate
- Died: c. 814 (aged 57–58); Baghdad, Abbasid Caliphate
- Occupation: Poet
- Writing career
- Language: Arabic

Abu Nuwas (أبو نواس, Abū Nuwās) (Note: Full name: Al-Ḥasan ibn Hānī 'Abd al-Awal al-Ṣabāḥ, Abū 'Alī (أَبُو عَلِي اَلْحَسَنْ بْنْ هَانِئْ بْنْ عَبْدِ اَلْأَوَّلْ بْنْ اَلصَّبَاحِ اَلْحُكْمِيِّ اَلْمِذْحَجِي), also known as Abū Nuwās al-Salamī (أبو نواس السلمي)) (756-8 – c. 814) was a classical Arabic poet, and the foremost representative of the modern (muhdath) poetry that developed during the first years of the Abbasid Caliphate. He also entered the folkloric tradition, appearing several times in One Thousand and One Nights.

Of mixed Arab and Persian heritage, he studied in Basra and al-Kufah, first under the poet Waliba ibn al-Hubab, and later under Khalaf al-Ahmar. He also studied the Qur'an, Hadith, and grammar. He earned the favour of the Abbasid caliphs Harun ar-Rashid and al-Amin. He is best known for his wine poetry, and Diwan, his collected volume of poetry that explored religion, pleasure, and homoeroticism.

== Early life ==
Abu Nuwas was born in the province of Ahvaz (modern Khuzestan Province in Iran) of the Abbasid Caliphate, either in the city of Ahvaz or one of its adjacent districts. His date of birth is uncertain, he was born sometime between 756 and 758. His father was Hani, an Arab (likely from Damascus) who had served in the army of the last Umayyad caliph Marwan II (r. 744–750). His mother was a Persian named Gulban, whom Hani had met whilst serving in the police force of Ahvaz. When Abu Nuwas was 10 years old, his father died.

In his early childhood Abu Nuwas followed his mother to Basra in lower Iraq where he attended Qur’an school and became a Hafiz at a young age. His youthful good looks and innate charisma attracted the attention of the Kufan poet, Abu Usama Waliba ibn al-Hubab al-Asadi, who took Abu Nuwas to Kufa as a young apprentice. Waliba recognized in Abu Nuwas his talent as a poet and encouraged him toward this vocation, but was also attracted sexually to the young man and may have had erotic relations with him. Abu Nuwas's relationships with adolescent boys when he had matured as a man seem to mirror his own experience with Waliba.

== Work ==
Abu Nuwas wrote poetry in multiple genres; his great talent was most recognized in his wine poems and in his hunting poems. Abu Nuwas’s diwan, his poetry collection, was divided by genre: panegyric poems, elegies, invective, courtly love poems on men and women, poems of penitence, hunting poems, and wine poems. His erotic lyric poetry, which is mostly homoerotic, is known from over 500 poems and fragments. He also participated in the well-established Arabic tradition of satirical poetry, which included duels between poets involving vicious exchanges of poetic lampoons and insults. Ismail bin Nubakht, one of Abu Nuwas's contemporaries, said:

"I never saw a man of more extensive learning than Abu Nuwas, nor one who, with a memory so richly furnished, possessed so few books. After his death we searched his house, and could only find one book-cover containing a quire of paper, in which was a collection of rare expressions and grammatical observations."

=== Khamriyyat (Wine Poems) ===
The spirit of a new age was reflected in wine poetry after the change in dynasties to the Abbasids. Abu Nuwas was a major influence on the development of wine poetry. His poems were likely written to entertain the Baghdad elite. The centerpiece of wine poetry lays the vivid description of the wine, exalted descriptions of its taste, appearance, fragrance, and effects on the body and mind. Abu Nuwas draws on many philosophical ideas and imagery in his poetry that glorify the Persians and mock Arab classicism. He used wine poetry as a medium to echo the themes of Abbasid relevance in the Islamic world. An example of this is shown through a piece he wrote in his Khamriyyat:

“Wine is passed round among us in a silver jug, adorned by a Persian craftsman with a variety of designs, Chosroes on its base, and round its side oryxes which horsemen hunt with bows. Wine’s place is where tunics are buttoned; water’s place is where the Persian cap (qalansuwah) is worn.”

This passage has a prevalence of Persian imagery corresponding to the Persian language used in this period. Abu Nuwas was known to have both a poetic and political tone in his poetry. Along with other Abbasid poets, Abu Nuwas atones for his openness to drinking wine and disregarding religion. He wrote satirical strikes at Islam using wine as both an excuse and liberator. A specific line of poetry in his Khamriyyat exemplifies his facetious relationship with religion; this line compares the religious prohibition of wine to God’s forgiveness. Abu Nuwas wrote his literature as if his sins were vindicated within a religious framework. Abu Nuwas’s poetry also reflected his love for wine and sexuality. The poems were written to celebrate both the physical and metaphysical experience of drinking wine that did not conform to the norms of poetry in the Islamic world. A continuing theme in Abbasid wine poetry was its affiliation with pederasty due to the fact that wine shops usually employed boys as servers. These poems were often salacious and rebellious. In the erotic section of his Diwan, his poems describe young servant girls dressed up as young boys drinking wine. His affection for young boys was displayed through his poetry and social life. Abu Nuwas explores an intriguing prejudice: that homosexuality was imported to Abbasid Iraq from the province in which the revolution originated. He states in his writing that during the Umayyad caliphate, poets only indulged in female lovers. Abu Nuwas' seductive poems use wine as a central theme for blame and scapegoat. This is shown through an excerpt from his al-Muharramah:

"Boasting myriad colors when it spreads out in glass, silencing all tongues,

Showing off her body, golden, like a peal on a tailor's strong, in the hand of a lithe young man who speaks beautifully in response to a lover's request,

With a curl on each temple and a look in his eye that spells disaster.

He is a Christian, he wears clothes from Khurasan and his tunic bares his upper chest and neck.

Were you to speak to this elegant beauty, you would fling Islam from the top of a tall mountain.

If I were not afraid of the depredation of He who leads all sinners into transgression,

I would convert to his religion, entering it knowingly with love,

For I know that the Lord would not have distinguished this youth so unless his was the true religion."

This poem accounts for various sins of Abu Nuwas: being served by a Christian, glorifying a boy's beauty, and finding testimony in Christianity. Abu Nuwas's writing ridicules heterosexual propriety, the condemnation of homosexuality, the alcohol ban, and Islam itself. He uses his literature to testify against the religious and cultural norms during the Abbasid caliphate. Though many of his poems describe his affection for boys, relating the taste and pleasure of wine to women is a signature technique of Abu Nuwas. Abu Nuwas's preference was not uncommon among men of his time as homoerotic lyrics and poetry were popular among Muslim mystics.

The earliest anthologies of his poetry and his biography were produced by:

- Yaḥyā ibn al-Faḍl and Ya‘qūb ibn al-Sikkīt arranged his poetry under ten subject categories, rather than in alphabetical order. Al-Sikkīt wrote an 800-page commentary.
- Abū Sa’īd al-Sukkarī (Note: Abū Sa’īd al-Ḥasan ibn al-Ḥusayn al-Sukkarī (d. 888/ 889), scholar of linguistics, ancient history, genealogy, poetry, geology, zoology and botany.) edited his poetry, providing commentary and linguistic notes; he completed editing approximately two thirds of the corpus of one thousand folios.
- Abū Bakr ibn Yaḥyā aI-Ṣūlī edited his work, organizing poems alphabetically, and corrected some false attributions.
- Ḥamza ibn al-Ḥasan al-Iṣfahānī also edited his writings, compiling works alphabetically. However, Ibn al-Nadim attributes this to an ‘Alī ibn Ḥamza al-Iṣbahānī.
- Yūsuf ibn al-Dāyah
- Abū Hiffān (Note: Abū Hiffān Abd Allāh ibn Aḥmad ibn Ḥarb al-Mihzamī (d. 871), secretary and poet of al-Baṣrah who lived in Baghdād.)
- Ibn al-Washshā’ Abū Ṭayyib, scholar of Baghdād
- Ibn ‘Ammār (Note: Ibn ‘Ammār is possibly Aḥmad ibn ‘Ubayd Allāh Muḥammad ibn ‘Ammār al-Thaqafī (d. 926), Shī’ah secretary and vizier to many caliphs.) wrote a critique of Abu Nuwas's work, including citing instances of alleged plagiarism.
- Al-Munajjim family: Abū Manṣūr; Yaḥyā ibn Abī Manṣūr; Muḥammad ibn Yaḥyā; ‘Alī ibn Yaḥyā; Yaḥyā ibn ‘Alī; Aḥmad ibn Yaḥyā; Hārūn ibn ‘Alī; ‘Alī ibn Hārūn; Aḥmad ibn ‘Alī; Hārūn ibn ‘Alī ibn Hārūn.
- Abū al-Ḥasan al-Sumaysāṭī also wrote in praise of Abu Nuwas.

== Imprisonment and death ==
He died during the Great Abbasid Civil War before al-Ma’mūn advanced from Khurāsān in either 199 or 200 AH (814–816 AD). Because he frequently indulged in drunken exploits, Abu Nuwas was imprisoned during the reign of Al-Amin, shortly before his death.

The cause of his death is disputed: four different accounts of Abu Nuwas’s death survive: 1. He was poisoned by the Nawbakht family, having been framed with a poem satirizing them; 2. He died in a tavern drinking right up to his death; 3. He was beaten by the Nawbakht for the satire falsely attributed to him; wine appears to have had a role in the flailing emotions of his final hours—this seems to be a combination of accounts one and two; 4. He died in prison, a version which contradicts the many anecdotes stating that in the advent of his death he suffered illness and was visited by friends (though not in prison). He most probably died of ill health, and equally probably in the house of the Nawbakht family, whence came the myth that they poisoned him. Abu Nuwas was buried in Shunizi cemetery in Baghdad.

== Legacy ==
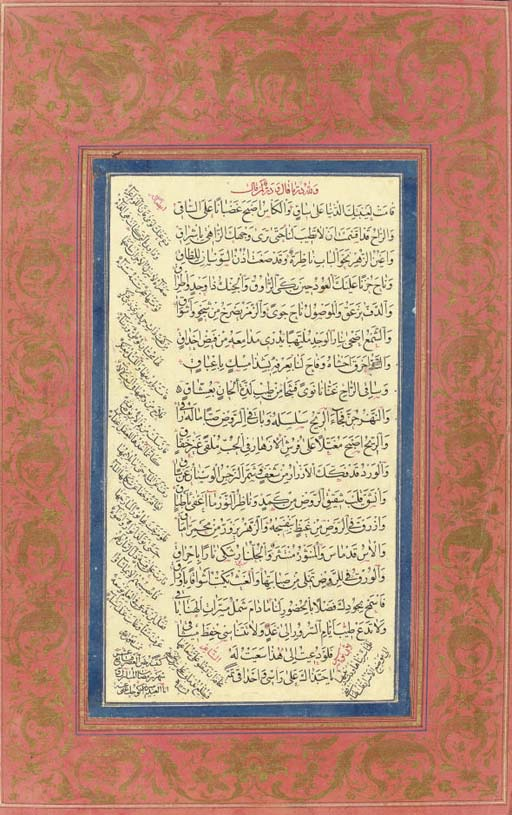
Manuscript of Abu Nawas's verses. Copied by Mirza Kuchik Visal, Qajar Iran, dated 10 May 1824

=== Influences ===
Abu Nuwas is one of a number of writers credited with inventing the literary form of the mu‘ammā (literally "blinded" or "obscured"), a riddle which is solved "by combining the constituent letters of the word or name to be found". He also perfected two Arabic genres: Khamriyya (wine poetry) and Tardiyya (hunting poetry). Ibn Quzman, who was writing in Al-Andalus in the 12th century, admired him deeply and has been compared to him.

=== Commemoration ===
The city of Baghdad has several places named for the poet. Abū Nuwās Street runs along the east bank of the Tigris River, in a neighbourhood that was once the city's showpiece. Abu Nuwas Park is located on the 2.5-kilometer stretch between the Jumhouriya Bridge and a park that extends out to the river in Karada near the 14th of July Bridge.

In 1976, a crater on the planet Mercury was named in honor of Abu Nuwas.

The Abu Nawas Association, founded in 2007 in Algeria, was named after the poet. The primary aim of the organisation is to decriminalise homosexuality in Algeria, seeking the abolition of article 333 and 338 of the Algerian penal code which still considers homosexuality a crime punishable by imprisonment and accompanied by a fine.

== Censorship ==
While his works were in circulation freely until the early years of the twentieth century, the first modern censored edition of his works was published in Cairo in 1932. In January 2001, the Egyptian Ministry of Culture ordered the burning of some 6,000 copies of books of Abu Nuwas's homoerotic poetry. In the Saudi Global Arabic Encyclopedia entry for Abu Nuwas, all mentions of pederasty were omitted.

== In popular culture ==
He features as a character in a number of stories in One Thousand and One Nights, where he is cast as a boon companion of Harun al-Rashid.

A heavily fictionalised Abu Nuwas is the protagonist of the novels The Father of Locks (Dedalus Books, 2009) and The Khalifah's Mirror (2012) by Andrew Killeen, in which he is depicted as a spy working for Ja'far al-Barmaki.

In the Sudanese novel Season of Migration to the North (1966) by Tayeb Salih, Abu Nuwas's love poetry is cited extensively by one of the novel's protagonists, the Sudanese Mustafa Sa'eed, as a means of seducing a young English woman in London: "Does it not please you that the earth is awaking,/ That old virgin wine is there for the taking?"

The Tanzanian artist Godfrey Mwampembwa (Gado) created a Swahili comic book called Abunuwasi which was published in 1996. It features a trickster figure named Abunuwasi as the protagonist in three stories draw inspiration from East African folklore as well as the fictional Abu Nuwasi of One Thousand and One Nights.

In Pasolini's Arabian Nights, the Sium story is based on Abu Nuwas' erotic poetry. The original poems are used throughout the scene.

In Indonesia, Abu Nuwas, called Abunawas, is a character of various folk stories, similar to Nasreddin Hoca. The stories often highlight relations between ordinary people and the higher class.

== Editions and translations ==
- Der Dīwān des Abū Nuwās, ed. by Ewald Wagner. 5 vols. (1958-2003).
- Dīwān Abū Nu’ās, khamriyyāt Abū Nu’ās, ed. by ‘Alī Najīb ‘Aṭwi (Beirut 1986).
- O Tribe That Loves Boys. Hakim Bey (Entimos Press / Abu Nuwas Society, 1993). With a scholarly biographical essay on Abu Nuwas, largely taken from Ewald Wagner's biographical entry in The Encyclopedia of Islam.
- Carousing with Gazelles, Homoerotic Songs of Old Baghdad. Seventeen poems by Abu Nuwas translated by Jaafar Abu Tarab. (iUniverse, Inc., 2005).
- Jim Colville. Poems of Wine and Revelry: The Khamriyyat of Abu Nuwas. (Kegan Paul, 2005).
- The Khamriyyāt of Abū Nuwās: Medieval Bacchic Poetry, trans. by Fuad Matthew Caswell (Kibworth Beauchamp: Matador, 2015). Trans. from ‘Aṭwi 1986.

== Sources ==
- Arbuthnot, F.F. (1890). Arabic Authors: A Manual of Arabian History and Literature. W. Heinemann. LCCN 43050203.
- Fatehi-Nezhad, Enayatollah; Azarnoosh, Azartash; Negahban, Farzin (2008). "Abū Nuwās". In Madelung, Wilferd; Daftary, Farhad (eds.). Encyclopaedia Islamica Online. Brill Online. ISSN 1875-9831.
- Flügel, Gustav (1862). Die grammatischen Schulen der Araber [The Grammatical Schools of the Arabs] (in German). Leipzig: Brockhaus. OCLC 1042925515.
- Gado (1998). Abunuwasi. Sasa Sema Publications. ISBN 9966-9609-0-2. OCLC 475143542.
- Ibn-Hallikān, Aḥmad Ibn-Muḥammad (1961). Wafayat al-a'yan wa anbã' abna' al-zamãn [The Obituaries of Eminent Men] (in Arabic). Pakistan Historical Society. OCLC 633767474.
- Ibn al-Nadīm, Muḥammad ibn Isḥāq (1970). Dodge, Bayard (ed.). The Fihrist of al-Nadīm : a tenth-century survey of Muslim culture. Columbia University Press. ISBN 0-231-02925-X. OCLC 298105272.
- Killeen, Andrew (2009). The Father of Locks. Dedalus. ISBN 978-1-903517-76-5.
- Mahoney, T.J. (2013). Mercury. Springer New York. ISBN 978-1-4614-7951-2.
- Pilcher, Tim (2005). The Essential Guide to World Comics. Collins & Brown. ISBN 1-84340-300-5. OCLC 61302672.
- Ṣāliḥ, al-Ṭayyib (1991). Season of Migration to the North. Translated by Denys Johnson-Davies. Heinemann. ISBN 978-0-435-90974-1.
- Straley, Dona S. (2004). The undergraduate's companion to Arab writers and their web sites. Libraries Unlimited. p. 30. ISBN 978-1-59158-118-5.
- Wagner, Ewald (2007). "Abū Nuwās". In Fleet, Kate; Krämer, Gudrun; Matringe, Denis; Nawas, John; Rowson, Everett (eds.). Encyclopaedia of Islam (3rd ed.). Brill Online. ISSN 1873-9830.
