= List of ambassadors of the United States to Kuwait =

Ambassador of the United States to Kuwait
- سفير الولايات المتحدة الأمريكية في دولة الكويت
- Seal of the United States Department of State

- Flag of a United States ambassador

- Incumbent; Steven R. Butler; Chargé d'affaires ad interim since July 9, 2025
- Nominator: The president of the United States
- Appointer: The president; with Senate advice and consent
- Inaugural holder: Dayton S. Mak as Chargé d'Affaires
- Formation: 1961
- Website: U.S. Embassy - Kuwait City

This is a list of United States ambassadors, or lower-ranking diplomatic heads, to Kuwait.

== Ambassadors ==
- Dayton S. Mak (1961–1962) – Chargé d'Affaires
- Parker T. Hart (1962–1963) – First ambassador
- Howard Rex Cottam (1963–1969)
- John Patrick Walsh (1969–1971)
- William A. Stoltzfus, Jr. (1972–1976)
- Frank E. Maestrone (1976–1979)
- Francois M. Dickman (1979–1983)
- Philip J. Griffin (1983–1984) – Chargé d'Affaires
- Anthony Cecil Eden Quainton (1984–1987)
- W. Nathaniel Howell (1987–1991) – left occupied Kuwait in December during DESERT SHIELD before the start of the First Gulf War
- Edward William Gnehm, Jr. (1991–1994) – reopened the embassy following the liberation of Kuwait, February 1991
- Ryan Clark Crocker (1994–1997)
- James A. Larocco (1997–2001)
- Richard Jones (2001–2004)
- Richard LeBaron (2004–2007)
- Deborah K. Jones (2008–2011)
- Matthew H. Tueller (2011–2014)
- Michael J. Adler (May–August 2014) – Chargé d'Affaires, a.i.
- Douglas Silliman (August 2014–August 2016)
- Lawrence R. Silverman (September 2016–2019)
- Larry L. Memmott became Deputy Chief of Mission at the Embassy in Kuwait on September 10, 2018, and took over leadership of Embassy Kuwait as Chargé d’affaires a.i. on October 5, 2019.
- Alina Romanowski (February 2020–April 2022)
- James Holtsnider (April 2022-November 2023) – Chargé d'Affaires a.i.
- Karen Sasahara (November 2023-July 2025)

== See also ==
- Kuwait – United States relations
- Foreign relations of Kuwait
- Ambassadors of the United States
