= Abu Nuwas (crater) =

Crater on Mercury

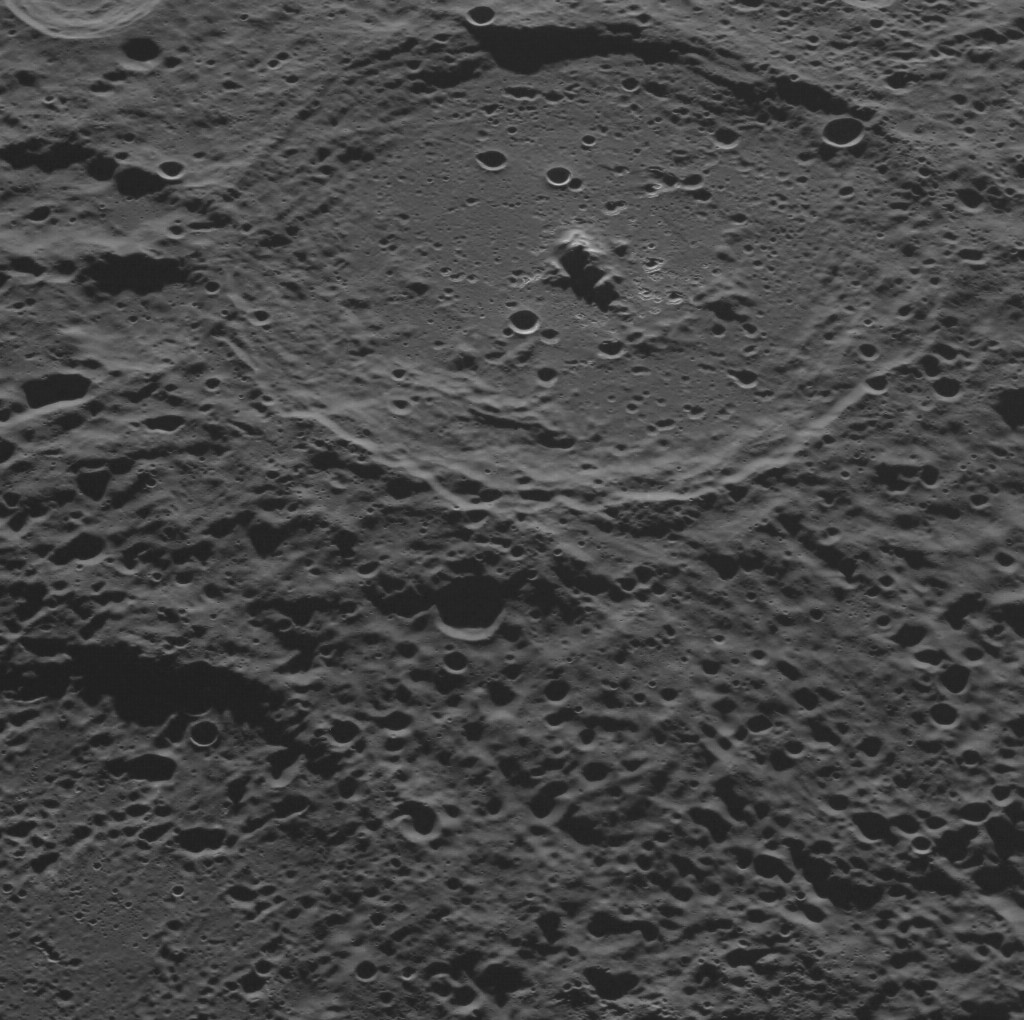
- MESSENGER Wide Angle Camera image. North is to the right.
- Feature type: Impact crater
- Location: Kuiper quadrangle, Mercury
- Coordinates: 17.63°N 21.19°W
- Diameter: 117 km (73 mi)

Abu Nuwas is an impact crater on the planet Mercury. It is named after the Arab poet Abu Nuwas, and its name was approved by the International Astronomical Union in 1976. The crater was first imaged by Mariner 10 in 1974.

There is small central peak in the center of the floor of Abu Nuwas, and bright features known as hollows are present near the peak.

To the north of Abu Nuwas are the craters Ts'ai Wen-Chi and Rodin. To the southwest is the crater Molière, and the crater Aśvaghosa can be found toward the south.

== Views ==
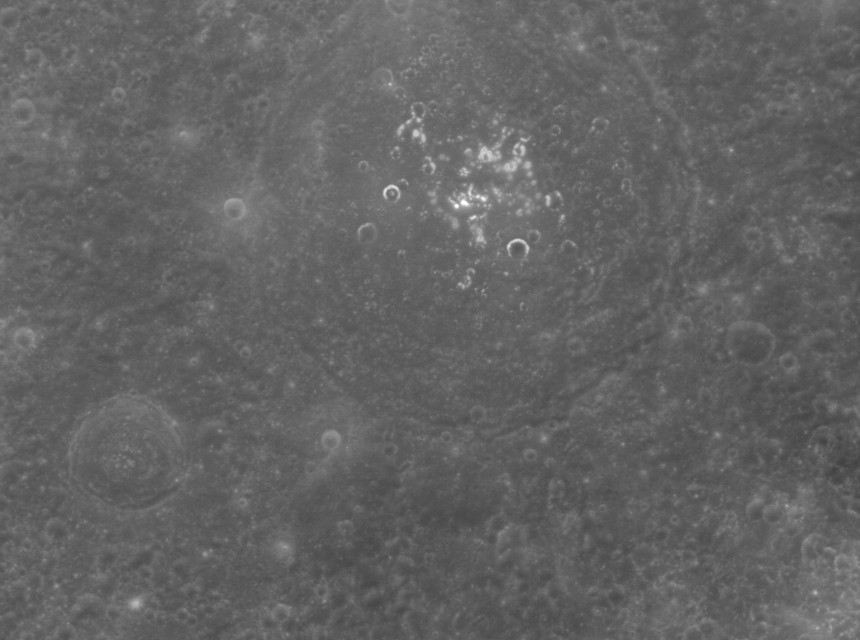
Abu Nuwas at high sun angle. Note bright features near center which are hollows.

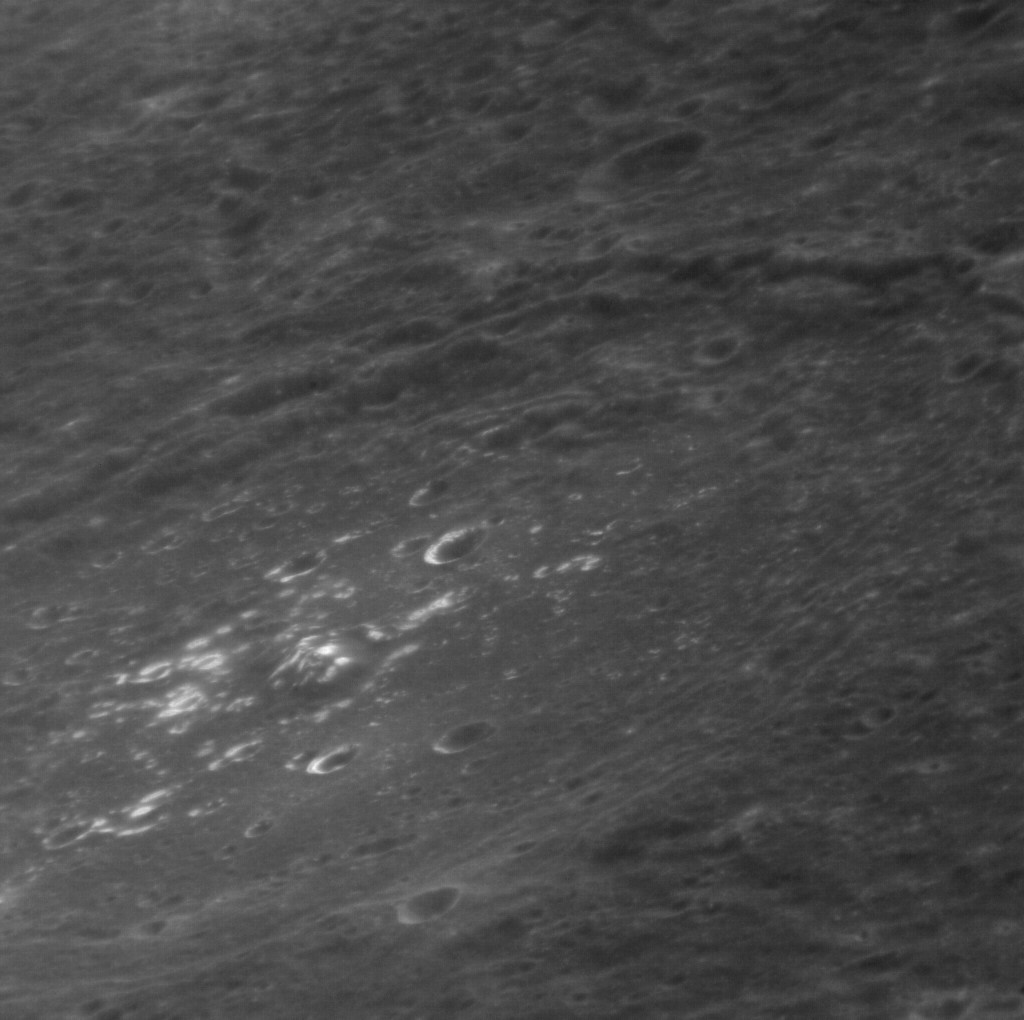
Highly oblique view of Abu Nuwas at high sun angle, also showing the hollows.
