= Bodde =

Bodde is a surname. Notable people with the surname include:

- Derk Bodde (1909–2003), American sinologist and historian
- Ferrie Bodde (born 1982), Dutch footballer and coach
- Peter W. Bodde (born 1954), American diplomat, son of William
- William Bodde Jr. (1931–2020), American diplomat
