= Alina Romanowski =

American diplomat (born 1955)

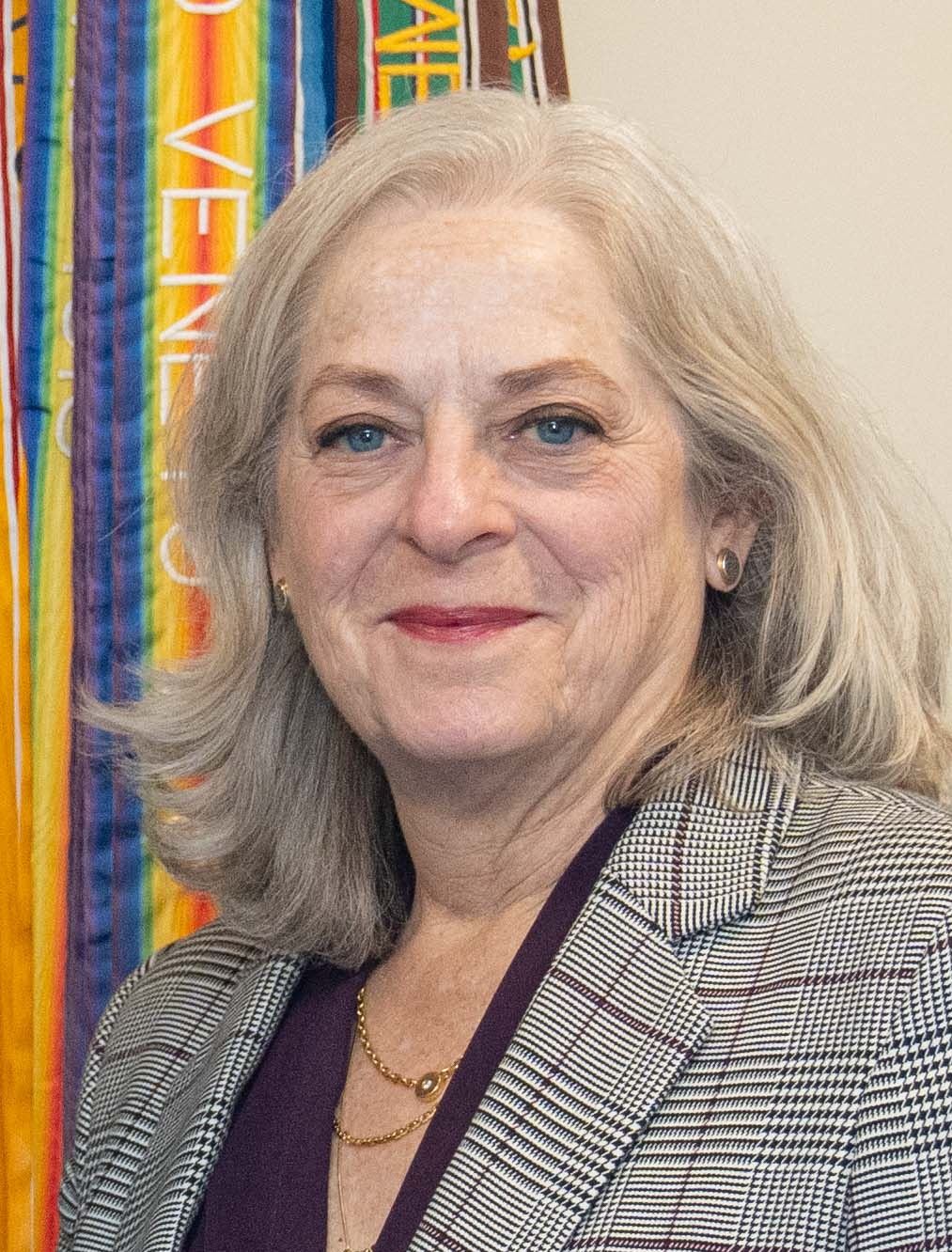
- Romanowski at the Pentagon on December 13, 2024

United States Ambassador to Iraq
- In office June 2, 2022 – December 7, 2024
- President: Joe Biden
- Preceded by: Matthew H. Tueller

United States Ambassador to Kuwait
- In office February 11, 2020 – April 15, 2022
- President: Donald Trump; Joe Biden
- Preceded by: Lawrence R. Silverman
- Succeeded by: Karen Sasahara

Personal details
- Born: Alina L. Romanowski; September 26, 1955 (age 71)
- Education: University of Chicago (BA, MA)

Alina L. Romanowski (born September 26, 1955) is an American career diplomat who had served as the United States Ambassador to Iraq from June 2022 to December 2024. She previously served as the United States Ambassador to Kuwait from February 2020 to April 2022.

== Early life and education ==
Alina Romanowski is from Illinois. Her father Thomas A. Romanowski, was born in Warsaw, Poland and in 1946 immigrated to the U.S. He was a professor of high-energy physics. Her mother, Carmen M. Romanowski, emigrated from Canada and was a French language teacher. Alina Romanowski earned bachelor's and master's degrees from the University of Chicago. She also attended Tel Aviv University in Israel.

== Career ==
While she was a student at the University of Chicago, Romanowski interviewed on campus with the CIA and began a career in the U.S. government.

Romanowski has spent four decades in U.S. public service roles, focused in large part in Near East and South Asia. She worked for the Central Intelligence Agency as an intelligence analyst on the Near East and South Asia region for ten years. She served as the director of the NESA Office and country director for Israel. Romanowski served as founding Director of the Near East-South Asia Center for Strategic Studies at the National Defense University, as well as deputy assistant secretary of defense for Near Eastern and South Asian affairs in the Office of the Secretary of Defense.

In 2003, she joined the State Department to establish the Middle East Partnership Initiative Office and serve as its first director. She also served in two deputy assistant secretary positions in the Bureau of Education and Cultural Affairs and as acting deputy assistant secretary in the Bureau of Near Eastern Affairs.

From 2011 to 2015, Romanowski served at USAID as deputy assistant administrator for the Middle East Bureau. In March 2015 she became the coordinator for U.S. assistance to Europe and Eurasia in the State Department's Bureau for European and Eurasian Affairs, overseeing all U.S. federal assistance to thirty countries in Europe and Eurasia, including Central Asia.

Romanowski became principal deputy coordinator for Counterterrorism in 2017, after serving in an acting role.

=== Ambassador to Kuwait ===
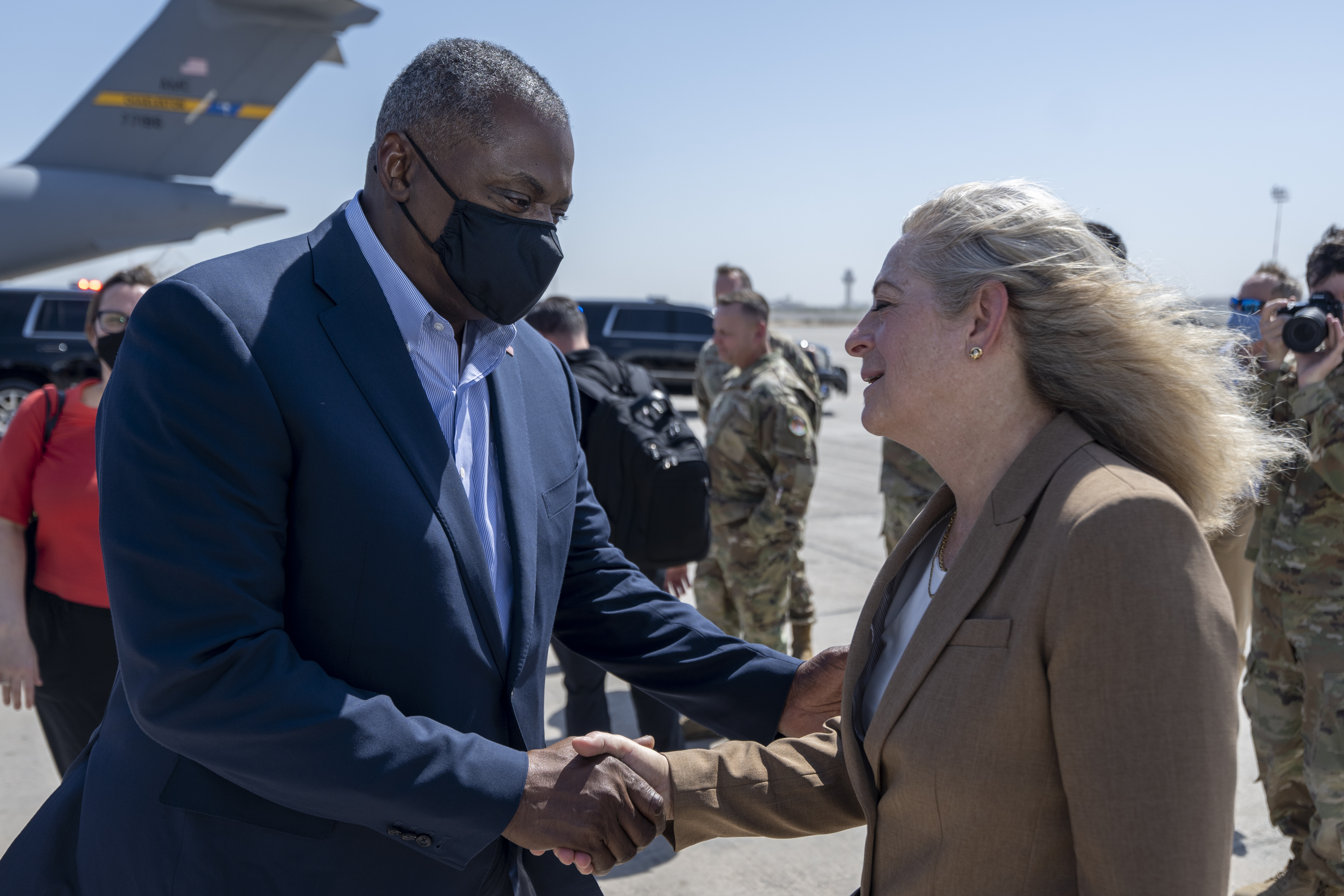
Romanowski with Defense Secretary Lloyd Austin in September 2021

On July 25, 2019, President Donald Trump nominated Romanowski to serve as the ambassador to Kuwait. Hearings were held before the Senate Foreign Relations Committee on the nomination on October 31, 2019. The committee favorably reported her nomination to the Senate floor on November 20, 2019. Romanowski was confirmed by the Senate via voice vote on December 19, 2019. Romanowski presented her credentials to Kuwaiti Emir Sheikh Sabah Al-Ahmad Al-Jaber Al-Sabah at Bayan Palace in Kuwait City on February 11, 2020.

=== Ambassador to Iraq ===
On December 8, 2021, President Joe Biden nominated Romanowski to be the ambassador to Iraq. Hearings on her nomination were held before the Foreign Relations Committee on March 3, 2022. The committee favorably reported her nomination to the Senate floor on March 23, 2022. The entire Senate confirmed Romanowski by voice vote on March 24, 2022. She presented her credentials to President Barham Salih on June 2, 2022.

== Personal life ==
Romanowski speaks French, Arabic and Hebrew.

== See also ==
- Ambassadors of the United States
- List of ambassadors appointed by Donald Trump
- List of ambassadors appointed by Joe Biden

Diplomatic posts
Preceded by Lawrence R. Silverman	United States Ambassador to Kuwait; 2020–2022	Succeeded by Karen Sasahara
Preceded by Matthew H. Tueller	United States Ambassador to Iraq; 2022–2024	Succeeded by Vacant
