= Embassy of the United States, Baghdad =

United States embassy in Iraq

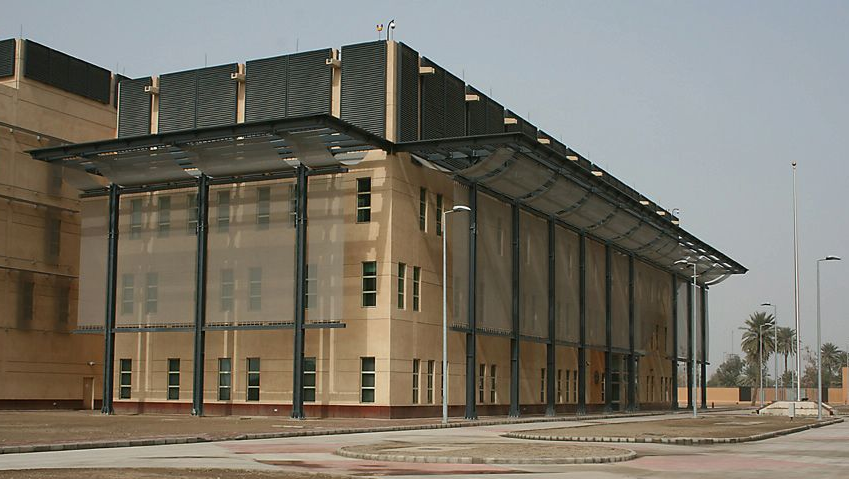
- Chancery Building in January 2014
- Location: Baghdad, Iraq 33.299°N 44.386°E
- Opened: May 2008; 18 years ago
- Ambassador: Steven Fagin; Chargé d'affaires (since September 2026)
- Jurisdiction: Iraq
- Website: Official website

The Embassy of the United States of America in Baghdad (Arabic: سفارة الولايات المتحدة، بغداد) is the diplomatic mission of the United States of America in the Republic of Iraq. Chargé d'affaires ad interim Steven Fagin is currently the chief of mission.

At 104 acres (42 ha), it is the largest diplomatic mission compound in the world; nearly equal in area size to Vatican City. The embassy complex is about 2.5 times the size of the Embassy of the United States, Beirut, which is the second-largest U.S. diplomatic mission abroad, as well as over three times the size of the Embassy of the United States, Islamabad, which is the third-largest U.S. diplomatic mission abroad.

The embassy opened in January 2009 following a series of construction delays. It replaced the previous embassy, which opened July 1, 2004 in the Republican Palace in Baghdad's Green Zone. The embassy complex cost US$750 million to build and reached a peak staffing of 16,000 employees and contractors in 2012. The U.S. thereafter embarked on a major personnel reduction that reduced the total staffing to 11,500 in January 2013 and to 5,500 by 2014. Total headcount was reduced to 486 by late 2019 and 349 by mid-2020.

On December 31, 2019, the embassy was attacked by supporters of Popular Mobilization Forces militia in response to airstrikes in Iraq and Syria conducted by United States Air Force the previous Sunday. The embassy was also repeatedly attacked by Iranian-aligned Iraqi Shiite militias and Iranian Islamic Revolutionary Guard Corps following President Trump's order for a drone strike assassination against Qasem Soleimani and Abu Mahdi al-Muhandis in Baghdad Airport on January 3, 2020.

== History ==
=== 1930–1967: Origins ===
The United States Department of State established diplomatic relations with Iraq in 1930 and opened a legation in Baghdad. The legation was upgraded to an embassy in 1946. A new building was designed by Josep Lluís Sert in 1955 and completed in 1957, with its main priority on keeping the building cool rather than to ensure security.

=== 1967–2003: Turbulent relations ===
This building remained the embassy until the Six-Day War of 1967, when many Arab countries broke off diplomatic relations with the United States. In 1972, the embassy became the U.S. Interests Section (USINT) of the Belgian Embassy to Iraq, as Belgium was the protecting power for the United States presence in Iraq. USINT, however, was not housed in the building the Embassy had occupied prior to 1967, as that building had been taken over and made into the Iraqi Ministry of Foreign Affairs. USINT was housed in what had earlier been the Romanian Embassy building, in the Masbah section of the city, on the east bank of the Tigris and opposite the Foreign Ministry Club. The U.S. Interests Section was again upgraded to an embassy in 1984 after the resumption of U.S.–Iraqi diplomatic relations. The building lost its embassy status just before the Gulf War in 1991, which caused a second breach of diplomatic relations between the two countries. The U.S. Interests Section was then re-established with Poland as the protecting power.

=== 2003–2008: Republican Palace ===
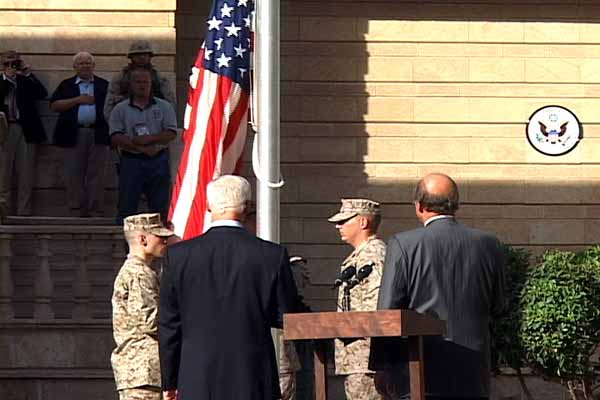
Former Ambassador to Iraq John D. Negroponte, right, shows honors to the colors as U.S. Marine Security Guards raise the U.S. flag on the grounds of the old U.S. Embassy in Iraq on July 1, 2004.

In 2003, the United States invaded Iraq and overthrew the government of Saddam Hussein. The U.S. then established diplomatic relations with the new Iraqi government. Because the old U.S. embassy was located outside of the Green Zone, it was deemed unsafe for American diplomats and remained deserted. A temporary embassy was established in the Republican Palace. The embassy planned to hire 900–1,000 permanent American employees under mission authority, along with 300-400 staff under military command and an additional 600-700 Iraqi staff by the end of 2004.

=== 2008–present: New embassy ===
A new complex for the embassy was constructed along the Tigris River, west of the Arbataash Tamuz Bridge, and facing Al-Kindi street to the north. The embassy is a permanent structure which has provided a new base for the 5,500 Americans currently living and working in Baghdad. During construction, the U.S. government kept many aspects of the project under wraps, with many details released only in a U.S. Senate Foreign Relations Committee report. Apart from the 1,000 regular employees, up to 3,000 additional staff members have been hired, including security personnel.

With construction beginning in mid-2005, the original target completion date was September 2007. "A week after submitting his FY2006 budget to Congress, the President sent Congress an FY2005 emergency supplemental funding request. Included in the supplemental is more than $1.3 billion for the embassy in Iraq." An emergency supplemental appropriation (H.R. 1268/P.L. 109–13), which included $592 million for embassy construction, was signed into law on May 11, 2005. According to the Department of State, this funding was all that was needed for construction of the U.S. Embassy in Baghdad. However, Walter Pincus of The Washington Post found that the new embassy had cost more than $700 million by 2012; Business Insider reported in 2013 that the cost of the embassy had surpassed $750 million. The Obama administration requested more than $100 million for a "massive" upgrade to the embassy compound in 2012. As of 2006, construction was being led by the Kuwaiti firm First Kuwaiti Trading & Contracting.

The embassy has extensive housing and infrastructure facilities in addition to the usual diplomatic buildings. The buildings include:

- Six apartment buildings for employees
- Water and waste treatment facilities
- A power station
- Two "major diplomatic office buildings"
- Recreation, including a gym, cinema, several tennis courts and an Olympic-size swimming pool

The complex is heavily fortified, even by the standards of the Green Zone. The details are largely secret, but it is likely to include a significant US Marine Security Guard detachment. Fortifications include deep security perimeters, buildings reinforced beyond the usual standard, and five highly guarded entrances.

On October 5, 2007, the Associated Press reported the initial target completion date of September would not be met, and that it was unlikely any buildings would be occupied until 2008. In May 2008, US diplomats began moving into the embassy.

The embassy formally opened over a year behind schedule in January 2009 with a staff of over 16,000 people, mostly contractors, but including 2,000 diplomats. In February 2012, weeks after the final departure of US Military forces from Iraq, the State Department announced that the staff would be greatly reduced because of budget concerns and a re-evaluation of diplomatic strategy in Iraq, in light of the military withdrawal.

The Office of Security Cooperation — Iraq, part of the larger Embassy after the 2011 U.S. withdrawal held the remaining Department of Defense support personnel, totalling about 1,000 contractors and about 147 DOD uniformed personnel. It operated from ten locations around Iraq, and managed about 370 Foreign Military Sales cases, totaling more than US$9 billion of pending arms sales, citing a February 2012 Congressional Research Service report. The biggest program underway was the much-delayed sale of 18 Lockheed Martin F-16 Fighting Falcon fighters. However, OSC-I was hampered by the tasks assigned to it when the U.S. had expected to leave substantial forces behind, including a division headquarters, to administer training programmes. Instead OSC-I only started with 157 personnel. As a hybrid office OSC-I was also caught between the models that the State and Defense Departments used to obtain funding.

On May 15, 2019, the State Department ordered all non-emergency, non-essential government employees at the Embassy and Erbil consulate office to leave Iraq amid heightened tensions in the Persian Gulf between the United States and Iran. On December 31, 2019, thousands of demonstrators attacked the embassy and breached the outside walls in response to an airstrike that killed 25 on December 27. President Donald Trump blamed Iran for the embassy attack and deployed 750 troops to Baghdad.

On January 26, 2020, the embassy was struck by three rockets. One of the rockets struck a cafeteria. The United States urged Iraq to protect the embassy.

On March 14, 2026, the embassy was struck by an Iranian missile and possibly a drone, damaging a helipad and causing a fire.

== See also ==
- Embassy of Iraq, Washington, D.C.
- Consulate General of the United States in Erbil
- Iraq–United States relations
- List of ambassadors of the United States to Iraq
- Attack on the United States embassy in Baghdad
- 2020 Baghdad International Airport airstrike
