= Aśvaghoṣa (crater) =

Crater on Mercury

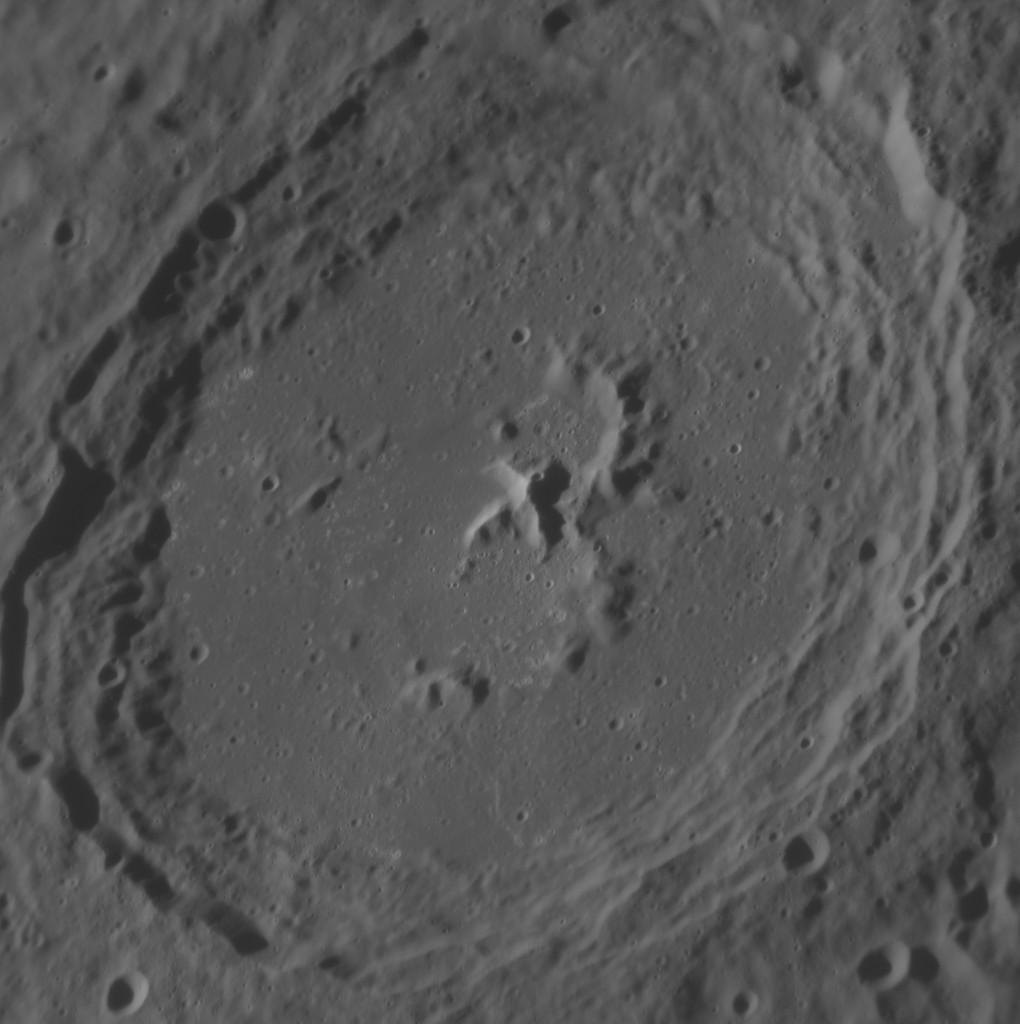
- MESSENGER NAC
- Feature type: Impact crater
- Location: Kuiper quadrangle, Mercury
- Coordinates: 10.61°N 21.49°W
- Diameter: 88 km (55 mi)
- Eponym: Aśvaghoṣa

Aśvaghoṣa is an impact crater on Mercury. It is a nearly circular formation, and its rim remains intact, except where it is broken at its southern side, and at its northern side by an indentation from two conjoined craters.

On the crater floor is a central mountain that rises to multiple peaks. Hollows are present on the crater floor around the peaks, and a few are near the crater rim.

The crater is named for Indian philosopher and poet Aśvaghoṣa, and its name was adopted by the International Astronomical Union in 1976. The crater was first imaged by Mariner 10 in 1974.

Aśvaghoṣa is located south of the crater Abu Nuwas and southwest of the crater Molière.

== Views ==
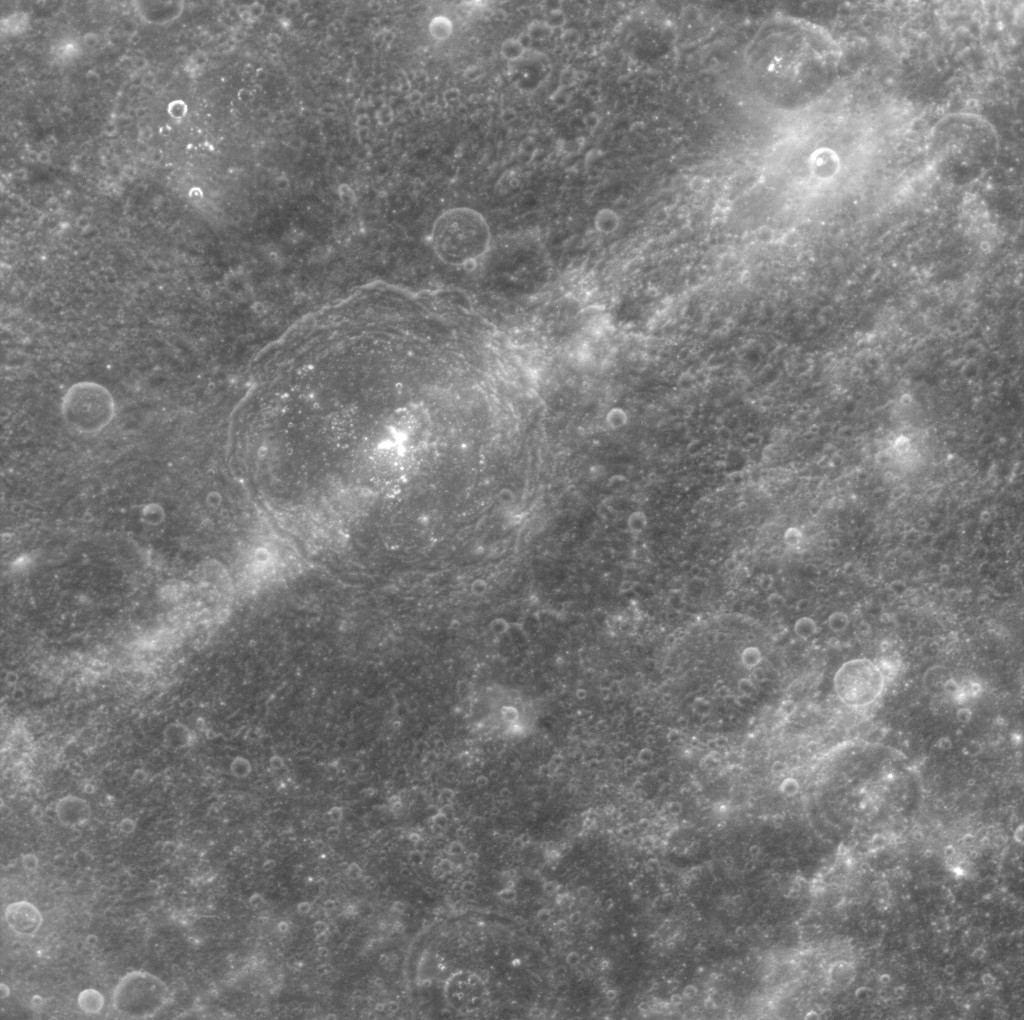
A ray from Hokusai crater far to the north crosses Aśvaghoṣa

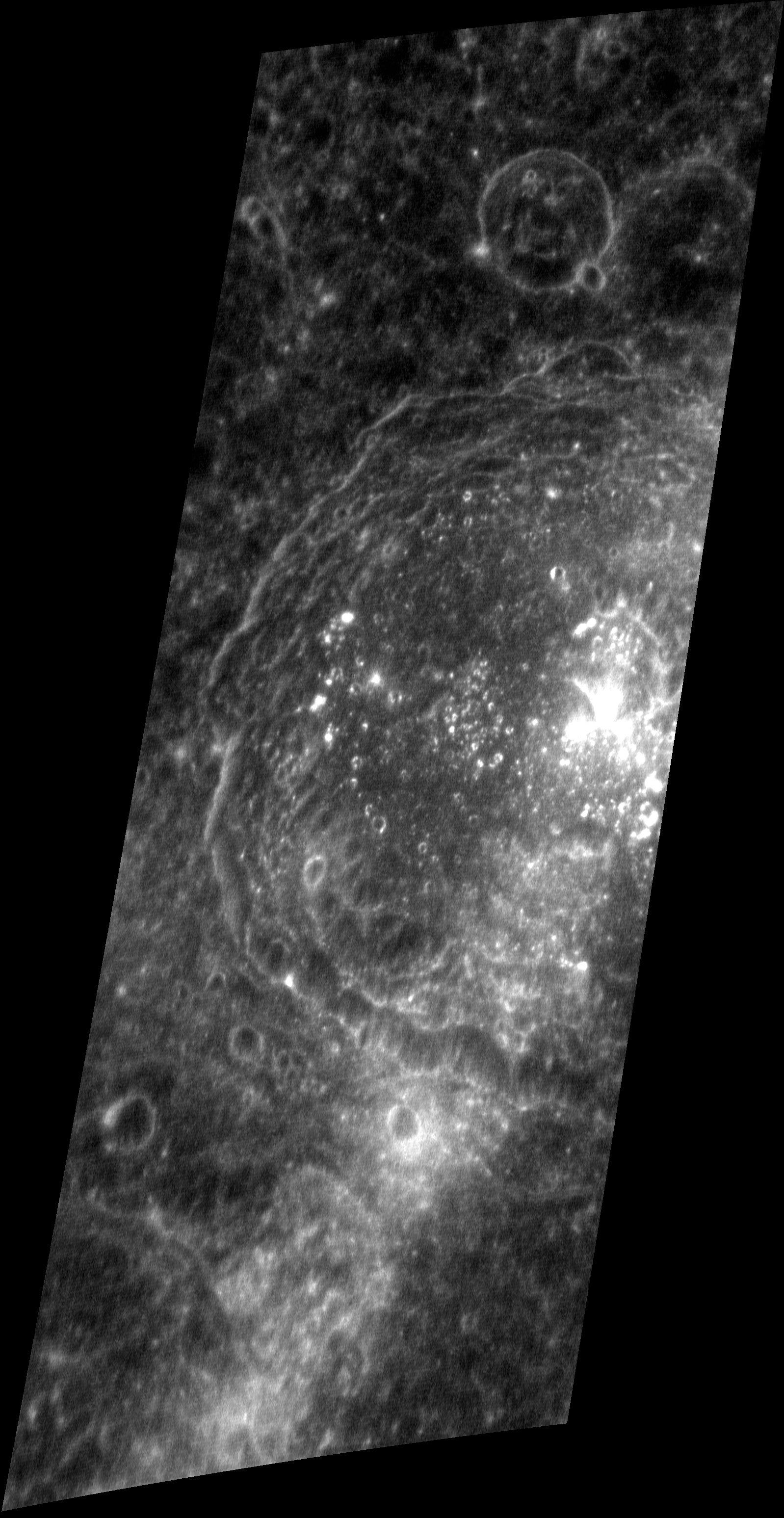
Map-projected view of western Aśvaghoṣa crater

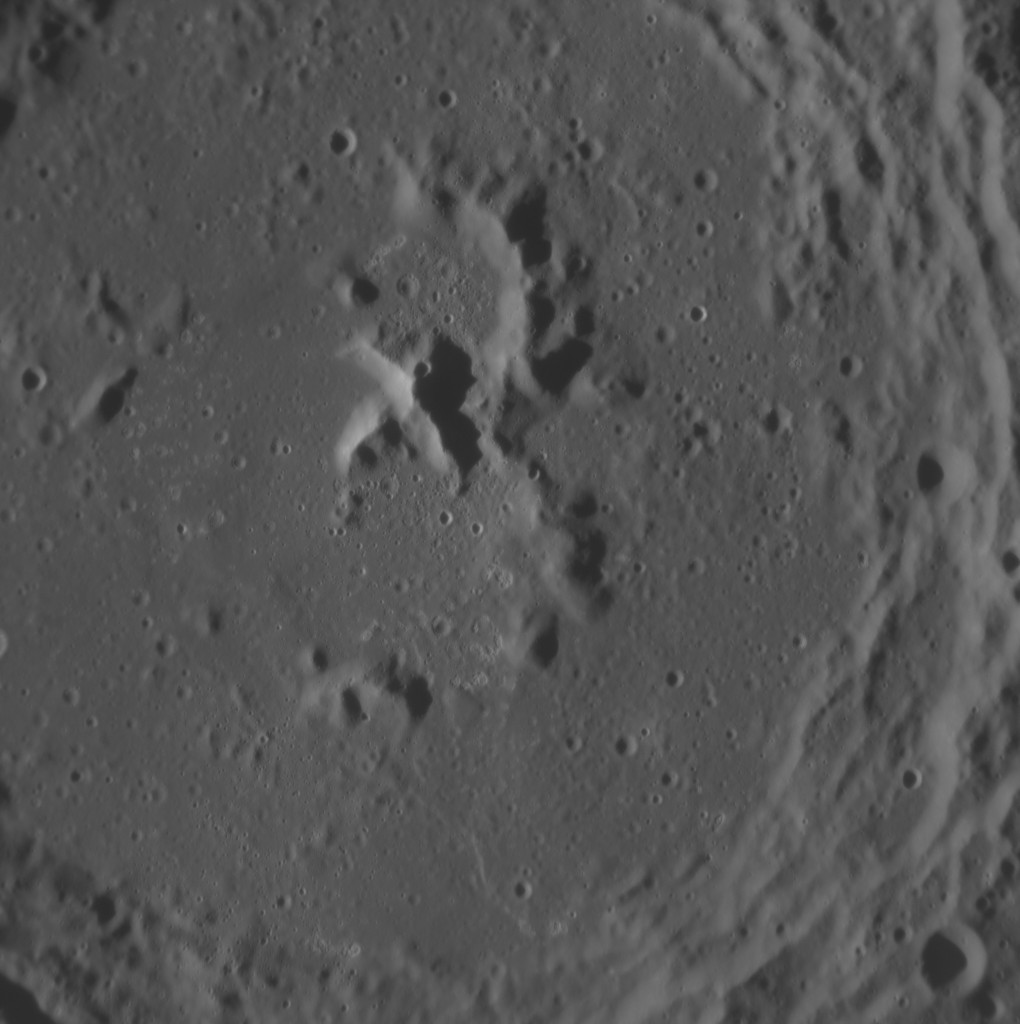
Close-up of the central peak complex, showing hollows
