= First Kuwaiti General Trading & Contracting Company =

Construction company in Kuwait

- Industry: Contracting
- Founded: 1996; 29 years ago
- Founders: Wadih al-Absi; Mohammed Maaraf
- Headquarters: Kuwait City, Kuwait
- Area served: Kuwait, Iraq
- Website: firstkuwaiti.com

First Kuwaiti General Trading & Contracting Company (also known as First Kuwaiti Trading Company and FKTC) is a construction company founded in 1996 by Wadih al-Absi and Mohammed Maaraf which has been engaged by the United States government for over two hundred projects in Kuwait and Iraq. The company was contracted to build the Embassy of the United States in Baghdad in 2004. The embassy was officially completed on May 12, 2008, at the cost of $736 million. The United States officials in charge of the project were said to have been pleased with the work FKTC had done on the embassy.

== Labor allegations ==
The company has received substantial criticism, both for the physical quality of its work, and for allegations of labor abuse which came to light in testimony given by former First Kuwaiti employees to an Oversight Committee of the United States Congress; one former employee claimed that First Kuwaiti had promised these laborers from, among many countries, India, the Philippines, West Africa and China jobs in Dubai and Kuwait at wages as much as four times their current salaries, only to be flown into Iraq and forced into work there. In addition, some laborers were charged arbitrary fees (ranging from $1000 to $1800) just for the opportunity to work elsewhere, to also be flown into Iraq and have their passports collected. Several months before that hearing, the nongovernmental research group CorpWatch had reported, based on interviews with former officers and employees of First Kuwaiti, that the company was deceiving workers, confiscating their passports, and mistreating them on the job. Furthermore, it was discovered that not only are the workers being forced to endure this treatment, their living environment, nutrition, and health care system are of extremely poor quality. Rory Mayberry, a man sent over by the U.S. Government to help with overseeing some of the project, recalls that "there hadn't been any follow up on medical care. People were walking around intoxicated on pain relievers with unwrapped wounds and there were a lot of infections… The idea that there was any hygiene seemed ridiculous. I'm not sure they were even bathing." Many of the workers face the same obstacle of not being able to leave due to the debt that they are in from paying the fee to work, or not having any form of transportation out of Iraq. After being asked about the mistreatment of the labor force in 2005, general manager al-Absi threatened to sue if any of the allegations against First Kuwaiti were published. In response to the allegations of the mistreatment,

Mayberry's testimony was later called into question after the Wall Street Journal (WSJ) investigated his employment and criminal history writing, "Extensive police and court records from Oregon and California show that Mayberry has a string of convictions going back to the mid-1980s, including two for forgery, one for burglary and a fourth for welfare fraud. In 2004, before heading off to Iraq to work as a medic, foodservice manager, radio technician, and sometimes mortician, Mayberry was fined $4,000 for working as an embalmer without a license and for various Oregon state infractions as a “crematory operator”, records show."

According to the WSJ, Mayberry only worked on the embassy construction project for five days prior to being fired for failure to demonstrate the proper training and credentials for his work as an on-site medic.

== False Claims Act Case ==
A former employee John Owens brought a qui tam suit under the False Claims Act in 2008, alleging that First Kuwaiti had billed falsely for deficient work in relation to the embassy, and that it retaliated against him for actions taken to pursue his claim. The District Court for the Eastern District of Virginia granted summary judgment to the company, but due to a lack of evidence of fraud, a verdict was upheld on appeal. The Appeal Court reiterated that the False Claims Act "does not punish honest mistakes or incorrect claims submitted through mere negligence".
