= Molière (crater) =

Crater on Mercury

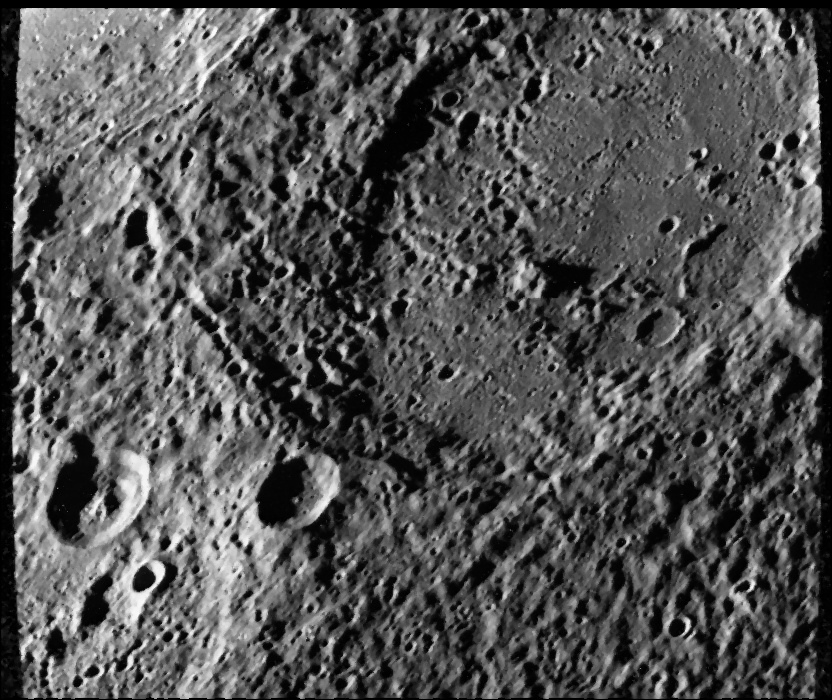
- Oblique Mariner 10 image of Molière
- Feature type: Impact crater
- Location: Kuiper quadrangle, Mercury
- Coordinates: 15.40°N 17.71°W
- Diameter: 139 km (86 mi)
- Eponym: Jean Baptiste Poquelin

Molière is an impact crater on the planet Mercury. The crater was first imaged by Mariner 10 in 1974. The nearly circular rim of the crater is cut off into a flat edge on its southern and southwestern ends, and on its eastern side the rim is indented by a smaller crater.

The crater is named for the 17th-century French dramatist and satirist Molière. The name was approved by the International Astronomical Union in 1976.

It is located south of the crater Rodin, southeast of the crater Abu Nuwas, and northeast of the crater Aśvaghoṣa.

== Views ==
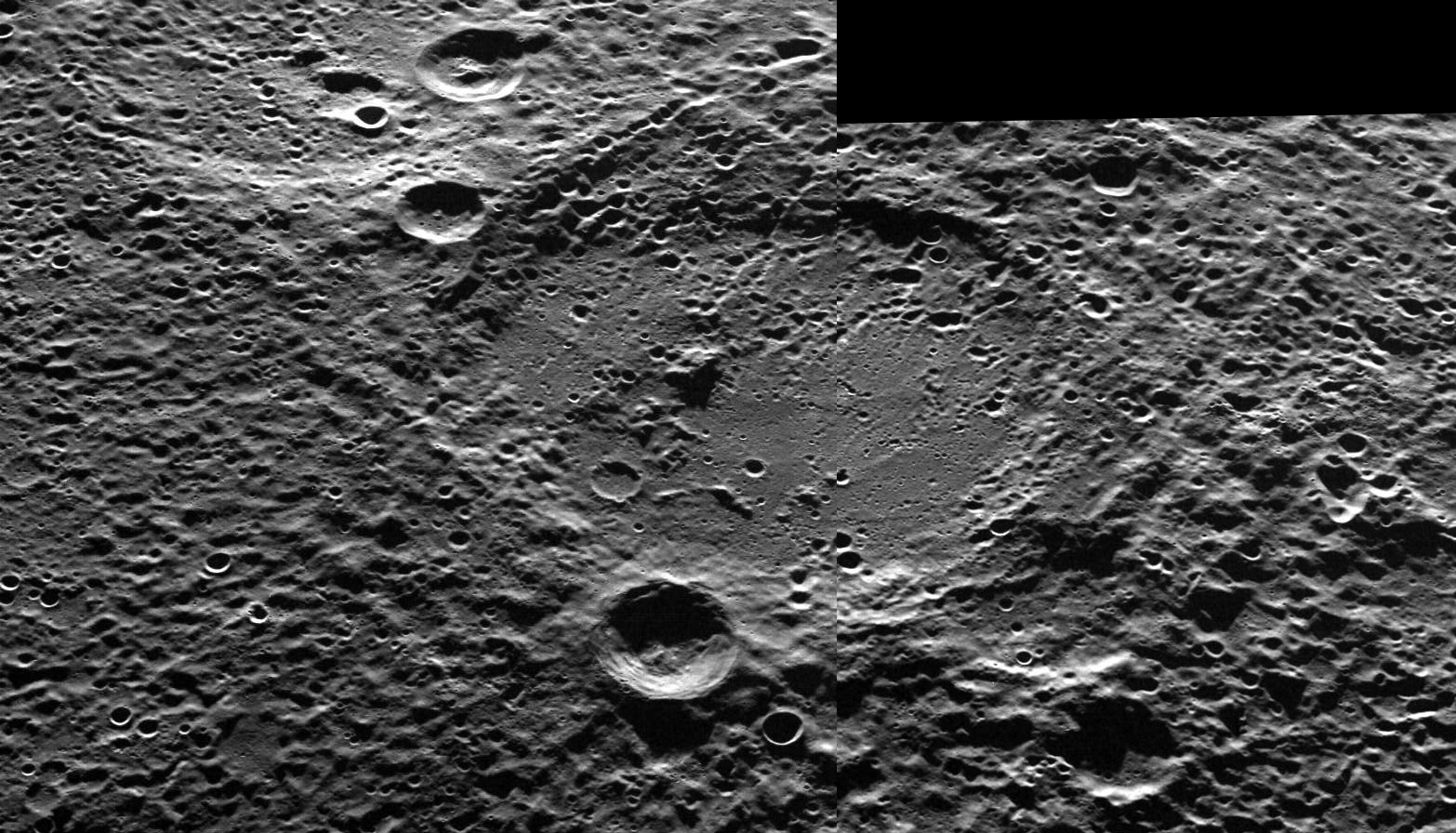
MESSENGER mosaic of Molière crater

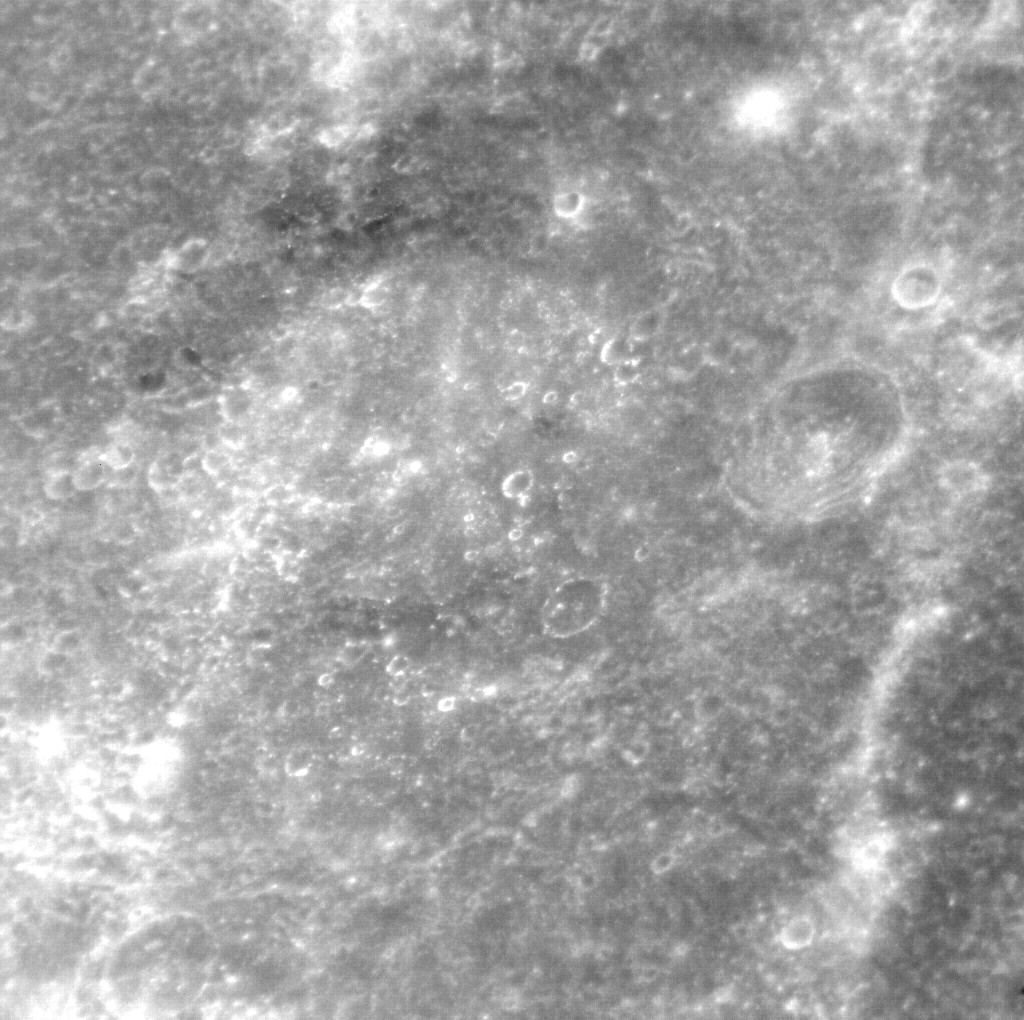
Molière crater at a high sun angle. The crater is barely distinguishable due to lack of shadows. The southern rim is in the lower left corner.
