= Christopher Henzel =

American diplomat

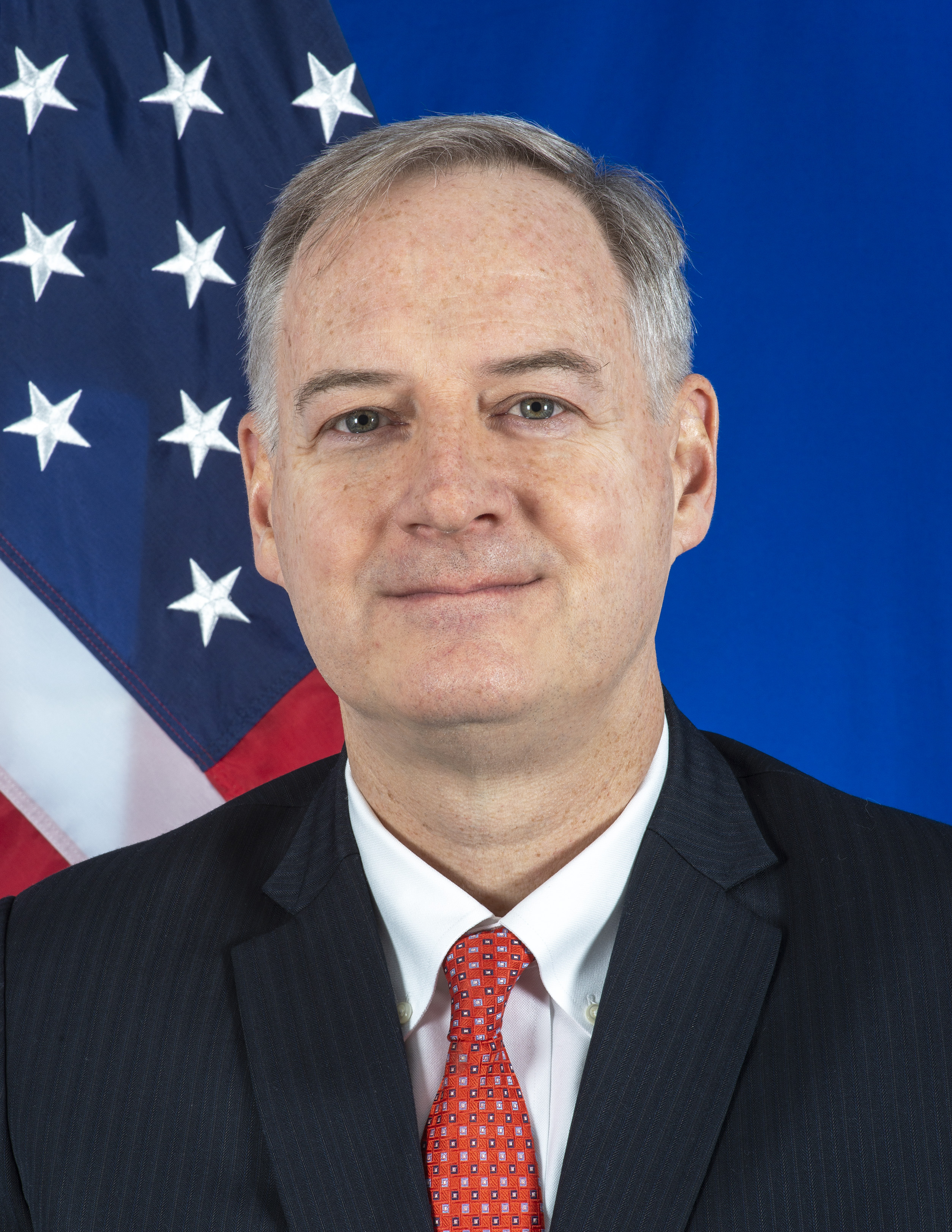

United States Ambassador to Yemen
- In office May 20, 2019 – May 2021
- President: Donald Trump; Joe Biden
- Preceded by: Matthew H. Tueller
- Succeeded by: Steven Fagin

United States Ambassador to Saudi Arabia
- Acting
- In office January 8, 2017 – April 17, 2019
- President: Donald Trump
- Preceded by: Joseph W. Westphal
- Succeeded by: John Abizaid

Personal details
- Born: 1962 (age 63–64)
- Education: College of the Holy Cross (BA); National War College (MS)

Christopher Paul Henzel (born 1962) is an American diplomat who served as United States Ambassador to Yemen from 2019 to 2021.

== Education and career ==
Henzel earned a Bachelor of Arts degree from the College of the Holy Cross and a Master of Science from the National War College.

From January 2017 until April 2019, Henzel was chargé d'affaires ad interim at the American Embassy in Riyadh, Saudi Arabia. From 2013 to 2016, he was director of the Office of Israel and Palestinian Affairs at the State Department in Washington. From 2010 to 2011, he headed the provincial reconstruction office in Mosul, Iraq. He has also served as deputy chief of mission in Manama, Bahrain; and counselor for political affairs in Amman, Jordan. His earlier overseas postings included an assignment in Yemen from 1997 to 1999. He studied Arabic in Tunisia. Henzel entered the Foreign Service in 1985.

=== United States Ambassador to Yemen ===
On September 21, 2018, President Trump nominated Henzel to be the next United States Ambassador to Yemen. On January 2, 2019, the Senate confirmed his nomination by voice vote. Henzel concluded his term in May 2021.

== Personal life ==
Henzel speaks Arabic, Spanish and German.

== See also ==
- List of ambassadors appointed by Donald Trump

Diplomatic posts
Preceded by Matthew H. Tueller	United States Ambassador to Yemen; 2019–2021	Succeeded by Steven Fagin
