= Rodin (crater) =

Crater on Mercury

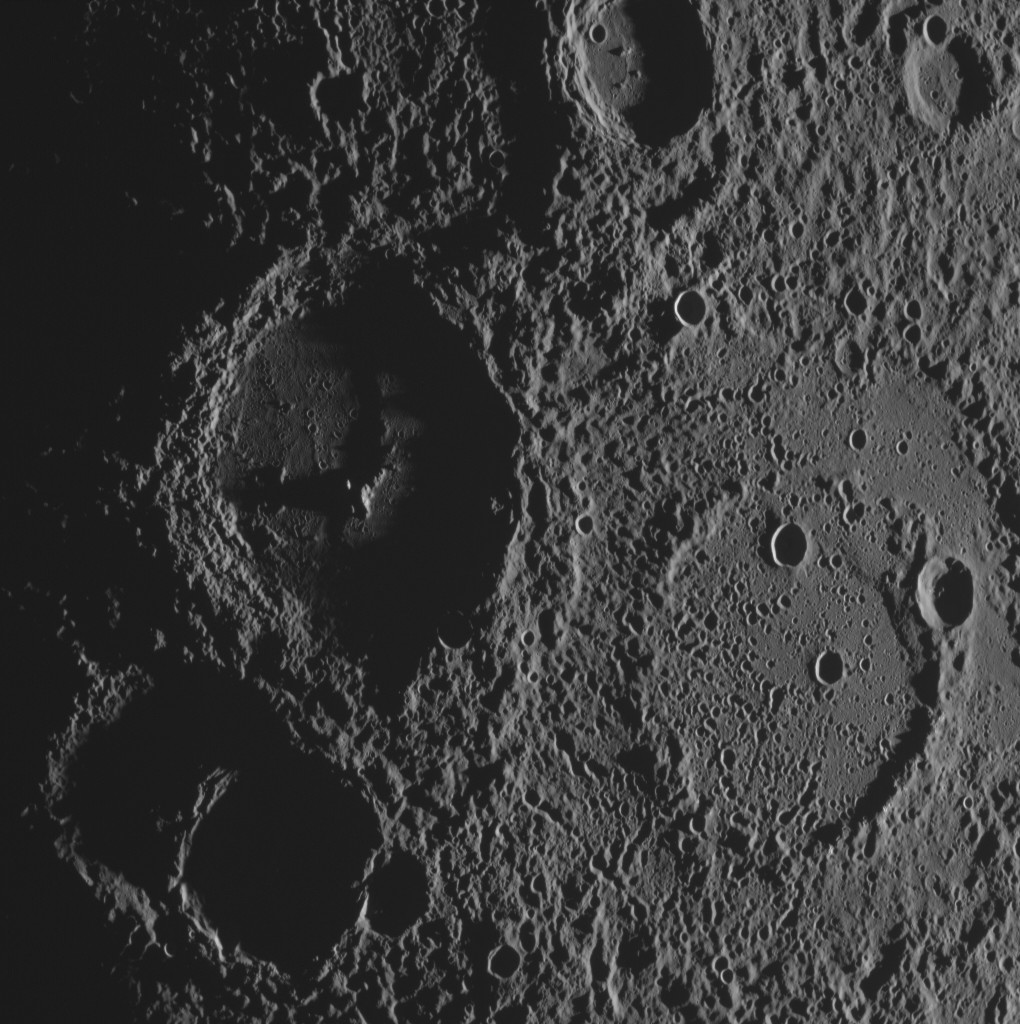
- MESSENGER wide angle camera image of Rodin (right) and Ts'ai Wen-Chi (left)
- Feature type: Peak-ring impact basin
- Location: Victoria quadrangle, Mercury
- Coordinates: 21.72°N 18.89°W
- Diameter: 230.0 km (142.9 mi)
- Eponym: Auguste Rodin

Rodin is an impact crater on the planet Mercury, 230 kilometers in diameter. The rim is even and circular, except where it is broken in two places toward the north and south. It is named for the French sculptor Auguste Rodin. Its name was approved by the International Astronomical Union in 1976. The crater was first imaged by Mariner 10 in 1974.

Rodin is one of 110 peak ring basins on Mercury.

Rodin is located north of the craters Abu Nuwas and Moliere, and east of the crater Ts'ai Wen-Chi.

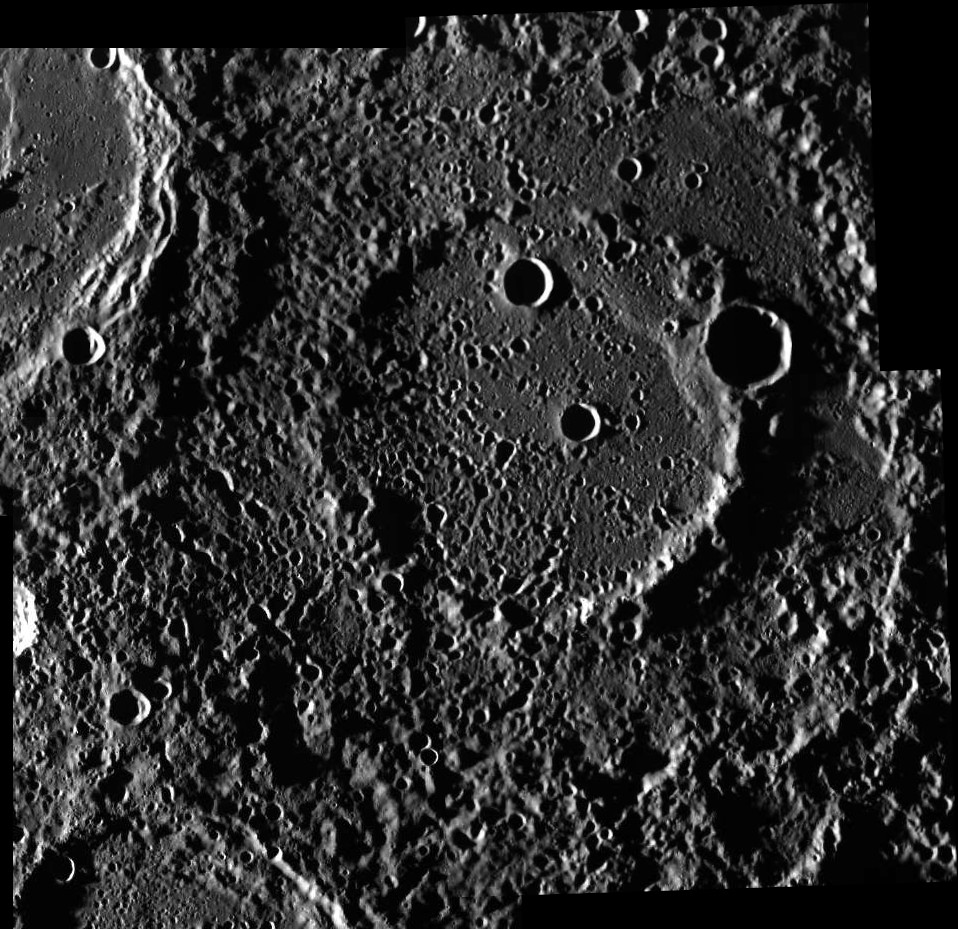
MESSENGER WAC mosaic

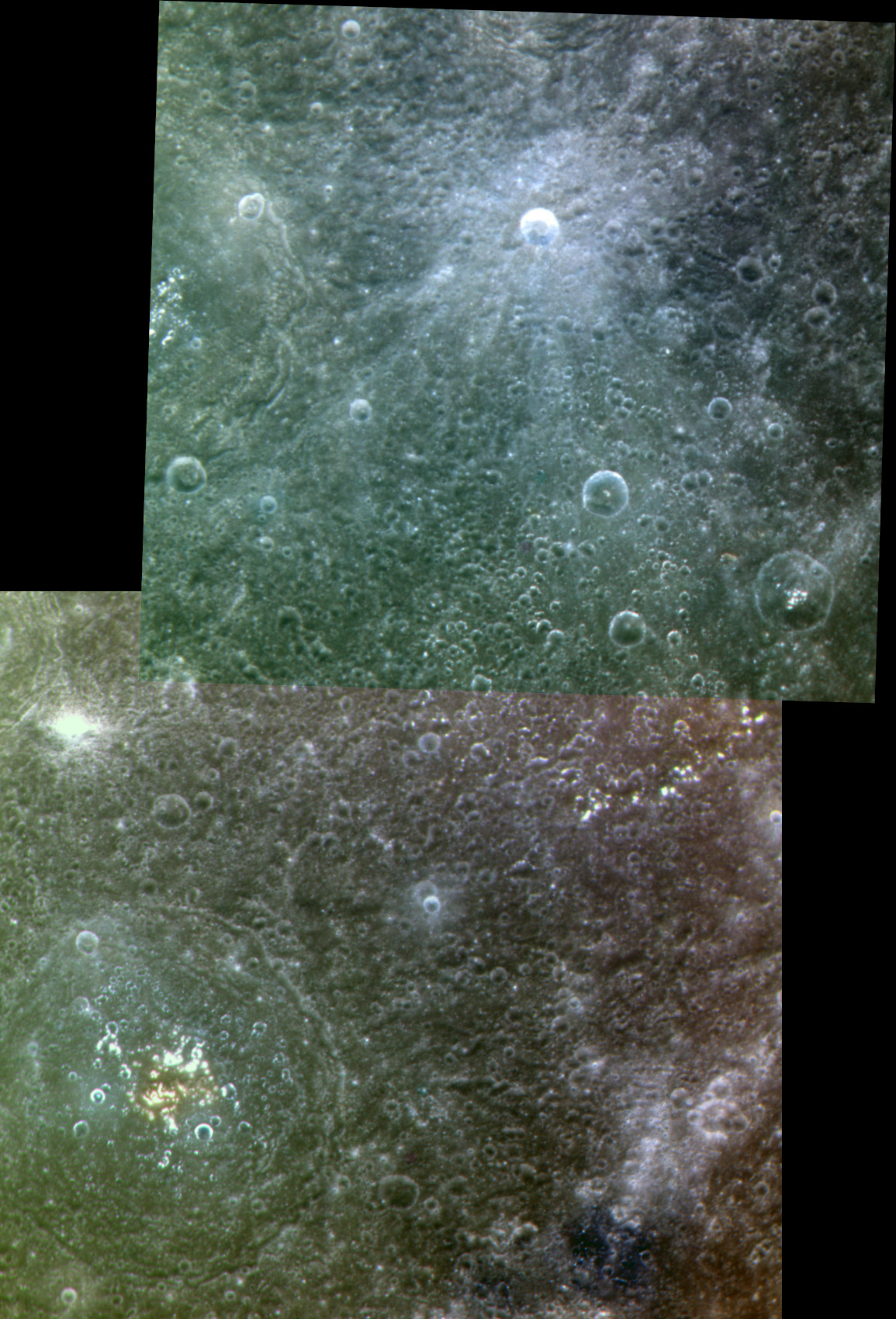
Exaggerated color mosaic showing most of Rodan and Abu Nuwas craters
