= Deborah K. Jones =

American diplomat (born 1956)

Deborah Jones
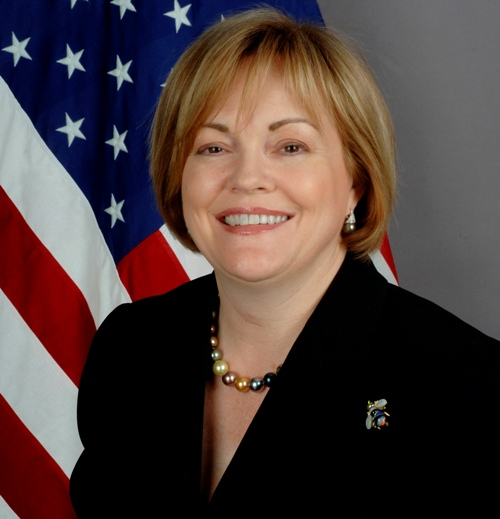
- Official portrait, 2008

11th United States Ambassador to Libya
- In office June 20, 2013 – September 12, 2015
- President: Barack Obama
- Preceded by: Christopher Stevens
- Succeeded by: Peter Bodde

United States Ambassador to Kuwait
- In office April 28, 2008 – June 30, 2011
- President: George W. Bush; Barack Obama
- Preceded by: Richard LeBaron
- Succeeded by: Matthew Tueller

Personal details
- Born: 1956 (age 69–70)
- Spouse: Richard Olson (m. 1990 - div. 2019)
- Education: Brigham Young University; National Defense University

Deborah Kay Jones (born 1956) is an American diplomat and the former United States ambassador to Libya. Prior to her appointment in Libya, she was the United States ambassador to Kuwait from 2008 to 2011.

== Life ==
She has degrees from Brigham Young University and the National Defense University.

She was married to Richard G. Olson, the former U.S. special representative for Afghanistan and Pakistan, and they have two children.

Jones and Olson were investigated by the State Department's Office of Inspector General for failing to report a gift of diamonds worth $60,000 by the emir of Dubai to Jones's mother while Olson was head of the U.S. consulate in Dubai and Jones was leading the State Department's Office of Arabian Affairs in Washington. Jones had also previously served as deputy chief of mission in the United Arab Emirates (of which Dubai is a part). The State Department closed the investigation without taking action after the couple successfully argued that Jones’s mother was not their dependent for tax purposes at the time of the gift, and therefore not covered by the requirements of the Foreign Gifts and Decoration Act. In September 2016 letter, State Department lawyers requested that the couple voluntarily relinquish the diamonds, stating it was “extremely disappointing that you were not sufficiently concerned with the gift to seek guidance from the ethics office.” Jones' mother died in December 2022, and Jones stated to the Washington Post in September 2023 that she did not know what happened to the diamonds.

Jones served as U.S. ambassador to Libya from 2013 to 2015, though this posting became non-residential on July 26, 2014, when the Tripoli embassy was closed and diplomatic activities were moved to the U.S. embassy in Valletta, Malta.

Diplomatic posts
Preceded by Richard LeBaron	United States Ambassador to Kuwait; 2008–2011	Succeeded by Matthew Tueller
Preceded by Christopher Stevens	United States Ambassador to Libya; 2013–2015	Succeeded by Peter Bodde
