= Steven Fagin =

American diplomat

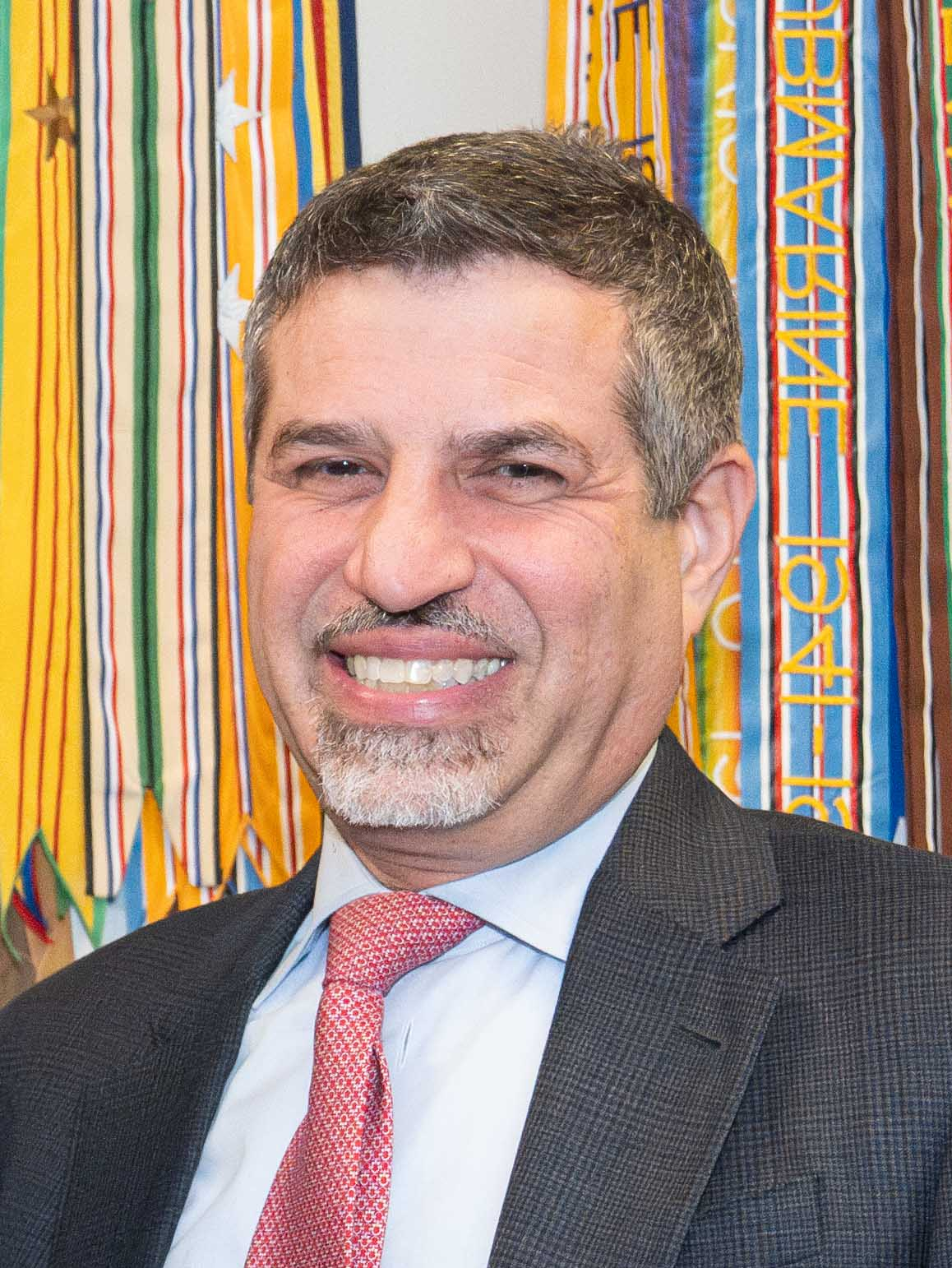
- Steven Fagin at the Pentagon in 2024

United States Ambassador to Yemen
- In office June 1, 2022 – July 3, 2026
- President: Joe Biden; Donald Trump
- Preceded by: Christopher P. Henzel

Personal details
- Born: Steven H. Fagin
- Education: Williams College (BA); University of Michigan (MA)

Steven H. Fagin is an American diplomat who had served as the United States ambassador to Yemen.

== Early life and education ==
Fagin graduated in 1985 from East Brunswick High School and earned a BA from Williams College and his MA from the University of Michigan. He also attended Harvard Law School and was an exchange student at Tbilisi State University in Georgia.

== Career ==
Fagin is a career member of the Senior Foreign Service, with the rank of minister–counselor; he joined in 1997. Early in his career, Fagin was the director of the International Narcotics and Law Enforcement Office at the U.S. embassy in Baghdad, Iraq, the political-economic counselor of the U.S. embassy in Brussels, Belgium and the deputy political counselor of the U.S. embassy in Islamabad, Pakistan. He has also served as the director of the Office of Iranian Affairs in the Bureau of Near Eastern Affairs of the State Department and as the director of the Office of Regional Affairs in the Bureau of South and Central Asian Affairs from September 2013 to April 2015. He later served as acting deputy assistant secretary of state of the bureau from April to August 2015. He previously served as the principal officer at the U.S. consulate general in Erbil, Iraq. He most recently served as the deputy chief of mission of the U.S. embassy in Baghdad, Iraq. Fagin has also held assignments in Kazakhstan, Bosnia and Herzegovina, Belarus, Georgia and Egypt in addition to serving as special assistant to the under secretary of state for political affairs and as the desk officer for Pakistan.

=== Ambassador to Yemen ===
On November 17, 2021, President Joe Biden announced his intent to nominate Fagin to be the next United States ambassador to Yemen. On December 2, 2021, his nomination was sent to the Senate. His nomination ultimately expired at the end of the year and was returned to President Biden on January 3, 2022.

Fagin was subsequently renominated the next day. Hearings on his nomination were held before the Senate Foreign Relations Committee on March 3, 2022. His nomination was favorably reported on March 23, 2022. His nomination was confirmed in the Senate by voice vote on April 7, 2022. He presented his credentials on June 1, 2022.

=== Civil-Military Coordination Center for Gaza ===
On 24 October 2025, the U.S. State Department appointed Steven Fagin as the civilian lead for a new center working to implement the Gaza peace plan and get humanitarian aid into the Palestinian enclave.

== Awards and recognitions ==
During his service, Fagin has received numerous State Department awards as well as a Presidential Meritorious Service Award.

== Personal life ==
Fagin speaks Arabic, Kurdish and Russian.

== See also ==
- Ambassadors of the United States

Diplomatic posts
Preceded by Christopher P. Henzel	United States Ambassador to Yemen; 2022–2026	Vacant
