= Tsʻai Wen-Chi (crater) =

Crater on Mercury

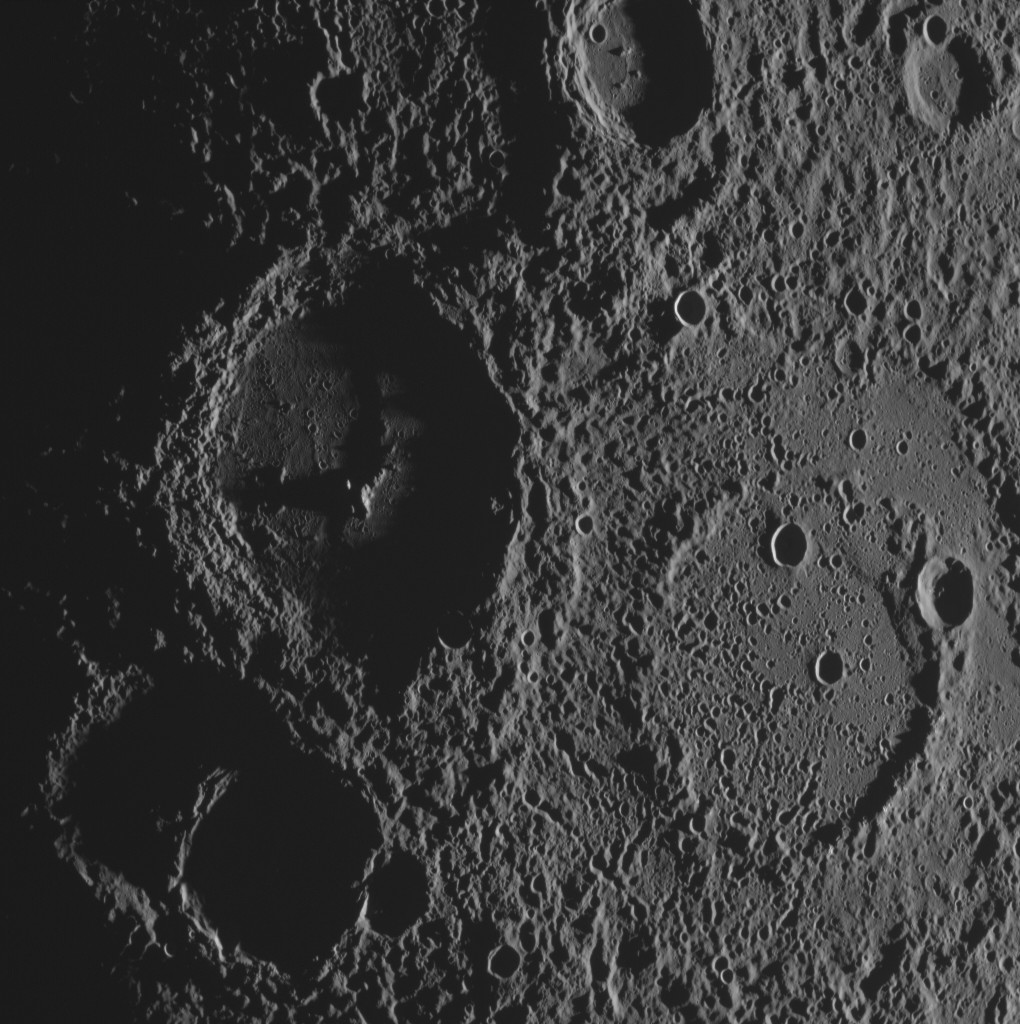
- MESSENGER wide angle camera image of Rodin (right) and Tsʻai Wen-Chi (left)
- Planet: Mercury
- Coordinates: 23.47°N 23.15°W
- Quadrangle: Victoria
- Diameter: 124 km (77 mi)
- Eponym: Cai Yan (Cai Wenji)

Tsʻai Wen-Chi is an impact crater on the planet Mercury. It is located northwest of the larger Rodin crater. It is named for the Chinese composer Cai Yan. Its name was approved by the International Astronomical Union in 1976. The crater was first imaged by Mariner 10 in 1974.

Tsʻai Wen-Chi contains hollows.

== Views ==
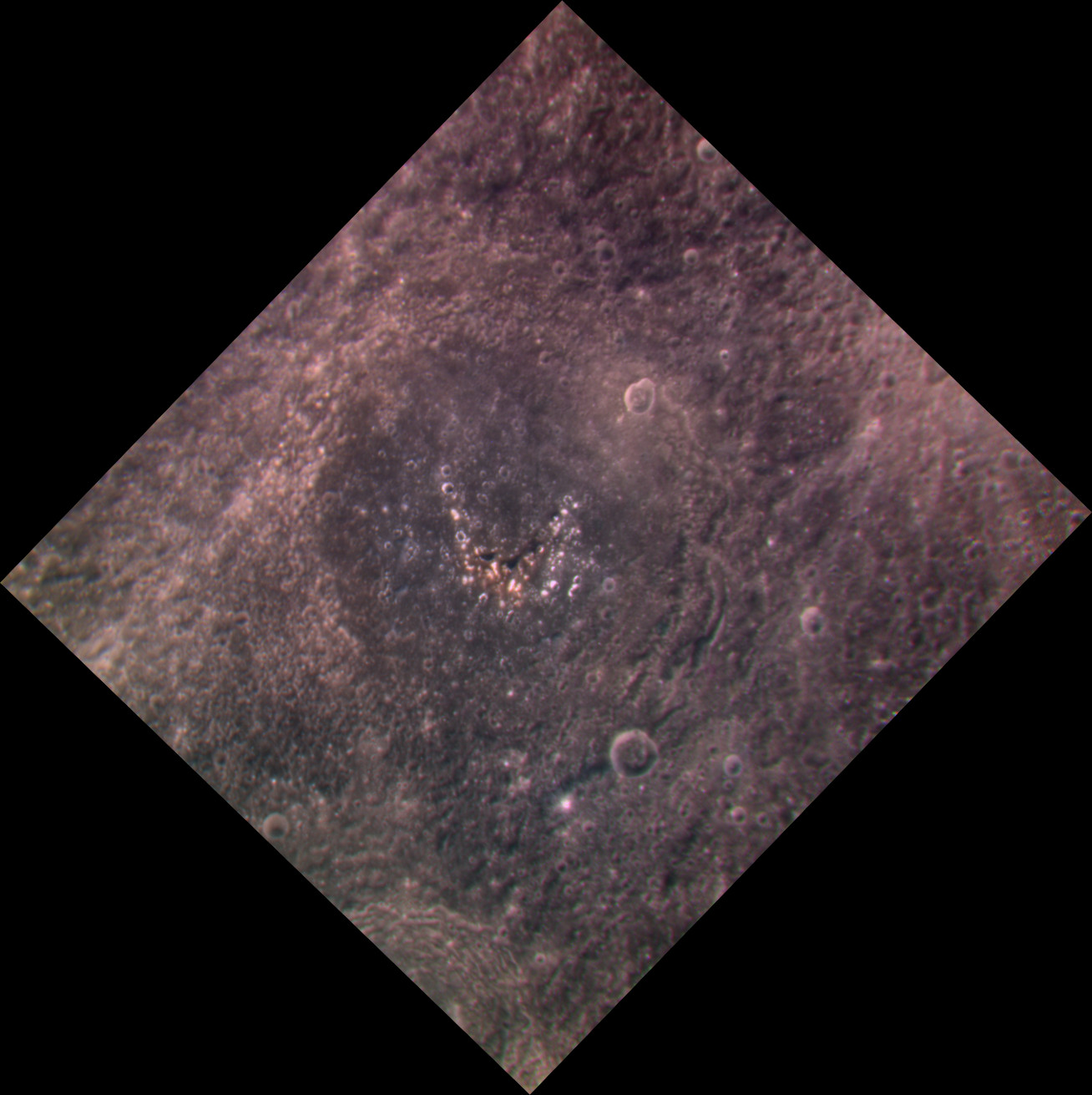
Tsʻai Wen-Chi crater in approximate color

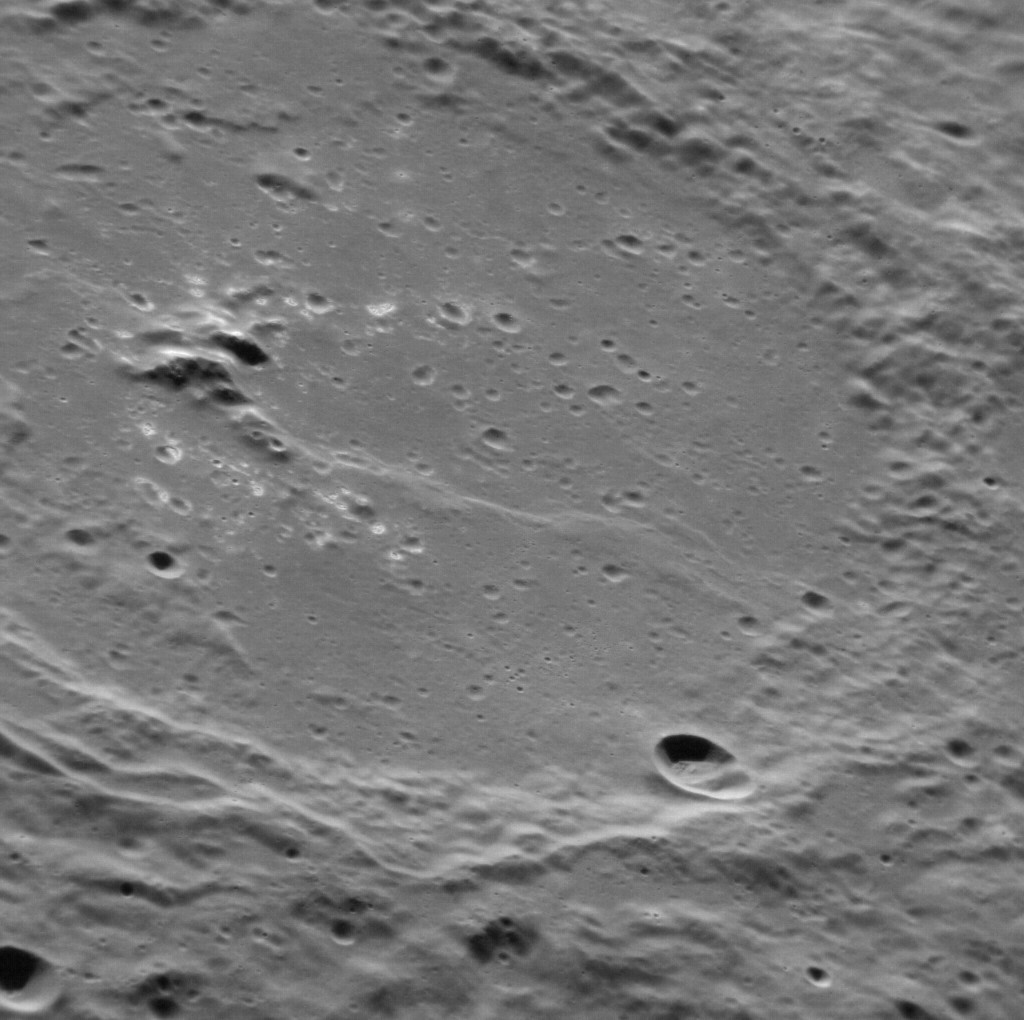
Oblique view of the crater showing some hollows

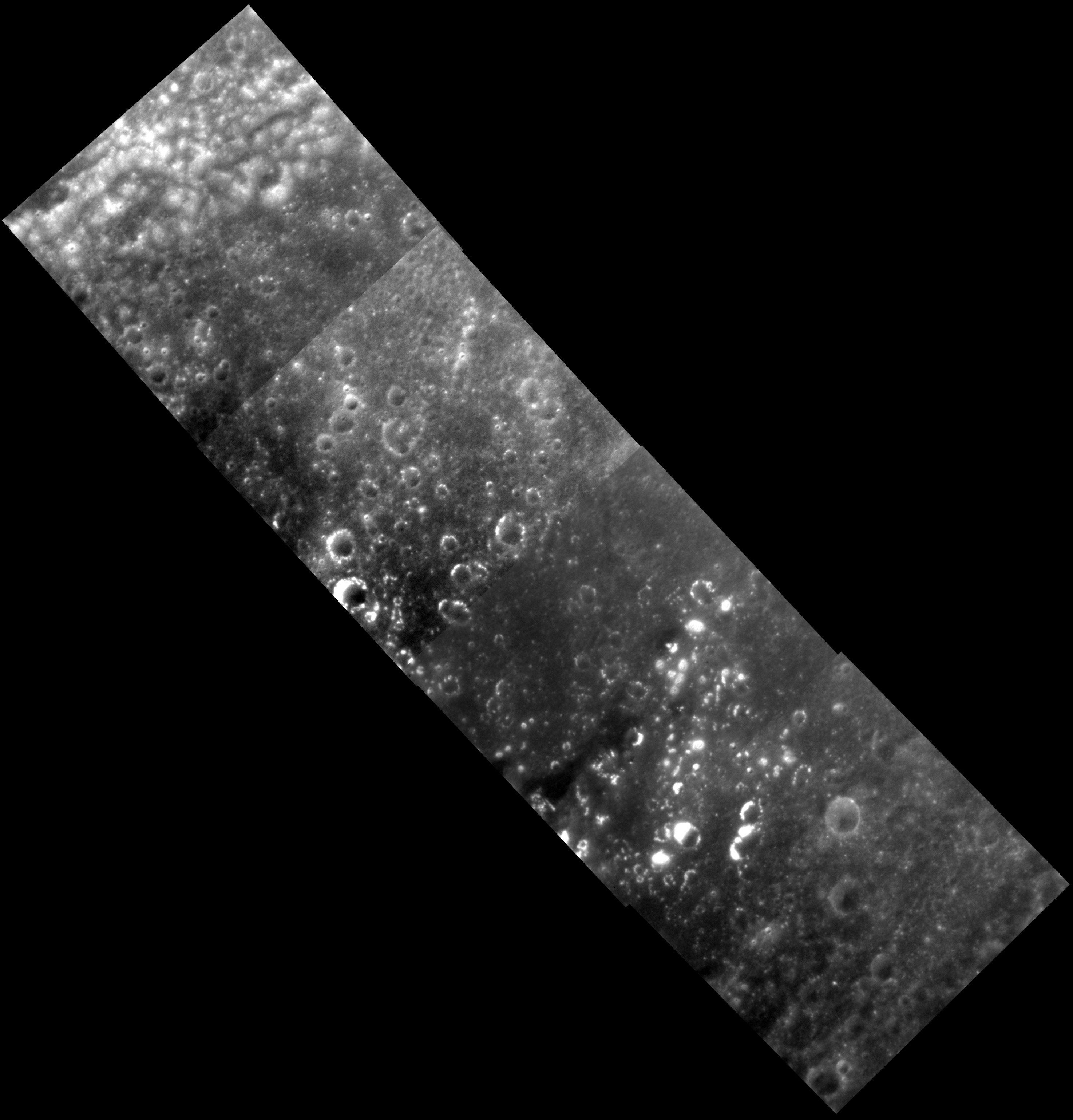
High-resolution mosaic showing bright hollows
