= Peter W. Bodde =

American diplomat (born 1954)

Peter William Bodde
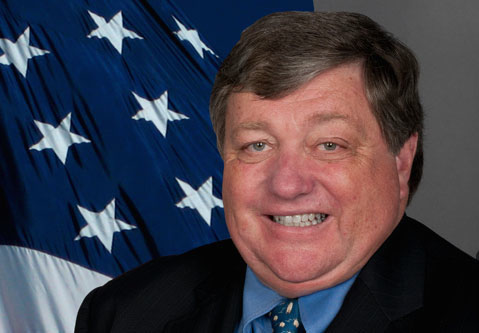

8th United States Ambassador to Libya
- In office January 21, 2016 – December 19, 2017
- President: Barack Obama; Donald Trump
- Preceded by: Deborah K. Jones
- Succeeded by: Richard Norland

23rd United States Ambassador to Nepal
- In office September 10, 2012 – September 15, 2015
- President: Barack Obama
- Preceded by: Scott H. DeLisi
- Succeeded by: Alaina B. Teplitz

18th United States Ambassador to Malawi
- In office October 28, 2008 – August 1, 2010
- President: George W. Bush; Barack Obama
- Preceded by: Alan W. Eastham
- Succeeded by: Jeanine E. Jackson

Personal details
- Born: October 1954 (age 71)
- Spouse: Tanya Lee Will Bodde
- Education: University of Maryland
- Occupation: Diplomat

Peter William Bodde (born October 1954) is a member of the United States Foreign Service, and was the 8th United States Ambassador to Libya. He has previously served as the United States Ambassador to Nepal and as the United States Ambassador to Malawi, during which time he was credited for promoting awareness of HIV/AIDS discrimination.

== Personal life ==
Bodde was born October, 1954 to William and Ingrid Bodde. Bodde's father William was also a member of the foreign service and served as the United States Ambassador to Fiji, Tuvalu and Tonga. Bodde graduated from the University of Maryland in 1976 with his Bachelor of Arts degree in government and politics. After graduating from college Bodde went on to work the United States International Trade Commission as a commodities analyst.

== Career ==
Bodde started his career with the U.S. Foreign Service in 1981. Early in his career Bodde served at the United States Embassy in Nepal. From 1982 to 1984 Bodde served at the United States Embassies in New Delhi as the counselor for Administrative Affairs, in Copenhagen, Sofia and the United States Consulate in Hamburg. From 1994 to 1997 Bodde was assigned to the United States Consulate in Georgetown. In 2002 Bodde was assigned to the United States Consulate in Frankfurt until 2006. In February 2006 he was appointed the Deputy Chief of Mission at the United States Embassy in Islamabad. While assigned to the US Embassy in Islamabad Bodde served as the Coordinator on Minority Issues. Bodde left the embassy in Islamabad in 2008 and was appointed the United States Ambassador to Malawi. Bodde served as the ambassador to Malawi until August, 2010. Bodde was appointed the United States Ambassador to Nepal on July 5, 2012. He was confirmed as the United States Ambassador to Libya on November 19, 2015.

=== Malawi ===
In July 2010, the United States embassy in Malawi announced that the United States Government would be assisting the Malawi Ministry of Health with the construction of a new HIV/AIDS department. The cost was estimated at just over one million dollars (USD), which was funded by the United States. Bodde along with US Global AIDS coordinator Ambassador Eric Goosby, and Malawi Minister of Health Professor Moses Chirambo presided over the dedication ceremony for the facility. While assigned as the ambassador to Malawi Bodde also assisted with the implementation of a five-year 80 million dollar (USD) food security program called Wellness and Agriculture for Life Advancement (WALA). The program's goal was to help secure food resources for mothers and young children in 200,000 households that were deemed chronically food insecure The ambassador also funded a project using US$5100 from the Ambassador's Special Self-Help Fund to bring clean drinking water to Chirombo Village in the Dowa District.

=== Nepal ===
Bodde was nominated for the post of Ambassador to Nepal on March 3, 2012, by President Barack Obama. Bodde was confirmed by the United States Senate in June 2012. He presented his credentials on September 10, 2012, and served until September 15, 2015. In February 2015, Bodde lobbied the Nepali government for the endorsement of an electricity bill that would allow the Nepal Electricity Commission to boost Nepal's use of hydro electric power. In April 2015 Bodde observed the administration of Vitamin A to children of the Kathmandu Valley. Bodde and his staff assisted in distributing the Vitamin A and also educated children on the importance of a healthy diet. The Vitamin A program was started by USAID in the program reaches an estimated 3.2 million children annually. On June 25, 2015, at the International Conference on Nepal's Reconstruction Ambassador Bodde pledged 130 million dollars (USD) in US aid to help with disaster relief efforts from the earthquake.

=== Libya ===
On November 19, 2015, Bodde was confirmed as the United States Ambassador to Libya by the US Senate, On In May 2016, Bodde negotiated the agreement that lead to US troops being stationed in Libya. and he presented his credentials on January 21, 2016. In October 2016, Bodde supervised the disbursement of one million dollars (USD) through the USAID's Office of Foreign Disaster Assistance, to The International Organization for Migration to assist displaced persons in Libya. The money will be used to provide non-food items and hygiene kits to an estimated 1,240 families. In March 2016 Bodde was reported as being the lead in negotiations with the Unity Government in Libya while dealing with ISIS. Bodde conducted discussions with Libya's Prime Minister about the resources that Libya required to combat ISIS. He left his post on December 19, 2017.

Diplomatic posts
Preceded by Alan W. Eastham	United States Ambassador to Malawi; 2008–2010	Succeeded by Jeanine E. Jackson
Preceded by Scott DeLisi	United States Ambassador to Nepal; 2012–2015	Succeeded by Alaina B. Teplitz (as envoy)
Preceded by Deborah K. Jones	United States Ambassador to Libya; 2016–2017	Succeeded by Richard Norland
