= 14th of July Bridge =

Bridge of the 14th July
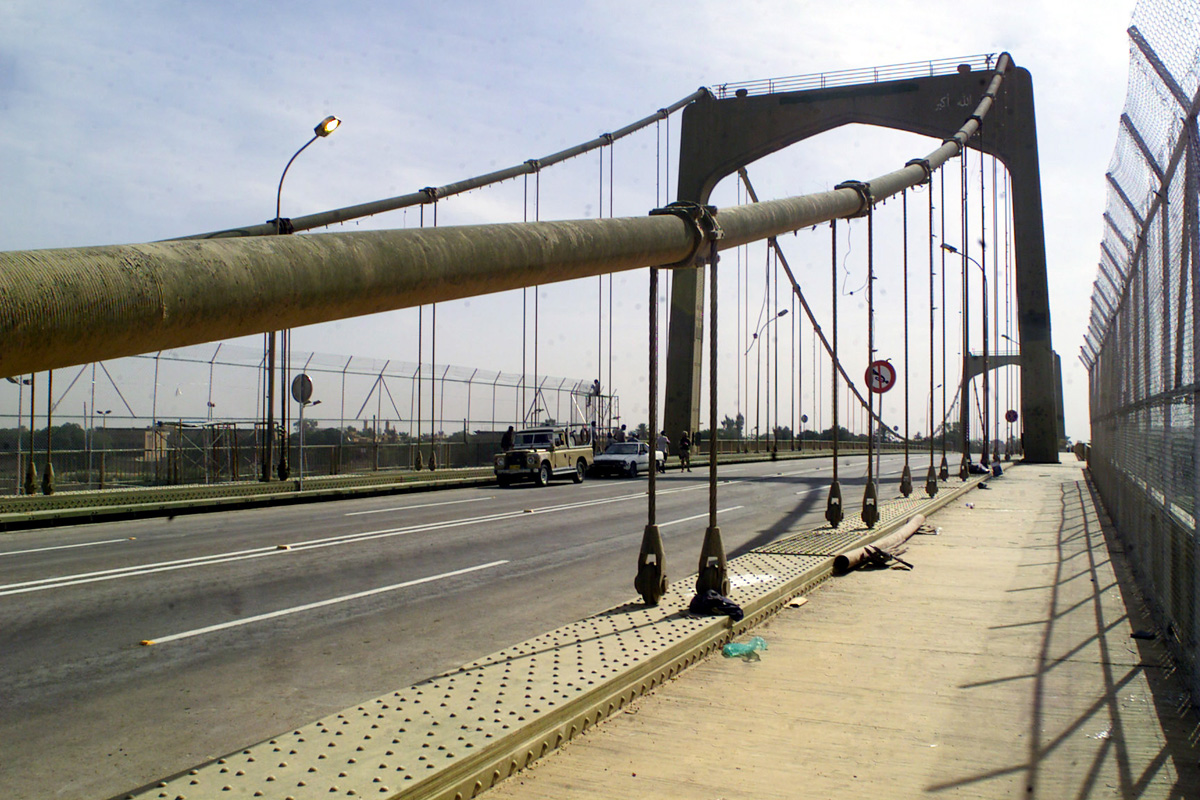
- Coordinates: 33.295669°N 44.399958°E
- Crosses: Tigris
- Official name: Arbataash Tamuz Bridge

Characteristics
- No. of spans: 167.64 m (550.0 ft)

History
- Designer: David B. Steinman
- Construction start: 1961
- Construction end: 1964

Location
- Interactive map of Bridge of the 14th July

The Bridge of the 14th July (Arabic: جسر 14 تموز) is a suspension bridge over the Tigris in Baghdad, Iraq that carries vehicle and pedestrian traffic. The bridge carries Arbataash Tamuz (14th of July) street from the center of the city (formerly the Green Zone) south into the Karrada peninsula.

The bridge is named after July 14, 1958, the day in which the Hashemite monarchy was overthrown in a coup d'état. It is the only suspension bridge in Baghdad.

The bridge has two lanes in each direction, but in practice only one lane is used because of the strict security checks.

The suspension bridge has a span of 167.64 m (550 ft), of which the lateral openings are 83.82 m (275 ft) wide. Since the ground of Baghdad consists of alluvium, the anchor of the ropes does not provide enough support in order to withstand the tensile forces, so the bridge is a so-called self-anchored (spurious) suspension bridge.

David B. Steinman was awarded the contract for designing the bridge in 1956, however the bridge was unable to start construction until 1961, due to the political circumstances in Iraq and the fact that Steinman died in 1960. The bridge is painted in the shade of green which Steinman preferred.

In the Gulf War the bridge was attacked on 9 February 1991 during Operation Desert Storm, which killed three and injured six, causing large-scale damage to the bridge. Actually some sections fallen into the Tigris river. The bridge was re-opened during the 1990s after completing repairs (not on 25 October 2003 after the fall of Saddam Hussein). However, following a bombing in Baghdad on 13 November 2003, it was closed until the middle of 2004 for safety reasons.
