= Douglas Silliman =

American diplomat

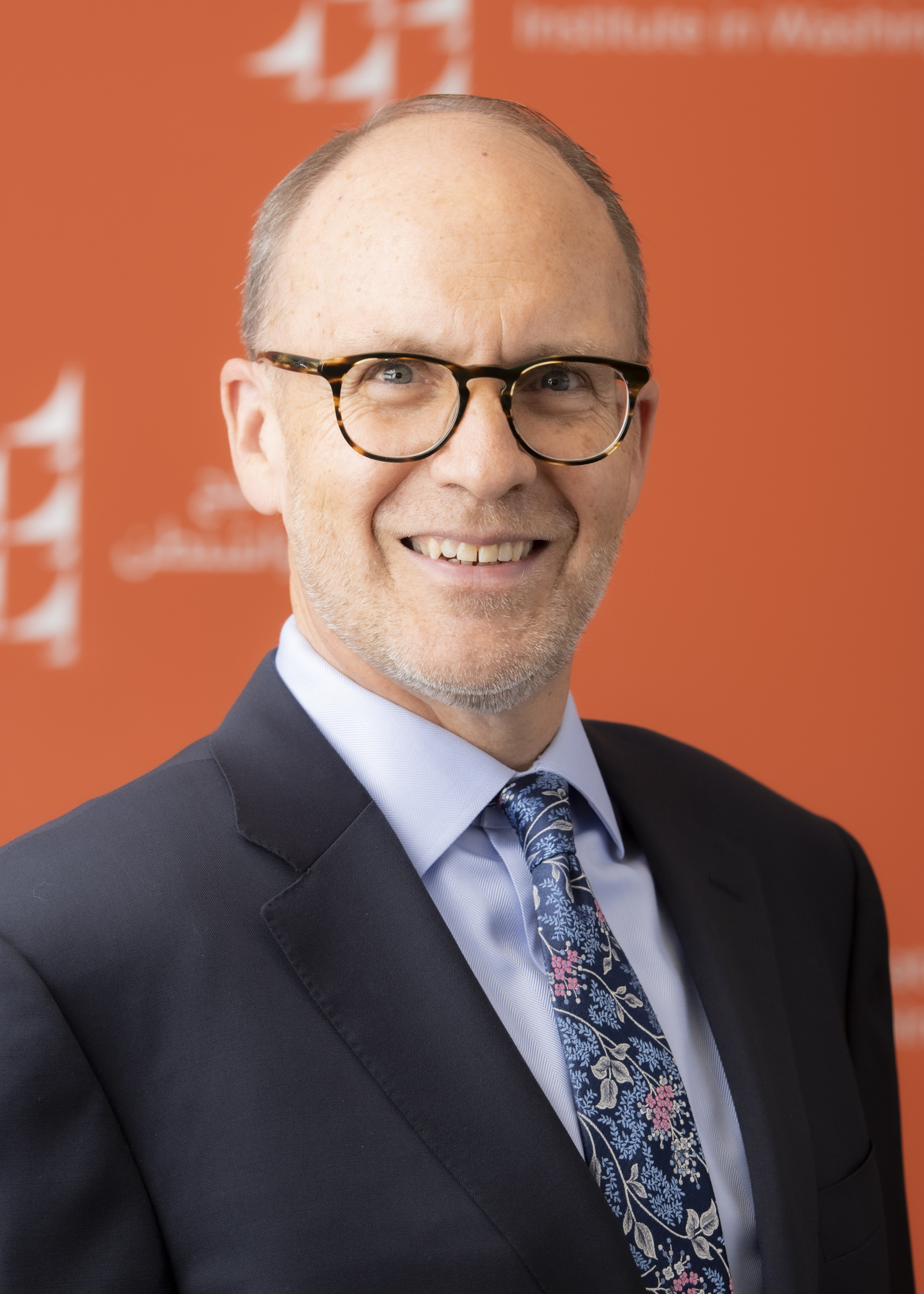

Douglas Alan Silliman (born 1960) is the president of the Arab Gulf States Institute in Washington and a former American diplomat who served as United States Ambassador to Kuwait (2014–16) and Iraq (2016–19).

== Early life and education ==
Silliman was born in Castro Valley, California. At age 11, his family moved to the Houston, Texas area, where Silliman attended high school. He graduated summa cum laude from Baylor University in 1982, with a bachelor's degree in political science and foreign service, and he is a member of Phi Beta Kappa. He studied Russian and traveled as part of a university group to Central Asia and the Caucasus. Silliman then went on to earn a master's degree in international relations from the George Washington University. His graduate thesis covered the concept and execution of Soviet city planning.

== Career ==
Silliman joined the State Department as a Foreign Service officer in April 1984.

Following his Senate confirmation, Silliman arrived as ambassador to Kuwait on September 15, 2014. As ambassador, he led U.S. efforts to commemorate the 25th anniversary of the liberation of Kuwait and expand trade and investment between the United States and Kuwait.

Obama then nominated Silliman ambassador to Iraq. He was confirmed by the Senate in July 2016 and arrived in Baghdad on September 1, 2016. He worked closely with the U.S. military’s Combined Joint Task Force – Operation Inherent Resolve, the international coalition to counter the Islamic State in Iraq and the Levant, Iraqi Prime Minister Haider al-Abadi, and the Iraqi military to coordinate the prosecution of the war against ISIL. Silliman also played a prominent role with the United Nations and other Western donors to provide humanitarian assistance to Iraqis displaced by war and assure demining and stabilization efforts so that displaced Iraqis could return to their homes. After ISIL was pushed out of Iraq, he played a crucial role in implementing the policy the administration of President Donald J. Trump of focusing assistance on the Yazidi and Christian communities that had been targeted by ISIL, aiming to limit Iranian activities in the region, defeat ISIL in Syria, and help U.S. companies conduct business in Iraq. He received the Presidential Distinguished Service Award from President Trump in 2018 for his service in Iraq. Silliman departed Baghdad in January 2019 and retired from the Foreign Service that April.

In June 2019, Silliman was named president of the Arab Gulf States Institute in Washington, a D.C.-based research institution focused on the Gulf Arab state and key neighboring countries. Following the January 2020 U.S. drone strike that killed Iranian Quds Force leader Qassim Suleimani and Iraqi militia leader Abu Mahdi al-Muhandis at Baghdad International Airport, Silliman was a frequent commentator on domestic and international media where he argued for de-escalation of tensions between the United States and Iran and a clearer articulation of U.S. foreign policy goals in the region.

Silliman married Catherine Raia Silliman in 1990, and they have two adult children. He currently resides in the Washington, D.C. metro area.
