= Jacques Paul Klein =

American diplomat

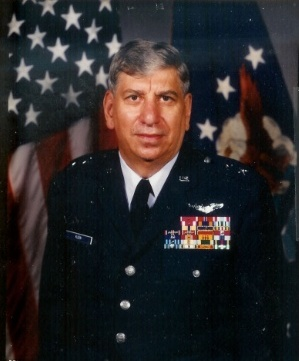
Major General Klein

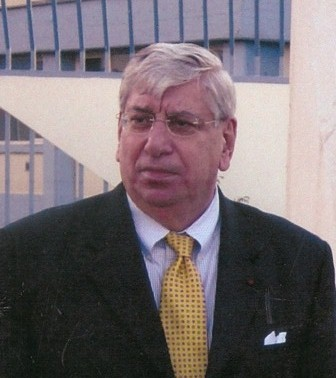
Jacques Paul Klein, Under-Secretary-General of the United Nations

Jacques Paul Klein is a retired United States diplomat, who served as head of three United Nations peacekeeping missions: the United Nations Transitional Administration for Eastern Slavonia (UNTAES) from January 17, 1996, to August 1, 1997, the United Nations Mission in Bosnia and Herzegovina (UNMIBH) from July 16, 1999, to December 31, 2002, and the United Nations Mission in Liberia (UNMIL) from July 17, 2003, to July 20, 2005.

== Background ==
Jacques Paul Klein was born on 9 January 1939 in Sélestat, Alsace, France, the son of Jean Paul Klein and Josephine Klein (née Wolff). In the Middle Ages the seat of the Klein family was located in Wuille (Ville) in the Vosges Mountains. Barthel Klein and his descendants were mayors, municipal magistrates and city counselors in Ville. In 1695, after the Thirty Years' War, Jean Klein married Catherine Bleicher from nearby St. Hippolyte (St.Pilt) and after their marriage moved the family there, They became vintners after arriving in St. Hippolyte and have practiced viniculture since that time. After five years of Nazi occupation and the death of Klein's father; and the destruction of the family home and business at the end of World War II, his mother opted to move to the United States with her seven-year-old son, arriving on December 7, 1946. Prior to leaving France, Klein had begun his elementary school studies at College Koeberle in Selestat.

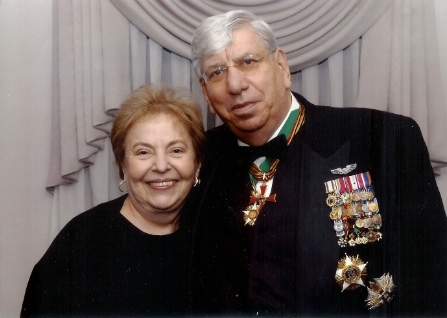
Klein and his wife Margrete (Gretchen) Siebert Klein

In August, 1968, Klein married Dr. Margrete (Gretchen) Siebert Klein. She holds a Bachelor of Science degree in mathematics from Baldwin Wallace University in Berea, Ohio, a Master of Science degree in physics from the University of Michigan, and a Ph.D. in science education from Northwestern University in Evanston, Illinois. She pursued a professional career as a college instructor and subsequently served as a staff associate in the Division of Physics and as a program director at the National Science Foundation in Washington, D.C. They have two children, Christian and Maia, and four grandchildren, Nikolas, Sophia, Caroline and Courtenay.

Klein was a career member of the Senior Foreign Service of the Department of State. He received his undergraduate and graduate degrees in history from Roosevelt University in Chicago, Illinois, and has done postgraduate work in international politics at the Catholic University of America in Washington, D.C. In recognition of his service to peace, he was awarded the Honorary Degree of Doctor of Laws by Elmhurst University and the Honorary Degree of Doctor of Humane Letters, Honoris Causa from Roosevelt University. In 1997 he was presented with a Certificate of Appreciation and the Seal of the City of Osijek and in 1998 the Carter of Gratitude by the president of Croatia. In 2003 he was named an Honorary Citizen of the City of Vukovar. In recognition of his commitment to international understanding and reconciliation, he was presented the Marcel Rudloff Prize at the Court of Human Rights in Strasbourg for "service de la defense de l'esprit de tolerance". In 2011 he was awarded the Degree of Doctor Honori Causa by the Josip Juraj Strossmayer University and Certificate of Gratitude by the Association of Returnees of Croatia and the Distinguished Global Leadership Award by the Evandeoski Teoloski Fakultet in Osijek, Croatia, "for being a transformational leader who demonstrated clarity of vision, moral conviction and the political will while championing human rights and the development of democracy in Croatia, Bosnia Herzegovina and Liberia". In 2013 he was made an Honorary Citizen of the City of Osijek and in 2019 was awarded the Gold medal of Honor of the l'Union Alsacienne; awarded the Foreign Service Cup by DACOR; and made a member of the Comite d'Honneur of the Academie d'Alsace des Sciences, Lettres et Arts.

== Work history ==
=== Air Force ===
Klein completed the extension programs of the Industrial College of the Armed Forces, Air War College, Air Command and Staff College, and Squadron Officer School. He completed the National War College, in residence, in 1980, the National Security Management Course of the National Defense University in 1988, and the Program for Senior Executives in National and International Security, John F. Kennedy School of Government at Harvard University, in 1989.

Klein was commissioned through Officer Training School, Lackland Air Force Base, Texas, in August 1963, and was assigned to the 366th Tactical Fighter Wing, Holloman Air Force Base, New Mexico, as deputy director of personnel, and subsequently served as chief of the Quality and Career Control Branches. In 1965, Klein volunteered for service in South Vietnam and was assigned to Nha Trang Air Base to help activate the 14th Air Commando Wing. During that assignment, he earned his officer non-rated aircrew member wings flying intelligence, strike and reconnaissance missions in 0-1 Es with the 21st Tactical Air Support Squadron. While in Vietnam, he was selected for assignment to the 1005th Special Investigations Group. In 1966, he completed basic intelligence and specialized counterintelligence training in Washington, D.C., before being assigned as Deputy Chief of the Counterintelligence Division, Office of Special Investigations, District 2, in New York City.

In January 1968, upon release from active duty to resume graduate studies, Klein accepted a reserve assignment with the Office of Special Investigations, District 24 in Chicago, Illinois. In 1969, he was asked to assume a civilian position as Chief of the Counterintelligence Division. This appointment necessitated his reassignment as an intelligence officer to the 1127th field Activities Group, Fort Belvoir, Virginia. From 1969 to 1974, Klein served with Intelligence Reserve Detachments 8, 11, and 21 in Illinois and Virginia before being assigned to the newly activated 7602nd Air Intelligence group at Fort Belvoir, Virginia.

In 1975, Klein activated Intelligence Reserve Detachment 23 at Ramstein Air Base, Federal Republic of Germany, and served as intelligence director and executive officer before assuming command in 1977. Upon graduation from the National War College in 1980, he became commander of Intelligence Reserve Detachment 19, Arlington Hall Station, Virginia, while concurrently serving as the first Air Reserve attache to the Federal Republic of Germany and, subsequently, to France. In June 1982, he was assigned as mobilization assistant to the chief, Policy and Management Division, Directorate of International Programs, Air Staff. He was recalled to the intelligence career field in May 1983 as mobilization assistant to the deputy assistant chief of staff for intelligence at Air Force headquarters.

In March 1987, Klein was reassigned as mobilization assistant to the deputy chief of staff, program and resources. He returned to the intelligence career field in September 1989 to serve as mobilization assistant to the assistant chief of staff for intelligence. In April 1990, he was selected to serve as mobilization assistant to the commander of Air University. In January 1991, Klein was recalled to active duty for a short period of time during the Gulf War and retired to civilian life at the end of the conflict. He retired from the Air Force in August 1998, with 35 years, 2 months and 28 days service.

=== Foreign service ===
Ambassador Klein was a career member of the Senior Foreign service of the United States with the rank of minister counselor. He served seven diplomatic postings abroad and three tours in the Department of State.

Klein took the Department of State Foreign Service Examination in June 1969 and entered the Foreign Service in 1971. He served his initial tour of duty in the operations center of the executive secretariat, Office of the Secretary of State. He was subsequently posted abroad to serve as consular officer at the American consulate general in Bremen, Federal Republic of Germany. In 1973, he was reassigned to the Department of State as a political officer in the Office of Southern European Affairs. He returned overseas in 1975 upon assumption of diplomatic relations with the German Democratic Republic, to serve as consular officer in the newly opened American embassy in Berlin. In 1977, he was reassigned and served a follow-on tour as a political officer at the American embassy in Bonn.

Klein was selected to attend the National War College in 1979. After graduation, he was assigned as a management analysis officer on the Policy Planning Staff in the Office of the Director General of the Foreign Service. He was seconded to the United States Department of Defense in 1982 to serve as senior adviser for international affairs to the Secretary of the Air Force, with the rank of deputy assistant secretary. He then returned to the Department of State to become director of the Office of Strategic Technology Matters in the Bureau of Politico-Military Affairs. In 1989, he was again recalled to the Department of Defense to serve as assistant deputy under-secretary of the Air Force for international affairs.

In 1990, Klein returned to the Department of State to serve as principal adviser to the director general of the Foreign Service, and director of personnel for career development, training and detail assignments. In 1993 he was again posted abroad, to serve as political adviser to the commander-in-chief of the United States European Command in Stuttgart, Germany.

=== United Nations and international organizations ===
In 1996, United Nations Secretary-General Boutros Boutros-Ghali selected Klein to serve as transitional administrator for Eastern Slavonia, Baranja and Western Sirmium (UNTAES), with the rank of Under-Secretary-General. As Chief of Mission, he had overall command and control responsibilities and day-to-day management authority of a multinational force of 5,000 military personnel, 350 international civilian police officers, 100 multi-national military observers, 300 international civil servants and a local national staff of 600. He administered a $370 million budget and, through skillful management, reduced actual expenditures by over $20 million per year.

During the period 1998–2001, Klein served as Principal Deputy High Representative, in the Office of the High Representative, with the rank of ambassador-at-large, in the senior international organization established by the Dayton Peace Accords. He had overall authority and day-to-day management responsibility of the Office of the High Representative (OHR). The OHR was composed of 436 diplomats and international civil servants from 22 countries with an annual budget of 32 million euros.

From 2001 through 2003, Klein served as United Nations special representative, of the secretary general and the coordinator of the fifteen United Nations Agencies in Bosnia and Herzegovina (BiH), with the rank of Under-Secretary-General. As chief of mission, he had overall management authority and day-to-day management responsibility of 2,700 international police officers from 46 countries, 432 international diplomats and civil servants from 95 countries, and a local national staff of 1,400 members assigned to Sarajevo and seven regional offices in the country with a budget of $168.2 million.

From 2003 through mid-2005, Klein served as the Special Representative of the Secretary-General and Coordinator of International Operations in Liberia. He established the largest United Nations Mission in the world, consisting of 15,000 military personnel, 1,115 international police officers, 215 military observers, 695 international diplomats and civil servants, 500 United Nations volunteers and 800 local staff with a budget of $800 million. Klein was tasked with reintegrating and rehabilitating ex-combatants and holding the first democratic elections in a quarter of a century.

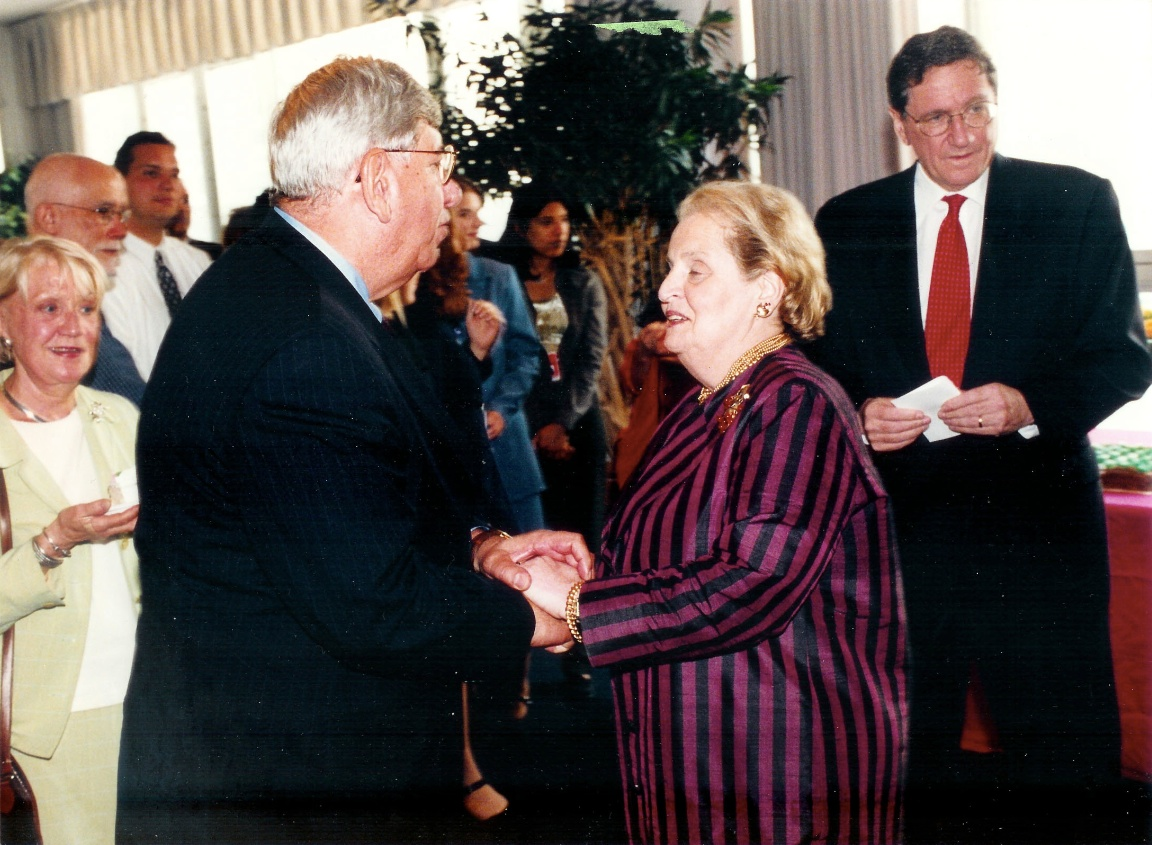
Klein, Madeleine Albright and Richard Holbrooke at the US Mission to the United Nations

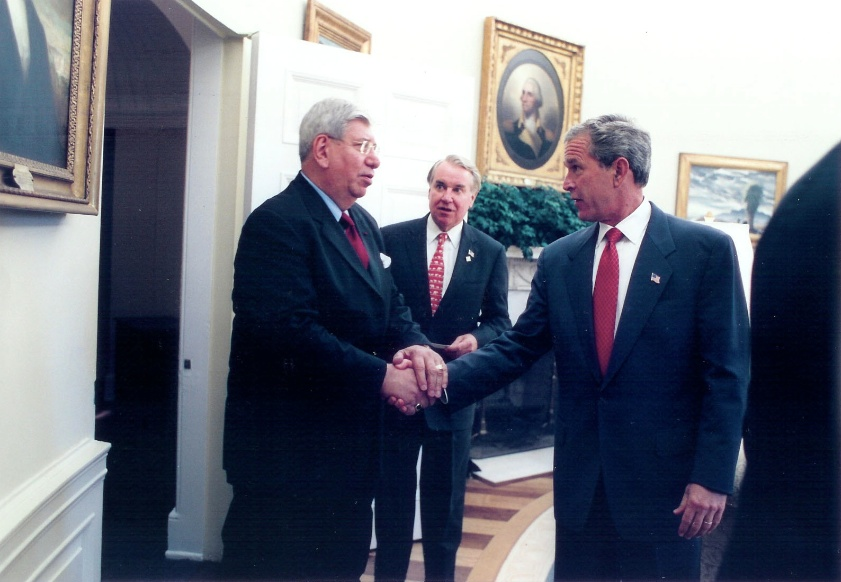
Klein and President George W. Bush

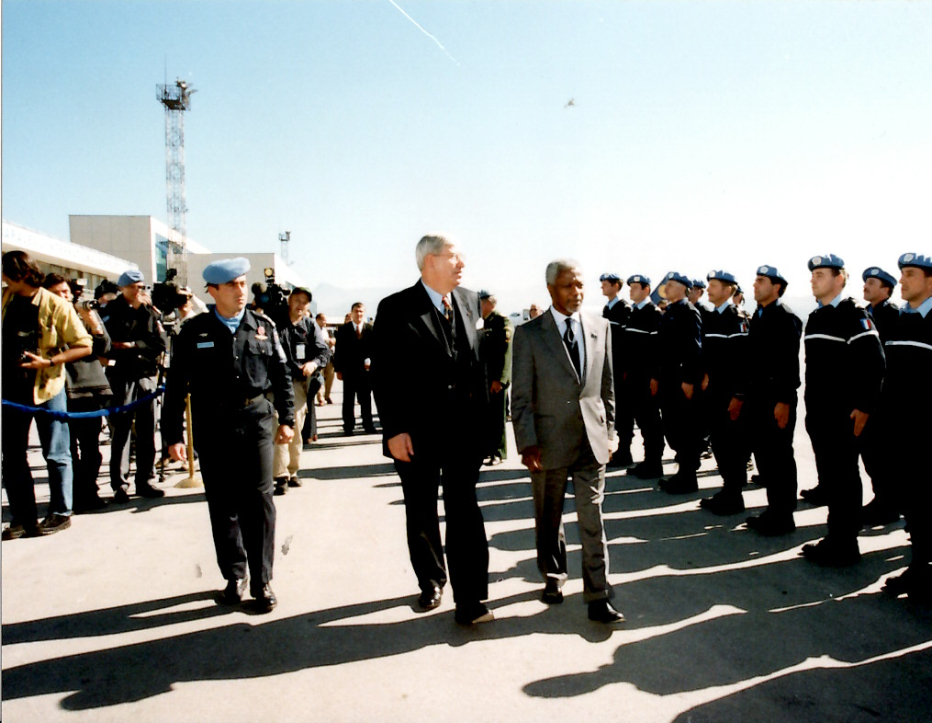
United Nations Secretary-General Kofi Annan meets with SRSG Klein at the Sarajevo Airport in 2002

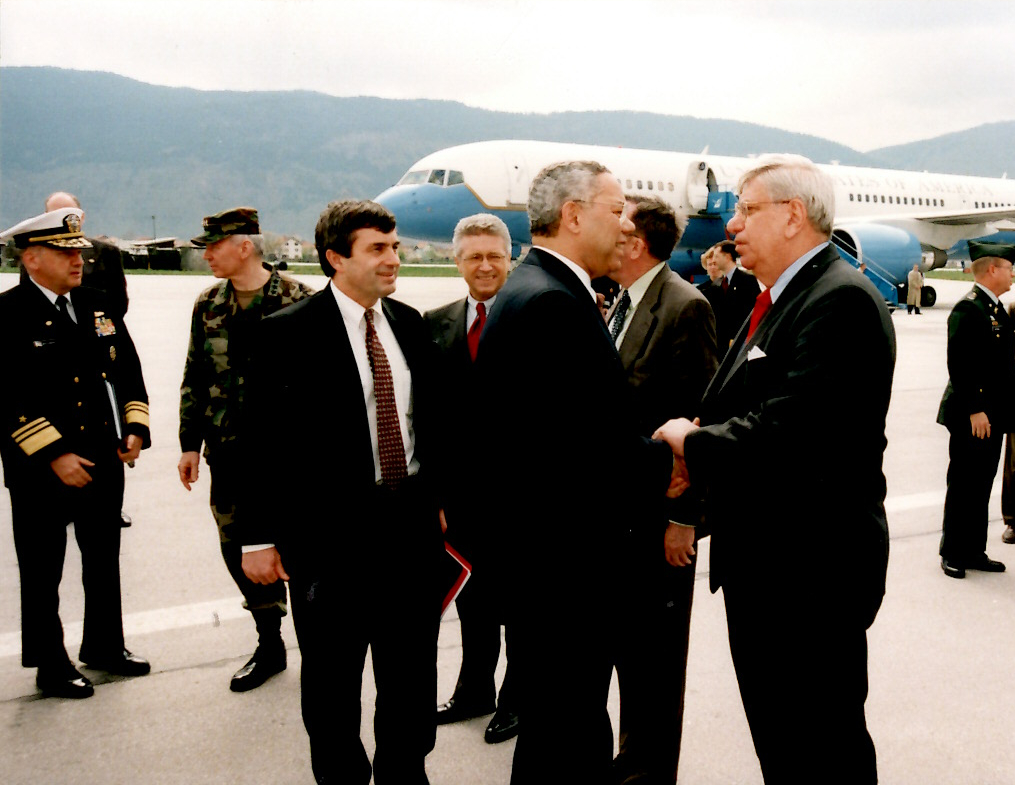
U.S. Secretary of State Colin Powell meets with SRSG Klein at the Sarajevo Airport in 2002

Klein's tenure at the United Nations was marred by a series of allegations, accusations and hearsay that had no basis in fact; which was fueled by Liberia's three warring factions in an attempt to discredit him and the United Nations. The United Nations OIOS investigation was deemed inadequate and releasing the report ran counter to the United Nations mandate.

In a subsequent ruling the United Nations Dispute Tribunal in Case No. UNDT/NY/2009/119, the court found that Klein should be compensated with US$60,000 due to Ban Ki-moon's release of the flawed investigation report.

== Post-UN career ==
During the 2005–2006 academic year, Klein held the position of visiting lecturer in international affairs and Schultz Visiting Professor of Public and International Affairs at Princeton University's School of Public and International Affairs. He was responsible for the development and presentation of undergraduate and graduate courses that examine the history of conflict management and resolution. Topics included humanitarian crisis management, United Nations peacekeeping operations and American foreign policy objectives, the role of United Nations peacekeeping in the post Cold War era, the role of the Security Council in United Nations decision-making processes, the changing face of peacekeeping and peace enforcement, and the role and interest of the United States in United Nations reform.

Klein continues to lecture, write, and consult on international affairs and serves as an adjunct professor of international relations at the International University of Dubrovnik in Croatia and serves on the advisory board of the University of Public and Individual Security "Apeiron" in Cracow, Poland.

Ambassador Klein is a member of the Comite d'Honneur of the Academie d'Alsace, the Council on Foreign Relations, the American Academy of Diplomacy, DACOR, the Washington Institute of Foreign Affairs, as well as the COMOS Club, the Army and Navy club of Washington, D.C., the Princeton Club of New York City and MENSA.

=== Air Force promotion history ===
Rank	Date
Major general	August 12, 1992
Brigadier general	April 8, 1987
Colonel	July 1, 1981
Lieutenant colonel	September 21, 1977
Major	May 1, 1973
Captain	March 22, 1967
First lieutenant	February 6, 1965
Second lieutenant	August 6, 1963

=== Foreign service promotion history ===
Grade	Date
Personal Rank of Ambassador	1998
Minister Counselor (FE-MC)	1998
Counselor (FE-OC)	1991
FSO-01	1984
FSO-02	1981
FSO-04	1980
FSO-05	1975
FSO-06	1973
FSO-07	1971

Department of State awards
State Department Secretary's Career Achievement Award
State Department Secretary's Distinguished Service Award
State Department Superior Honor Award (with two leaf clusters)
State Department Meritorious Honor Award (with two oak leaf clusters)

Other civilian awards
Presidential Meritorious Service Award
Secretary of Defense Outstanding Public Service Award
Department of the Air Force Award for Exceptional civilian Service
Department of the Air Force Award for Meritorious Civilian Service
Central Intelligence Agency Seal Medallion
Air National Guard Meritorious Service Award

Foreign civilian awards
Grand Officer of the Order of the Crown Belgium
Grand Order of King Dmitar Zvonimir Croatia
Order of the Lion in Grade of Commander Senegal
Officer of the Legion d'Honneur France
Grand Commander of the Liberian Humane Order of African Redemption Liberia
Republic of Slovakia Peacekeeping Medal First Class Slovakia
The Great Cross of Merit of the Federal Republic of Germany Germany
Officer's Cross of the Order of Merit of the Republic of Poland
Medal of Merit and Peace-building of UN VETERAN SLOVAKIA - Golden Degree

U.S. badges
U.S. Air Force Non-Rated Officer Aircrew Member Badge
U.S. Air Force Master Intelligence Badge

U.S. Military decorations
U.S. Air Force Distinguished Service Medal
U.S. Department of Defense Defense Superior Service Medal
U.S. Armed Forces Legion of Merit (with oak leaf cluster)
U.S. Department of Defense Bronze Star
U.S. Department of Defense Defense Meritorious Service Medal (with oak leaf cluster)
U.S. Air Force Meritorious Service Medal (with oak leaf cluster)
U.S. Department of Defense Air Medal
U.S. Department of Defense Joint Service Commendation Medal
U.S Air Force Commendation Medal

U.S. unit awards
U.S. Air Force Presidential Unit Citation (with oak leaf cluster)
U.S. Department of Defense Joint Meritorious Unit Award (with oak leaf cluster)
U.S. Army Meritorious Unit Commendation
U.S. Air Force Outstanding Unit Award (with four oak leaf clusters)
U.S. Air Force Organizational Excellence Award (with one silver and two oak leaf clusters)
NOAA Corps National Aeronautical and Atmospheric Unit Citation

U.S. service (campaign) medals and service training ribbons
U.S. Department of Defense National Defense Service Medal (with one bronze service star)
U.S. Department of Defense Vietnam Service Medal (with three bronze service stars)
U.S. Air Force Overseas Short Tour Ribbon
U.S. Air Force Longevity Service Award (with one silver and two oak leaf clusters)
U.S. Armed Forces Armed Forces Reserve Medal (with gold hour glass device and bronze letter M)
U.S. Air Force Small Arms Expert Marksmanship Ribbon
U.S. Air Force Air Force Training Ribbon

Foreign military awards and decorations
Order of Aeronautical Merit (Brazil) (in the grade of commander)
Republic of Korea Presidential Unit Citation Korea
Republic of Vietnam Gallantry Cross (Unit Citation) Vietnam
Republic of Vietnam Campaign Medal Vietnam
Commemorative Medal of Chief of the General Staff of the Slovak Armed Forces

United Nations missions
UNTAES United Nations Mission in Eastern Slavonia
UNMiBH United Nations Mission in Bosnia and Herzegovina
UNMIL United Nations Mission in Liberia

== Sources ==
- Headquarters Joint Appeals Board (JAB,) Case No. 2008-062 28 May 2009 and JAB Report No.270
- MilitaryMedia.org: Jacques Paul Klein
- Military Times Hall of Valor: Jaques Paul Klein
- Roosevelt University Notable Alumni: Jacques Paul Klein
- American Academy of Diplomacy
- af.mil Jacques P. Klein
- Congressional Record, 6/11/2003, Vol. 149 No. 85, Senator John Warner
