= Ryan Crocker =

American diplomat (born 1949)

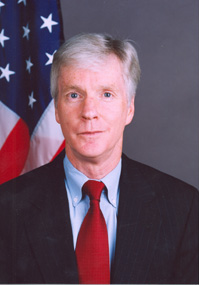

Member of the International Broadcasting Advisory Board
- In office August 1, 2013 – June 8, 2020
- President: Barack Obama; Donald Trump; Joe Biden
- Preceded by: Victor Ashe

19th United States Ambassador to Afghanistan
- In office July 25, 2011 – July 23, 2012
- President: Barack Obama
- Preceded by: Karl Eikenberry
- Succeeded by: James B. Cunningham
- Acting; January 2, 2002 – April 3, 2002
- President: George W. Bush
- Preceded by: James Dobbins (acting)
- Succeeded by: Robert Finn

United States Ambassador to Iraq
- In office March 31, 2007 – February 13, 2009
- President: George W. Bush; Barack Obama
- Preceded by: Zalmay Khalilzad
- Succeeded by: Christopher R. Hill

United States Ambassador to Pakistan
- In office November 25, 2004 – March 28, 2007
- President: George W. Bush
- Preceded by: Nancy Jo Powell
- Succeeded by: Anne W. Patterson

United States Ambassador to Syria
- In office June 6, 1999 – June 30, 2001
- President: Bill Clinton; George W. Bush
- Preceded by: Christopher W.S. Ross
- Succeeded by: Theodore H. Kattouf

United States Ambassador to Kuwait
- In office September 7, 1994 – December 4, 1997
- President: Bill Clinton
- Preceded by: Edward Gnehm
- Succeeded by: James Larocco

United States Ambassador to Lebanon
- In office November 29, 1990 – August 14, 1993
- President: George H. W. Bush; Bill Clinton
- Preceded by: John Thomas McCarthy
- Succeeded by: Mark Gregory Hambley

Personal details
- Born: Ryan Clark Crocker; June 19, 1949 (age 77) Spokane, Washington, U.S.
- Spouse: Christine Barnes (deceased)
- Children: 0
- Education: Whitman College (BA)
- Awards: Presidential Medal of Freedom; Sylvanus Thayer Award; Hilal-e-Pakistan

Ryan Clark Crocker (born June 19, 1949) is a retired American diplomat who served as a career ambassador within the United States Foreign Service. A recipient of the Presidential Medal of Freedom, he served as United States ambassador to Afghanistan (2011–2012), Iraq (2007–2009), Pakistan (2004–2007), Syria (1998–2001), Kuwait (1994–1997), and Lebanon (1990–1993). In January 2010, he became dean of Texas A&M University's George Bush School of Government and Public Service.

Former Secretary of State Colin Powell called Crocker "one of our very best foreign service officers." President George W. Bush called him "America's Lawrence of Arabia" and noted that General David Petraeus had said that "it was a great honor for me to be his military wingman."

== Early life and education ==
Crocker was born and raised in Spokane, Washington. Growing up, he had family members in the U.S. Air Force and in Turkey. He lived in Morocco, Canada and Turkey. Crocker attended University College Dublin and Whitman College in Walla Walla, Washington, where he received a bachelor of arts in English literature in 1971 and is a member of Tau Kappa Epsilon fraternity.

== Career ==
=== Diplomatic posts ===
After graduating from college, he joined the United States Foreign Service, and after Persian language training, was assigned to the American consulate in Khorramshahr, Iran, in 1972. His subsequent assignment was to the newly established embassy in Doha, Qatar, in 1974 as an economic-commercial officer, and in 1976, Crocker returned to Washington, D.C., for long-term Arabic training. He completed the 20-month program at the Foreign Service Institutes Arabic School in Tunis in June 1978. Crocker was then assigned as chief of the economic-commercial section at the U.S. interests section in Baghdad, Iraq. Crocker served in Beirut, Lebanon, as chief of the political section from 1981 to 1984. On September 18, 1982, he reported back to the Department of State about the Sabra and Shatila massacre. He also survived the 1983 United States Embassy bombing.

He spent the 1984–85 academic year at Princeton University as a State Department mid-career fellow in Near Eastern studies. He served as deputy director of the Office of Israel and Arab–Israeli affairs from 1985 to 1987 and was a political counselor at the American Embassy in Cairo from 1987 to 1990. Following the Iraqi invasion of Kuwait in August 1990, Crocker became the director of the Iraq–Kuwait Task Force.

In 1998, as the ambassador to Syria, his residence was plundered by an angry mob.

In the days after the 9/11 attacks, Crocker and other senior U.S. State Department officials flew to Geneva to meet secretly with representatives of the government of Iran. For several months, Crocker and his Iranian counterparts under Major General Qasem Soleimani cooperated on capturing Al Qaeda operatives in the region and fighting the Taliban government in Afghanistan. These meetings stopped after President George W. Bush's "axis of evil" speech hardened Iranian attitudes toward cooperating with the U.S.

In January 2002, he was appointed interim chargé d'affaires to the new government of Afghanistan, and was confirmed as the ambassador to Pakistan in October 2004. In September 2004, President Bush nominated for and appointed him to the diplomatic rank of career ambassador, the highest rank in the Foreign Service, equivalent to a four-star flag officer in the U.S. military. On January 8, 2007, Secretary of State Condoleezza Rice announced that the Bush administration would nominate Crocker as U.S. ambassador to Iraq, replacing Zalmay Khalilzad, once Khalilzad's confirmation as ambassador to the UN was complete. Before leaving Islamabad, Crocker joined Pakistani journalist Ahmed Quraishi in a farewell TV interview on state-run PTV, where he opened up about his experiences in Iraq and the Middle East. Crocker used the occasion to share an incident involving then Vice President Dick Cheney during a short surprise visit to Pakistan in February 2007.

On December 4, 2009, the Bush School of Government and Public Service announced the appointment of Crocker as its next dean, effective January 25, 2010.

Although retired from the State Department and the Foreign Service, Crocker was called upon by the Obama administration and nominated by President Barack Obama in April 2011 to serve as the U.S. ambassador to Afghanistan. The appointment was confirmed by the United States Senate by unanimous consent on June 30, 2011. In July 2012 he stepped down, as announced in May due to unspecified health reasons. When he stepped down, Crocker was named an Honorary Marine by the United States Marine Corps.

In 2013, he received an honorary doctorate degree from the American University of Afghanistan.

On May 10, 2013, he was nominated to serve as a member of the Broadcasting Board of Governors.

In December 2013, he voiced his opinion that America should quietly work with the Syrian government, despite its involvement in the Syrian Civil War, as a lesser of the evils.

In October 2020, Crocker received the Sylvanus Thayer Award presented by the United States Military Academy's Association of Graduates for exemplifying personal devotion West Point's motto, "duty, honor, country."

In December 2024, Texas A&M awarded Crocker with an honorary doctoral degree for Public Service Excellence.

=== 2002 memo concerning Iraq ===
According to the book, Soldier: The Life of Colin Powell by Washington Post reporter Karen DeYoung, as the Bush administration was preparing for war with Iraq in late 2002, then-Secretary of State, Colin Powell ordered Crocker and then–special assistant to the secretary of state, William J. Burns, to prepare a secret memo examining the risks associated with a U.S. invasion of Iraq. The six-page memo, titled "The Perfect Storm", stated that toppling Saddam Hussein could unleash long-repressed sectarian and ethnic tensions, that the Sunni minority would not easily relinquish power, and those powerful neighbors such as Iran, Syria and Saudi Arabia would try to move in to influence events. It also cautioned that the United States would have to start from scratch in building a political and economic system because Iraq's infrastructure was in tatters.

=== Testimony before U.S. Congress ===
On September 10, 2007, Crocker and Commander of the Multi-National Forces in Iraq David H. Petraeus testified before the U.S. House of Representatives about the status of the Iraq war. Similar testimony was given on the following day to the U.S. Senate. In their "Report to Congress on the Situation in Iraq", Crocker stated that "It is no exaggeration to say that Iraq is, and will remain for some time, a traumatized society."

Regarding the politics of Iraq, he said, "In many respects, the debates currently occurring in Iraq--de-Baathification and provincial powers--are akin to those surrounding our civil rights movement or struggle over states rights." He also said, "I do believe that Iraq's leaders have the will to tackle the country's pressing problems, although it will take longer than we originally anticipated because of the environment and the gravity of the issues before them." Crocker argued that "a secure, stable democratic Iraq at peace with its neighbors is attainable."

== Personal life ==
On August 14, 2012, he was arrested in Spokane Valley, Washington, for driving while intoxicated and leaving an automobile accident scene. In November he pleaded guilty to a reduced charge of reckless driving. During court proceedings, it was stated that Crocker had been administered two blood alcohol tests after the accident, with the results of .160 and .152 percent, both exceeding the legal limit of .08. In addition, Crocker's attorney indicated that at the time of the accident, he had recently undergone brain surgery to treat a subdural hematoma, which might have negatively affected his cognitive abilities. Crocker was sentenced to a thirty-day suspension of his driver's license, a $1,000 fine, and 24 months of probation. In addition, he was required to make restitution for the damage he caused to the other vehicle involved in the accident.

== Honors ==
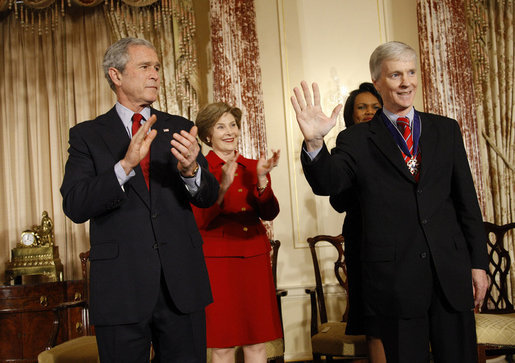
Crocker (right) is presented with the Presidential Medal of Freedom (from left: President George W. Bush, First Lady Laura Bush, Secretary of State Condoleezza Rice, Crocker)

Crocker has received a Presidential Distinguished Service Award in 1994, the State Department Secretary's Distinguished Service Award in 2008 and 2012, the Defense Distinguished Civilian Service Awards in 1997 and 2008, and the Defense Distinguished Public Service Award in 2012. He also holds the State Department Distinguished Honor Award, Award for Valor, three Superior Honor Awards, and the American Foreign Service Association Rivkin Award. In 2020, Crocker received the Sylvanus Thayer Award from the United States Military Academy alumni association.

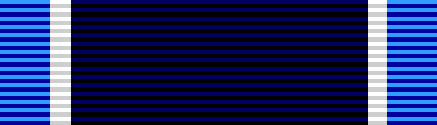

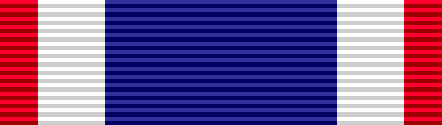

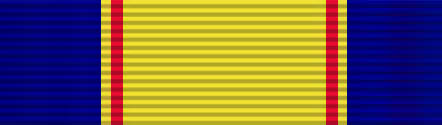

Presidential Medal of Freedom	President's Award for Distinguished Federal Civilian Service	Department of State Secretary's Distinguished Service Award with gold award star (2 awards)	Department of State Distinguished Honor Award
Department of State Award for Valor	Department of State Superior Honor Award with two gold award stars (3 awards)	Department of Defense Distinguished Civilian Service Award with bronze palm (2 awards)	Department of Defense Distinguished Public Service Award

Diplomatic posts
Preceded by John Thomas McCarthy	United States Ambassador to Lebanon; 1990–1993	Succeeded by Mark Gregory Hambley
Preceded by Edward Gnehm	United States Ambassador to Kuwait; 1994–1997	Succeeded by James Larocco
Preceded by Christopher W.S. Ross	United States Ambassador to Syria; 1999–2001	Succeeded by Theodore H. Kattouf
Preceded by James Dobbins	United States Ambassador to Afghanistan; Acting; 2002	Succeeded by Robert Finn
Preceded by Nancy Jo Powell	United States Ambassador to Pakistan; 2004–2007	Succeeded by Anne W. Patterson
Preceded by Zalmay Khalilzad	United States Ambassador to Iraq; 2007–2009	Succeeded by Christopher R. Hill
Preceded by Karl Eikenberry	United States Ambassador to Afghanistan; 2011–2012	Succeeded by James B. Cunningham
