= Secretary's Award =

Award from the United States Department of State

Secretary’s Award
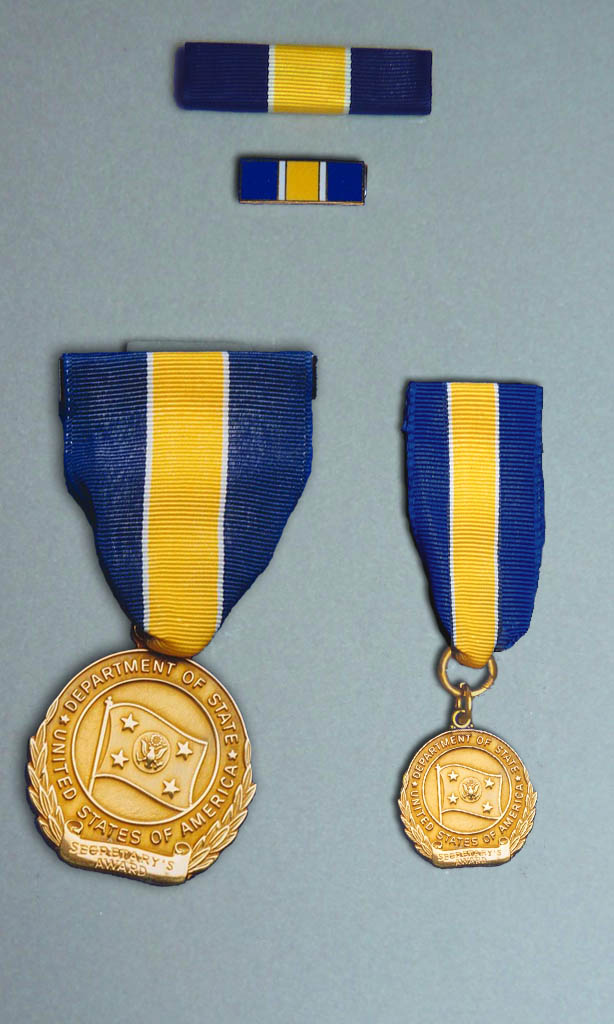
- Type: Military medal
- Awarded for: "Recognition of sacrifice of health or life, in the performance of official duties"
- Presented by: United States Department of State
- Eligibility: Foreign Service, Civil Service, US Military
- Status: Currently awarded
- Ribbon

Precedence
- Next (higher): Secretary’s Distinguished Service Award
- Next (lower): Award for Heroism; Award for Valor (obsolete)

The Secretary’s Award is an award of the United States Department of State. It is presented to employees of State, USAID and Marine guards assigned to diplomatic and consular facilities in recognition of sacrifice of health or life, in the performance of official duties. It is somewhat similar in function to the U.S. military’s Purple Heart medal, though it tends to only be issued for serious injuries that are directly related to official duties.

The award consists of a gold medal set and a certificate signed by the Secretary of State. For injuries resulting in death, the Thomas Jefferson Star for Foreign Service is typically awarded to next of kin. The criteria for the issuance of the Secretary’s Award is up to the Secretary of State.

== Nomination and approval ==
Nominations for State and USAID employees are submitted on Form JF-66, Nomination for Award, through supervisory channels to the Joint Country Awards Committee for review and recommendation to the Chief of Mission for final action.

Nominations initiated in Washington are submitted to the appropriate area awards committee for final action. For USAID, nominations initiated in Washington are reviewed by the USAID bureau/office with final approval by the appropriate assistant administrator or office head.

== Military use ==
Upon authorization, members of the U.S. military may wear the medal and ribbon in the appropriate order of precedence as a U.S. non-military personal decoration.

== Recipients ==
- José Rivera Hernández, Major, USAF, in West Rashid, Iraq, July 2007, for injuries sustained during a terrorist attack while serving on a Department of State Provincial Reconstruction Team
- Worley (Lee) Reed, Special Agent / Security Engineering Officer, U.S. Diplomatic Security Service, Nairobi, Kenya, August 7, 1998, for disabling injuries sustained during the terrorist bombing of the U.S. Embassy, Nairobi, Kenya, while leading the internal Embassy Search and Rescue Team immediately after the bombing.

== See also ==
- Awards of the United States Department of State
- Awards and decorations of the United States government
- United States Department of State
- United States Foreign Service
