= Award for Heroism =

United States Department of State award

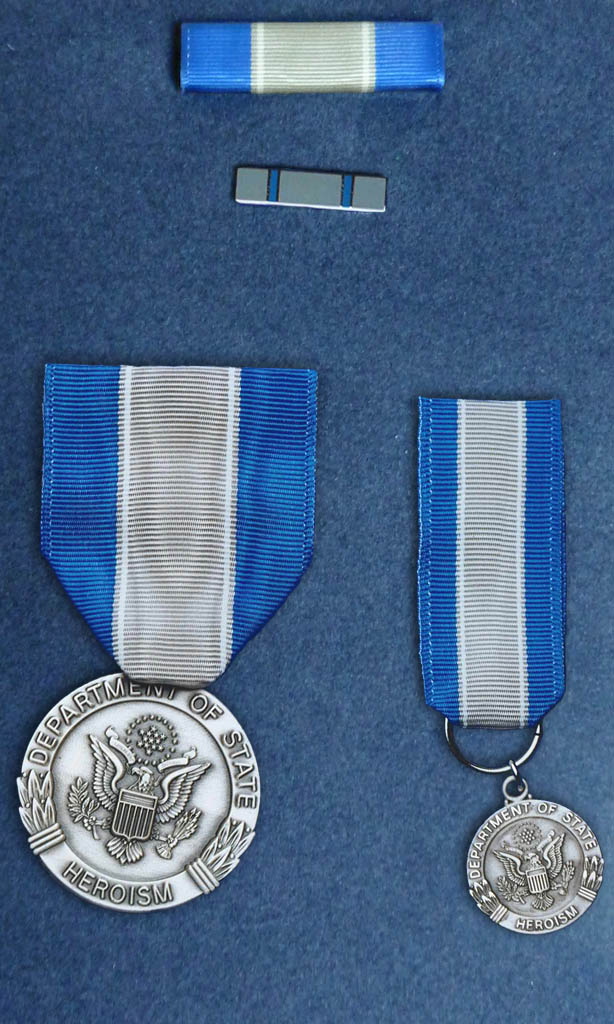
- Type: Military medal
- Awarded for: "Acts of courage or outstanding performance under unusually difficult or dangerous circumstances"
- Presented by: United States Department of State
- Eligibility: Foreign Service, Civil Service, US Military
- Status: Currently awarded
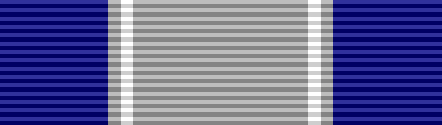
- Ribbon

Precedence
- Next (higher): Secretary’s Award
- Next (lower): Thomas Jefferson Star for Foreign Service; Award for Valor (obsolete)

The Award for Heroism is an award of the United States Department of State. It is presented to employees of State, USAID and Marine guards assigned to diplomatic and consular facilities in recognition of acts of courage or outstanding performance under unusually difficult or dangerous circumstances, whether or not in connection with the performance of assigned duties.

The award consists of a silver medal set and a certificate signed by an assistant secretary, an official of equivalent rank or the Chief of Mission. Due to the location and dangerous nature of their work, the majority of the recipients have been Foreign Service Special Agents of the Diplomatic Security Service.

The Award for Heroism is a replacement for the former Award for Valor. The basic difference between the two medals is that the Valor Award was issued in 10K gold whereas the Heroism Award is issued in sterling silver. The ribbon reflects this; the designs are almost identical, but the color scheme indicates the precious metal issued with the respective awards.

== Criteria ==
The following criteria are applicable to granting an Award for Heroism:

- Sustained superior performance while under threat of physical attack or harassment; or
- An individual act of courage or exceptional performance at the risk of personal safety.

== Nominating and approval procedures ==
Nominations for State and USAID employees are submitted on Form JF-66, Nomination for Award, through supervisory channels to the Joint Country Awards Committee for review and recommendation to the Chief of Mission for final action.

Nominations initiated in Washington are submitted to the appropriate area awards committee for final action. For USAID, nominations initiated in Washington are reviewed by the USAID bureau/office with final approval by the appropriate assistant administrator or office head.

== Military use ==
Upon authorization, members of the U.S. military may wear the medal and ribbon in the appropriate order of precedence as a U.S. non-military personal decoration.

== Recipients ==
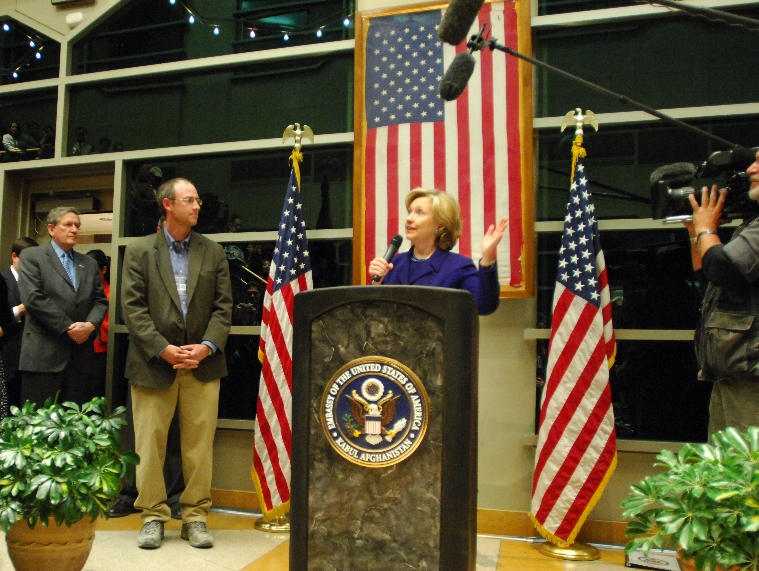
Secretary Hillary Clinton presents the Department of State Award for Heroism to Matthew T. Sherman, November 18, 2009

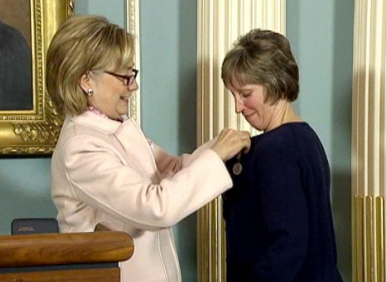
Secretary Clinton pins Award for Heroism on Principal Officer Lynne Tracy

• Diplomatic Security Contractors who responded to a coordinated attack on Camp Sullivan in December 2016, protected a 150 foot gap in the perimeter of the US Embassy Support Center and rescued American's trapped in one of many collapsed buildings.

- A team of Consular Officers who were on the ground at Hamid Karzai International Airport (HKIA) in Kabul to assist with the largest NEO airlift in US history, relocating 124,000 people from Kabul in August 2021, including American citizens, legal permanent residents and tens of thousands of Afghan allies. Knowing the threats and dangers involved, Consular Officers stepped forward to go to Kabul to join the team that worked with the U.S. military to evacuate over 124,000 Americans, LPRs, and at-risk Afghans. They were exposed to rioting, gunfire, and incoming rocket fire. They worked with children separated from parents, often thrown over the airport gates alone, left to Consular Officers to offer comfort and safety. They worked with Afghans injured in rioting and crushed by crowds, helping them get assistance. They saw grievous injury and death firsthand, a constant reminder of the danger they faced.
- Matt Sherman, Foreign Service Officer, former Senior Civilian Representative in Afghanistan for assisting in the rescue of wounded American soldiers following an ambush in the Tangi Valley, Wardak Province, 2009.
- Lynne Tracy, Foreign Service Officer, former Consul General of the U.S. Consulate General in Peshawar, Pakistan, 2007–2009, for service in Pakistan weathering numerous threats and a failed assassination attempt
- Tomas A. Perez, Diplomatic Courier, 2009, for saving lives and ensuring the integrity of diplomatic cargo during an airplane crash
- Paul Peterson, Special Agent, Diplomatic Security Service, RSO, Nairobi, 1998, for Perimeter Protection / search and rescue of injured American employees in the Al Qaeda bombing of the US Embassy, Nairobi, Kenya
- Bob Simon, Special Agent, Diplomatic Security Service, ARSO, Nairobi, 1998, for Perimeter Protection / search and rescue of injured American employees in the Al Qaeda bombing of the US Embassy, Nairobi, Kenya
- John V. Kane, Special Agent, Diplomatic Security Service, ARSO, Nairobi, 1998, for Perimeter Protection / search and rescue of injured American employees in the Al Qaeda bombing of the US Embassy, Nairobi, Kenya
- Worley (Lee) Reed, Special Agent / Security Engineering Officer, Diplomatic Security Service, OIC/ESC, Nairobi, 1998, for Leading search and rescue of injured American employees in the Al Qaeda bombing of the US Embassy, Nairobi, Kenya
- Joyce Ann Reed, Information Management Assistant, Communications Office, Nairobi, 1998, for search and rescue / medical evacuation of injured American employees in the Al Qaeda bombing of the US Embassy, Nairobi, Kenya (She is spouse of Worley (Lee) Reed; they are first married couple to win the award for the same incident)
- Stephen J. Nolan, Foreign Service Officer, U.S. Ambassador to Botswana
- Thomas Eckert, Special Agent, Diplomatic Security Service, Burma, 2009, for the rescue of an American family during a flood
- Bryan Bachman, Special Agent, Diplomatic Security Service, Iraq, 2008, for courageous efforts to protect the Basrah Regional Embassy Office from attack
- Daniel Wilhelm, Special Agent, Diplomatic Security Service, Iraq, 2008, for courageous efforts to protect the Basrah Regional Embassy Office from attack
- John L. Dunlop, Foreign Service Officer, USAID,
  - First Award: Nairobi, 1998, search and rescue of injured American employees in the Al Qaeda bombing of the US Embassy, Nairobi, Kenya
  - Second Award: Baghdad, 2009, response to the Dora Market suicide bombing of 5/21/2009
- Michael Poehlitz, Special Agent, Diplomatic Security Service, Nicaragua, 2007, for saving an American citizen from a violent and angry mob
- Christopher Belmonti, Special Agent, Diplomatic Security Service, Haiti, 2004, for risking his life to save American citizens during an evacuation
- Raymond Kyliavas, Special Agent, Diplomatic Security Service, Haiti, 2004, for risking his life to save American citizens during an evacuation
- Alston Richardson, Special Agent, Diplomatic Security Service, Haiti, 2004, for risking his life to save American citizens during an evacuation
- Brian C. Palmatier, Special Agent, assisted an injured U.S. Marine and then immediately rendered first aid preventing the critically injured Marine from going into shock and stabilized his condition until other first responders arrived. Attending surgeons credited SA Palmatier with the Marine’s survival.
- Jason Crosby, Special Agent, after the U.S. Embassy in Baghdad, Iraq was hit by a rocket, Crosby responded and administered critical medical aid to three severely injured staff and set up an evacuation site. Crosby also led a motorcade out of a sniper ambush and evacuated a wounded colleague.
- George Jacobson, mission coordinator at the Embassy of the United States, Saigon for killing a Vietcong during the Tet offensive attack on US Embassy

== See also ==
- Awards of the United States Department of State
- Awards and decorations of the United States government
- United States Department of State
- U.S. Foreign Service
