= Matt Sherman (lawyer) =

American lawyer (born 1971)

Matthew T. Sherman
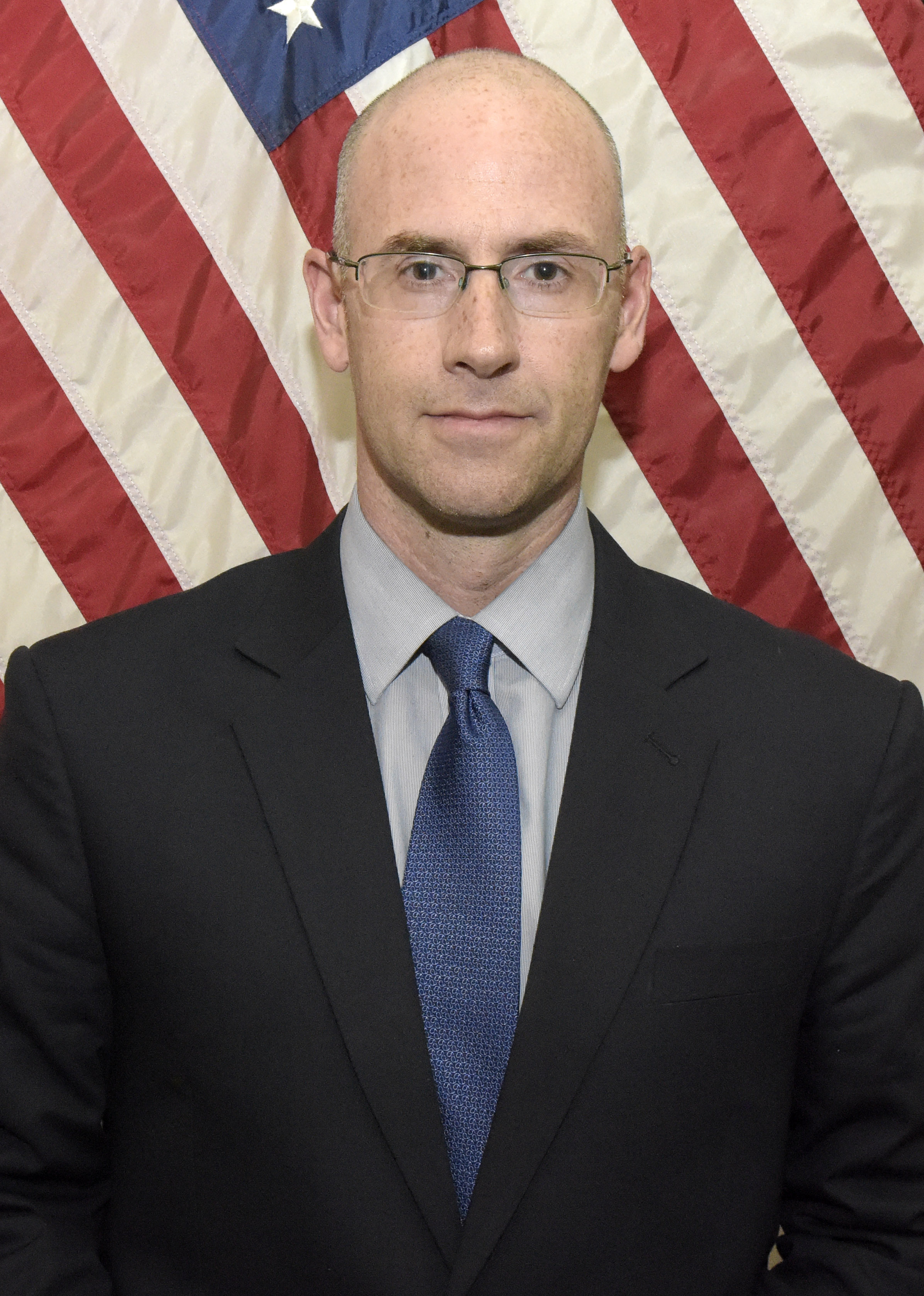

Personal details
- Born: December 30, 1971 (age 54) United States
- Education: B.A., University of North Carolina; M.Phil., Cambridge University; J.D., University of North Carolina School of Law
- Occupation: Lawyer, Diplomat
- Awards: Award for Heroism (Dept. of State)

Matthew Sherman (born December 30, 1971) is a foreign affairs practitioner who has served as a senior advisor to the United States Department of State and Defense. Cumulatively, he deployed to Iraq and Afghanistan for nearly a decade, making him one of the longest serving U.S. government officials to support both conflicts. Mr. Sherman’s last overseas assignment was to Afghanistan for nearly three and a half years as a civilian advisor to numerous operational and strategic military commanders. Most recently, until March 2016, he was the Political Advisor to the Resolute Support Commander, General John F. Campbell.

== Early life and education ==
Sherman grew up in Neshanic Station, New Jersey.

He received his bachelor's degree from the University of North Carolina in 1994, graduating Phi Beta Kappa. Sherman received his master's degree in international relations from Cambridge University in 1996. As a Fulbright Scholar, he worked with the Australian Minister for Foreign Affairs on US - Australian trade regulations. He later returned to Chapel Hill and received his J.D. from the University of North Carolina School of Law in 2002.

== Career ==
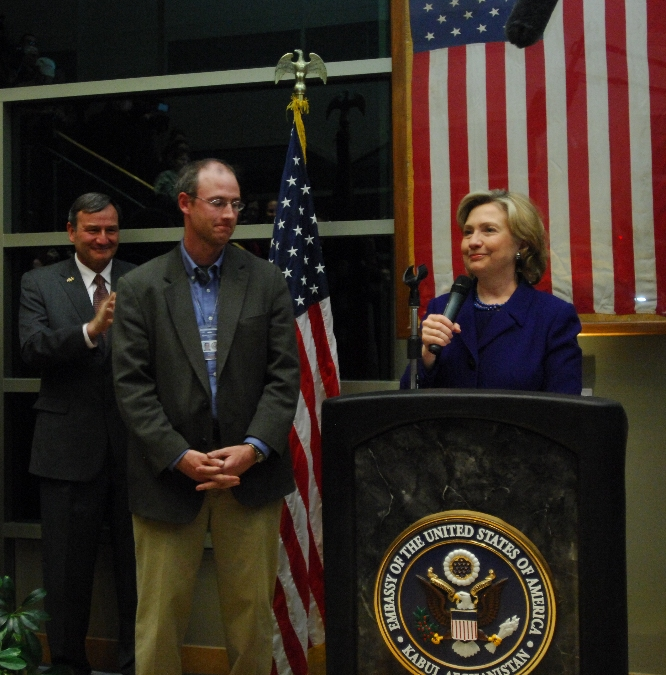
Secretary Hillary Clinton presents the Department of State Award for Heroism to Matthew T. Sherman in Kabul, Afghanistan. November 18, 2009

In previous assignments with the United States government, Sherman has served as a senior advisor to the Department of State and Defense. In 2011 Sherman completed a 27-month tour in Afghanistan with the Department of State. In 2010 and 2011 he was the chief civilian advisor in the Kabul based Strategic Advisory Group, serving under General Stanley McChrystal and subsequently General David Petraeus. In 2009, Sherman was the Senior Civilian Representative in Logar and Wardak provinces of Afghanistan. In November 2009, he was presented the Department of State Award for Heroism by Secretary Hillary Clinton for assisting in the rescue of wounded American soldiers following an ambush in Afghanistan.

Sherman also served two extended tours in Iraq. In 2003 - 2006, under the Coalition Provisional Authority and later the Department of State, he was the personal advisor to four separate Iraqi Ministers of Interior and advised senior Iraqi and Coalition personnel on non-military security matters. From 2006 to 2007 Sherman worked as the Political Advisor to the First Cavalry Division, the military unit in charge of operations in Baghdad during the planning and implementation of the "surge".

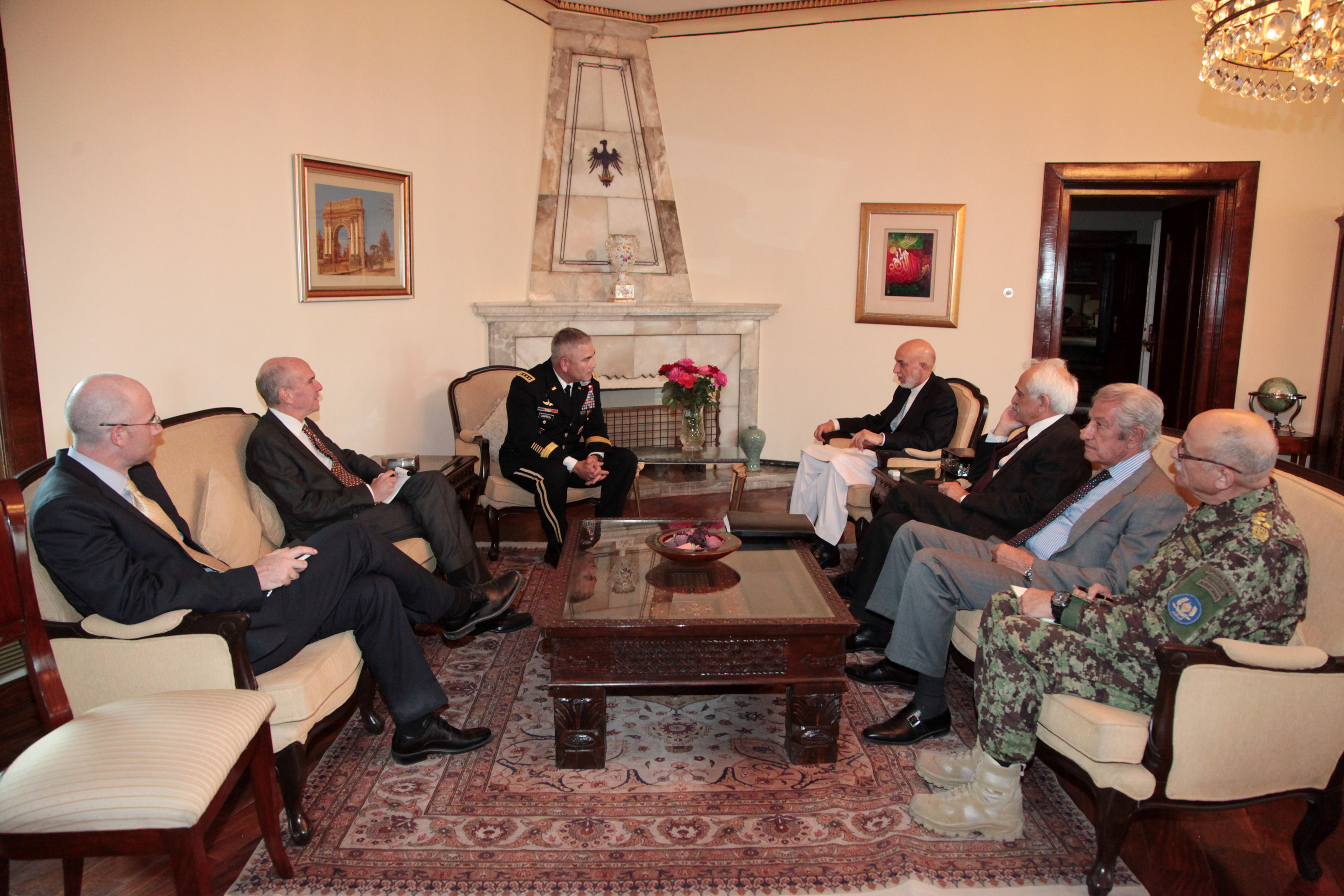
General John F. Campbell, Ambassador P. Michael McKinley and Matthew T. Sherman meet with Afghan President Hamid Karzai and his national security team on 27 August 2014 at the Presidential Palace in Kabul.

Since departing government in mid 2016, Sherman established the Strategic Systems Group, a security sector consultancy. He also worked earlier as a Senior Advisor to The Scowcroft Group, and an Adjunct with the RAND Corporation. He is a member of The Atlantic Council. Earlier, in a private capacity, Sherman worked as Director of Research for General Colin Powell (Ret.) and his non-profit organization, America's Promise. Trained as an attorney, Sherman practiced corporate law for the firm Drinker Biddle & Reath.

Sherman is a contributor to the Opinion page of The New York Times and The Washington Post and has provided foreign affairs' analysis to the PBS NewsHour, Frontline, and NBC Nightly News, among others. In November 2008, Sherman published an article in The American Interest outlining how dwindling U.S. leverage needed to be recalibrated to address the shifting political environment in Iraq.

== Published works ==
- Iraq's Little Armies The New York Times, March 8, 2006.
- Iraq's Sunni Time Bomb The New York Times, April 3, 2008.
- What the Afghan war is missing: A sense of desperation The Washington Post, June 24, 2011.
- The Role of Police in Counterinsurgency Operations in Iraq, 2003–6 (with Josh Paul), in Fair & Ganguly, Policing Insurgencies: Cops as Counterinsurgents
- Political Resets and U.S. Leverage in Iraq The American Interest, November 1, 2008.
