= Sylvanus Thayer Award =

Annual military award

The Sylvanus Thayer Award is an honor given annually by the United States Military Academy at West Point to an individual whose character and accomplishments exemplifies the motto of West Point. The award is named after the "Father of the Military Academy", Colonel Sylvanus Thayer. The awardee is selected by, and the award is endowed by, a committee formed from the West Point Association of Graduates. It has been awarded annually since 1958 and is the closest recognition West Point has to granting an honorary degree.

== Official description of the award ==
Since 1958, the West Point Association of Graduates has presented the SYLVANUS THAYER AWARD to an outstanding citizen of the United States whose service and accomplishments in the national interest exemplify personal devotion to the ideals expressed in the West Point motto: DUTY, HONOR, COUNTRY.

The recipient of the Sylvanus Thayer Award receives a medal with a bust in profile of Thayer on one side, with the inscription: "The Sylvanus Thayer Medal Awarded by the Association of Graduates, United States Military Academy, for Outstanding Service to the Nation." The reverse side carries the coat of arms of the Military Academy and the words "West Point" and "Duty, Honor, Country". Around the edge of the medal are inscribed the name of the recipient and the year of presentation. In addition to receiving the medal, the recipient's portrait and name are inscribed on a memorial in the Thayer Award Room in Taylor Hall, the headquarters building of West Point.

== Criteria ==
Active-duty and retired American military servicemen or women are eligible for the award, but the majority are civilians who contributed to the US Government, the US Armed Forces, US national security or diplomacy, US civil rights or the enduring support of veterans in a positive way. The recipient must be a US Citizen, must not be a United States Military Academy graduate, and must receive the award in person during a ceremony with the entire Corps of Cadets. Early in its existence, three West Point graduates received the award - Dwight Eisenhower, Douglas MacArthur, and Omar Bradley - but graduates are no longer eligible. One United States Naval Academy graduate, Ross Perot, has received the award.

== Recipients ==
The following is the list of the award's recipients:

- 1958 – Dr. Ernest Lawrence
- 1959 – Secretary John Foster Dulles
- 1960 – Ambassador Henry Cabot Lodge Jr.
- 1961 – President Dwight D. Eisenhower
- 1962 – General of the Army Douglas MacArthur
- 1963 – Secretary John J. McCloy
- 1964 – Secretary Robert A. Lovett
- 1965 – Ambassador James B. Conant
- 1966 – Congressman Carl Vinson
- 1967 - Cardinal Francis Spellman
- 1968 – Mr. Bob Hope
- 1969 – Secretary Dean Rusk
- 1970 – Ambassador Ellsworth Bunker
- 1971 – Mr. Neil Armstrong
- 1972 – Pastor Billy Graham
- 1973 – General of the Army Omar Bradley
- 1974 – Ambassador Robert Daniel Murphy
- 1975 – Governor W. Averell Harriman
- 1976 – Secretary Gordon Gray
- 1977 – Secretary Robert T. Stevens
- 1978 – Mr. James R. Killian Jr.
- 1979 – Ambassador Clare Boothe Luce
- 1980 – Father Theodore M. Hesburgh
- 1981 – Administrator James E. Webb
- 1982 – Mr. David Packard
- 1983 – General James H. Doolittle
- 1984 – Secretary Stanley Rogers Resor
- 1985 – Secretary Frank Pace Jr.
- 1986 – Dr. Edward Teller
- 1987 – Senator Barry Goldwater
- 1988 – Chief Justice Warren E. Burger
- 1989 – President Ronald Reagan
- 1990 – Senator Mike Mansfield
- 1991 – Secretary Paul H. Nitze
- 1992 – Secretary George Shultz
- 1993 – Secretary Cyrus R. Vance
- 1994 – President George Herbert Walker Bush
- 1995 – Congresswoman Barbara Jordan
- 1996 – General John W. Vessey
- 1997 – Mr. Walter Cronkite
- 1998 – General Colin Powell (US Secretary of State)
- 1999 – Mr. Norman R. Augustine
- 2000 – Secretary Henry Alfred Kissinger
- 2001 – Senator Daniel K. Inouye
- 2002 – The American Soldier (Note: The 2002 award was "dedicated to...all of the men and women who have served in the U.S. Army...in the history of the United States.")
- 2003 – General Gordon R. Sullivan
- 2004 – Senator Robert J. Dole
- 2005 – Justice Sandra Day O'Connor
- 2006 – Mr. Tom Brokaw
- 2007 – General Frederick Kroesen
- 2008 – Secretary William Perry
- 2009 – Mr. H. Ross Perot
- 2010 – Secretary James Baker
- 2011 – Secretary Robert M. Gates
- 2012 – Congressman Ike Skelton
- 2013 – Secretary Madeleine Albright
- 2014 – Secretary Condoleezza Rice
- 2015 – Mr. Gary Sinise
- 2016 – Director Robert S. Mueller
- 2017 – President George W. Bush
- 2018 – Secretary Leon E. Panetta
- 2019 – General Ann E. Dunwoody
- 2020 – Ambassador Ryan Crocker
- 2021 - Doctor Mae C. Jemison
- 2022 - Mr. Kenneth Fisher
- 2023 - Senator Elizabeth Dole
- 2024 – President Barack Obama
- 2025 – Tom Hanks (award ceremony cancelled)
