= Javier Corona =

Javier G. Corona (April 20, 1927 – July 19, 2003) was a former diplomat and restaurateur born in Mexico who helped promote American arts and artist in Mexico.

He received the Superior Honor Award from the United States Department of State for his accomplishments as a promoter of the American arts during his 28-year career at the American Embassy in Mexico City.

Before his career with the¯American government, Corona earned degrees in accounting and advertising and studied art in Mexico City and New York City. He then worked for the Foreign Service at the Mexican Consulate in Montreal, Quebec, Canada for several years.

After his career as the cultural attaché in Mexico City, Corona retired from the American Embassy and moved with his family to Austin, Texas, where he and his wife Amelia Corona opened a Mexican food restaurant, which aimed to bring authentic Mexican interior food dishes and cuisine from all the regions of Mexico. Corona incorporated his wife's recipes into the restaurant's menu. At the time, the majority of the local Mexican restaurants were offering Tex-Mex food. His restaurant (Las Palomas) opened its doors in 1983.

Javier G. Corona was a prolific artist as well, and had several exhibitions of his work both in Mexico and in the U.S. Some of his paintings can be seen at his restaurant.

After his death, the Texas Senate and the Texas House of Representatives passed a proclamation and a resolution (S.P. No.116 & H.R No.110 respectively) to honor Mr. Corona's memory.
