= George Jacobson =

United States soldier (1912-1989)

George D. Jacobson
- Born: 6 September 1912; Milwaukee
- Died: 18 May 1989 (aged 76); Walter Reed Army Medical Center
- Burial place: Arlington National Cemetery
- Military career
- Allegiance: United States of America
- Branch: United States Army
- Service years: 1941–1967
- Rank: Colonel
- Nickname: Jake
- Conflicts: World War II; Korean War; Vietnam War
- Awards: Legion of Merit (2); Bronze Star; Army Commendation Medal (2); Distinguished Honor Award; Award for Heroism

Colonel George D. Jacobson (6 September 1912 – 18 May 1989) was a United States Army officer who served in World War II, the Korean War and the Vietnam War.

== Early life ==
He was born in Milwaukee on 6 September 1912 and worked as a professional magician.

== Career ==
He joined the Army in 1941 and attended Officer Candidates School receiving his commission in 1942. He served as an armored cavalry officer in the European theatre and then served with the Allied Control Council in Bavaria. On his return to the United States he served with the 11th Armored Cavalry Regiment.

In 1954 he went to Vietnam as assistant to General Thomas J. H. Trapnell, head of Military Assistance Advisory Group (MAAG) Indochina seeing the final months of the First Indochina War. He then returned to the U.S. in 1957 and served as a faculty member at the Army Command and General Staff College at Fort Leavenworth, Kansas.

In 1961 he was posted to Saigon, South Vietnam as deputy chief of staff of MAAG Vietnam. In 1965 he was assigned to the Agency for International Development (AID) as associate director of field operations. He was then recruited by Ambassador Henry Cabot Lodge Jr. to serve as mission coordinator at the Embassy of the United States, Saigon.

In July 1966 the U.S. Mission Council directed him to head an interagency committee to study the issue of revolutionary development. The committee submitted its findings on 24 August, stating that radical reform within the South Vietnamese government and armed forces was necessary with the goal of establishing a government capable of gaining popular support and winning the war. He retired from the Army in 1967.

He resided in a villa on the embassy compound and during the Tet offensive attack on US Embassy he was awakened by the firing of the Vietcong (VC) attack at 02:47 on 31 January 1968; searching for a weapon, he found a single M26 grenade. After dawn as U.S. forces cleared the VC in the compound Jacobson heard movement downstairs; he threw down his grenade and called out to the Military Policemen (MPs) in the grounds to throw him up a weapon. MPs threw up an M1911 Colt pistol and a gas mask to him, CS gas grenades were then thrown by the MPs through the ground floor windows, a VC came upstairs firing his AK-47 and Jacobson shot him dead. COMUSMACV General William Westmoreland later presented Jacobson with the AK-47 mounted with a plaque reading "A VC fired this weapon and missed. The Colonel fired back and didn't." Peter Arnett later wrote that he had phoned Jacobson at approximately 04:40 while he was trapped in his villa and that Jacobson told him that the VC "are calculating a big splash all over the world with their activities."

In December 1968 he was appointed assistant chief of staff of Civil Operations and Revolutionary Development Support (CORDS), the U.S. and South Vietnamese pacification program. In April 1970 he expressed his concerns that the pacification program had lost momentum and that "if its not moving forward, it will move backward." By the end of 1970 he expressed his views that the VC relied on terror to try to control contested areas. In July 1971 he succeeded William Colby as head of CORDS, serving in that role until CORDS was terminated in February 1973 with the implementation of the Paris Peace Accords. He then returned to the embassy staff as assistant for field operations, a vaguely defined role in which he supervised agricultural specialists across the country.

By 1975 Jacobson had served under four Ambassadors and according to Frank Snepp he had become a loyal supporter of Ambassador Graham Martin in order to secure his tenure at the embassy. Jacobson apparently shared Martin's over-optimism about the survival of South Vietnam in the face of the North's 1975 spring offensive, claiming in mid-April that a negotiated settlement was imminent. On 17 April Martin appointed Jacobson as the embassy's evacuation coordinator. He was one of the last embassy staffers to be evacuated from Saigon during Operation Frequent Wind, leaving on the same helicopter as Martin on the morning of 30 April. Snepp asserts that Jacobson failed to arrange the evacuation of approximately 900 of his 1,100 at-risk Vietnamese field operations staff.

Following his return to the U.S. he worked for AID before retiring in 1976.

== Later life and death ==
He lived with his wife Marge in Vienna, Virginia. He died of lung disease at Walter Reed Army Medical Center on 18 May 1989. He was buried at Arlington National Cemetery.

== Decorations ==
His decorations included the Legion of Merit (2), Bronze Star, Army Commendation Medal (2) Distinguished Honor Award and Award for Heroism.
