= Distinguished Honor Award =

Award given by the United States Department of State

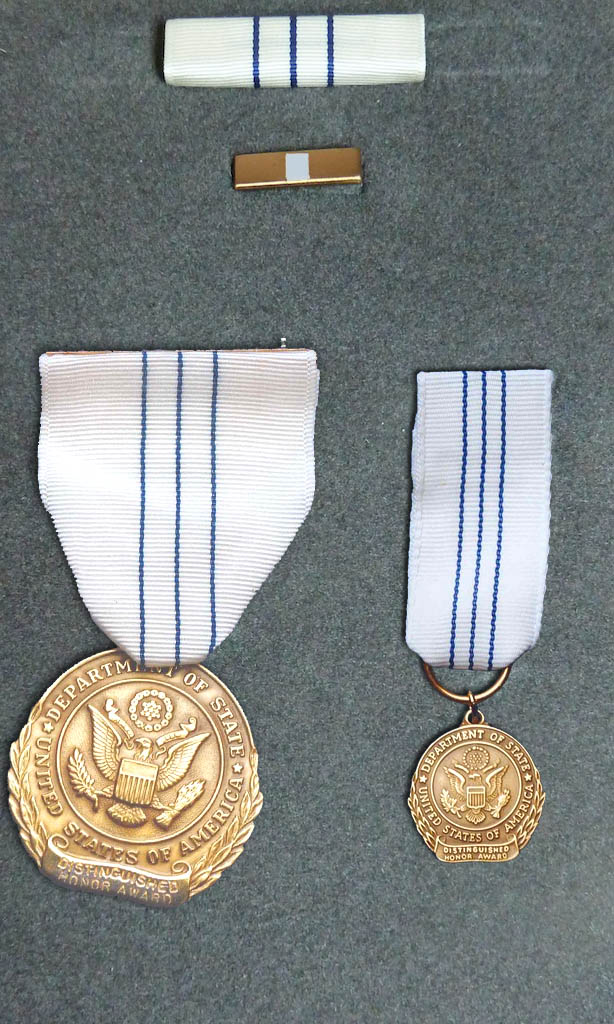
- Type: Military medal
- Awarded for: "Exceptionally outstanding service or achievements of marked national or international significance"
- Presented by: United States Department of State
- Eligibility: Foreign Service, Civil Service, US Military
- Status: Currently awarded
- Ribbon

Precedence
- Next (higher): Thomas Jefferson Star for Foreign Service
- Next (lower): Superior Honor Award

The Distinguished Honor Award is an award of the United States Department of State and USAID. Similar versions of the same award existed for the former U.S. Information Agency and Arms Control and Disarmament Agency. It is presented in recognition of exceptionally outstanding service or achievements of marked national or international significance.

The award consists of a gold medal set and a certificate signed, as appropriate, by the Secretary of State. Due to the demanding nature of the criteria, the award is not routinely issued; only a few non-Ambassadorial rank Foreign Service Officers have ever received an individual award.

== Criteria ==
The following criteria are applicable to granting a Distinguished Honor Award:

- Exceptionally outstanding service to the agencies or the U.S. Government resulting in achievements of marked national or international significance;
- Exceptionally outstanding service and/or leadership in the administration of one or more agency programs that results in the highly successful accomplishment of mission, or in a major attainment of objectives or specific accomplishment to meet unique or emergency situations; and
- Outstanding accomplishments over a prolonged period that involve the exercise of authority or judgment in the public interest.

== Nominating and approval procedures ==
Nominations for State and USAID employees are submitted on Form JF-66, Nomination for Award, through supervisory channels to the Joint Country Awards Committee for review and recommendation to the Chief of Mission for final action.

Nominations initiated in Washington are submitted to the appropriate area awards committee for final action. For USAID, nominations initiated in Washington are reviewed by the USAID bureau/office with final approval by the appropriate assistant administrator or office head.

== Military use ==
Upon authorization, members of the U.S. military may wear the medal and ribbon in the appropriate order of precedence as a U.S. non-military personal decoration.

== Notable recipients ==
- Tex Harris, Foreign Service Officer
- Carol Lee van Voorst, former Ambassador to Iceland, 2006-2009
- Peter W. Chiarelli, General, U.S. Army
- David H. Petraeus, General, U.S. Army
- Richard Armitage, former Deputy Secretary of State, 2001-2005
- Ambassador Charles W. Yost, career U.S. diplomat, United States Ambassador to the United Nations
- Ambassador L. Paul Bremer, former head of the Coalition Provisional Authority in Iraq, 2003–2004
- Ambassador Eric J. Boswell, current Assistant Secretary for Diplomatic Security
- Ambassador Lino Gutiérrez, former U.S. Ambassador to Argentina, 2003-2006
- Ambassador James Franklin Collins, former U.S. Ambassador to the Russian Federation, 1997–2001
- Ambassador John R. Davis Jr., former U.S. Ambassador to Poland, 1988-1990
- Harry B. Harris Jr., Admiral, US Pacific Command
- Jacques Paul Klein, United Nations Transitional Administrator (UNTAES)
- Brett H. McGurk, Director for Iraq, United States National Security Council
- Jonathan M. Moore, former U.S. Charge d'Affaires to Belarus, 2008-2009
- Alec Ross, technology policy analyst and Senior Advisor for Innovation to Secretary of State Hillary Clinton
- Paul J. Selva, General, Vice Chairman of the Joint Chiefs of Staff
- James B. Story, Charge d’Affaires to Venezuela
- George Jacobson, mission coordinator at the Embassy of the United States, Saigon

== See also ==
- Awards of the United States Department of State
- Awards and decorations of the United States government
- United States Department of State
- U.S. Foreign Service
