= Thomas Jefferson Star for Foreign Service =

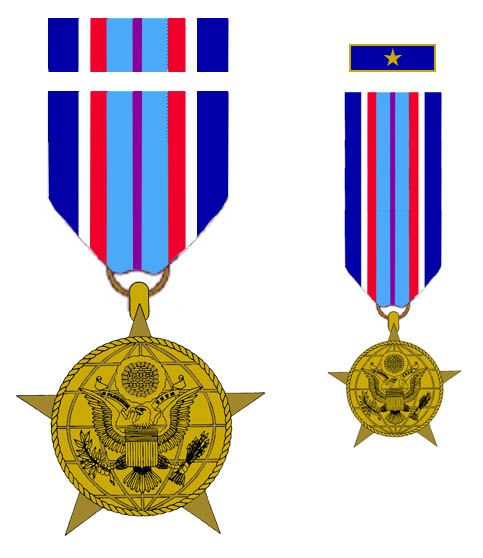
- Type: Military medal
- Awarded for: "Death or a serious illness or injury that results in death, permanent incapacity or disability"
- Presented by: United States Department of State
- Eligibility: Foreign Service, Civil Service
- Status: Currently awarded
- Ribbon

Precedence
- Next (higher): Award for Heroism; Award for Valor (obsolete)
- Next (lower): Distinguished Honor Award

The Thomas Jefferson Star for Foreign Service is an award of the United States Department of State. It is presented to employees of State, USAID, and civilian contractors assigned to diplomatic and consular facilities for events that lead to death or serious illness or injury. It is roughly comparable to the U.S. military's Purple Heart, but since the criteria for the award is so strict, nearly all of them are awarded posthumously.

The award consists of a gold medal set and a certificate signed by the secretary of state and the president of the United States.

The initial regulations limited the issuance of the Thomas Jefferson Star for Foreign Service, originally known as the Foreign Service Star, only to members of the U.S. Foreign Service personnel system who were killed or seriously injured. The rules were later changed to allow for members of other personnel systems killed while working on behalf of a foreign affairs agency.

There had been controversy about the name of the award, which suggested that only diplomats serving under the Foreign Service personnel system were eligible. As a result, Secretary of State Colin Powell proposed changing the name of the award from the Foreign Service Star to simply the Thomas Jefferson Star, naming it for the Founding Father who served as the first secretary of state. The American Foreign Service Association and the Foreign Affairs Council resisted the proposal while many others strongly supported it. In the end, the words "Foreign Service" were maintained as part of the name.

== Eligibility ==
Any civilian employee of any agency, including Foreign Service Nationals (appointed under Section 303 of the Foreign Service Act), non-family member U.S. citizen employees hired at post (appointed under Section 303 and appointed under Section 311 (a) of the Foreign Service Act), and U.S. citizens and foreign nationals serving under a Personal Services Contract or Personal Services Agreement (if eligibility for the award is authorized in their contracts), are eligible for the Foreign Service Star Award as long as the employee is:

(1) Under the administrative direction of State or USAID;
(2) Employed at, or assigned permanently or temporarily to an official mission abroad, or while traveling abroad on official business; and
(3) Killed or incurs a serious illness or injury which requires hospitalization or similar treatment and which results in incapacity or disability that prevents the employee from performing his or her official duties or adversely affects his or her ability to obtain medical clearance, while the employee:

(a) Is performing official duties;
(b) Is located on the premises of a U.S. mission abroad; or alternatively,
(c) By reason of the individual's status as U.S. Government employee.

== Criteria ==
a. Selection of award recipients will be based on:

(1) The nexus between the death, illness or injury and the act of serving abroad in an official capacity. The death, illness or injury must be linked to the official duties of the employee. This may be by reason of location at the U.S. mission, by reason of the employee's status as a U.S. Government official, or by reason of the fact that the employee is performing, or en-route to perform official duties; and

(2) The seriousness of the illness or injury. An illness or injury is "serious" if it requires hospitalization or similar treatment and results in incapacity or disability that prevents the employee from performing his other official duties or adversely affects his or her ability to obtain medical clearance.

b. Examples of employees meeting the selection criteria include, but are not limited to:

(1) The United States as the target of hostile action:

(a) Mission as target while performing official duty, hostile fire kills or wounds a U.S. civilian employee who is accompanying U.S. peacekeepers abroad;
(b) Employee as target, but not while on official duty, a commercial airliner flying abroad is hijacked and an employee, by reason of his or her status as a U.S. Government official, is subjected to mistreatment resulting in death, injury or serious illness.

(2) Accidents occurring in a hostile environment or crisis situation:

(a) Employee is killed or wounded by "friendly fire" launched to counter or respond to hostile action.
(b) Employee is killed or wounded in an automobile or airplane accident caused by a hostile action or crisis situation.
(c) Employee is killed or wounded by a land mine, trap, bomb or chemical/biological agent, even if not targeted at the employee or the United States.

(3) Natural disasters linked to service:

(a) Employee is killed or wounded while away from the mission, but while performing official duties, e.g., an earthquake abroad causes a building to collapse, killing several employees who are negotiating an arms control treaty; or
(b) Employee is killed or injured at the mission, e.g., a flood strikes a U.S. Embassy compound, killing and injuring dozens of employees.

(4) Nothing in this Foreign Affairs Manual shall limit the discretion of the Secretary to recommend the Foreign Service Star Award for an otherwise eligible and deserving employee.

== Nominating and approval procedures ==
Nominations for the Thomas Jefferson Star for Foreign Service must be initiated by the chief of mission or by an assistant secretary, cleared by the medical director, as appropriate, and then submitted to the Department Awards Committee for review and recommendation to the secretary. The secretary shall make final recommendations to the president.

== Effective date ==
The effective date for the Thomas Jefferson Star for Foreign Service shall be August 7, 1998.

An employee or surviving next of kin may petition the Department Awards Committee to consider individuals who are eligible and deserving of the Thomas Jefferson Star for Foreign Service notwithstanding the fact that the illness, injury or death occurred prior to the effective date.

== Military use ==
Active duty military are not eligible to receive this award.

== Recipients ==
- Diane Berry Caves, public health professional, DHHS Centers for Disease Control and Prevention, Port-au-Prince, Haiti, January 12, 2010, earthquake
- Kathey-Lee Galvin, foreign service officer, Department of State, Port-au-Prince, Haiti, January 12, 2010, earthquake
- John Granville, democracy officer, USAID, Juba, Sudan, July 14, 2008, attack
- Abdelrahman Abbas Rahama, foreign service national, USAID, Juba, Sudan, July 14, 2008, attack
- Steven Farley, member of US Navy Reserve, U.S. Department of State, Sadr City, Iraq, June 24, 2008, terrorist attack
- Kellie Lartigue-Ndiaye, country director, DHHS Centers for Disease Control and Prevention, Togo, Mali, December 21, 2007, vehicle accident
- Margaret Alexander, deputy mission director, USAID, Kathmandu, Nepal, September 23, 2006, helicopter crash
- Bijnan Acharya, environmental officer, USAID, Kathmandu, Nepal, September 23, 2006, helicopter crash
- Stephen Eric "Sully" Sullivan, foreign service special agent, U.S. Diplomatic Security Service, Mosul, Iraq, September 19, 2005, terrorist attack
- Edward Seitz, foreign service special agent, U.S. Diplomatic Security Service, Baghdad, Iraq, October 24, 2004, mortar attack
- Paul Converse, auditor, Office of the Special Inspector General for Iraq Reconstruction, Baghdad, Iraq, March 30, 2008, terrorist attack
- Mustafa Akarsu, security, Turkish embassy employee, Ankara, Turkey, February 1, 2013, terrorist attack
- Sean Smith, information management officer, Benghazi US Consulate, terrorist attack
- Joyce Ann Reed, information management office manager, US Department of State, Nairobi, Kenya, August 7, 1998, Al Qaeda East African Bombings.
- Worley (Lee) Reed, special agent / security engineering officer, US Department of State, Nairobi, Kenya, August 7, 1998, Al Qaeda East African Bombings.
- J. Christopher Stevens, U.S. Ambassador to Libya killed in a terrorist attack.
- Dr. Edward Howard Winant, USAID Engineering Officer, died in Bangkok, November 22, 2022.

== See also ==
- Awards of the United States Department of State
- Awards and decorations of the United States government
- United States Department of State
- U.S. Foreign Service
