= State Department Award for Valor =

Award for Valor
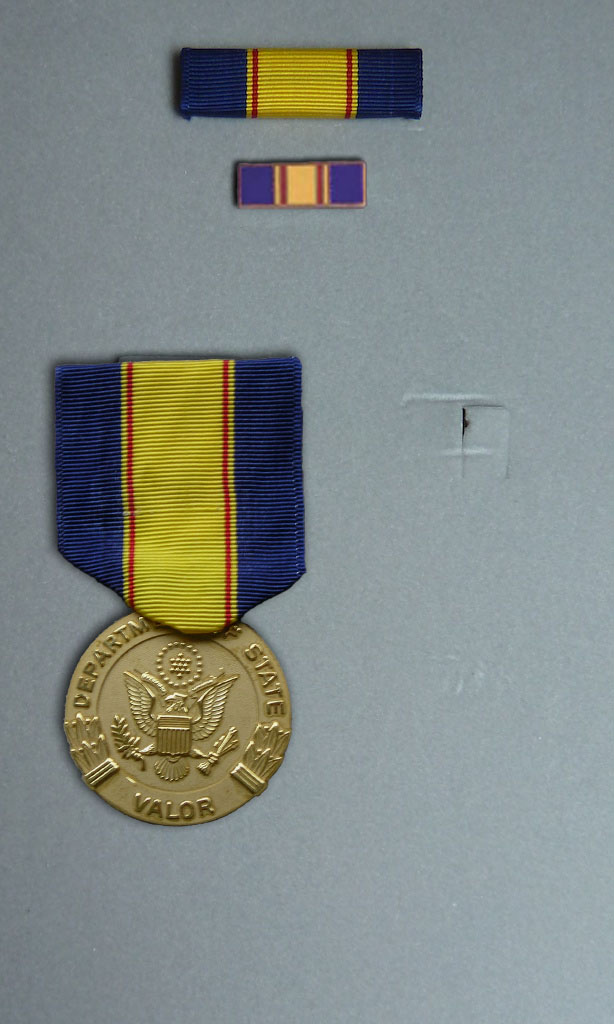
- Type: Military medal
- Awarded for: "Acts of valor or outstanding performance under unusually difficult or dangerous circumstances"
- Presented by: United States Department of State
- Eligibility: Foreign Service, Civil Service, US Military
- Status: Obsolete, replaced with the Award for Heroism
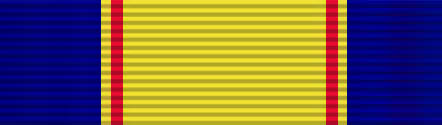
- Ribbon

Precedence
- Next (higher): Award for Heroism
- Next (lower): Thomas Jefferson Star for Foreign Service

The Award for Valor is an obsolete award of the United States Department of State. It has since been replaced with the Award for Heroism. It was presented to employees of State, USAID and Marine guards assigned to diplomatic and consular facilities in recognition of acts of valor or outstanding performance under unusually difficult or dangerous circumstances, whether or not in connection with the performance of assigned duties.

The award consisted of a gold medal set and a certificate signed by an assistant secretary, an official of equivalent rank or the Chief of Mission.

The basic difference between the Award for Valor and the Award for Heroism is that the Valor Award was issued in 10K gold whereas the Heroism Award is issued in sterling silver. The ribbon reflects this; the designs are almost identical, but the color scheme indicates the precious metal issued with the respective awards.

== Criteria ==
The following criteria were applicable to granting an Award for Valor:

- Sustained superior performance while under threat of physical attack or harassment; or
- An individual act of valor or exceptional performance at the risk of personal safety.

== Military use ==
Upon authorization, members of the U.S. military may wear the medal and ribbon in the appropriate order of precedence as a U.S. non-military personal decoration.

== Recipients ==
- All State Department and CIA employees taken hostage during the Iran hostage crisis. Political Officer Michael J. Metrinko received two: one for his time as a hostage and another for his daring rescue of Americans who had been jailed in Tabriz months before the embassy takeover.
- Alvin P. Adams, former U.S. Ambassador, for acts of heroism to protect the safety and well-being of President Aristide during the September, 1991 coup in Haiti.
- Barbara Bodine, former U.S. Ambassador to Yemen, for her work in occupied Kuwait.
- Douglas K. Ramsey, former U.S. Foreign Service officer and one of the few State Department employees held as a prisoner of war during the Vietnam War.
- Ryan C. Crocker, former U.S. Ambassador to Iraq

== See also ==
- Awards of the United States Department of State
- Awards and decorations of the United States government
- United States Department of State
- U.S. Foreign Service
- Iran Hostage Crisis
