= Awards of the United States Department of State =

Types of awards given by US Department of State

The United States Department of State, like other agencies of the U.S. federal government, gives civilian decorations for outstanding service, sacrifice, or heroism. The criteria for the awards are set down in 3 FAM 4820 - Foreign Affairs Manual, 3 FAM - Personnel, section 3 FAM 4800 Department Awards Program.

State Department awards are broken down into four types: honor awards, achievement awards, service awards, and recognition awards. In addition, there are awards which are no longer given but for which certificates, ribbons, or medals may still be occasionally seen.

The Foreign Affairs Manual described the purpose of Department of State honor awards as to "bestow recognition on an individual or group who has made a significant contribution to the agency's mission" and states that "The honor awards vary in scope and magnitude. The impact of the act or deed which precipitates the nomination must be carefully examined, and consideration given to whether the act to be recognized benefits the post or bureau, the area, the agency, or the Federal Government as a whole." Upon authorization, members of the U.S. military may wear the medal and ribbon in the appropriate order of precedence as a U.S. non-military personal decoration.

As delineated in numerous diplomatic cables describing each one, achievement awards recognize specific service over the previous year in a specific field or job category. The majority of the awards include a certificate, signed by the Secretary of State and a cash bonus. The cash bonuses range from zero to $10,000. Some awards are sponsored by private donors, who are often former members of the Foreign Service. There is a minimum requirement for several valid nominations in a category in order for some awards to be presented; if there are insufficient nominees or the nominations do not meet a specific threshold, then no award is presented that year. Currently, none of the achievement awards includes a medal set.

Service awards are common for the Armed Forces but are not currently favored by the Director General of the Foreign Service. The Department of State currently awards two service awards, the Secretary's Career Achievement Award and the Expeditionary Service Award. The Expeditionary Service Award is a new award as of 2011 that recognizes service by Civil and Foreign Service employees in areas designated by the Director General of the Foreign Service.

== Honor awards ==
Honor awards bestow recognition on an individual or group who has made a significant contribution to the Department’s mission. The honor awards vary in scope and magnitude. The impact of the act or deed which precipitates the nomination is carefully examined, and consideration is given to whether the act to be recognized benefits the post or bureau, the area, the Department of State, or the Federal Government as a whole.

=== Secretary's Distinguished Service Award ===
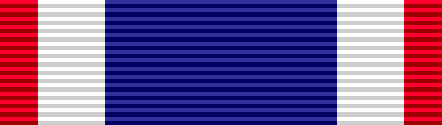
Ribbon of the Secretary's Distinguished Service Award

The Secretary's Distinguished Service Award is presented at the discretion of the Secretary of State in recognition of exceptionally outstanding leadership, professional competence, and significant accomplishment over a sustained period of time in the field of foreign affairs. Such achievements must be of notable national or international significance and have made an important contribution to the advancement of U.S. national interests.

The award is personally authorized by the Secretary of State provided that one of the criteria eligibility in Foreign Affairs Manual is met. It may be presented to members of the foreign affairs communities.

The award consists of a gold medal set and a certificate signed by the Secretary.

=== Secretary's Award ===
Ribbon of the Secretary's Award

The Secretary's Award is "presented to employees of State, USAID, and Marine guards assigned to diplomatic and consular facilities in recognition of sacrifice of health or life, in the performance of official duties." This award could be presented to members of the foreign affairs communities who were held hostage or captive while serving overseas on official orders.

The award consists of a medal set and a certificate signed by the Secretary.

Nominations for the Secretary's Award are submitted through supervisory channels to the Joint Country Awards Committee for review and recommendation to the chief of mission. Approved nominations will be forwarded through the appropriate area awards committee to the Department Awards Committee for final action. Nominations initiated in Washington are submitted through the appropriate area awards committee to the Department Awards Committee for final action.

=== Award for Heroism ===
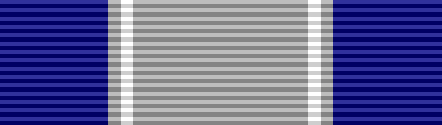
Ribbon of the Award for Heroism

The Award for Heroism is given "recognition of acts of courage or outstanding performance under unusually difficult or dangerous circumstances, whether or not in connection with the performance of assigned duties."

It may be granted for: (1) Sustained superior performance while under threat of physical attack or harassment; or (2) An individual act of courage or exceptional performance at the risk of personal safety.

The award consists of a sterling silver medal set and a certificate signed by the Secretary.

Nominations for the Award for Heroism are submitted through supervisory channels to the Joint Country Awards Committee for review and recommendation to the chief of mission. Approved nominations will be forwarded through the appropriate area awards committee to the Department Awards Committee for final action. Nominations initiated in Washington are submitted through the appropriate area awards committee to the Department Awards Committee for final action.

Due to the nature of their jobs and the dangerous environment where they often operate, Foreign Service Special Agents of the Diplomatic Security Service have earned this award on numerous occasions.

=== Thomas Jefferson Star for Foreign Service ===
Ribbon of the Thomas Jefferson Star for Foreign Service

The Thomas Jefferson Star for Foreign Service "recognizes those individuals who, while traveling or serving abroad on official business, are killed or incur a serious illness or injury that results in death, permanent incapacity or disability." It is roughly analogous to the Purple Heart, though it is almost always issued posthumously due to the strict requirements.

a. The Thomas Jefferson Star for Foreign Service recognizes those individuals who, while traveling or serving abroad on official business, are killed or incur a serious illness or injury that results in death, permanent incapacity or disability.

b. The award consists of a Foreign Service Star Medal and a certificate signed by the President and the Secretary.

c. Posthumous awards shall be issued to the recipient employee's next of kin.

The award consists of a gold medal set and a certificate signed by the Secretary and the President.

=== Distinguished Honor Award ===
Ribbon of the Distinguished Honor Award

The Distinguished Honor Award is awarded to individuals or groups that provide:

(1) Exceptionally outstanding service to the agencies or the U.S. Government resulting in achievements of marked national or international significance;
(2) Exceptionally outstanding service and/or leadership in the administration of one or more agency programs that results in the highly successful accomplishment of mission, or in a major attainment of objectives or specific accomplishment to meet unique or emergency situations; and
(3) Outstanding accomplishments over a prolonged period that involve the exercise of authority or judgment in the public interest.

The award consists of a gold medal set and a certificate signed, as appropriate, by the Secretary of State. Due to the strict requirements of this award, only two members of the Foreign Service below the rank of Ambassador have ever been personally honored with this award.

=== Superior Honor Award ===
Ribbon of the Superior Honor Award

The Superior Honor Award is presented to groups or individuals in recognition of a special act or service or sustained extraordinary performance covering a period of one year or longer. The following criteria are applicable to granting a Superior Honor Award:

(1) Contributions, which had a substantial impact on the accomplishment of the agency's missions, goals, or objectives;
(2) Accomplishments, which substantially contributed to the advancement of U.S. Government interests;
(3) Exceptional performance in one or more areas of the employee’s official duties as defined in the Work Requirements Statement (Foreign Service) or Performance Plan (Civil Service);
(4) Innovation and creativity in accomplishing long-term tasks or projects;
(5) Contributions that resulted in increased productivity and efficiency, and economy of operations at agency level; and/or
(6) Exceptional devotion to duty under adverse conditions.

The award consists of a certificate signed by an assistant secretary or an official of equivalent rank. The silver medal set is no longer awarded.

=== Meritorious Honor Award ===
Ribbon of the Meritorious Honor Award

The Meritorious Honor Award is presented to groups or individuals in recognition of a special act or service or sustained outstanding performance. The following criteria are applicable to granting a Meritorious Honor Award:

(1) Outstanding service in support of a one-time event (e.g., support for a major conference or summit meeting);
(2) Innovation and creativity in accomplishing short-term tasks or projects;
(3) Outstanding performance in one or more areas of the employee’s official duties as defined in the Work Requirements Statement (Foreign Service) or Performance Plan (Civil Service); and/or
(4) Contributions that resulted in increased productivity and efficiency, and economy of operations at post or bureau level.

The award consists of a certificate signed by an assistant secretary or an official of equivalent rank. The bronze medal set is no longer awarded.

== Achievement Awards ==
As delineated in numerous diplomatic cables describing each one, achievement awards recognize specific service over the previous year in a specific field or job category. The majority of the awards include a certificate, signed by the Secretary of State and a cash bonus. The cash bonuses range from zero to $10,000. Many of the awards were sponsored by private donors, who are often formerly members of the Foreign Service, but the nominations for the awards still go through the Department of State’s awards committee each year.

=== Secretary's Award for Excellence in International Security Affairs ===
The award recognizes individual excellence in the development, negotiation and/or implementation of national policy and solutions to counter country-specific, regional and/or global nonproliferation, counter-proliferation, political-military, arms control, verification, and/or noncompliance challenges facing the United States. The winner receives a certificate signed by the Secretary of State and a $10,000 stipend and the runner-up receives a signed certificate and a $2,000 stipend.

=== Award for Excellence in Labor Diplomacy ===
The award recognizes Civil and Foreign Service personnel who emphasize the importance of labor diplomacy in promoting the values and ideals of American democracy abroad and illustrate the variety of tasks Labor Officers perform. The winner receives $10,000 and a certificate signed by the Secretaries of State and Labor. The runner-up receives $2,500 and a certificate signed by the Secretaries of State and Labor.

=== James A. Baker III – C. Howard Wilkins, Jr. Award for Outstanding Deputy Chief of Mission ===
This award is presented annually to a Deputy Chief of Mission who demonstrates the proficiency, creativity, and overall capacity to serve effectively as Deputy Chief of Mission and as Chargé d'Affaires in the Ambassador's absence. The award consists of a certificate signed by the Secretary of State and $5,000. This award is made possible by C. Howard Wilkins, Jr., former U.S. Ambassador to the Netherlands, and is named to honor him and former Secretary of State James A. Baker, III.

=== Warren Christopher Award for Outstanding Achievement in Global Affairs ===
This award, initiated in 1997 and named in honor of former Secretary of State Warren Christopher, recognizes sustained excellence and initiative in the substantive policy areas of oceans, the environment, and science; democracy, human rights, and labor; population, migration, and refugees; and international narcotics and crime. The award consists of a certificate signed by the Secretary of State and $10,000.

=== Civil Service Secretary of the Year ===
This annual award recognizes the high standards of performance which characterize the work of Civil Service Secretaries in the department and abroad. It is granted annually to one Civil Service Secretary whose performance is judged by a selection committee to exemplify most clearly these high standards. The recipient receives a certificate signed by the Secretary of State and $10,000. In addition, the recipients’ names are placed on a plaque in the department.

=== Charles E. Cobb Jr. Award for Initiative and Success in Trade Development ===
This award, made possible by the support of former Ambassador to Iceland, Charles E. Cobb, is presented to career members of the Foreign Service serving in an ambassadorial appointment for noteworthy success in developing trade between other nations and the United States. The award consists of a certificate signed by the Secretary of State and $10,000.

=== Sue M. Cobb Award for Exemplary Diplomatic Service ===
The Sue M. Cobb Award for Exemplary Diplomatic Service is presented to a Non-Career Ambassador who (a) has used private sector leadership and management skills to make a significant impact on bilateral or multilateral relations and (b) has done so in a manner that best reflects the foreign service culture of uncommon commitment in carrying out United States foreign policy through proactive diplomacy. The award is made possible by the generosity of Sue M. Cobb, former U.S. Ambassador to Jamaica. The honoree receives a certificate signed by the Secretary. The honoree's Embassy and the Leadership and Management School of the Foreign Service Institute each receive $5,000. The first recipient was David C. Mulford in 2007.

=== Ryan C. Crocker Award for Outstanding Leadership in Expeditionary Diplomacy ===
This award was established by Secretary Hillary Clinton to honor Career Ambassador Ryan C. Crocker, former ambassador to Lebanon, Kuwait, Pakistan, and Iraq, and first Chargé at the reopened U.S. Embassy in Afghanistan. The award recognizes those who excel in the most challenging leadership positions overseas. The winner, if an employee of the agencies covered by the Foreign Affairs Manual, receives a certificate signed by the Secretary of State and $10,000. In accordance with 3 FAM 4813.2(c), the winner, if a member of the military, may only receive the certificate.

=== Robert C. Bannerman Diplomatic Security Employee of the Year ===
Named after the first person in charge of the predecessor agency that eventually became the Bureau of Diplomatic Security in 1985, this award is presented to a member of the Civil or Foreign Service serving in the Bureau of Diplomatic Security for outstanding contributions in support of the Bureau's mission. The recipient receives a cash award of $10,000 and a certificate signed by the Secretary of State.

=== Special Agent Daniel E. O'Conner Memorial Award for Excellence in Site Security Management ===
The award is named in honor of Daniel E. O'Connor, who died in the terrorist bombing of Pan Am Flight 103 over Lockerbie, Scotland, in 1988. The award recognizes superior professional performance and outstanding leadership in the challenging field of site security management.

=== Director General’s Award for Impact and Originality in Reporting ===
This award is conferred in recognition of the high standards that characterize the Department's reporting, analysis, and advocacy efforts. The recipient receives a certificate signed by the Secretary of State, $10,000, and an engraved desk pen set. The recipients’ names are engraved on a plaque that is permanently displayed in the department.

=== James Clement Dunn Award for Excellence ===
This award was established in 1980 to recognize exemplary performance in the Department of State at the mid-career level. It is made possible by an endowment from the Vincent Astor Foundation and is named, at the request of the donor, in memory of Ambassador James Clement Dunn. Ambassador Dunn retired from the Service in 1956 with the rank of Career Ambassador. The recipient receives a certificate signed by the Secretary of State and $10,000. The James Clement Dunn Award for Excellence recognizes leadership, intellectual skills, managerial ability, and personal qualities that most fully exemplify the standards of excellence desired of officers at the mid-career level.

=== Equal Employment Opportunity Award ===
This annual award recognizes the outstanding accomplishments (by a Foreign Service or a Civil Service employee) in furthering the goals of the Department's EEO program through exceptionally effective leadership, skill, imagination, and innovation in extending and promoting equal opportunities for all employees. The award consists of a certificate signed by the Secretary of State and $10,000.

=== Cordell Hull Award for Economic Achievement by Senior Officers ===
The Cordell Hull Award for Economic Achievement by a Senior Officer is made possible by former U.S. Ambassador to Singapore, Steven J. Green. It recognizes outstanding contributions by a senior level State Department employee in advancing U.S. interests in the international economic field. The recipient of the award receives a certificate signed by the Secretary of State and $10,000.

The award is given based on the quality of the nominee’s overall contribution in advancing U.S. international economic relations and objectives; documented economic leadership, advocacy, analytical, reporting or negotiating skills, or a combination thereof; and creative thinking influencing economic policy formulation.

=== Leamon R. Hunt Award for Management Excellence ===
This award is given to a Department of State officer serving in a management position who has made notable contributions to the efficiency and quality of services at post. The award consists of a certificate signed by the Secretary and $10,000.

=== Swanee Hunt Award for Advancing Women’s Role in Policy Formulation ===
These awards specifically recognize achievements in the area of promoting women as participants in the political and economic processes or as policy shapers. An annual stipend of $10,000 will be given in two awards of $5,000 each: one to a Foreign Service or Civil Service employee and one to a Foreign Service National at a U.S. Embassy or Consulate.

=== Foreign Service National of the Year Award ===
The FSN of the Year Award is given in recognition of the value to the U.S. Government through special contributions made by Department of State Foreign Service National (FSN) employees hired under direct hire appointments and personal service agreements at U.S. diplomatic posts abroad. Annually, each Regional Bureau nominates one candidate, which is the Bureau FSN of the Year winner. Each winner's outstanding performance is recognized via a bureau award consisting of a signed certificate, and cash award. The individual selected as Department FSN of the Year receives a certificate signed by the Secretary of State and a cash award of $10,000. The remaining five Regional Bureaus winners/runners up will receive a certificate signed by the Assistant Secretary of their respective Regional Bureau and a cash award of $2,500.

The following factors will be considered by each Regional Bureau in selecting its nominee, and by the department's panel in selecting the FSN of the Year. Outstanding achievement in any one of the areas listed below, or combination thereof, may justify selection.

- Significant contributions which support understanding of American foreign policy interests overseas.
- Outstanding examples of liaison with host country officials and others, which facilitated the work of American officers or goals of the mission.
- Exceptional initiative in the defense of U.S. property or colleagues or American citizens.
- Performance of assigned duties that were clearly instrumental in the achievement of major mission goals and objectives that without success would have been uncertain or seriously delayed.
- Special effectiveness in bridging national differences which enhanced the introduction of American staff members into professional, cultural, or personal relationships with host country nationals and contributed to effective representation.
- Personal or professional courage in difficult, demanding or hardship situations.

=== Sean Smith Innovation in the Use of Technology Award ===
This award is presented to an exceptional employee in the Foreign Service or the Civil Service serving domestically or abroad except those with specific job responsibilities for the management, development, implementation, or support of computer technology. The award consists of a certificate signed by the Secretary of State and $10,000.

=== Linguist of the Year Award ===
This award is presented to a member of the Foreign Service who demonstrates unusual mastery of a world or difficult language while studying at the Foreign Service Institute. The award consists of a certificate signed by the Secretary and $10,000.

=== Frank E. Loy Award for Environmental Diplomacy ===
This award, established as a legacy to the department and its employees by Frank E. Loy, former Under Secretary for Global Affairs, recognizes achievement in international environmental affairs, including advancement of U.S. interests, analysis and policy development, integration into overall U.S. diplomacy efforts, and interaction with the public and private sectors. The award consists of a certificate signed by the Secretary of State and $5,000.

=== Thomas Morrison Information Management Award ===
This award is presented to an exceptional employee of the Foreign Service or the civil service (except Senior Foreign Service and senior executive service) in the information management field, serving domestically or abroad. The award consists of a certificate signed by the secretary of state and $10,000.

=== Award for Excellence in International Security Affairs ===
This award specifically recognizes individual excellence in the development, negotiation and/or implementation of national policy and solutions to counter country-specific, regional and/or global nonproliferation, counter-proliferation, political-military, arms control, verification and/or noncompliance challenges facing the United States. A signed certificate and stipend of $5,000 will be awarded to the Foreign Service employee and the Civil Service employee respectively, whose contributions best meet the selection criteria. The runner-up Foreign Service employee and Civil Service employee would each receive an award of $1,000 and signed certificate.

The selection panel will determine award recipients on the basis of the following criteria:

- The quality of the employee's contributions to the development, negotiation and/or implementation of strategies and programs to advance United States' nonproliferation, counter-proliferation, political-military, arms control, verification and/or compliance agenda. The impact of the employee's efforts will be a primary consideration in this regard.
- Demonstrated leadership, initiative and creativity in creating sustainable and effective approaches to meet specific State Department priorities in one or more of the areas specified above. Demonstrated excellence in developing accessible and representative contacts (e.g., within relevant governments, military organizations, multilateral institutions, NGOs, academia, elites and/or the media) and successfully engaging them to advance the U.S. agenda in one or more of the areas specified above.
- Demonstrated excellence in reporting on and/or analyzing foreign attitudes as they affect U.S. policy in one or more of the areas specified above and using this information and analysis to advance U.S. priorities.
- Demonstrated success in working effectively with colleagues in other bureaus and agencies, foreign government officials and representatives from international organizations, non-governmental organizations and the private sector to achieve U.S. Transformational Diplomacy objectives in one or more of the areas specified above.

=== Edward R. Murrow Award for Excellence in Public Diplomacy ===
This award recognizes significant contributions in the field of public diplomacy and the special qualities that reflect the integrity, courage, sensitivity, vision, and dedication to excellence that were so highly exemplified in the life of Edward R. Murrow, the Director of the United States Information Agency from 1961 to 1964. The winner of the award receives a plaque presented during the commencement exercises at the Fletcher School, Tufts University. The winner also receives $10,000, which is presented at the annual Departmental Awards Ceremony held at the State Department.

Selection will be based on the nominee's:

- Integrity of character and adherence to firm standards of truth and principle;
- Outstanding performance and good judgment under stressful conditions; and
- Creative use of communications skills with foreign audiences.

=== Office Management Specialist of the Year Award ===
This annual award recognizes the high standards of performance which characterize the work of Foreign Service Office Management Specialists in the department and abroad. It is granted annually to one Foreign Service OMS whose performance is judged by a selection committee to exemplify most clearly these high standards. The recipient receives a certificate signed by the Secretary of State and $10,000. In addition, the recipients’ names are placed on a plaque in the department.

=== Arnold Lewis Raphel Memorial Award ===
This annual award is named in honor of Ambassador Raphel and recognizes the special qualities that he brought to both U.S. diplomacy and the work of the Foreign Service. The award is granted to an individual in international affairs who embodies the special human qualities and extra effort put forth by Ambassador Raphel to promote and develop the people around him, especially entry-level officers. The award consists of a certificate signed by the Secretary of State and $10,000.

=== Luther I. Replogle Award for Management Improvement ===
This award was made possible by an endowment established by Luther I. Replogle, former American ambassador to Iceland. It is granted to an employee of the Department of State or the U.S. Agency for International Development who has made an outstanding contribution to management improvement. The recipient receives a certificate signed by the Secretary of State and $10,000.

=== Mary A. Ryan Award for Outstanding Public Service ===
This award recognizes achievement and extraordinary leadership in the provision of services to U.S. citizens domestically as well as abroad. The award consists of a certificate signed by the Secretary of State and $10,000.

=== Herbert Salzman Award for Excellence in International Economic Performance ===
This award is made possible by Herbert Salzman, former U.S. Ambassador to the U.S. Mission to the Organization for Economic Cooperation and Development. It recognizes outstanding contributions in advancing U.S. international relations and objectives in the economic field. The award consists of a certificate signed by the Secretary of State and $5,000.

=== Rockwell Anthony Schnabel Award for Advancing U.S.-EU Relations ===
The Rockwell Anthony Schnabel Award for Advancing U.S.-EU Relations was initiated in 2004 and named in honor of former Ambassador Schnabel, recognizes outstanding efforts in advancing U.S. policy objectives through cooperation with the EU. The winner of the award receives a certificate signed by the Secretary of State, and $5,000.

Selection will be based on:

- The quality of the nominee’s overall contribution in advancing US policy objectives through cooperation with the European Union (EU);
- Conceptual thinking influencing economic or political policy formulation; and
- The candidate’s ability to foster good US-EU relations with contacts working within institutions of the EU, within EU member states or within EU candidate states.

=== Barbara M. Watson Award for Consular Excellence ===
This award is made in recognition of outstanding contributions to consular operations. The award consists of a certificate signed by the Secretary of State and $10,000.

=== Robert C. Frasure Memorial Award ===
This award is presented to the department employee who most exemplifies the late Ambassador's commitment to peace and the alleviation of human suffering caused by war or civil injustice. The recipient receives a certificate signed by the Secretary of State and $10,000.

=== David E. Foy Memorial Award for Excellence in Facility Management ===
The award is named on behalf of David E. Foy, who was killed by a car bomb in Karachi, Pakistan, in March, 2006. The award recognizes the recipient's achievements in the field of facilities management and is presented to the individual whose facility management program demonstrated exceptional leadership, sound management practices, and furthered the goals of the mission and OBO.

=== Foreign Service Construction Engineer of the Year Award ===
The award recognizes the recipient's achievements in the field of construction management and considers the following factors: projects supported by the nominee, accomplishments in the field of construction management, actions taken on the job or in the community that exemplify the positive spirit that all FSCEs should strive for, and extenuating circumstances that the nominee managed effectively.

=== Value Engineering Achievement Award ===
The Value Engineering Awards Program is an acknowledgment of exemplary achievements and encourages additional projects to improve in-house and contractor productivity. Award winners from each DoD component are eligible for selection in the following five categories: program/project, individual, team, organization, and contractor. Additional "special" awards are given to recognize innovative applications or approaches that expand the traditional scope of value engineering use.

== Service Awards ==
In addition to the awards listed below, other government agencies may make awards to individuals who fall under the State Department's awards program.

=== Expeditionary Service Award ===
The "Expeditionary Service Award" (ESA) was created in 2011 for employees who have successfully completed an assignment to designated field locations. Current field locations that confer eligibility for this award include Iraq and Afghanistan. Those who have served previously will receive their awards once their service records are verified.

The Expeditionary Service Award will include a citation signed by the Secretary, as well as an engraved medal or pin. It will also be noted in the official performance files for career Foreign Service and Civil Service employees.

=== Secretary’s Career Achievement Award ===
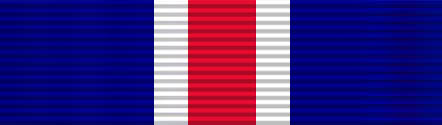
Ribbon of the Secretary’s Career Achievement Award

This award is presented to members of the Foreign Service upon retirement after 25 or more years of service with the U.S. Department of State. It was initially issued as the Wilbur J. Carr Award, named after former Minister Carr, who has been referred to as the "father of the Foreign Service." Minister Carr served as the head of the legation to the former Czechoslovakia in 1937 before the mission was closed.

The medal was later changed to be the Secretary's Career Achievement Award, and although the medal itself changed, the ribbon retained the same color scheme. The award consists of a gold medal set and a certificate signed by the Secretary. Medal sets have not been issued since 2007.

== Recognition awards ==
Recognition awards are awards that can be issued to members of the Civil or Foreign Service and Foreign Service Nationals/Locally Employed Staff. The award consists of a certificate signed by the approving official, usually a supervisor or someone of higher rank, and may include a cash award.

=== Franklin Award ===
The Franklin Award, named for Benjamin Franklin in honor of his distinguished service as a public servant and U.S. diplomat, recognizes the achievements of individuals in a variety of areas of importance to the department. It consists of a framed certificate, typically signed by the Chief of Mission or Office Director. It may also include a cash award from $200 to $750. Receipt of a Franklin Award is no longer included in a Foreign Service employee’s official personnel file, since it does not qualify as an honor award.

=== Extra Mile Award ===
The intention of the Extra Mile Award is to provide supervisors a mechanism to immediately recognize employees whose work performance merits recognition, but which may fall below the threshold for a Franklin Award or one of the honor awards. A cash award is usually included, ranging from $25 to $200 in increments of $25.

=== Time Off From Duty Award ===
Just as its name implies, the Time Off From Duty Award recognizes special acts or other efforts that contribute to the quality, efficiency, or economy of U.S. Government operations. Time off from duty is granted without loss of pay or charge to leave.

=== Length of Service Award ===
The Length-of-Service Award gives recognition to creditable service with the U.S. Government. For a Length of Service Award, a certificate, and lapel emblem are issued for between 10 and 50 years of service, depending on the agency.

=== Safe Driving Award ===
The Safe Driving Award is given to full-time drivers for safety and ability. Employees who have driven one or more years without a preventable accident and whose performance is otherwise highly satisfactory and who meet standards and decisions of the National Safety Council regarding preventable and non-preventable accidents are eligible for consideration. Only Foreign Service National drivers employed full-time in a driving skillcode are eligible for this award.

=== Certificate of Appreciation ===
The Certificate of Appreciation recognizes general contributions that further the objectives of the department. All employees, regardless of pay plan or rank, members of other agencies and the armed services, and private citizens and foreign officials are eligible for the Certificate of Appreciation.

== Discontinued Awards ==
=== Award for Valor ===
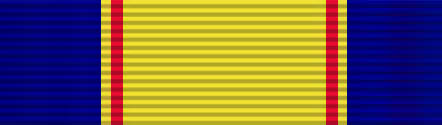
Ribbon of the Award for Valor

This award has been discontinued and has been replaced by the Department of State Award for Heroism.

The original medal was solid gold. It had "Department of State" inscribed across the top and "Valor" inscribed across the bottom. There were laurels along the side, and in the center was the Great Seal of the United States. There was a period of time when the recipients' name was inscribed across the back.

Notable recipients include Donald J. Cooke, L. Bruce Laingen, John W. Limbert Jr., Alan B. Golacinski, and Barry M. Rosen, all of whom spent 444 days as hostages after Iranian activists took over the U.S. Embassy in Tehran in November 1979.

=== Vietnam Civilian Service Award ===
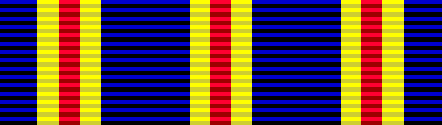
Ribbon of the VCSA

The "Vietnam Civilian Service Award" (VCSA) was created in 1962 to commemorate members of the U.S. Foreign Service (including State, USAID, and USIA) who served a total of one year or more in Vietnam while working for a foreign service agency.

The Vietnam Civilian Service Award includes a medal set and a certificate signed by the Secretary. The award is no longer being issued.

=== John Jacob Rogers Award ===
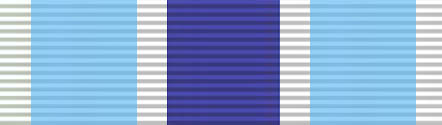
Ribbon of the John Jacob Rogers Award

This award has been discontinued and has been replaced by the Department of State Secretary’s Career Achievement Award. It was named for Congressman John Jacob Rogers, for whom the Rogers Act of 1926 is named. The Rogers Act consolidated the diplomatic and consular officers into one Diplomatic Corps, which is now the Foreign Service.

The original medal was sterling silver with the text "John Jacob Rogers Award" inscribed across the top, "U.S. Department of State" across the bottom, and the Great Seal of the United States superimposed over a globe surrounded by laurel wreath.

== Display of Awards ==
Although the Foreign Service is not part of the Uniformed Service of the United States, like many other federal civilian branches, awards and medals are presented to its civilian employees and may be displayed under appropriate circumstances. Foreign Service officers are prohibited from accepting decorations from foreign governments without Congressional authorization. If someone wishes to wear war service decorations or civilian medals at formal day or evening events, they should check with the protocol officer. If appropriate, wear them on the left lapel or over the left breast pocket, U.S. military medals above U.S. civilian medals. Ribbons may be worn on military uniforms per DOD regulations concerning the display of U.S. non-military personal decorations.

=== Order of precedence ===
The order of precedence for Department of State awards for active duty Civil and Foreign Service personnel, for display purposes, is as follows. For individuals who are serving in active or reserve military duty and in uniform, they would follow the appropriate military order of precedence.

1. U.S. military heroism personal decorations (Medal of Honor, Service Crosses)
2. U.S. government personal decorations issued by the President or Congress
3. Secretary’s Distinguished Service Award
4. Secretary’s Award
5. U.S. military distinguished service personal decorations for valor (DSMs, Silver Star, Legion of Merit, etc.)
6. Award for Heroism
7. Award for Valor (no longer issued; replaced with the Award for Heroism)
8. Thomas Jefferson Star for Foreign Service (formerly the Foreign Service Star)
9. U.S. government personal decorations for valor (Intelligence Star, DOD Medal of Valor, DHS Award for Valor, etc.)
10. U.S. military other personal decorations for valor
11. Distinguished Honor Award
12. U.S. military non-combat heroism personal decorations (Soldier's Medal, Purple Heart, MSM, Lifesaving Medals, etc.)
13. U.S. military distinguished service personal decorations (not for valor)
14. U.S. government first-order personal decorations (National Intelligence DSM, DOD Distinguished Civilian Service Award, etc.)
15. Superior Honor Award
16. U.S. military commendation personal decorations (Army Commendation Medal, etc.)
17. U.S. government second-order personal decorations (Navy Superior Civilian Service Award, etc.)
18. Meritorious Honor Award
19. Personal U.S. government decorations for current or previous government service, including personal military awards not listed above (Air Force Achievement Medal, etc.)
20. U.S. government third-order personal decorations (Navy Meritorious Civilian Service Award, etc.)
21. Vietnam Civilian Service Award
22. Expeditionary Service Award
23. Secretary’s Career Achievement Award (also briefly known as the Wilbur J. Carr Award)
24. John Jacob Rogers Award (no longer issued; replaced with the Secretary’s Career Achievement Award)
25. Group U.S. government decorations for current or previous government service, including group or unit military awards (Presidential Unit Citations, Meritorious Unit Commendations, Superior Unit Awards, etc.)
26. Public Service Award
27. U.S. military good conduct medals
28. U.S. military campaign, service, and training medals
29. U.S. government service awards for current or previous government service, including military service awards
30. Foreign and international personal awards, in order of date of receipt

== See also ==
- Awards and decorations of the United States government
- Diplomatic Security Bannerman Employee of the Year Award Winners
- Diplomatic Security Heroism Award Recipients
- U.S. Foreign Service
- United States Department of State
