= Secretary's Distinguished Service Award =

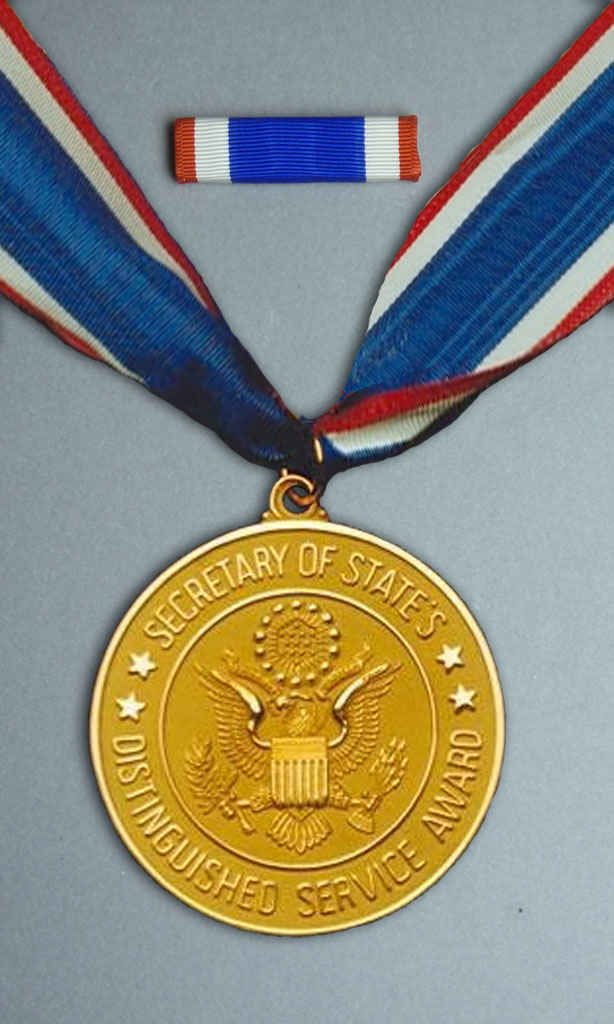
- Type: Military medal
- Awarded for: "Recognition of exceptionally outstanding leadership, professional competence, and significant accomplishment over a sustained period of time in the field of foreign affairs"
- Presented by: United States Department of State
- Eligibility: Foreign Service, Civil Service, U.S. military, civilians
- Status: Currently awarded
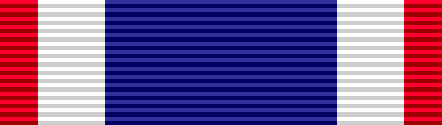
- Ribbon

Precedence
- Next (lower): Secretary’s Award

The Secretary's Distinguished Service Award is an award of the United States Department of State. It is presented at the discretion of the secretary of state in recognition of exceptionally outstanding leadership, professional competence, and significant accomplishment over a sustained period of time in the field of foreign affairs. Such achievements must be of notable national or international significance and have made an important contribution to the advancement of U.S. national interests.

The award is personally authorized by the secretary of state provided that one of the criteria eligibility in Foreign Affairs Manual is met. It may be presented to members of the foreign affairs communities.

The award consists of a gold medal set and a certificate signed by the secretary of state. The specific criteria for the issuance of the Secretary’s Award is determined by the secretary of state.

== Nominating and approval procedures ==
Nominations for the Secretary's Distinguished Service Award are normally initiated by the secretary of state. However, officials at assistant secretary or higher level who wish to recommend an individual for this award may do so by submitting a memorandum of justification, cleared by the Director General, to the Executive Secretary of the Department.

== Military use ==
Upon authorization, members of the U.S. military may wear the medal and ribbon in the appropriate order of precedence as a U.S. non-military personal decoration.

== Notable recipients ==
- Kristie Kenney, former U.S Ambassador to Thailand, the Philippines, Ecuador and former Counselor of the State Department
- Marca Bristo, disability rights activist
- Constance Berry Newman, former U.S. assistant secretary of state for African affairs, September 2005
- Daniel Bennett Smith, U.S. Ambassador to Greece
- David Petraeus, General, U.S. Army
- Raymond T. Odierno, General, U.S. Army
- Lloyd Austin, General, U.S. Army
- William M. Fraser III, General, U.S. Air Force
- Colin Powell, General, U.S. Army and former U.S. secretary of state
- John Beyrle, former U.S. Ambassador to Russia and Bulgaria
- Llewellyn Thompson, Ambassador to the Soviet Union
- Earl R. Miller, former U.S. Ambassador to Bangladesh and Botswana, issued on May 20, 2022.

== See also ==
- Awards of the United States Department of State
- Awards and decorations of the United States government
- United States Department of State
- United States Foreign Service
