= Superior Honor Award =

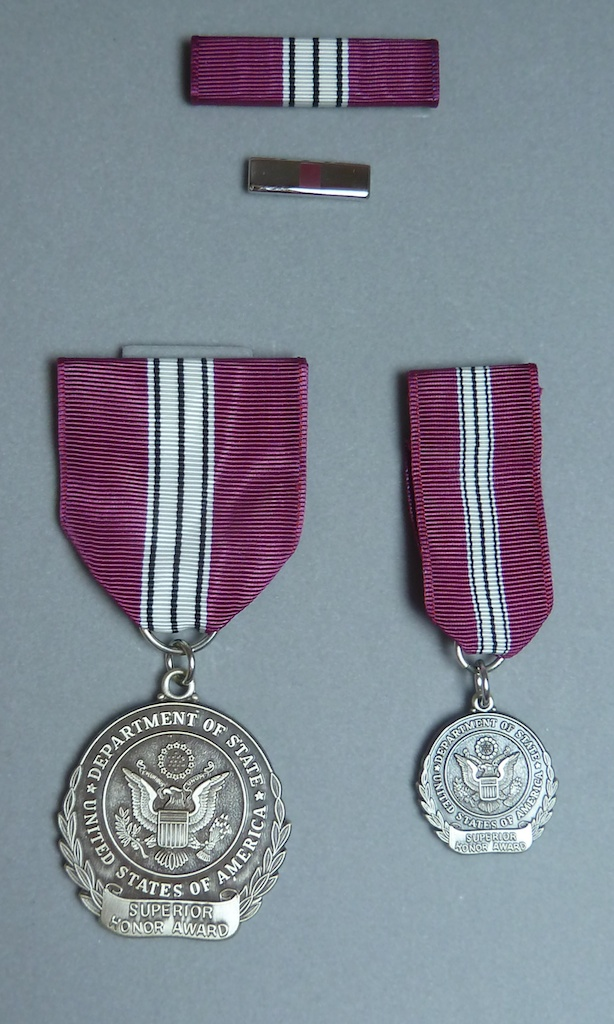
- Type: Military medal
- Awarded for: " A special act or service or sustained extraordinary performance covering a period of one year or longer"
- Presented by: United States Department of State
- Eligibility: Foreign Service, Civil Service, US Military
- Status: Currently awarded
- Ribbon

Precedence
- Next (higher): Distinguished Honor Award
- Next (lower): Meritorious Honor Award

The Superior Honor Award is an award of the United States Department of State. Similar versions of the same award exist for the former U.S. Information Agency, Arms Control and Disarmament Agency, and USAID. It is presented to groups or individuals in recognition of a special act or service or sustained extraordinary performance covering a period of one year or longer.

The award consists of a certificate signed by an assistant secretary, an official of equivalent rank or the Chief of Mission. The FAM was updated to remove the issue of the medal set.

== Criteria ==
The following criteria are applicable to granting a Superior Honor Award:

- Contributions, which had a substantial impact on the accomplishment of the agency's missions, goals, or objectives;
- Accomplishments, which substantially contributed to the advancement of U.S. Government interests;
- Exceptional performance in one or more areas of the employee's official duties as defined in the Work Requirements Statement (Foreign Service) or Performance Plan (Civil Service);
- Innovation and creativity in accomplishing long-term tasks or projects;
- Contributions that resulted in increased productivity and efficiency, and economy of operations at agency level; and/or
- Exceptional devotion to duty under adverse conditions.

== Nominating and Approval Procedures ==
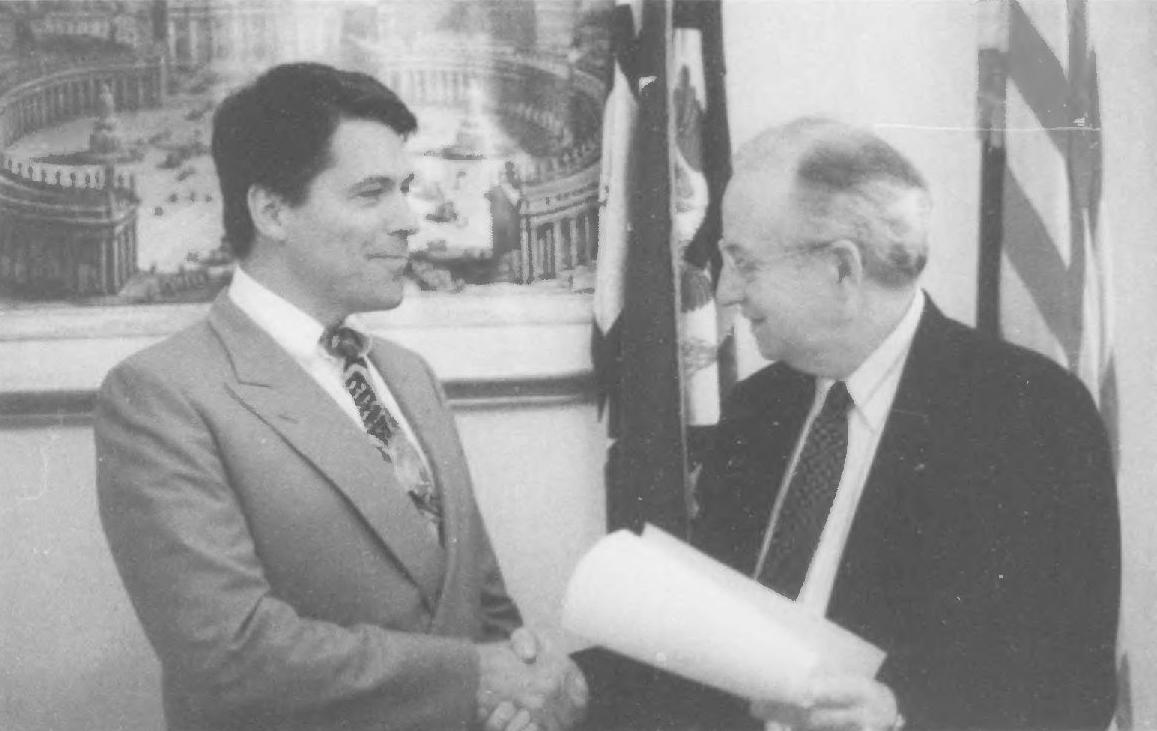
Thomas Patrick Melady (right) presenting the award to Cameron R. Hume in 1993

Nominations for State and USAID employees are submitted on Form JF-66, Nomination for Award, through supervisory channels to the Joint Country Awards Committee for review and recommendation to the Chief of Mission for final action.

Nominations initiated in Washington are submitted to the appropriate area awards committee for final action. For USAID, nominations initiated in Washington are reviewed by the USAID bureau/office with final approval by the appropriate assistant administrator or office head.

== Military Use ==
Upon authorization, members of the U.S. military may wear the medal and ribbon in the appropriate order of precedence as a U.S. non-military personal decoration.

== Notable Recipients ==
- R. Clarke Cooper, Assistant Secretary of State for Political-Military Affairs
- Javier G. Corona, Mexican diplomat and promotor of American arts.
- Philip S. Davidson, U.S. Navy Admiral
- Gary Galloway Galloway was the deputy director of the Office of Information Assurance in the U.S. State Department.
- Barry McCaffrey, principal negotiation team member for the START II Nuclear Arms Control Treaty
- Brett H. McGurk, Special Adviser to the United States Ambassador to Iraq
- J. William Middendorf, ambassador to the Netherlands and Secretary of the Navy
- David Petraeus, General, United States Army and Director of the CIA
- Bradly J. Roberson, Provincial Affairs Officer, United States Foreign Service PRT Diyala, Iraq 2007–2008
- Janet R. Larkin, General Services Officer, U.S. Department of State, Bureau of the Under Secretary for Management, 2026

== See also ==
- Awards of the United States Department of State
- Awards and decorations of the United States government
- United States Department of State
- U.S. Foreign Service
