= Foreign Affairs Manual =

Codification of U.S. State Department regulations and policies

The Foreign Affairs Manual (FAM) and associated Foreign Affairs Handbooks (FAHs) are the codified, authoritative source for the organization structures, policies, and procedures of the U.S. Department of State and U.S. Foreign Service. The FAM generally covers department policy, whereas the FAHs generally outline procedures.

The FAM is published on the department's website.

== Authority ==
Section 1 (a)(4) of the State Department Basic Authorities Act, as amended (22 U.S.C. 2651a(1)(a)(4)) authorizes the Secretary of State to “promulgate such rules and regulations as may be necessary to carry out the functions of the Secretary of State and the Department of State.”

Per 22 U.S. Code § 2658a, "the Foreign Affairs Manual and the Foreign Affairs Handbook apply with equal force and effect and without exception to all Department of State personnel, including the Secretary of State, Department employees, and political appointees, regardless of an individual’s status as a Foreign Service officer, Civil Service employee, or political appointee hired under any legal authority."

Executive Order 14211, signed by President Donald Trump on February 12, 2025, also empowers the Secretary of State to "revise or replace the Foreign Affairs Manual and direct subordinate agencies to remove, amend, or replace any handbooks, procedures, or guidance."

== List of FAM volumes ==
The FAM is divided into at least 19 volumes:

- 1 FAM Organization and Functions
- 2 FAM General
- 3 FAM Personnel
- 4 FAM Financial Management
- 5 FAM Information Management
- 6 FAM General Services
- 7 FAM Consular Affairs
- 8 FAM Passports and Consular Reports of Birth Abroad
- 9 FAM Visas
- 10 FAM Public, Educational, and Cultural Affairs
- 11 FAM Legal and Political Affairs
- 12 FAM Diplomatic Security
- 13 FAM Training and Professional Development
- 14 FAM Logistics Management
- 15 FAM Overseas Buildings Operations
- 16 FAM Medical
- 18 FAM Programs, Practices, and Planning
- 19 FAM Cybersecurity Guidance
- 20 FAM Data and Artificial Intelligence

== See also ==
- United States Secretary of State
- Code of Federal Regulations
