= Ba'ath Party (Iraqi-dominated faction) =

Iraqi-dominated faction of the Ba'ath party

Arab Socialist Ba'ath Party Arabic: حزب البعث العربي الاشتراكي
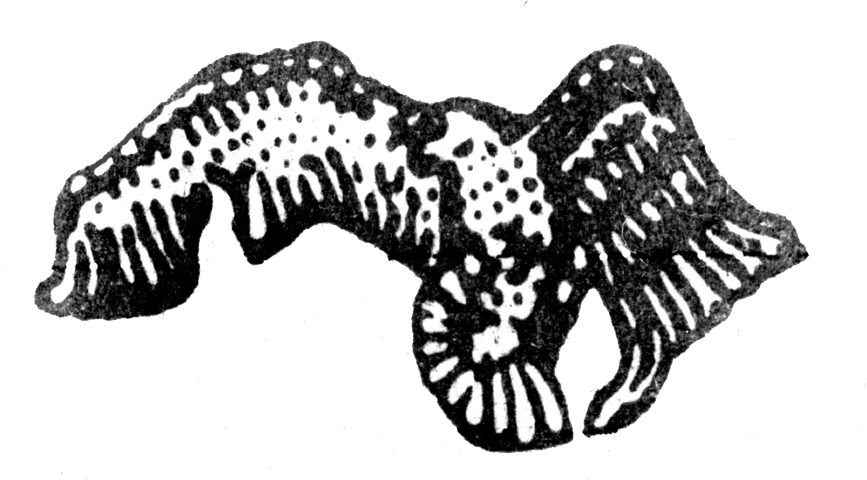
- General Secretary: Salah Al-Mukhtar
- Founded: 25 February 1966
- Banned: In Iraq: 16 May 2003 (still active in other states)
- Split from: Ba'ath Party (unitary)
- Headquarters: Baghdad, Iraq (1966–2003)
- Armed wing: Army of the Men of the Naqshbandi Order (2006–present)
- Ideology: Ba'athism; Saddamism (from 1979); Arab–Islamic nationalism (from 1993)
- Political position: Left-wing (Note: The Iraqi Ba'ath represents the "right-wing" of the Ba'ath movement.)
- Colors: Black, red, white and green (Pan-Arab colors)

Party flag

The Arab Socialist Ba'ath Party (spelled "Ba'th" or "Baath", "resurrection" or "renaissance"; Arabic: حزب البعث العربي الاشتراكي Ḥizb al-Ba‘th al-‘Arabī al-Ishtirākī), also referred to as the pro-Iraqi Ba'ath movement, is a Ba'athist political party which was headquartered in Baghdad, Iraq, until 2003. It is one of two parties (with identical names) which emerged from the 1966 split of the original Ba'ath Party.

In 1966, the original Ba'ath Party was split in half; one half was led by the Damascus leadership of the Ba'ath Party which established a party in Syria and the other half with its leadership in Baghdad. The two Ba'ath parties retained the same name and maintained parallel structures in the Arab world, but relations became so antagonistic that Syria supported Iran against Iraq during the bloody Iran–Iraq War; it also joined the U.S.-led coalition against Iraq in the Gulf War. The Ba'athists seized power in Iraq for the first time in 1963, but were deposed several months later. The party's regional organisation governed Iraq between 1968 and 2003, for many years under the leadership of Saddam Hussein. The Arab Socialist Ba'ath Party – Iraq Region was banned in 2003 by the Coalition Provisional Authority following the invasion of Iraq by the US and its allies. Other branches of the party have continued to operate.

== Structure ==
=== Secretaries General ===
No.	Portrait	Name (Lifespan)	Tenure		
No.	Portrait	Name (Lifespan)	Took office	Left office	Duration
1		Michel Aflaq ميشيل عفلق (1910–1989)	8 February 1968	23 June 1989 #	21 years, 135 days
Vacant (23 June 1989 – January 1992)
2		Saddam Hussein صدام حسين (1937–2006)	January 1992	30 December 2006 (executed)	14 years, 11 months
3		Izzat Ibrahim al-Douri عزت إبراهيم الدوري (1942–2020)	30 December 2006	26 October 2020 #	13 years, 301 days
4		Salah Al-Mukhtar صلاح المختار (born 1944)	3 November 2020	Incumbent	6 years, 8 days

=== National Congress ===
Note: for the 1st–8th National Congresses, see the national congresses held by the unified, pre-February 1966 Ba'ath Party.

- 9th National Congress (February 1968)
- 10th National Congress (March 1970)
- 11th National Congress (1977)
- 12th National Congress (1992)

=== Organization ===
Following the 1966 Syrian coup d'état, which overthrew the Aflaqite faction led by Michel Aflaq, Salah al-Din al-Bitar, Munif Razzaz and others, the original Ba'ath Party split into Iraqi-dominated and a Syrian-dominated ba'ath movements. The two movements established separate National Commands; the National Command was in theory the highest party body in both movements and controlled their respective ba'athist movements. However, in both countries the National Command was under the control of its respective Regional Command. In the Iraqi-dominated Ba'ath movement, all National Command members came from their regional branch – for instance, there was always a member representing the Ba'ath Party branch in Jordan. In theory, the National Command was the highest party organ between national congresses, with the power to control the affairs of Regional Commands in other regions (countries).

Delegates to a National Congress elected the members of the National Command, who were eligible for reelection. While the National Command had few de facto powers, many of its leading members also held seats in the Iraqi Regional Command and the Revolutionary Command Council. Aflaq was elected Secretary-General of the National Command at the Ninth National Congress, held in February 1968 in Beirut, Lebanon, by the Iraqi-dominated Ba'ath Party. He retained his post until his death in 1989, when he was succeeded by Saddam Hussein. After Saddam was executed on 30 December 2006, Izzat Ibrahim al-Douri became de facto leader of the Ba'ath Party on 3 January 2007. As Secretary of the Iraqi Regional Command of the Arab Socialist Ba'ath Party, he was the highest-ranked surviving member of the former Ba'ath party. Since 3 November 2020, the party is headed by Salah Al-Mukhtar.

== Branches by region ==
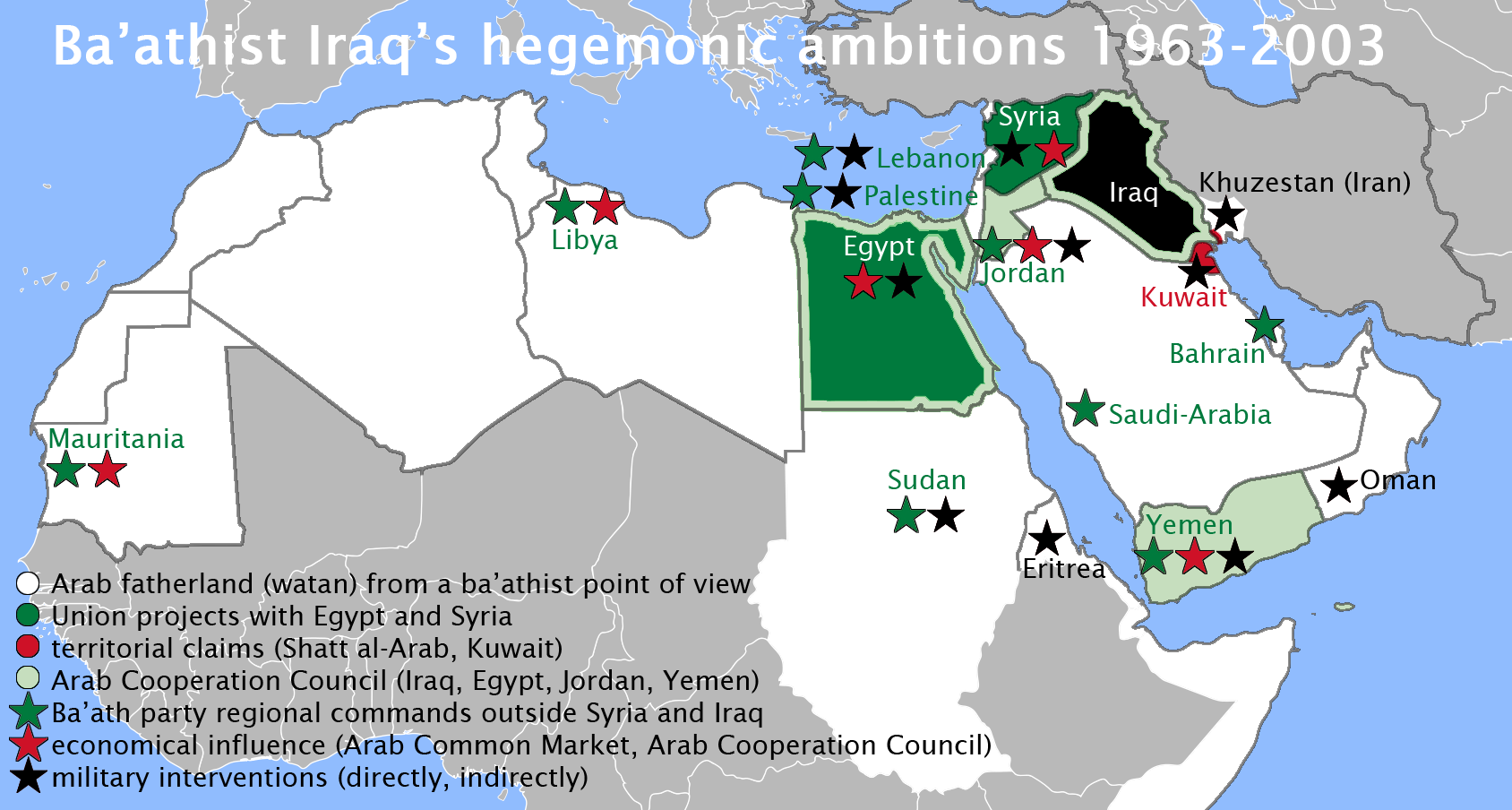
Ba'athist Iraq's hegemonic ambitions between 1963 and 2003

=== Algeria ===
The party branch in Algeria, the Arab Socialist Ba'ath Party of Algeria (Arabic: حزب البعث العربي الاشتراكي في الجزائر Hizb Al-Ba'ath Al-'Arabi Al-Ishtiraki fi Al-Jaza'ir; French: Parti Baath arabe socialiste d'Algérie), is led by Ahmed Choutri (secretary of the Regional Command). The party is banned and Choutri was forced to flee to Iraq during the 1990s because of governmental repression against the Algerian Ba'ath movement. The party sympathises with the Iraqi Ba'athist insurgency and supports Izzat Ibrahim al-Douri, leader of the Iraqi branch. Following his return to Algeria in 2003, Choutri wrote The Baathist Faith of President Saddam.

=== Bahrain ===
The Nationalist Democratic Assembly (Arabic: التجمع القومي الديمقراطي, Al-Tajamu'u Al-Qawmi Al-Dimuqratiyah) represents the Iraqi-dominated Ba'ath Party in Bahrain. The group is led by Hassan Ali as Secretary General and Mahmoud Kassab as Deputy Secretary General. It was established by Bahrainis who had studied in Ba'athist Iraq during the 1960s and 1970s. The party boycotted the 2002 parliamentary election, but not the 2006 election. The 2011 parliamentary by-election was boycotted by the party in solidarity with the Bahraini uprising. It is headquartered in Zinj.

The party opposes the government's naturalisation policies and contends that it is unfair for ethnic Bahrainis to compete equally with foreign workers for jobs. The Nationalist Democratic Assembly remains pro-Saddam Hussein and according to its webpage supports the Arab Spring. It opposed the 2003 invasion of Iraq, considering it an act of brutality against the Iraqi people. The party actively supports the overthrow of the existing monarchy, with a peaceful transition to democracy.

=== Egypt ===
The Arab Socialist Ba'ath Party – Egypt Region (Arabic: حزب البعث العربي الاشتراكي- مصر Hizb Al-Ba'ath Al-Arabi Al-Ishtiraki – Misr) is an active branch in Egypt.

The party supported the removing of Bashar al-Assad of Syria, although calls for no foreign intervention in the conflict, whether by Israel, Turkey or Iran, as the party believes all such countries have ulterior motives and seek to undermine Syria.

The party was outlawed in the early 1990s and two Iraqi Intelligence Officials were detained on 14 April 1991 with $38,000 in their possession, money which the Egyptian authorities claimed was to be used to fund sabotage operations in Egypt. Several other Egyptian Ba'athists, including the poet Muhammad Afifi Matar, were also detained in April 1991 on suspicion of involvement in an Iraqi terrorist plot.

=== Eritrea ===
Ba'athist organizations emerged in the leadership of the Eritrean Liberation Front in the 1970s, with pro-Baghdad and pro-Damascus groups competing for political dominance over the front. This split contributed to the downfall of the ELF and the emergence of the Eritrean People's Liberation Front as the dominant liberation movement. A key pro-Iraqi Ba'athist was Abdel Gadir Jeilani, who became the leader of the ELF-PLF-Revolutionary Council in the 1980s.

=== Iraq ===
In Iraq, the Ba'ath party remained a civilian group and lacked strong support from the military. The party had little impact and the movement split into several factions after 1958 and again in 1966. The movement was reported to have lacked strong popular support, but through the construction of a strong party apparatus the party succeeded in gaining power. The Iraqi-based party was originally committed to pan-Arabism (like its Syrian counterpart). After taking power in 1968, the party adopted Iraqi nationalism and encouraged Iraqis to identify themselves as cultural heirs of Mesopotamia with an Islamic identity. Saddam Hussein sought to be seen as leader of a great neo-Mesopotamian Iraqi nation by having himself compared to Nebuchadnezzar II and Hammurabi.

In June 2003, the Coalition Provisional Authority (CPA) banned the Ba'ath party. The additional step the CPA took – banning all members of the top four tiers of the Ba'ath Party from the new government, public schools and colleges – was criticized for blocking too many experienced people from participation in the new government. Thousands were removed from their positions, including doctors, professors, schoolteachers and bureaucrats. Many teachers lost their jobs, sparking protests at schools and universities. Under previous Ba'ath-party rule, one could not reach a high position in the government or a school without becoming a party member and party membership was a prerequisite for university admission. While many Ba'athists joined for ideological reasons, many more were members because it was a way to better their options. Following pressure by the United States, the policy of de-Ba'athification was addressed by the Iraqi government in January 2008 with its controversial Accountability and Justice Act. This purported to ease the policy, but many feared it would lead to further dismissals. The Ba'ath Party was led by Saddam's former deputy Izzat Ibrahim al-Douri until his death in 2020.

=== Jordan ===
At the time of the 1966 split, the Jordanian branch had an estimated 1,000 members. It was active in the Arab Liberation Front (ALF) and the ALF's first leader was the Jordanian, Zaid Haydar. Munif al-Razzaz, who joined the pro-Iraqi Ba'ath resistance in 1966, eventually became an ALF leader. From there, he climbed the party ladder and became a member of the National Command before he was placed under house arrest by Iraqi authorities. Shahir Abu Shahut became the first leader of the party branch in Jordan after the 1966 split.

Since the establishment of the authoritarian political systems in Iraq and Syria, the popularity of the Ba'ath Party has largely diminished, as the two Ba'ath parties have replaced ideology with blind allegiance to Saddamist discourse or the al-Assad rule, respectively. However, Ba'athist ideology remains popular; a Jordanian academic, talking to the American embassy in Amman, Jordan, said that "there are far more real Ba'athists outside the party than inside", noting that the present party is downplaying (and even replacing) ideological components to get more followers.

The party was able to gain some support in the 1990s because of its status as a Ba'ath Party branch and it was able to help finance thousands of scholarships to Iraqi universities. However, with the 2003 invasion of Iraq the party was nearly forced into bankruptcy and lost most of its followers when it failed to finance the return of students from Iraq.

The Ba'ath branch was denied legal registration in 1992. The party was legally registered in 1993, but forced to change its name from the Arab Socialist Ba'ath Party to the Jordanian Arab Socialist Ba'ath Party (Arabic: حزب البعث العربي الاشتراكي الاردني Hizb Al-Ba'ath Al-'Arabi Al-Ishtiraki Al-Urduniy). Khalil Haddadeen, Jordan's former minister of information, was elected to Parliament during the 1993 and 1997 elections on a pro-Iraqi, Saddamist platform. Currently, the Ba'ath branch has no members of parliament.

In its first regional congress since the 2003 invasion of Iraq, the Regional Command alleged it would publicize an alleged letter from Saddam Hussein. However, the Jordanian press largely ignored the event. Today, in contrast to Ba'athist ideology both the pro-Iraq and pro-Syrian Ba'ath branches are considered largely irrelevant in the Jordanian political scene. It is suffering from financial problems and it is criticized by religious Jordanians for its secularism, while others are weary of its Arab nationalist ideology.

In a 1995 poll, 16.8 percent of Jordanians said they were aware that the Iraqi Ba'ath branch existed, making the Ba'ath branch the third-best-known political party in Jordan (surpassing the Ba'ath Arab Progressive Party, the Syrian Ba'athist branch, by over 10 percent in the poll). In 2003 it was estimated that the party had fewer than 200 members. According to a Cablegate document dating back to 2007, the Arab Socialist Ba'ath Party figure Ahmed Al Dmour was considered one of the biggest threats to Islamic Action Front dominance on the political scene. In 2023, the Jordanian Ba'ath Party's licence to participate in the local elections was renewed, causing criticism from Iraqi figures.

=== Kuwait ===
As of 1983 the branch was led by Faisal al-Sani. The Kuwaiti Ba'ath Party branch collapsed during Gulf War because of the Iraqi invasion of Kuwait. Saleh al-Mutlaq, the leader of the Iraqi National Dialogue Front, has been accused of trying to rebuild the party.

=== Lebanon ===
It is presently known as the Socialist Arab Lebanon Vanguard Party (Arabic: حزب طليعة لبنان العربي الاشتراكي, Hizb Al-Taliyeh Lubnan Al-'Arabi Al-Ishtiraki). It is the party branch in Lebanon. The branch held its second congress in October 2011.

However, the existence of the pro-Iraqi Lebanese branch of the Ba'ath party has much longer roots. Following the 1966 split in the Ba'ath movement with party members split between Syrian and Iraqi allegiances, the Iraqi wing was led by Abd al-Majid Rafei. Other prominent members at the time of the split were Jihad George Karam, Rafiq Nasib Alfaqiya, Karam Mohamed Assahli, Hani Mohamed Shoiab, Ammar Mohamed Shabli, Hassan Khalil Gharib and Asaf Habin Alharakat.

At first, the pro-Iraqi Ba'ath branch and the pro-Syrian Ba'ath branch worked side by side in the National Front, but with tension increasing between the Syrian and Iraqi Ba'athist factions the two parties were on a war footing. The party was active in 1960s demonstrations and al-Rafei was detained by Lebanese authorities for his political activities, but he was a candidate from Tripoli in the 1968 general election. The party expanded during the first half of the 1970s and in the 1972 general election al-Rafi was elected to parliament from Tripoli. Ali al-Khalil, a former member, was elected from Tyre. The party was active in Southern Lebanon and was built with generous aid from Iraq. During the Lebanese Civil War, the Lebanese parliament formed the National Dialogue Committee in 1975. Assem Qanso of the pro-Syrian Ba'ath Party became a member, but no figures from the pro-Iraqi Ba'ath Party were given a seat on the committee. Tahsein al-Atrash, leader of the Ba'ath branch at the time, was shot dead in November 1981. The party was a member of the Lebanese National Movement, a political organisation led by Walid Jumblatt of the Progressive Socialist Party. Throughout its existence, it has controlled the Palestinian Arab Liberation Front.

=== Libya ===
Following the coup d'état of 1969 against King Idris, a new revolutionary government was established, led by Muammar Gaddafi. The government was recognised as Nasserist because the new administration proclaimed its goal as "liberty, socialism and unity", rather than "unity, liberty, socialism" (the Ba'ath Party's slogan). This change in order was important because of the ideological split between the Ba'athists and the Nasserists. Following Gaddafi's revolution, several People's Committees were established. These committees (which at the beginning were led by the people) arrested several ba'athists.

Amr Taher Deghayes, founder of the Libyan Ba'ath branch, was later arrested by Gaddafi's security forces and died after three days in jail. Deghayes' death allegedly sparked a large anti-government demonstration (which was crushed), followed by the imprisonment of several leading Ba'athists. In 1982, a trial began in which 25 Libyan Ba'athists were charged with membership in an illegal organisation and they were freed after torture. The following year, they were re-tried on the same charge: three were sentenced to death and others to life in prison. The arrests and trials of the 1980s led to the dissolution of the Libyan regional Ba'athist organisation.

The Libyan National Movement (LNM), an Arab-nationalist organisation, was founded by Ba'athist lawyer 'Umran Burweiss. The LNM (still in existence) was originally financed by Iraqi Ba'athists and produced relatively high-quality propaganda materials. For example, it issued audio cassettes which were smuggled into Libya with Sawt at-Talia during the 1980s. The organisation also produced broadcasts for Radio Baghdad.

=== Mauritania ===
The first pro-Iraqi activities was in 1968, but it was organizationally established in 1972. The Mauritanian Ba'athist divide their history into two phases: founding (1976–1982) and deployment (1982–1990). There is little available information on the 1968–1970 period and Ba'athist activity started in earnest in the early 1970s. The party's first clandestine congress was held in 1976. They opposed the rule of President Moktar Ould Daddah and used most of their early years in trying to infiltrate the ruling Mauritanian People's Party and state institutions. In the aftermath of the July 1978 coup, the Ba'ath branch took the conscious decision of trying to recruit Haratin people. They started publishing The Baaʿth and the Haratine in Mauritania to help them in their quest. In the period 1978–1984, the party intensified its effort of recruiting members within the military establishment. The Ba'ath party was one of the most fervent supporters of the Arabization policies in Mauritania. Because of their efforts, Mohammed Yehdih Ould Breideleil, the Ba'ath leader, was appointed Minister of Information for a short period in 1984. Under the rule of Mohamed Khouna Ould Haidalla, the Ba'ath were harassed and in between 1982 and 1983 55 Ba'athists were arrested by the government. However, by 1986–1987 the Ba'ath had managed to infiltrate the officer corps and the enlisted ranks, making them a threat to Maaouya Ould Sid'Ahmed Taya and his rule. Maaouya Ould Sid'Ahmed Taya, with Saddam Hussein's approval, expelled and banned Ba'athist personnel in the military in 1988. Mauritania strongly supported Saddam Hussein's Iraq during the Iran-Iraq War.

With Iraq's invasion of Kuwait, the Ba'ath party lost its popular appeal and the financial aid from the Iraqi embassy dried up. By 1990, there was not much left of the original Ba'ath movement.

Another party, the National Vanguard Party (Arabic: حزب الطليعة الوطني, romanized: Hizb Al-Taliyeh Al-Watani, French: Parti Avant-Garde nationale or PAGN), was founded in 1991 and it replaced the old Ba'ath movement which had disintegrated in 1990. The Mauritanian Ba'ath Party remains the largest Arab nationalist political force in the country. The branch has maintained good relations with the Baghdad-based Ba'ath Party, even after Saddam Hussein's downfall following the 2003 invasion of Iraq. The party was able to field candidates for parliamentary seats during the 1992 parliamentary elections and was the only party (with the exception of the Republican Party for Democracy and Renewal) to field candidates for senate elections. However, the party secured only one percent of the vote nationwide and did not secure a seat in either Parliament or the Senate. Kabry Ould Taleb Jiddou, the party's leader, was awarded the office of Secretary of State by the newly elected Government because of his electoral campaign.

The branch supports full Arabization of the country, a view considered racist by critics. Ould Haidalla introduced an anti-ba'athist policy which continued under his successor, President Maaouya Ould Sid'Ahmed Taya. However, the Mauritanian Government supported Iraq during the Gulf War, and Iraq–Mauritania relations became so close that (inaccurate) rumors circulated internationally that Saddam's family had taken refuge in the country following the American invasion. Repression against the ba'athists has not been reduced. In 2003, several ba'athists were jailed on suspicion of trying to overthrow the government. A reason for the close relationship between Iraq and Mauritania was the strength of the Mauritanian ba'athist party. The party was banned in 1999 following the official instauration of bilateral relations with Israel. The National Vanguard Party was accused of developing plans in collaboration with the Iraqi government to foment unrest in the country.

Mohamed Ould Abdellahi Ould Eyye, the party's leader, was arrested in 2003 after a large anti-government protest demanding that the government break off relations with Israel and the United States and help Saddam Hussein. He and 13 other ba'athists were arrested by government forces and the party's headquarters were raided in May. Another pro-Iraqi Ba'ath party did take its place, the Party for Work and National Unity (French: Parti pour le Travail et l'Unité Nationale, abbreviated PTUN). However, while PTUN is close to the Iraqi Ba'ath party branch, the group is small and largely inactive.

=== Palestine ===
Palestinian branch
- Founded: 1969
- Secretary-General: Rakad Salem
- Newspaper: Sawt al-Jamahir
- Homepage: alfpalestine.org

A disorganised pro-Iraqi Ba'ath guerilla movement existed before the establishment of the Arab Liberation Front (ALF). The ALF was established in 1969 at a National Congress of the Iraqi-dominated Ba'ath Party to weaken the hold al-Sa'iqa, the pro-Syrian Ba'ath organisation in Palestine had over the ba'athist movement. In contrast to al-Sa'iqa, the ALF never had access to a large recruitment pool. There were few Palestinians in Iraq, and the Palestinians living in Iraq were generally well-educated. Because of this, ALF could not and would never have the same degree of influence over the Palestinian movement as al-Sa'iqa did. This caused the ALF to be controlled by the pro-Iraq Ba'ath movement, thus weakening its effectiveness and influence, but saving it from infighting between Palestinianists and Ba'athists (a problem in al-Sa'iqa). However, the ALF's influence weakened periodically during its history due to infighting in the pro-Iraq Ba'ath movement. Because of the control the pro-Iraq Ba'ath movement had over the ALF, the ALF always held a pro-Iraqi position in the Palestine Liberation Organization (PLO). The ALF was a founding member of the Rejectionist Front in 1974, rejecting the PLO's Ten Point Program. Abdel-Wahhab Kayyali (a member of the PLO Executive Committee) froze his seat on the committee in protest, instead of following the example (resignation) of the Rejectionist Front.

The invasion of Iraq toppled the Iraqi-dominated Ba'ath Party, headquartered in Baghdad. This weakened the movement and since the Iraqi military coordinated much of the ALF's activities the ALF has also been considerably weakened.

The ALF's first leader was Zaid Haydar from the Jordanian Ba'ath branch. Other leaders include Munif al-Razzaz, Abd al-Rahim Ahmad and Mahmud Isma'il. Most recently, it was led by Rakad Salem and headquartered in Ramallah, West Bank. Israeli Defence Forces arrested Salem in October 2002. Shahir Abu Shahut, former leader of the Jordanian Ba'ath branch, led the Ba'ath branch in Palestine from 1970 to 1975 from Baghdad.

=== Sudan ===
The Arab Socialist Ba'ath Party – Country of Sudan is the regional branch of the Ba'ath Party in Sudan. Kamal Bolad was the Regional Secretary in 1989 and Taiseer Mutassir was the Regional Secretary in 1990. While the branch has always been small, accounting for an estimated 1,000 members in 2003, it has been able to have a bigger impact than what its meager membership numbers would suggest, mostly due to Iraqi financing of the branch.

After collaborating with the Arab nationalist Sudanese government for years, the Ba'ath Party broke off relations and became an opposition party in 1990 – this would have disturbed Iraq if Sudan had not supported it during the 1991 Gulf crisis. In 1990, the party was composed largely of students who had studied in Ba'athist Iraq. The party, which was small in 1990, was influential in certain sectors, was opposed to the National Islamic Front and was staunchly secularist. Members have historically been torn between the Ba'ath and other secular party movements, such as the Sudanese communists. Because of Saddam Hussein's amicable relationship with the Revolutionary Command Council for National Salvation, the body ruling Sudan, the Ba'ath branched was oppressed by the authorities. Later in 1990, 26 Ba'athi military officers were executed in Khartoum after a failed military coup. In 2002, a group led by Mohamad Ali Jadein broke away from the branch and established the independent Sudanese Ba'ath Party, which has no affiliation with neither the pro-Iraq Ba'ath movement nor the pro-Syrian Ba'ath movement. The following year, after the invasion of Iraq 80 Sudanese Ba'athists return to Sudan under the condition that they would stay out of politics.

=== Syria ===
The Syrian branch of the Iraqi-led party supported the Muslim Brotherhood during the Islamist uprising against the Syrian Ba'ath government.

=== Tunisia ===
The first Ba'athist branch in Tunisia, then under the unified Ba'ath Party, was established in 1955, but the Ba'ath Party was outlawed under Zine El Abidine Ben Ali. Following the Tunisian Revolution, the Tunisian Ba'ath Movement (Arabic: حركة البعث التونسي Haraket Al-Ba'ath Al-Tounisi; French: Mouvement Baath tunisien) was established at its First Congress on 3–5 June 2011 and legally registered on 22 January 2011. However, ba'athists have been active in underground politics since the 1950s. The Ba'ath Movement celebrated the fifth anniversary of the death of Saddam Hussein. Omar Othman Belhadj, Secretary-General of the executive committee of the Ba'ath Movement, said that "Hussein's execution was symbolic, they did not kill a person but rather the ideas he represented and fought for. Hussein was killed for being against colonization and for being a defender of Arab unity and independence of Arab countries". He further noted that he did not support killing Muammar Gaddafi, saying that Gaddafi had a right to a fair trial like anyone else.

Omar once told a journalist, "the Syrian regime has turned against the Ba'ath and is no longer Ba'athist one". The party does not support Syria's expulsion from the Arab League and asserts that foreign nations should play a neutral role in the Syrian Civil War. On 4 February 2012, the executive committee of the Ba'ath Movement released a communiqué condemning the provisional Tunisian government's expulsion of the Syrian ambassador. The Ba'ath Movement expressed solidarity with the Syrian protesters and condemned the shooting of unarmed demonstrators. The committee predicted that the Syrian ambassador's expulsion would militarise the conflict, mobilising Arab opinion against the government and leading to military intervention. After the revolution, the Arab Democratic Vanguard Party emerged as second "Iraqi" Baathist Party in Tunisia. Its membership is younger and its political position more at the left of the historically Baath Movement and is headed by Kheireddine Souabni and Ahmed Seddik. The Ba'ath Movement is a member of the Popular Front, a communist-dominated front with strong popular backing.

=== Yemen ===
The National Arab Socialist Ba'ath Party – Yemen Region (Arabic: حزب البعث العربي الاشتراكي القومي – قطر اليمن Hizb Al-Ba'ath Al-Arabi Al-Ishtiraki Al-Qawmi – Qutr Al-Yaman) is led by Qassem Salam Said as Secretary of the Regional Command while Abdulwahid Hawash serves as Deputy Secretary. It publishes the newspaper Al-Ehyaa Al-'Arabi (Arabic: الإحياء العربي, English: Arabic Renaissance).

The party carried out clandestine political activity until 1990 and was registered as the National Arab Socialist Ba'ath Party on 10 February 1997. It had initially sought to register as the Arab Socialist Ba'ath Party in 1995, but that name was given by the authorities to the pro-Syria Ba'athist party. Politically, the party is allied with the ruling General People's Congress and during the 2011 Arab Spring this position caused an internal split. In March 2011, it was reported that the Hodeidah branch of the party had sided with the uprising after violent attacks on protesters in the city.

The party contested the 1993 parliamentary election in alliance with the pro-Syrian Arab Socialist Ba'ath Party, winning seven seats. After the election, relations between the two Ba'athist groups soured and they contested further elections separately. The party contested the 1997 parliamentary election (failing to win any seats) and called for a boycott of the 1999 presidential election. Said, the branch leader, was sued by the Ministry of Information in February 2000 over an article criticising Saudi Arabia. In the 2003 parliamentary elections, the party obtained 23,745 votes (0.4 percent of the national vote) and again failed to re-enter parliament. However, it won two district-council seats in the 2006 local council elections.
