= De-Ba'athification =

Policy undertaken in Iraq by the Coalition Provisional Authority (CPA)

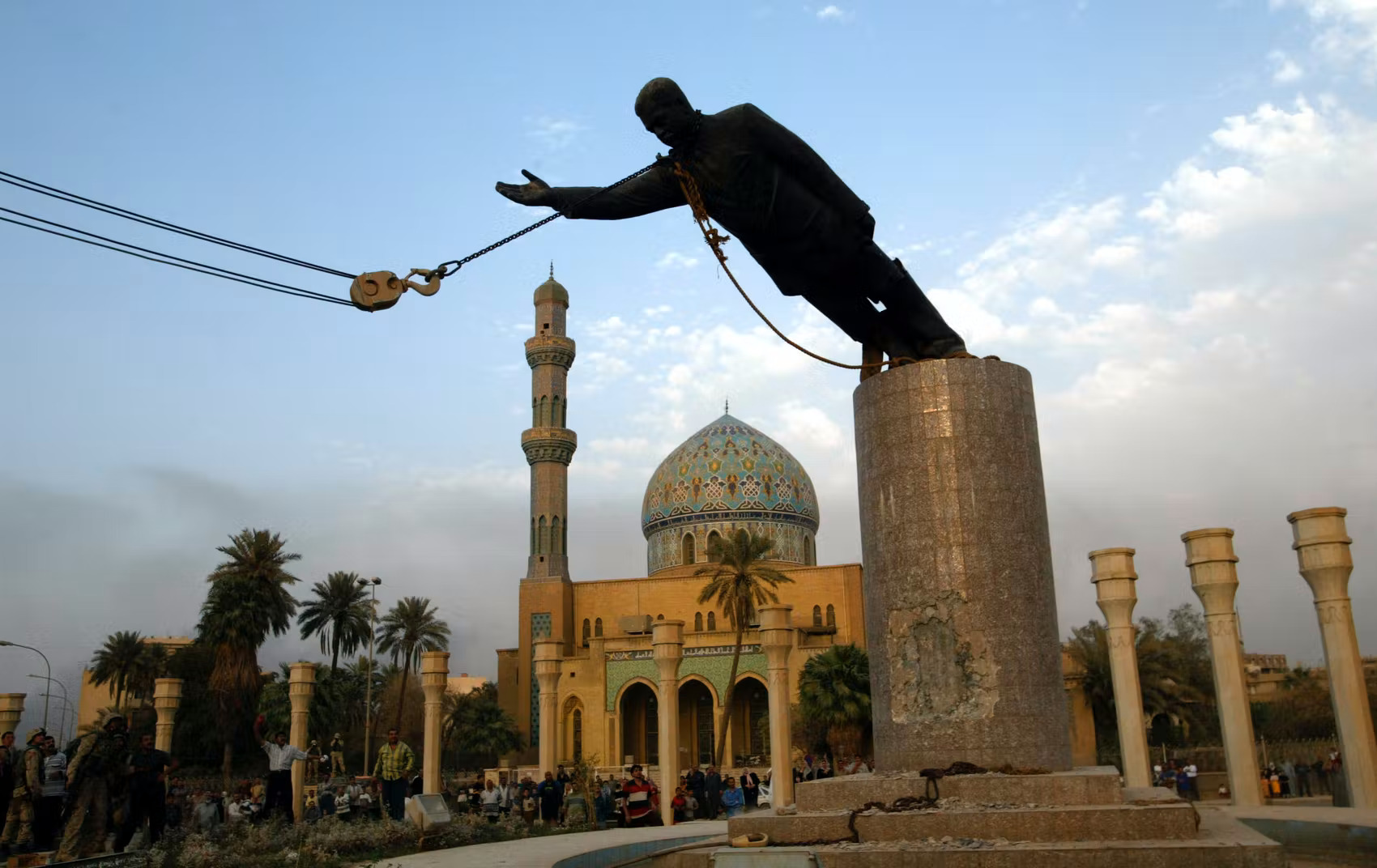
One of the earliest manifestations of de-Ba'athification in Iraq was the destruction of imagery associated with Saddam Hussein

De-Ba'athification (Arabic: اجتثاث حزب البعث; sometimes called de-Saddamization) refers to a policy undertaken in Iraq by the Coalition Provisional Authority (CPA) and subsequent Iraqi governments to remove the Iraqi Ba'ath Party's influence in the new Iraqi political system after the U.S.-led invasion in 2003. It was considered by the CPA to be Ba'athist Iraq's equivalent to Nazi Germany's denazification after World War II, Nikita Khrushchev's de-Stalinization after 1956 and de-Ottomanization in the Ottoman Empire. It was first outlined in CPA Order 1 which entered into force on 16 May 2003. The order declared that all public sector employees affiliated with the Ba'ath Party were to be removed from their positions and to be banned from any future employment in the public sector.

The policy was highly controversial among many American academics, institutions, government, military, and international media and debate outlets. The policy under the CPA was officially rescinded on 28 June 2004 as part of the transfer of sovereignty to the Iraqi Interim Government two days later. However, elements of the policy continued under the Iraqi Governing Council and later under the elected Iraqi Parliament.

The de-Baathification order was drafted by relatively unknown mid-level Pentagon officials and emerged from Secretary of Defense Donald Rumsfeld’s office.

Proponents of the policy contend that the policy effectively cleansed Iraqi society of Ba'athist influence, facilitating the creation of a democratic Iraqi government. Critics argue that the policy was not only undemocratic, but also a significant factor in the deteriorating security situation throughout Iraq. The policy became associated with anti-Sunni sectarianism due to it disproportionately affecting Sunni Muslims.

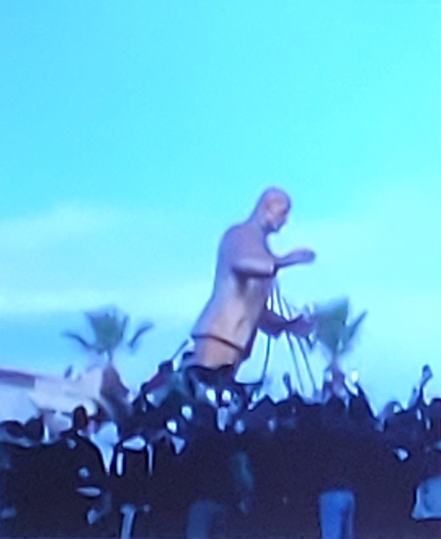
De-Ba'athification also occurred in Syria after the fall of the Assad regime in December 2024

A similar de-Ba'athification also occurred in Syria from December 2024 following the fall of Ba'athist Syria which also removed the influence of the Syrian Ba'ath Party in the new Syrian political system led by the new Syrian caretaker government.

== Goal of policy ==
The goal of the policy is contained in the language of the preamble of Order No. 1:

Recognizing that the Iraqi people have suffered large scale human rights abuses and depravations [sic] over many years at the hands of the Ba'ath Party,
Noting the grave concern of Iraqi society regarding the threat posed by the continuation of Ba'ath Party networks and personnel in the administration of Iraq, and the intimidation of the people of Iraq by Ba'ath Party officials,
Concerned by the continuing threat to the security of the Coalition Forces posed by the Iraqi Ba'ath Party,

Additionally within the first section of Order No. 1:

This order implements the declaration by eliminating the party's structures and removing its leadership from positions of authority and responsibility in Iraqi society. By this means, the Coalition Provisional Authority will ensure that representative government in Iraq is not threatened by Ba'athist elements returning to power and that those in positions of authority in the future are acceptable to the people of Iraq.

Pursuant to the goals of acting on behalf of Iraqi society and attempting to create "secure, stable environment that will sustain freedom and democracy for the Iraqi people," the goal of the policy was to further the establishment of a democratic political system in Iraq. The overarching goal of the invasion was the seizure and removal of weapons of mass destruction (WMDs) and the creation of a democratic government in the Middle East to help fight the Global War on Terror (GWOT). Pursuant to these overarching goals, de-Ba'athification was seen as the logical way to ensure that a previously entrenched, undemocratic, and by all accounts unpopular regime and its influences on political culture were removed.

== Formation ==
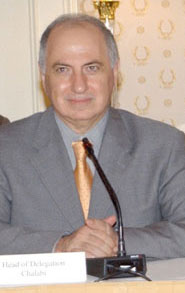
Ahmad Chalabi acted as key figure on the 2003–2004 Supreme National De-Baathification Commission created by Paul Bremer.

De-Ba'athification, as a part of the overall occupation strategy, was delegated to the United States Department of Defense per National Security Presidential Directive 24 issued on 20 January 2003, only 60 days prior to the 20 March 2003 invasion. Compared to the nearly five years the Allied Powers spent in World War II planning the post-war occupation of Germany and Japan, this was a short amount of time to plan occupation strategy and operations. Although the idea of a de-Ba'athification policy was articulated by Ahmad Chalabi and Iraqi National Congress, their comparisons to de-Nazification caught the attention of Douglas Feith, the head of the Office of Special Plans. The actual time-frame for the development of the policy was a matter of weeks. On 10 March 2003, a National Security Council meeting was held to determine the extent of de-Ba'athification because of disagreements between the Department of Defense, the United States Department of State, and the CIA. The Department of Defense argued for an expansive policy targeting any and all members of the Ba'ath Party. This was in contrast to the State Department and CIA, who advocated a less comprehensive "de-Saddamification" policy which would only target those accused of crimes and upper echelon leadership. A compromise was reached: the top leadership in the Ba'ath Party would be removed and a South African style "Truth and Reconciliation" council would be established to assess the culpability of lower level party members. According to Charles Ferguson's interviews, the next time the policy was discussed outside of the National Security Council or the Department of Defense's Office of Special Plans was on 15 May 2003. On that day, the recently appointed head of the Coalition Provisional Authority, Paul Bremer sent Gen. Jay Garner, administrator of the Office of Reconstruction and Humanitarian Assistance (ORHA), a draft copy of the order that was to be issued the following day.

== Drafting and planning phase ==
The drafting and planning of the policy began with a paper, which was issued by Ahmad Chalabi and the Iraqi National Council, describing the possibility of removing Ba'ath Party influence from the Iraqi political sphere and comparing such a possibility to the Allied policy of De-Nazification articulated in the Potsdam Agreement of 1945. During the 60 days allotted for post-war occupation, the more stringent Department of Defense version was drafted by the Office of Special Plans in spite of the 10 March National Security Council compromise. Prior to Paul Bremer's arrival in Iraq on 12 May 2003, he met with Douglas Feith and the Office of Special Plans, where he received his first briefing regarding de-Ba'athification. Following the meeting, the final draft was written, and was sent via courier to Iraq after Bremer's arrival.

=== Architects of the policy ===
Per National Security Presidential Directive 24, the U.S. Department of Defense was the principal organization in charge of the occupation. To this end, Paul Wolfowitz and Douglas Feith created the Office of Special Plans in order to devise Department of Defense strategy for occupying Iraq. In addition to Wolfowitz and Feith, Walter Slocombe accepted the position of overseeing the implementation of the Department of Defense's occupation strategy. All of this occurred under the purview of the then Secretary of Defense Donald Rumsfeld. According to Charles Ferguson's film interview with Gen. Jay Garner, Paul Bremer told Garner that "I was given my orders." This led Garner to believe that Bremer was not responsible for the content of the policy, but was executing Department of Defense policy.

In a 2016 interview with PBS, Colin Powell described his surprise over the authorization to issue CPA 1 and 2 orders saying "Some have said in their memoirs, well, the NSC was told about it. But I can tell you, I wasn't told about it. Condi wasn't told about it. The president wasn't told about it. The CIA was stunned, and the commanders in the field out there were stunned, because this was the solution to the security problem." Powell recalls phoning Rice who told him that Paul Bremer had made the decision and it would not be their place to overturn it. Then director of the Central Intelligence Agency George Tenet later wrote "We knew nothing about it until de-Baathification was a fait accompli... Clearly, this was a critical policy decision, yet there was no NSC Principals meeting to debate the move."

Another important actor in the creation of the policy of de-Ba'athification was exile leader of the Iraqi National Congress (INC) Ahmad Chalabi. Considered an unreliable informant by the CIA and the State Department, Chalabi was nonetheless influential within the Department of Defense's construction of a post-war occupation strategy for dealing with the Ba'ath Party. According to Rajiv Chandrasekaran, Douglas Feith, one of the primary architects of the de-Ba'athification policy, was heavily influenced by the ideas promoted by Chalabi and the Iraqi National Congress.

Other organizations and individuals involved in the process of challenging the implementation of the de-Ba'athification policy included the US Department of State, the CIA, Gen. Jay Garner, Col. Paul Hughes (Director of Strategic Policy for the US Occupation, 2003), Robert Hutchings (Chairman, 2003–2005, National Intelligence Council), Ambassador Barbara Bodine, and Col. Lawrence Wilkerson (Chief of Staff for Secretary of State Colin Powell, 2002–2005).

=== Precedents ===
In the previous post-war occupations of Germany and Japan, the United States, in partnership with other Allied Powers, pursued a policy of total removal of any influence related to Nazi or Imperial Japanese ideologies. These strategies are found in the Potsdam Agreement of 1945, the German Instrument of Surrender, and the General Order No. 1 for post-war Japan. The most frequently compared strategy was the US de-Nazification policy in post-war Germany.

== 100 Orders ==
During the tenure of the CPA, the Administrator, Paul Bremer, was charged with overseeing the US occupation and democratization process. As the highest authority in Iraq, orders issued from his office carried the force of law in Iraq. It was through CPA orders that Bremer and his administrative team enacted the policy of de-Ba'athification crafted in the Office of Special Plans at the Department of Defense. A total of 100 orders were issued by the CPA between May 2003 and June 2004.

=== Order No. 1 ===
Entering into force on 16 May 2003, Order No. 1, entitled "De-Ba'athification of Iraqi Society", describes the objectives of the de-Ba'athification policy developed by the Office of Special Plans.

Specifically, the order states that all members of the Ba'ath Party, from senior leadership to 'Udw (Member) are "removed from their positions and banned from future employment in the public sector." It demonstrates its broad sweep of society by stating:

Individuals holding positions in the top three layers of management in every national government ministry, affiliated corporations and other government institutions (e.g., universities and hospitals) shall be interviewed for possible affiliation with the Ba'ath Party, and subject to investigation for criminal conduct and risk to security.

=== Order No. 2 ===
Entering into force on 23 May 2003, Order 2, entitled Dissolution of Entities, extended the de-Ba'athification policy to cover not just party members, but governmental institutions and apparatuses and their subordinate or affiliate institutions or apparatuses. It also lays out the penalties for affiliation with these particular organizations or apparatuses. The order states that all entities and their subsidiaries listed in the Annex (which reserves the right to be amended to include new group) are "dissolved". Additionally, the financial assets of these entities were to be frozen, and placed under the purview of the CPA in order to finance the reconstruction effort. The order provides that pensions will continue to be paid to those dismissed under the Order, but such payments can be rescinded if it becomes apparent that the individual in whose name the pension was being paid committed crimes or was found to be a senior party member. Additionally, rewards would be paid to Iraqis who provided information "leading to the recovery of assets of Dissolved Entities". A full list of Dissolved Entities can be found in Annex A of the Order.

=== Order No. 4 ===
Entering into force on 25 May 2003, Order No. 4, entitled "Management of Property and Assets of the Iraqi Baath Party", is viewed as a continuation of the financial penalties and rules contained in Order No. 2. Within the preamble, the Order also mentions it is being promulgated "on behalf, and for the benefit, of the Iraqi people." It defines the assets of the Ba'ath Party as being any and all "movable and immovable property, records, data, cash, funds, realizable assets and liquid capital" that was either owned by the Ba'ath Party or by members of the Ba'ath Party as rewards, or such assets that they received without paying the full value.

Other aspects of the Order include the suspension of "all financial obligations of the Ba'ath Party". An appeals committee was also created by the Order, and the CPA was given authority to administer and use all assets seized "for the use and benefit of the Iraqi people". Additionally, the Iraqi de-Ba'athification Council was permitted to provide information to the CPA regarding the location of Ba'ath Party assets. Finally, concomitant with Order No. 2, failing to provide information regarding Ba'ath Party assets was a punishable offense, and under the terms of the Order, an individual could be fined $1000 USD or 1 year imprisonment. Both punishments were under the discretion of the Administrator.

=== Order No. 5 ===
Entering into force on 25 May 2003, Order No. 5, entitled "Establishment of the Iraqi De-Baathification Council", established the title entity, the Iraqi De-Ba'athification Council. The Council was to enforce Orders Nos. 1 and 4 at the discretion of the CPA Administrator or an Iraqi government. The Council was to be composed only of Iraqis, but selected by the Administrator and serving at his discretion. The Council was charged with the following duties provided the Administrator deemed the Council competent to fulfill these functions:

1. the extent, nature, location and current status of all Iraqi Baath Party property and assets including property and assets owned by Baath Party officials and members and any methods of concealment or distribution adopted to avoid detection;
2. the identity and whereabouts of Iraqi Baath Party officials and members involved in human rights violations and exploitations of the Iraqi people;
3. details of any criminal allegations that may be made against Iraqi Baath Party officials and members; and
4. any other information relevant to the Order for the De-Baathification of Iraqi Society, issued by the Administrator of the Coalition Provisional Authority on 16 May 2003... and the Order on the Management of Property and Assets of the Iraqi Baath Party.

Further duties of the Council included:

1. the most efficient and equitable means of eliminating the structure and means of intimidation and patronage of the Iraqi Baath Party;
2. a means of identifying and classifying Iraqi Baath Party officials and members;
3. the most efficient and equitable means of reclaiming Iraqi Baath Party property and assets; and
4. individuals who the Council considers should be exempt from the Order for the De-Baathification of Iraqi Society...

Another important clause in this Order was the fact that "any live testimony or written statements provided by individuals to the Council may not be tendered in evidence against them in any criminal proceedings." Consistent with other Orders, a monetary fine and possible imprisonment were the possible punishments for those who failed to comply with requests from the Council. Finally, the Administrator had authority over the Council and its decisions, and the Council was required to comply with all of the CPA's regulations.

Entering into force on 3 June 2003, an additional Memorandum entitled "Implementation of De-Ba'athification Order No. 1" describes the process by which the objectives described in Order No. 1 and Order No. 5 are to be carried out.

=== Order Memorandum No. 7 ===
Entering into force on 4 November 2003, the Memorandum entitled "Delegation of Authority Under De-Baathification Order No. 1" reflects a changing position of the CPA regarding the implementation and force of the De-Ba'athification policy expressed in Order No. 1. This change in position is reflected in the preamble which states, "Observing that under the prior regime some Iraqis may have become affiliated with the Baath Party for reasons not primarily related to their ideological beliefs..."

The memo, rescinding CPA Order No. 5, which created the Iraqi De-Ba'athification Council, instead defers the tasks of implementing Order No. 1 to the Governing Council's Supreme National De-Baathification Commission. While the powers and duties normally tasked to the CPA for the De-Ba'athification of Iraqi Society, were transferred to the Governing Council and its subsidiary entities, the CPA, within the memo, retained the authority to review actions by the Governing Council and its affiliates. Furthermore, any actions by the Governing Council and its affiliates deemed to cause a potential security risk were to be discussed with the CPA Administrator prior to implementation. The Governing Council and its affiliates were also held accountable by way of submitting monthly reports to the CPA regarding actions taken against Iraqi citizens, and the names of individuals hired to replace those removed under the criteria of Order No. 1.

=== Order No. 100 ===
The final order issued by the CPA entered into force on 30 June 2004 (but was written and signed 28 June 2004), and was titled "Transition of Laws, Regulations, Orders, and Directives Issued by the Coalition Provisional Authority". True to its title, the purpose of the order was to phase out the authority of the CPA and transfer power to the new "Interim Government of Iraq", which was to enter into force on the same day as the dissolution of the CPA, 30 June 2004.

The first sections of the order ensure that any previous issuances from the CPA cover all foreign personnel operating legally in Iraq. In other sections of the Order, previous Orders are "rescinded in [their] entirety". Finally, the Memorandum No. 7, which transferred CPA authority over the De-Ba'athification of Iraqi Society to the Supreme National De-Baathification Commission was rescinded by Order No. 100 only until such time that "the Iraqi Interim Government issues an order establishing the Independent Iraqi De-Ba'athification Council." In addition to this rescission, Memorandum No. 1 was also "rescinded in its entirety". In effect, Order No. 100 removes the authority and language of the CPA de-Ba'athification policy, but allows for its continuity under subsequent Iraqi governments.

== Implementation and enforcement ==
The process of implementing de-Ba'athification was complicated by the chaos following the initial invasion, and the general confusion of authority between ORHA's role in post-war reconstruction and the eventual creation of the CPA headed by Paul Bremer. The implementation of the policy was to be as rigorous as possible following the advice of Ahmad Chalabi that such rigor was necessary to "demonstrate America's commitment to a new political order in Iraq." Furthermore, the depth of implementation was necessary to show what were, in Bremer's view, "...clear, public and decisive steps to reassure Iraqis that we are determined to eradicate Saddamism." According to one critic of the policy, Ambassador Barbara Bodine stated that such a broad and deep attempt to remove and ostracize individuals from public life had never occurred in previous US occupations (i.e. Germany and Japan).

=== Order No. 1 Memorandum ===
Entering into force on 3 June 2003, the principal document regarding the implementation of de-Ba'athification was the CPA Memorandum Number 1 to Order Number 1. The guiding principle behind the memorandum was to be quick and penetrating by initially assigning the policy's enforcement to Coalition Forces and posting military investigators in all government ministries. Additionally, the memo calls for the use of civilian, and "professional Iraqis" in order to establish a presence within the ministries and expedite the process.

=== Enforcement Methods ===
The primary methods of implementation under the control of the CPA was through the judgment of investigators and Senior Ministry Advisors executing the punishments associated with being a member of the Ba'ath Party. Additionally, decisions made by the ARCs regarding exceptions and appeals were vetted by the CPA Administrator. Finally, the enforcement of this policy occurred at a broad and deep level. All ministries, per Memorandum No. 1, were assigned investigators to determine employees affiliation with the Ba'ath Party and determine which individuals were subject to the penalties under Order No. 1. The policy was carried out with rigor by the CPA and the Iraqi De-Ba'athification Council and subsequent bodies). In Bremer's own words, "It's the most important thing we've done here. And it's the most popular thing too," in reference to the de-Baathification policy.

=== Delegation of Enforcement Powers ===
Per the opening section of the Memorandum, the initial entity tasked with de-Ba'athification of Iraqi Society (CPA Order No. 1) were Coalition Forces and military investigators. Further delegation relied on military investigators and tribunal-style Accreditation Review Committees (ARCs) (ibid). The power structure followed a clear hierarchy with the CPA Administrator overseeing the executive authority of the Coalition Forces and eventually the Iraqi De-Baathification Council once the Administrator deemed the body competent to carry out these duties.

=== Coalition Provisional Authority (CPA) ===
The primary actors within this phase were the military or other investigators responsible for gathering data on employees within government ministries. They were authorized to gather information in a variety of ways, and based on the relevant facts determine if an individual was deemed to have an affiliation with the Ba'ath Party. The investigator was then to inform the individual of their right to appeal the "factual finding". Based on his information, unless an appeal was approved, the Senior Ministry Advisor [sic] would then take the appropriate actions to enforce CPA Order No. 1. Exceptions could be requested by ministries, but such requests must pass military investigators' judgment that such an individual is eligible for an exception. If the individual was eligible, then the investigator was to prepare the case for the exception.

Under the phase governed by the CPA, the ARCs were three-member military-civilian appeals panels under the authority of the Commander of Coalition Forces, who reported to the CPA Administrator. The purpose of the ARCs were to evaluate appeals by Iraqis who believed themselves to be wrongly deemed "Ba'athists". The ARC was to review applications and approve or deny the exceptions or appeals presented to them. All decisions were also subject to the approval of the administrator. The burden of proof in these cases fell on the individual to demonstrate that he or she was not a Ba'ath Party member under the criteria laid out in the Memorandum.

=== De-Ba'athification Council (IDC) ===
The phase under the De-Ba'athification Council (IDC) was only to occur when the Administrator determined "that the responsibility for identifying Ba'ath Party members [could] effectively... be transferred to Iraqi citizens..." Once this had occurred, all investigative authority would be delegated to the IDC. However, throughout the initial phase, the IDC would be encouraged to nominate individuals for the ARCs, as well as participate in the data gathering phase to prepare themselves for full assumption of duties. However, despite the possibility of taking over the investigative and determinative roles, the ARCs were to remain in place "until the people of Iraq adopt a representative form of self-government."

== Criteria for punitive action ==
The criteria for punitive action articulated in Memorandum No. 1 is any affiliation with the party. This reflects the general criteria of affiliation expressed in Order No. 1, in which an individual is subject to punishment if he or she is affiliated or known to be a member, of any level, within the Ba'ath Party. Furthermore, Order No. 4 states that individuals who have received any sort of property compensation or bonuses as a result of affiliation are subjected to dispossession of property.

The criteria for punishment were expansive, with the policy affecting any and all affiliated members. Only those who could clearly demonstrate that they were no longer members of the Ba'ath Party, prior to its dissolution by the CPA, and demonstrate that they were members for non-ideological reasons could hope to avoid the punishments of the policy.

== Impact ==
It is estimated that, before 2007, 50,000 civil government employees, as well as employees of other organizations listed in Annex A of Order No. 2, were removed from their positions as a result of de-Ba'athification. Another estimate places the number, also before 2007, at "100,000 civil servants, doctors, and teachers", were forcibly removed from the public sector due to low-level affiliation.

=== Affected occupations ===
The occupations affected by the de-Ba'athification policy include:

  - All civil servants in any government ministry affiliated with the Ba'ath Party
  - Occupations involving education (teachers and university professors)
  - Medical practitioners
  - All personnel affiliated with the Ministry of Defense and similar intelligence or military entities of government
- Individuals employed or affiliated with
  - The Presidential Diwan
  - The Presidential Secretariat
  - The Revolutionary Command Council
  - The National Assembly
  - The Youth Organization
  - National Olympic Committee
  - Revolutionary, Special, and National Security Courts

=== Military ===
Specifically, the Iraqi military was affected by Order No. 2. The Order called for the complete dissolution of the Iraqi military, and reportedly resulted in the unemployment and loss of pensions of approximately 500,000 individuals. The figures regarding this level of unemployment are approximately 27%. Many critics argue that this order specifically spurred the development of an armed insurgency.

=== Public servants ===
An explicit figure regarding the dismissal of judges and prosecutors is available. Of 860 judges and prosecutors, 656 were reviewed and 176 were removed from their positions within the Ministry of Justice. In compensation, 185 new judges and prosecutors were hired. Furthermore, the general elimination of engineers, directors, and technocrats meant that Iraqi government ministries had difficulty in fulfilling their duties to Iraqi citizens.

=== Education ===
Within the education sector, the Historical Review of CPA Achievements states that 12,000 teachers, headmasters, and headmistresses were removed from the Ministry of Education and schools. The review also states that 32,000 were given training to replace removed employees, but other sources, such as Rajiv Chandrasekaran's book Imperial Life in the Emerald City: Inside Iraq's Green Zone, describes how Sunni dominated areas were left with only one or two schoolteachers as a result of de-Ba'athification.

=== Political impact ===
The majority of sources are negative when discussing the policy's political impact. Most see the de-Ba'athification policy as undemocratic, and unnecessarily alienated Sunni Arabs from participating in the government. An al-Jazeera article dated 18 November 2003 discusses the future of the Ba'ath Party, but also questions the validity of likening the Ba'ath Party to the Nazi Party, as well as the dissolution of the Ba'ath Party and the possible impact on Iraqi society. Another al-Jazeera article interviews a Ba'ath Party member that suggests that attempting to remove all Ba'athists from the public sector because of the actions of Saddam and some of the leaders both goes against constitutional principles, but practically will not allow for the creation of a legitimate political system in the eyes of many Iraqis. Finally, International Crisis Group issued a brief in 2003 to the effect that the de-Ba'athification policy created serious challenges to the legitimacy of any future government, unless all Iraqis, except those guilty of crimes, are allowed to participate in the government. There are however, sources that discuss the positive impact on Iraqi political culture. A report written by a researcher from the Washington Institute for Near East Policy, a research institute in Washington, D.C., advocates a carefully calculated de-Ba'athification program, particularly in the political and security arenas as a way of laying the foundation for successful regime change. A briefing given by Ahmad Chalabi at the American Enterprise Institute also describes the necessity of removing Ba'athist elements from Iraqi society as part of creating a successful framework in which to build a new Iraqi political system. Finally, the Iraqi National Congress has two articles entitled "De-Ba'athification is the Cornerstone in Fighting Terrorism", and "Uprooting Fascism", in which both articles argue that removing the Ba'ath Party, and its influence is the most effective way to create a democratic Iraq.

=== Parties ===
As a result of De-Ba'athification, many Sunni Arabs were excluded from public service, and the democratic process in general, because the vast majority of members of the Ba'ath Party during its rule were nominally Sunni Arabs. This created a significant gap in participation between Shi'a Arab and Kurdish and Sunni Arab organizations in what became the new public/political sphere.

=== Representation ===
The overall alienation experienced by many Sunni Arabs reflected in their lack of representation in the initial formations of governments because of high affiliation with the Ba'ath Party within the Sunni Arab population. Because the initial severity of the policy excluded so many from public life, few leaders within the Sunni Arab community were willing or capable of forming legal organizations that could participate in the public political sphere. As a consequence many Sunni Arabs chose to boycott the electoral process, protesting what they felt was a policy which excluded and discriminated against Sunni Arabs as a minority group.

==== Sunnis ====
The Sunnis hardly participated in the January 2005 Iraqi parliamentary elections, due to a boycott initiated by the major Sunni Arab parties.

Juan Cole, a noted U.S. historian and commentator on the Middle East, suggested in August 2005 that the boycott had been partly caused by the punitive policies towards ex-Baathists, and thus towards the Sunni Arabs, conducted by the then current Iraqi Transitional Government dominated by Shiite and Kurdish parties; former Baath Party members couldn't hold high government posts, yet generally hadn't been convicted of any crime as persons. Cole warned that the U.S. needed to combat this commitment to de-Ba'athification of the then-current Iraqi government "if the Sunni Arabs are going to be drawn into the new government".

The fact that Sunnis suffered the most from the de-Ba'athification is presumed to also have contributed to the rise of several committed and deadly 'Sunni' insurgent groups immediately following the U.S.-led 2003 occupation.

==== Shi'a ====
As a result of many Sunni Arab political leaders being removed from participation in the future democracy of Iraq, many dissident domestic, and exiled Shi'a political leaders formed many political parties and organizations, and came to be seen as dominant in the government. This was also a generally expected result given the Shi'a in Iraq are a religious majority in Iraq.

==== Kurds ====
Within the Kurdish population, the idea behind de-Ba'athification was generally supported. Due to a history of government oppression of the Kurds, such as the Anfal Operations, there was general animosity among the Kurdish populations toward the Ba'athist regime. As a result of their political formation as an ethnic bloc, the Kurds have performed well in elections, taking a prominent position within the national government

=== Elections and candidates ===
One of the more problematic aspects of de-Ba'athification came not in the 2003–2004 time frame, but during the later years when Iraqis had a great deal more sovereignty over their political affairs.

In the first elections in Iraq in January 2005, Sunnis got only 17 seats in a 275-member parliament, for unclear reasons but perhaps linked to their boycotting those elections. More recently, de-Ba'athification policies have been cited as reasons for the political stalemate resulting from the March 2010 parliamentary elections, in which numerous Sunni candidates were disqualified.

=== Beneficiaries ===
In the letter of the Orders, the primary beneficiaries of the de-Ba'athification policy were the Iraqi people. The policy was enacted for their benefit and welfare, recognizing that they had suffered under the Ba'athist regime of Saddam Hussein. However, other beneficiaries of these policies included dissidents within Iraq and the exiles that returned to Iraq following the US invasion.

==== Politicians and Dissidents ====
One of the groups that benefited from the de-Ba'athification policy was the Iraqi National Congress (INC), a dissident Iraqi political movement-in-exile, headed by Dr. Ahmad Chalabi. The INC benefited primarily from the fact that it had close associations with the US government prior to the invasion, and the prominent role it, and Chalabi, played in the formation of many of the policy positions for the US government.

Ahmad Chalabi played a prominent role in US policy regarding de-Ba'athification, and was selected to preside over some of the review committees, and was the head of the Iraqi De-Ba'athification Council per CPA Order 5.

=== Economic impact ===
One of the more visible manifestations of the de-Ba'athification policy was in its economic impact. Although the general purpose of the series of orders was to remove the Ba'athist influence form Iraqi society in order to foster a political environment conducive to democracy, the policy explicitly removed individuals from public sector employment and prevented them from any such future employment, impacting Iraq's economic capabilities, whether or not it was intended. The impact was mainly felt by a general inability for government ministries to provide the services required for a functioning economy. In general, the policy crippled the provision of services in one of two ways: government ministries functioned at less than optimum capacity because of incompetent leadership following the removal of Ba'athist technocrats, or government ministries effectively ceased to function as a result of Ba'athist technocrats removed under de-Ba'athification.

==== Lost productivity ====
Linking de-Ba'athification with lost productivity of the Iraqi economy is difficult because it is hard to separate what can reasonably be attributed as lost productivity from the removal of thousands of Ba'ath party member civil servants from damage to infrastructure from looting and the invasion campaign. However, it is likely that Iraq's economic output was hindered by the de-Ba'athification policy because of the large size of the public sector in Iraq, which was crippled by the de-Ba'athification policy. As a result, many ministries were left understaffed.

==== Lack of basic services ====
There is general agreement among analysts of the de-Ba'athification policy, both critics and proponents, that one of the deleterious effects was the loss of vital public services. The loss of these services comes from the general reality that many Ba'ath Party members were technocrats within government ministries, meaning that they had specific skillsets that allowed them to fulfill necessary government functions effectively. This point is also echoed among disenfranchised Ba'ath Party members, who state that they ought to be allowed to participate in government because they are capable of running the necessary government offices and programs to help bring stability to Iraq. Juan Cole, an American academic, also notes that the exclusion of many capable Ba'ath Party members has crippled the country's recovery.

However, some scholars, such as Timothy Naftali argue that all individuals must be vetted and their histories known before they can return to the public sector. He compares the use of ex-Nazi intelligence officials after the defeat of Nazi Germany purely because it was expedient.

Rajiv Chandrasekaran's Imperial Life in the Emerald City: Inside Iraq's Green Zone gives a general account of the general lack of services provided by ministries that were affected by de-Ba'athification as a result of being affiliated with the Ba'ath Party state apparatus. The removal of many civil servant staff reduced the ability for ministries such as Health, Finance, Education, Electricity, Foreign, Industry, Interior, and Information. A particular instance of de-Ba'athification crippling the ability of a ministry to function was the case of the Ministry of Finance. Many mid-level ministry employees were fired because of connections to the Ba'ath Party, which left the ministry grossly understaffed.

==== Government competency ====
Government competency was greatly diminished by the de-Ba'athification process because many skilled individuals within the basic ministries of government were removed from their posts. As a result, many basic services either were not available, or did not function properly as a result of the removal of skilled, knowledgeable individuals. Those who generally argue that government functioning was crippled as a result of de-Ba'athification also argue that government competence decreased as well. Proponents of de-Ba'athification, such as Ahmad Chalabi, argued that similarly qualified, non-Ba'athist Iraqis exist to fill the positions left open by removed Ba'athists. The major shortage of appropriately skilled workers subsequently showed that this was not the case, and proponents significantly underestimated the time required to replace and train much of the public sector workforce.

Rajiv Chandrasekaran also notes that many Iraqis with technical skills were required to be members of the Ba'ath Party in order to advance in their careers, or even get admitted to the necessary colleges. As such, many Iraqis removed under the de-Ba'athification program expressed frustration that they were being targeted for membership when it was a de facto requirement for career advance, and had little to do with their personal ideologies or political positions.

==== Unemployment ====
Unemployment reached as high as 27% as a result of the military dissolution according to some figures. Juan Cole suggests the number was probably closer to 50%, while Rajiv Chandrasekaran estimates the unemployment rate at approximately 40%. It is not entirely clear that the totality of unemployment is purely a result of de-Ba'athification, as some unemployment resulted from combat-damaged infrastructure. However, the public sector clearly suffered a great deal as a result of de-Ba'athification and the disbanding of the Iraqi military and affiliated entities with conservative job-loss estimates in the thousands.

==== Pensions ====
The loss of pensions contributed to the poverty of many of those affected by the de-Ba'athification policy. Few sources have commented on this particular aspect of the policy, and its impact on the lives of affected Iraqis. An NPR interview with several Iraqi directors who were recently removed from their positions within the banking industry, shows how devastating not only the prospect of unemployment, but the interviewee bemoans his loss of a pension after all his years of work. The point noted by International Crisis Group's assessment of thousands of young unemployed Iraqis, without the possibility of employment or a future pension is a dangerous factor within an occupation scenario.

=== Social impact ===
Socially, the policy had the effect of isolating and segmenting the population. Sunni Arabs became guilty by association with the Ba'ath Party's crimes, and in turn Sunni Arabs became defensive, and isolated from other communities. This fragmentation was also noted as a detrimental side effect of the de-Ba'athification policy by Juan Cole, who stated that "Sunni Arabs need to be reassured that they are not going to be the low people on the totem pole in the new Iraq."

==== Crime ====
Another highly visible effect of de-Ba'athification was the removal of an effective police force controlled by the Interior Ministry. In addition to the general chaos of Iraq following the initial invasion, looting and vandalism were rampant, and led to the destruction of the Interior and Industry Ministries, responsible for internal order and security and state-owned businesses respectively. Damage estimates as a result of the looting, a great deal of which occurred prior to the de-Ba'athification Order but was likely exacerbated by the unemployment spike created by de-Ba'athification, were placed at approximately $400 million. In Charles Ferguson's book No End in Sight: Iraq's Descent into Chaos, he notes that during the 2003–2004 period the number of crimes committed greatly exceeded the crippled Interior Ministry's police force and CPA authorities abilities to prevent crime, conduct investigations, and establish general order in Iraq.

==== Unrest ====
As a result of being fired, many Iraqi soldiers and Ba'ath Party members protested outside their former places of employment or in squares where they would be visible to Coalition Forces and the CPA. With the unemployment rate exacerbated by de-Ba'athification, the unrest of previously employed civil servants and military personnel contributed to the overall decay of the security situation in Iraq.

==== Sectarian relations ====
In Anthony Shadid's book Night Draws Near: Iraq's People in the Shadow of America's War, he describes several Iraqis who exhibit a high degree of tolerance for the different religions within Iraq. Some of his interlocutors highlighted intermarriage among Iraqis as evidence for the minimal weight placed on sectarian divisions.

One of the main concerns regarding the de-Ba'athification strategy was that it would both create new sectarian tensions in Iraq, and exacerbate pre-invasion tensions. To the extent that this occurred, many in Iraq expressed some amount of concern over the potential for sectarian divisions to shape Iraqi social and political life. As a result of de-Ba'athification and other government structuring policies, sectarian divisions increased, with the result of Sunni Arabs, prominently represented in the Ba'ath Party, feeling increasingly isolated from Iraqi political and social life.

=== Security impact ===
The security impact of the de-Ba'athification policy and the Order No. 2 disbanding the military were devastating in terms of their security impact. One of the most senior military officials in the United States, Admiral Mike Mullen states that the de-Ba'athification policy coupled with the disbanding of the Iraqi military created security problems, and unnecessary sectarian tension. The Admiral stated that the Iraqi military could have been used to help secure the country more quickly, but instead its disbandment contributed to the overall decay in security. Other observers of the Iraq War conclude that the disbandment of the Iraqi military, coupled with de-Ba'athification fueled, if not created the insurgency against Coalition Forces. Regarding the security issues with Sunni Arab insurgents, Sunni Insurgent leaders met with Zalmay Khalilzad, former US Ambassador to Iraq, and stated that they would end their insurgency if some guarantees would be granted, among them the "Reform of the de-Ba'athification program..."

==== Growth of insurgency ====
Most sources regarding the Iraq War generally agree that CPA policies, such as de-Ba'athification and CPA Order Number 2 disbanding the Iraqi military and other security apparatuses exacerbated or created the insurgency in Iraq. Supporting this view is Rajiv Chandrasekaran's conversation with a former soldier in the Iraqi Army:

Chandrasekaran: "What happened to everyone there? Did they join the new army?"
Soldier: "They're all insurgents now. Bremer lost his chance."

This quote also reveals that the insurgency was not only a means of expressing anger at a Coalition occupation of Iraq, but also motivated by economic and employment necessities. With thousands of ostracized Ba'ath Party members and hundreds of thousands of soldiers rendered unemployed, joining the insurgency could provide a means to a monthly income to provide for one's family "in a land bereft of jobs".

One of the other reasons for the growth of a specifically Sunni insurgency was the fact that they felt alienated by the de-Ba'athfication policy and saw the insurgency as a means of retaliation. Additionally, Chandrasekaran cited the CPA's inability to adequately provide services as a motivation for individuals to join the insurgency in order to retaliate against the power perceived as responsible for their plight.

== Repeal and transfer of authority ==
The CPA administered process of de-Ba'athification came to an end on 30 June 2004 with the transfer of sovereignty to the Iraqi Interim Government. In many ways however, the wording of the policy was such that it continued to be in effect after the CPA was dissolved. The only real difference was that it was administered by the Interim Government's Independent Iraqi De-Ba'athification Council, rather than a council under the CPA.

=== Transfer of authority from Coalition Provisional Authority to Iraqi Interim Government ===
Although most of the authority for enforcing the de-Ba'athification policy had been delegated to the Higher National De-Ba'athification Council, which was created by the Iraqi Governing Council by 4 November 2003 per Memorandum No. 7, CPA Order No. 100 was an important delegating order. The language within the Order is mixed. Within the preamble of the Order, it is made clear that according to the Transitional Administrative Law all promulgations from the CPA remain in effect unless rescinded by "legislation duly enacted". However, on the same page, the Order also states that in recognition of transferring sovereignty to the Interim Iraqi Government, "require technical amendment and/or rescission to properly reflect the full transfer of governing authority..."

The Order provides for the rescission and amendments of some decrees of the CPA, but also provides for the full sovereignty of these laws under the Iraqi Interim Government, and subsequent governments, such that any decrees deemed to reflect the will of the Iraqi people may be retained. According to the Order, most de-Ba'athification Orders were rescinded, such as Order Nos. 4 and 5, but the crucial Order Nos. 1 and 2 remain. Thus, de-Ba'athification is to remain in effect, unless removed by force of legislation from a duly elected Iraqi governing body. As a result of the language of Order No. 100, fully sovereignty over the de-Ba'athification policy was transferred from the CPA to the Iraqi Interim Government and subsequent governments.

== Revised de-Ba'athification ==
=== Gradual process of reintegrating Ba'athists ===
Despite the maintenance of the general de-Ba'athification policy, a recognition of the overly broad strength of the initial policy occurred in late 2003 (4 November 2003). This change in understanding was reflected in Memorandum No. 7. However, it was not until 2004, that the policy of reintegrating Ba'athists was given a priority. According to stories from the period in question, the focus on changing the policy occurred as the difficulties faced in the reconstruction mounted.

=== Accountability and Justice Act (2008) ===
The revised de-Ba'athification policy did not come at the hands of the US government, Coalition Provisional Authority, rather it came through legislation enacted by the Iraqi Parliament on 12 January 2008. The legislation, entitled the Accountability and Justice Act reflects the US desire to see competent individuals return to the folds of government, and also providing less incentive for Sunni Arabs to feel ostracized and sympathetic to insurgency. The law allows for "about 30,000 fourth ranking Baathists" to be eligible for public sector employment, and approximately 3,500 in "top three party ranks" could be eligible for pensions. Additionally, al-Jazeera and al-Arabiya noted the change in US stance in 2004.

The Accountability and Justice Act of 2008 reforms the practice of de-Baathification, making the de-Baathification Commission permanent and extending de-Baathification to the judiciary, while reinstating jobs and pensions to low-ranking members of the ousted Arab Socialist Ba'ath Party – Iraq Region. After Vice President Tariq al-Hashimi refused to sign, the controversial law was passed by a majority vote by the Presidency Council.

=== Criticism ===
Iraqi diplomat Feisal al-Istrabadi, lead drafter of the 2004 Transitional Administrative Law, criticized the overreach of Paul Bremer's De-Ba'athification policy, which "captured a large number of people who were innocent of any wrongdoing by any objective measure and were deprived of the ability to earn a living and support their families," thereby feeding the insurgency. Furthermore, though the majority of Ba'ath members were Shia, it was the Sunnis who were disproportionately removed from offices, to the extent that the latter called it "de-Sunnification". al-Istrabadi considered the 2008 Accountability and Justice Act's revised policy a positive step toward reconciliation, depending on how the law would be applied.

Despite trends toward easing the restrictions on individuals removed as a result of de-Ba'athification, in regard to parliamentary elections, Sunni Arab candidates continue to feel threatened by the continuing de-Ba'athification under various de-Ba'athification Commissions or the newly created Justice and Accountability Commission. Kenneth Katzman of the Congressional Research Service notes that during the 2010 parliamentary elections, it was believed that the Justice and Accountability Council was used to bar Sunni Arab candidates as a way to ensure that the Council of Representatives would remain controlled by Shi'a political coalitions. Evidence for this accusation is the reversal of the initial ruling by appeals courts that individuals initially disqualified could run, and their Ba'athist ties could be dealt with after the election. However, allegedly from pressure by Maliki's governing coalition, the court reversed its decision, and announced the 145 of 171 candidates appealing the decision (out of a total of 499) were disqualified. Additionally, critics of the election state that party leaders Saleh al-Mutlaq and Dhafir al-Ani were barred from running. Finally, an additional 55 candidates primarily from Iyad Allawi's Iraqi National Movement (composed of Shi'a and Sunni candidates) were disqualified the night before the election.

This reflects the general attitude captured by press organizations such as NPR and al-Jazeera that de-Ba'athification continues to be problematic particularly for Sunni candidates.

== Post-Assad era in Syria ==
In Syria, the birthplace of the Ba'ath Party, the Assad family's more than half-century of rule has also come to an end after a bloody civil war. However, unlike Iraq, the Syrian transitional government has retained some of the Ba'athist era administrative officials to quell potential unrest. The removal of the Assadist influence has led to clashes between the remnants of the Ba'athist regime and the new Syrian government. This has also led to the spread of Anti-Shiism against the Alawite Shia community in western Syria.

== See also ==
- Ba'ath Party (Iraqi-dominated faction)
  - Arab Socialist Ba'ath Party – Iraq Region
- Politics of Iraq
- Sectarian violence against Sunni Arabs in Iraq
- Fall of the Assad regime
- Denazification
- Decommunization
  - Lustration

== Notes ==
=== References ===
- Al-'Abidi, 'A.S. "De-Ba`athification in Iraq Continues" Archived 11 March 2010 at the Wayback Machine. Al-Jazeera, Arabic. 5 March 2010.
- Accountability and Justice Law (unofficial translation by the International Center for Transitional Justice). January 2008.
- Agence France Presse. "Bremer: Thousands of Ba`athists Will Return to Work". Al-Arabiya, Arabic. 24 April 2004.
- Al-Jazeera and Press Agencies. "The Occupation Eases De-Ba`athification and Gives Time to the Resistance in Fallujah" Archived 8 February 2005 at the Wayback Machine. Al-Jazeera, Arabic. 22 April 2004.
- All Things Considered. "Fairness of ‘De-Baathification’ Questioned". NPR. 7 October 2003.
- American Enterprise Institute. "From De-Bolshevism to De-Baathification: Post-Soviet Europe’s Lessons for Iraq after Saddam." October 2004. http://www.aei.org/EMStaticPage/912?page=Summary Archived 21 April 2014 at the Wayback Machine
- American Enterprise Institute. "Remaking Iraq: Success, Failure, and the Foundation of a New State." October 2005. http://www.aei.org/EMStaticPage/1120?page=Summary Archived 21 April 2014 at the Wayback Machine
- American Enterprise Institute. "Toward Democracy: A Briefing by Ahmad Chalabi." January 2004. http://www.aei.org/EMStaticPage/739?page=Summary Archived 21 April 2014 at the Wayback Machine
- American Experience. "Truman." PBS. 1997. https://www.pbs.org/wgbh/amex/truman/psources/ps_potsdam.html Archived 31 October 2010 at the Wayback Machine
- Behind Closed Doors. "WWII: Stalin, he Nazis, and the West." PBS. 2009. https://www.pbs.org/behindcloseddoors/pdfs/TermsOfGermanSurrender.pdf Archived 13 November 2012 at the Wayback Machine
- British Broadcasting Company. "Britain 'tried to keep Iraq army." 9 December 2006. http://news.bbc.co.uk/2/hi/uk_news/6165223.stm
- Blitzer, W. "From 'de-Baathification' to 're-Baathification'?." CNN. 22 April 2004. http://www.cnn.com/2004/US/04/22/Iraq.rebaathification/index.html?iref=allsearch
- Cerami, J., and Boggs, J., eds. The Interagency and Counterinsurgency Warfare: Aligning and Integrating Military and Civilian Roles in Stability, Security, Transition, and Reconstruction Operations. Strategic Studies Institute: Carlisle, PA, December 2007. Archived 5 November 2010 at the Wayback Machine
- Chandrasekaran, R. Imperial Life in the Emerald City: Inside Iraq's Green Zone. New York: Vintage Books, 2006.
- "Coalition Provisional Authority Order Number 1: De-Ba'athification of Iraqi Society." 16 May 2003. https://web.archive.org/web/20040621014307/http://www.iraqcoalition.org/regulations/20030516_CPAORD_1_De-Ba_athification_of_Iraqi_Society_.pdf
- "Coalition Provisional Authority Memorandum Number 1: Implementation of De-Ba`athification Order Number 1 (CPA/ORD/16 May 2003/01)." 3 June 2003. http://www.iraqcoalition.org/regulations/20030603_CPAMEMO_1_Implementation_of_De-Ba_athification.pdf
- "Coalition Provisional Authority Order Number 2: Dissolution of Entities." 23 May 2003. https://web.archive.org/web/20040701202042/http://iraqcoalition.org/regulations/20030823_CPAORD_2_Dissolution_of_Entities_with_Annex_A.pdf
- Coalition Provisional Authority Order Number 4: Management of Property and Assets of the Iraqi Baath Party. 25 May 2003.
- Coalition Provisional Authority Order Number 5: Establishment of the Iraqi De-Baathification Council. 25 May 2003.
- Coalition Provisional Authority Order Number 100: Transition of Laws, Regulations, Orders, and Directives Issued by the Coalition Provisional Authority. 28 June 2004.
- Coalition Provisional Authority Memorandum Number 7: Delegation of Authority under De-Baathification Order No. 1 (CPA/ORD/16 May 2003/1). 4 November 2003.
- Crane, C., and Terrill, A. "Reconstructing Iraq: Insights, Challenges, and Missions for Military Forces in a Post-Conflict Scenario" Archived 6 November 2010 at the Wayback Machine. Strategic Studies Institute: Carlisle, PA, February 2003.
- Da’ud, M. "The Iraqi Resistance... Remnants of a Past and Foundations of a Future" Archived 6 May 2005 at the Wayback Machine. Al-Jazeera, Arabic. 1 December 2003.
- Democracy Now!. "Juan Cole’s 10-Point Plan for U.S. Troop Withdrawal from Iraq". Amy Goodman interview with Dr. Juan Cole. 23 August 2005.
- Ferguson, C. No End in Sight: Iraq’s Descent into Chaos. DVD. Directed by Charles Ferguson. New York, NY: Magnolia Pictures, 2007.
- Ferguson, C. No End in Sight: Iraq's Descent into Chaos. New York: PublicAffairs, 2008.
- Hendrickson, D., and Tucker, R. "Revisions in Need of Revising: What Went Wrong in the Iraq War". Strategic Studies Institute: Carlisle, PA, December 2005.
- International Crisis Group. "Baghdad: A Race Against the Clock". Middle East Briefing No. 6. June 2003.
- Katzman, K. "Iraq: Politics, Elections, Benchmarks" (PDF). Congressional Research Service, RS 21968 (August 2010).
- Kaufmann, G, ed. "Stability Operations and State Building: Continuities and Contingencies" Archived 5 November 2010 at the Wayback Machine. Colloquium Report. Strategic Studies Institute: Carlisle, PA, October 2008.
- Kenner, D. and Swift, A. "Foreign Policy: The Guide to Iraqi Elections". NPR. 5 March 2010.
- Kenyon, P. "Iraq’s Baath Party Members Still Political Targets". Morning Edition. NPR. 11 May 2010.
- Al-Khattab, F. "The Future of the Ba`ath Party in Iraq" Archived 25 February 2005 at the Wayback Machine. Al-Jazeera, Arabic. 23 March 2004.
- King, J. "Policy easing to bring Baathists into new Iraq". CNN. 22 April 2004.
- Mason, D. Sustaining the Peace After Civil War Archived 5 November 2010 at the Wayback Machine. Strategic Studies Institute: Carlisle, PA, December 2007.
- Morning Edition. "De-Baathification and the Rebuilding of Iraq". NPR. 21 April 2005.
- Morning Edition. "Comparing De-Nazification and De-Baathification". NPR. 25 June 2004.
- NPR News Blog. "Mullen’s Plain Talk About U.S. Mistakes in Iraq". NPR. 1 August 2007.
- Prados, J. "PR Push for Iraq War Preceded Intelligence Findings: US Intelligence and Iraq WMD". The National Security Archive Electronic Briefing Book No. 254. Washington: DC, The National Security Archive. 22 August 2008.
- Al-Qasim, F. "The Future of the Ba`ath Party in Iraq" Archived 11 April 2005 at the Wayback Machine. Al-Jazeera, Arabic. 18 November 2003.
- Al-Samawi, M. "Uprooting Fascism". 27 January 2010.
- Senate Select Committee on Intelligence. "The Use by the Intelligence Committee of Information Provided by the Iraqi National Congress" (PDF). 8 September 2006
- Shadid, A. Night Draws Near: Iraq's People in the Shadow of America's War. New York: Henry Holt and Company, 2005.
- Sissons, M. "Briefing Paper: Iraq’s New "Accountability and Justice" Law" (PDF). International Center for Transitional Justice. January 2008.
- Al-Ta’ie, A. "De-Ba`athification is the Cornerstone in Fighting Terrorism". 4 May 2009.
- Taiwan Documents Project. "Supreme Commander for the Allied Powers General Order No. 1".
- Tyler, Patrick E. (14 May 2003). "New policy in Iraq to authorize G.I.'s to shoot looters". The New York Times.
- "An Historic Review of CPA Accomplishments". Coalition Provisional Authority. p. 22. Archived from the original on 16 June 2010.
