= Accountability and Justice Act =

The Accountability and Justice Act (Arabic: على قانون المساءلة والعدالة, romanized: qanun al-musa' ala wa al-adala) of 2008 is a legislative act passed by the Iraqi Council of Representatives in January 2008.

The law reformed the practice of de-Baathification, extending de-Baathification to the judiciary, while reinstating jobs and pensions to low-ranking members of the ousted Baath Party. The De-Ba'athification Council was made permanent though renamed to Accountability and Justice Commission and reformed in scope and policy.

The law was passed by the Council of Representatives on 12 January 2008, with only 140 out of 275 members being present. After Vice President Tariq al-Hashimi refused to sign, the controversial law was passed by a majority vote by the Presidency Council.

== Details ==
The law defines de-Baathification as "The procedures… to intellectually, administratively, politically, culturally and economically dismantle the Ba’ath Party system in Iraqi society, state institutions, and civil society institutions." The Ba'ath Party is recognized as the party "which took power on 17/07/1968 and [was] prohibited by article (7) of the Iraqi constitution." A member of the Ba'ath Party, subject to the penalties of the law is defined as, "any individual who joined the Ba'ath Party and gave an oath of allegiance to it." Collaborators are defined as any individual who worked with or benefited from the Ba'ath Party.

The next sections of the law detail the composition and qualifications of the members of the Commission, and the purposes of the Commission. The stated goal of the Commission is similar to the Coalition Provisional Authority's (CPA) goal of eliminating any and all traces of Ba'ath Party ideology, in any manifestation, from the political, social, and economic life of Iraq. Additionally, the Commission has the duty of compiling the names and information about members to be maintained in archives that document the Ba'athist period in Iraqi history. Iraqis allowed to return to work in the government are those who held low level positions in the Ba'ath Party are allowed to return to work in some public sector jobs. However, several key positions and ministries are still barred from these individuals. Additionally, anyone who profited from being a member of the Ba'ath Party, is barred from additional posts in the public sector. There is also the possibility that certain individuals will be eligible for pensions, and the law also creates an appeals process for those deemed subject to its penalties. Finally, the end of the law provides the Commission’s composition, and the justifications for the law.

According to the International Centre for Transitional Justice, the new Justice and Accountability Act is not exactly the reconciliatory reform envisioned. It maintains most of the structures of the Higher National De-Ba'athification Council (or Independent Iraqi De-Ba'athification Council), and in some cases expands the power of the council to previously immune ministries. However, the ability for some previously excluded Iraqis to obtain some form of public sector work, and the extension of pensions to some Ba'ath Party members are considered positive developments by the International Centre for Transitional Justice. In reality, the law provides for some protections previously withheld from affected Iraqis while maintaining the structure of CPA Order Nos. 1 and 2, and in some cases expanding upon the powers within those Orders.

== Debate and legislative procedure ==
The Accountability and Justice Act was passed on 12 January 2008 as the 10th law passed by the Council of Representatives in that year. However, only 140 out of 275 members were present. After Vice President Tariq al-Hashimi refused to sign, the controversial law was passed by a majority vote by the Presidency Council. The act is considered as a "chance of pensions or even reinstatement in their former jobs" for the Baath members by the Western politicians.

== Reactions ==
Iraqi diplomat Feisal al-Istrabadi, lead drafter of the 2004 Transitional Administrative Law, praised the law as correcting the overreach of Paul Bremer's original De-Ba'athification decrees, which "captured a large number of people who were innocent of any wrongdoing by any objective measure and were deprived of the ability to earn a living and support their families," thereby feeding the insurgency. Furthermore, though the majority of Ba'ath members were Shia, it was the Sunnis who were disproportionately removed from offices, to the extent that the latter called it "de-Sunnification". Whether the new was a positive step toward reconciliation, depended on how the law would be applied.

De-Baathification initiatives were largely criticized as mass dismissals without due process undermined Iraqi government and military organizations. They furthered grievance amongst those directly affected, along with their families, friends and communities. It is suspected that these processes were a contributing factor in widespread social and political conflict.

== Literature ==
- International Centre for Transitional Justice, ed. (1 January 2008). "Accountability and Justice Law".
