= National Vanguard Party =

Political party in Mauritania

National Vanguard Party حزب الطليعة الوطني Parti Avant-Garde nationale
- Leader: Mohamed Ould Abdellahi Ould Eyye
- Founded: 1991
- Ideology: Ba'athism; Saddamism
- International affiliation: Iraqi-led Ba'ath Party
- Colors: Black, Red, White and Green (Pan-Arab colors)

Party flag

The National Vanguard Party (Arabic: حزب الطليعة الوطني, romanized: Hizb Al-Taliyeh Al-Watani, French: Parti Avant-Garde nationale or PAGN), is an illegal political party in Mauritania. It is the Mauritanian regional branch of the Iraqi-led Arab Socialist Ba'ath Party (Arabic: حزب البعث العربي الاشتراكي, transliterated: Hizb Al-Ba'ath Al-'Arabi Al-Ishtiraki).

== History ==
=== Original Ba'ath movement ===
The first pro-Iraqi Ba'athist activities in Mauritania began in 1968, but nothing was organizationally established until 1972. The Mauritanian Ba'athists divide their history into two phases; founding (1976–1982) and deployment (1982–1990). There is little available information on the 1968–1970 period, and Ba'athist activity started in earnest in the early 1970s. The party's first clandestine congress was held in 1976. They opposed the rule of Moktar Ould Daddah and used most of their early years in trying to infiltrate the ruling Mauritanian People's Party and state institutions. In the aftermath of the 1978 coup, the Ba'ath branch took the conscious decision of trying to recruit Haratin people. They started publishing The Baʿth and the Haratine in Mauritania to help them in their quest. In the period 1978–1984 the party intensified its effort of recruiting members within the Military establishment. The Ba'ath party was one of the most fervent supporters of the Arabization policies in Mauritania. Because of their efforts Mohammed Yehdih Ould Breideleil, the Ba'ath leader, was appointed Minister of Information for a short period in 1984. Under the rule of Mohamed Khouna Ould Haidalla, the Ba'ath were harassed, and in between 1982 and 1983 55 Ba'athists were arrested by the Government. However, by 1986–1987 the Ba'athists had managed to infiltrate the officer corps and the enlisted ranks, making them a threat to Ould Taya and his regime. Ould Taya, with Saddam Hussein's approval, expelled and banned Ba'athist personnel in the military in 1988. With Iraq's invasion of Kuwait, the Ba'ath party lost its popular appeal, and the financial aid from the Iraqi embassy dried up. By 1990, there wasn't much left of the original Ba'ath movement.

=== National Vanguard Party ===
The party was founded in 1991, during the Gulf War, replacing the old Ba'ath movement which had disintegrated in 1990. It remains the largest Arab nationalist political force in the country. The party has maintained good relations with the Baghdad-based Ba'ath Party even after Saddam Hussein's downfall following the 2003 invasion of Iraq. The party was able to field candidates for seats in parliament during the 1992 parliamentary elections, and was the only party, with the exception of the Republican Party for Democracy and Renewal (PRDS), to field candidates for the Senate elections. However, the party secured only 1 percent of the vote nationwide, and did not secure a seat in neither parliament nor senate. Kabry Ould Taleb Jiddou, the party's leader, was rewarded the office of Secretary of State by the newly elected Government because of his electoral campaign.

The branch supports full Arabization of the country, a view considered racist by critics. President Mohamed Khouna Ould Haidalla introduced an anti-Ba'athist policy when in power (1980–1984). This policy was continued under his successor President Maaouya Ould Sid'Ahmed Taya. Despite this, the Mauritanian Government supported Iraq during the Gulf War. In 2003, several members of the party were jailed on suspicion of trying to overthrow the Government. The party was banned in 1999, following the restoration of bilateral relations with Israel. It was accused of developing plans in collaborations with the Iraqi government to foment a Coup within the country.

Mohamed Ould Abdellahi Ould Eyye, the party's leader, was arrested in 2003 following an anti-Government protest which demanded the Government to break its relations with Israel and the United States, and help Ba'athist Iraq. Ould Eyye, along with 13 other Ba'athists, was arrested by Government forces, and the party's headquarters were raided in May. Another pro-Iraqi Ba'ath party did take its place, the Party for Work and National Unity (French: Parti pour le Travail et l'Unité Nationale, abbreviated PTUN). However, while PTUN is close to the Iraqi Ba'ath branch, the group is small and largely inactive.

== See also ==
- Sawab
- Socialist Democratic Unionist Party
