= Salah Al-Mukhtar =

Iraqi politician (born 1944)

- صلاح المختار

Secretary General of the National Command of the Arab Socialist Ba'ath Party
- Incumbent
- Assumed office 3 November 2020
- Preceded by: Izzat Ibrahim al-Douri

Personal details
- Born: 1944 (age 81–82) Baghdad, Kingdom of Iraq
- Party: Iraqi Ba'ath
- Occupation: Politician, diplomat

Military service
- Allegiance: Iraq
- Branch/service: Iraqi Army
- Years of service: c. late 1970s - late 1980s
- Rank: Colonel

Salah Al-Mukhtar (Arabic: صلاح المختار; born 1944 in Baghdad) is an Iraqi Ba'athist politician who is reportedly the current leader of the Iraqi Ba'ath Party. He was Deputy General Secretary of the Arab League and Saddam Hussein's ambassador to many countries.

He served in the Iran-Iraq war within the Iraqi Army attaining the rank of Colonel.

He left Iraq for Yemen following the US invasion in 2003.

In 2007, he allegedly made a statement about how the coalition and Iran wanted to destroy Ba'athism and how it was the main reason for the war. He also condemned sectarianism in the war. He also claimed that the Ba'ath party was "the main fighting force" in the insurgency and how it was under different names for "camouflage".

He then went to Germany during the Arab Spring in 2011. Since 3 November 2020 he has been head of the Iraqi Ba'ath Party, reportedly succeeding Izzat al-Douri.
