= Coalition Provisional Authority Order 1 =

Order made by the Coalition Provisional Authority in Iraq

Coalition Provisional Authority Order 1: De-Ba'athification of Iraqi Society is the first of the 100 Orders imposed by the Coalition Provisional Authority during the Iraq War. Entering into force on 16 May 2003, it describes the objectives of the de-Ba'athification policy developed by the US Office of Special Plans.

== Details ==
The Order is justified in the preamble lines:

Recognizing that the Iraqi people have suffered large scale human rights abuses and depravations over many years at the hands of the Ba'ath Party,
Noting the grave concern of Iraqi society regarding the threat posed by the continuation of Ba'ath Party networks and personnel in the administration of Iraq, and the intimidation of the people of Iraq by Ba'ath Party officials,
Concerned by the continuing threat to the security of the Coalition Forces posed by the Iraqi Ba'ath Party,

Specifically, the order states that all members of the Ba'ath Party, from senior leadership to ‘Udw (Member) are "removed from their positions and banned from future employment in the public sector." The order demonstrates its broad sweep of society by stating:

Individuals holding positions in the top three layers of management in every national government ministry, affiliated corporations and other government institutions (e.g., universities and hospitals) shall be interviewed for possible affiliation with the Ba'ath Party, and subject to investigation for criminal conduct and risk to security.

The broad language of the order ensured that the broad approach favored by the Department of Defense would be the actual policy implemented under the CPA and delegated bodies. As a balance to the severity of the policy, the final clause of the Order states that the Administrator Paul Bremer can grant exceptions to the policy laid out in the Order.

== Order No. 1 Memorandum ==
Entering into force on 3 June 2003, the Memorandum entitled "Implementation of De-Ba'athification Order No. 1" describes the process by which the objectives described in Order No. 1 and Order No. 5 are to be carried out. The memo envisions a two phase process by which the policy is carried out. Initially, the Multi-National Force – Iraq ("Coalition Forces"), being the most capable institution in Iraq, were charged with ferreting out Ba'athists, and convening Accreditation Review Committees in order to fully investigate and vet possible party members. The second phase was contingent on the first phase’s success. In the second phase, enough Iraqi members of government have been deemed to not be affiliated with the Ba'ath Party and the Iraqi government is competent enough, the implementation of de-Ba'athification will go from being solely a CPA and Coalition Forces duty to the duty of the Iraqi government and the Iraqi De-Ba'athification Council, established by Order No. 5.

Section two of the memo describes the process of determining if individuals have party affiliations. The memo provides for investigators to be placed within government ministries to conduct investigations into individuals using:

i. Interviews with the individual (conducted by the investigators using the standardized form already developed);
ii. Public records and announcements documenting the ascension or promotion of party members;
iii. Judgments of CPA senior ministry advisors [sic];
iv. Testimony of Iraqis who have worked with the person in question;
v. Findings of the Iraqi de-Ba'athification Council described below (passed to the investigators through the Administrator);
vi. Assessment of leading Iraqi political figures; and
vii. Government records revealing bonuses or other privileges associated with being a party member.

Once the investigator determined an individual’s affiliation and deemed them subject to Order No. 1, they were to be informed of their right to appeal. If an exception was requested, then the investigator was to determine the eligibility of the individual and prepare a case if necessary.

The overall goal of the memorandum was to provide a structure for determining Ba'ath Party membership. Additionally, Iraqis were encouraged to be part of the de-Ba'athification process, and Coalition Forces initially charged with the policy were encouraged to consult with Iraqis. If an individual received an appeals hearing, he or she could avoid the punishments under Order No. 1 by proving the following:

i. Is willing to denounce the Ba'ath Party and his past association with it;
ii. Was a senior Ba'ath Party member or simply a ‘full’ party member;
iii. Has exceptional education qualifications;
iv. Left the Ba'ath Party before 16 April 2003 [the date the CPA officially dissolved the Ba'ath Party];
v. Continues to command the support of his colleagues and respect of their subordinates;
vi. Is judged to be indispensable to achieving important Coalition interests, at least in the immediate term;
vii. Can demonstrate that he joined the party to hold his job or support his family.

Such information was supposed to be considered in an individual’s appeal, but did not guarantee an exception, and the Administrator possessed the authority to overturn any ruling handed down by the Accreditation Review Committees.
