= Arab Liberation Front =

Arab Liberation Front جبهة التحرير العربية
- Leader: Rakad Salem
- Founded: 1969
- Headquarters: Ramallah, Palestine
- Newspaper: Sawt al-Jamahir
- Ideology: Ba'athism; Saddamism
- National affiliation: Palestine Liberation Organization
- International affiliation: Iraqi-led Ba'ath Party
- Colors: Black, Red, White and Green
- Palestinian Legislative Council: 0 / 132

Party flag

Arab Liberation Front (ALF; Arabic: جبهة التحرير العربية Jabhet Al-Tahrir Al-'Arabiyah) is a minor Palestinian political party, previously controlled by the Iraqi Ba'ath Party, which founded the ALF in 1969 as its Palestinian military wing. It was based out of Iraq and trained by the Iraqi army. The ALF was from its foundation a member of the Palestine Liberation Organization (PLO). Its membership was not limited to Palestinians, as its senior leadership roles included several Lebanese and Jordanian volunteers.

== History and background ==
The ALF was founded in April 1969, announced official in August 1969, as a front of the Iraqi-led faction of the Ba'ath Party, then led by Ahmed Hassan al-Bakr. The ALF has always followed Iraqi government policy on all matters. In line with the pan-Arab ideology of the Ba'ath Party, the ALF was initially opposed to "Palestinization" of the Israeli–Palestinian conflict, preferring to argue in terms of the wider Arab world's war with Israel, which it regarded as under the natural leadership of Iraq.

The ALF was the main group active in Iraq's small Palestinian population of approximately 34,000, but a very minor group in all other Palestinian communities. It has maintained a small following in the refugee camps of Lebanon, and has a minuscule presence in the Palestinian territories. Samir Sanunu is the representative of ALF in Lebanon.

The first leader of ALF was its secretary-general, Zeid Heidar. Heidar was born in Syria in the 1930s into a family of Arab nationalists. In 1956 he joined the Ba'ath Party in Syria. In 1968 he went to Iraq after the Iraqi Baath coup of 17 July 1968 and was a part of the Ba'ath Party in Iraq. In 1969, he was appointed by the government of Iraq secretary-general of the Ba'ath Party in Palestine, the ALF. In June 1969 the ALF became a member of the newly formed PLO, a device for Iraq to be able to influence the PLO and the events in Palestine. In 1974, the ALF joined the Rejectionist Front, initially strongly backed by Iraq, which was formed by hard-line Palestinian factions which rejected what they perceived as the increasing moderation of the PLO.

After the PLO entered into the Oslo Accords with Israel, the ALF opposed the accords, in line with Iraqi Ba'athist government policy. This brought about a split in the ALF in 1993, with a pro-Arafat Oslo faction becoming the Palestinian Arab Front and re-locating to the Palestinian territories; while the remainder of the ALF remaining in the Rejectionist Front.

The ALF gained some significance during the al-Aqsa Intifada, which started in 2000, as a distributor of financial contributions from the Iraqi government to families of "martyrs" with extra grants for the families of suicide bombers.

After the 2003 American invasion of Iraq, the fall of the Saddam Hussein's Ba'athist government, and dissolution of the Ba'ath Party, large numbers of the Palestinian refugees who had been living in Iraq were forced to flee Iraq, and many ALF members fled the country for security reasons for Lebanon and the West Bank.

== Leadership ==
Other leaders of ALF have included Munif al-Razzaz, Abd al-Wahhab al-Kayyali and Abdel-Rahim Ahmed. al-Kayyali became secretary-general in at least 1972–74, and served on the PLO Executive Council from January 1973. He was assassinated in Beirut in 1981 by unidentified gunmen. Ahmed was the secretary-general from 1975 (possibly 1974) until his death in 1991, and was a member of PLO Executive Council from 1977. The present secretary-general is Rakad Salem (Abu Mahmoud) who was held in Israeli jail between 2001 and 2006.

== Present situation ==
Today, the secretary-general of ALF continues to be Rakad Salem, who holds Iraqi citizenship. He was imprisoned by Israel in 2001 for distributing Iraqi funds to families of suicide bombers. He was one of 57 Palestinians released in 2006 as a goodwill gesture. The ALF continues to have a seat on the PLO Executive Committee, since 1993 held by Mahmoud Ismael. What the status and position of the ALF is since the 2003 end of Iraqi support is uncertain.

The headquarters of ALF are in Ramallah, West Bank. The ALF published a monthly newspaper, Sawt al-Jamahir (Arabic: Voice of the Masses), which was edited by Rakad Salem. The newspaper was financed by the Iraqi government until 2003, and it is uncertain whether the paper has continued to be published since then.

ALF has not been involved in armed attacks on Israel since at least the early 1990s, and it is no longer believed to possess any significant military capabilities.
