= Mauritanian Party for Renewal =

Political party in Mauritania

The Mauritanian Party for Renewal (French: Parti Mauritanien pour le Rénouveau, PMR) is a political party in Mauritania.

== History ==
The PMR was established in 1991 after the country's status as a one-party state was lifted. Unlike many opposition parties, it did not boycott the 1992 parliamentary elections. Although it received only 0.7% of the vote, it won a single seat. It lost its seat in the 1996 elections, which it did not contest.

The 2007 presidential elections saw the party nominate wealthy businessman Rajel dit Rachid Moustapha as its candidate, but he received only 0.27% of the vote. In the 2013 parliamentary elections the party received 0.7% of the vote, failing to win a seat.
