= Abdel-Rahim Ahmed =

Palestinian politician (1944–1991)

- Born: 1944; Haditha, Mandatory Palestine
- Died: 30 June 1991 (aged 46–47); Amman, Jordan
- Burial place: Amman, Jordan
- Education: Damascus University
- Years active: 1950s–1991
- Children: 4

Abdel-Rahim Ahmed (1944–1991) was a Palestinian politician who was one of the founders of the Arab Liberation Front (ALF). He served as a member of the Palestine Liberation Organization's (PLO) executive committee.

== Biography ==
Ahmed was born in a village, Haditha, Mandatory Palestine, in 1944. His family left the village and settled in Jordan after the Nakba in 1948. He was a graduate of Damascus University where he obtained a degree in agriculture.

Ahmed joined the military struggle against Israel when he was a teenager. He was a cofounder of the Baghdad-based ALF which was established in April 1969 and became part of the PLO in July that year. He was named as the general secretary of the ALF in 1975 which he held until his death in 1991. After his term the ALF experienced a significant division between pro-Iraqi and pro-Yasser Arafat groups. He was elected to the executive committee of the PLO.

Ahmed was married and had four children, three daughters and a son.

Ahmed died of brain and lung cancer at his home in Amman, Jordan, at age 47 on 30 June 1991. He was buried in Amman.
