= Sawt al-Jamahir =

Newspaper of the Arabic Liberation Front

Sawt al Jamahir صوت الجماهير
- Type: Monthly Newspaper
- Editor: Rakad Salem
- Language: Arabic

Sawt al Jamahir (Arabic صوت الجماهير meaning Voice of the Masses) was a monthly newspaper published by the Iraqi-controlled Arab Liberation Front (ALF), a small Ba'athist faction within the Palestine Liberation Organization (PLO). It was edited by the ALF's Secretary-General Rakad Salem and was widely believed to have been financially supported by the Iraqi government. Its fate became uncertain following the 2003 Iraq War and the subsequent fall of Saddam Hussein's regime.
