= 100 Orders =

Orders made by the Coalition Provisional Authority in Iraq

The 100 Orders are "binding instructions or directives to the Iraqi people that create penal consequences or have a direct bearing on the way Iraqis are regulated, including changes to Iraqi law" created in early 2004 by Paul Bremer under the Coalition Provisional Authority in Iraq. The orders called for the de-Baathification of Iraq as well as extensive economic changes. Most of the economic changes are focused on transitioning the economy of Iraq from a centrally planned economy to a market economy, as outlined in the contract by BearingPoint:

"It should be clearly understood that the efforts undertaken will be designed to establish the basic legal framework for a functioning market economy; taking appropriate advantage of the unique opportunity for rapid progress in this area presented by the current configuration of political circumstances... Reforms are envisioned in the areas of fiscal reform, financial sector reform, trade, legal and regulatory, and privatization."

== List of orders ==
- Coalition Provisional Authority Order 1: De-Ba'athification of Iraqi Society
- Coalition Provisional Authority Order 2: Dissolution of Entities
- Coalition Provisional Authority Order 3: Weapons Control – Bans possession of heavy weapons, and possession of small arms except at home or in a place of work; exceptions granted for Coalition personnel and for Iraqi police and soldiers; establishes weapons collection programme. CPA Memorandum 5 (1 September 2003) governs aspects of implementation.
- Coalition Provisional Authority Order 4: Management of Property and Assets of the Iraqi Baath Party (Rescinded per Order 100 Sec 4) (28 June 2004)
- Coalition Provisional Authority Order 5: Establishment of the Iraqi De-Baathification Council (Rescinded per Memo 7 Sec 3) (25 May 2003)
- Coalition Provisional Authority Order 6: Eviction of Persons Illegally Occupying Public Buildings (Rescinded per Order 100 Sec 4) (28 June 2004)
- Coalition Provisional Authority Order 7: Penal Code (10 June 2003)
- Coalition Provisional Authority Order 8: Traveling Abroad for Academic Purposes (7 June 2003) – removed all restrictions on foreign travel for students and academics (7 June 2003)
- Coalition Provisional Authority Order 9: Management and Use of Iraqi Public Property (Revised) (27 June 2004)
- Coalition Provisional Authority Order 10: Management of Detention and Prison Facilities (5 June 2003)
- Coalition Provisional Authority Order 11: Licensing Telecommunications Services and Equipment (Rescinded per Order 100 Sec 4) (28 June 2004)
- Coalition Provisional Authority Order 12: Trade Liberalization Policy (Annex) (Rescinded per Order 54 Sec 3 Para 4) (26 February 2004)
- Coalition Provisional Authority Order 13: The Central Criminal Court of Iraq (Revised)(Amended) (22 April 2004)
- Coalition Provisional Authority Order 14: Prohibited Media Activity (10 June 2003)
- Coalition Provisional Authority Order 15: Establishment of the Judicial Review Committee (23 June 2003)
- Coalition Provisional Authority Order 16: Temporary Control of Iraqi Borders, Ports and Airports (13 June 2004)
- Coalition Provisional Authority Order 17: Status of the Coalition Provisional Authority, MNF–Iraq, Certain Missions and Personnel in Iraq
- Coalition Provisional Authority Order 18: Measures to Ensure the Independence of the Central Bank of Iraq (7 July 2003)
- Coalition Provisional Authority Order 19: Freedom of Assembly (10 July 2003)
- Coalition Provisional Authority Order 20: Trade Bank of Iraq (17 July 2003)
- Coalition Provisional Authority Order 21: Interim Exercise of Baghdad Mayoral Authority (Rescinded per Order 100 Sec 4) (6 August 2003)
- Coalition Provisional Authority Order 22: Creation of a New Iraqi Army (Order 22, 7 August 2003)
- Coalition Provisional Authority Order 23: Creation of a New Code of Military Discipline for the New Iraqi Army, 23 August 2003, Annex A (7 September 2003)
- Coalition Provisional Authority Order 24: Ministry of Science and Technology (24 August 2003)
- Coalition Provisional Authority Order 25: Confiscation of Property Used In Or Resulting From Certain Crimes (3 September 2003)
- Coalition Provisional Authority Order 26: Creation of Department of Border Enforcement (1 September 2003). Section 1 calls for the establishment of the Department of Border Enforcement for Iraq as a department within the Ministry of the Interior to monitor and control the movement of persons and goods to, from, and across the borders of Iraq.
- Coalition Provisional Authority Order 27: Establishment of the Facilities Protection Service (7 September 2003)
- Coalition Provisional Authority Order 28: Establishment of the Iraqi Civil Defense Corps (9 September 2003)
- Coalition Provisional Authority Order 29: Amendment To Law of Estate Lease (7 September 2003)
- Coalition Provisional Authority Order 30: Reform of Salaries and Employment with Annex A (8 September 2003)
- Coalition Provisional Authority Order 31: Modifications of Penal Code and Criminal Proceedings Law (10 September 2003)
- Coalition Provisional Authority Order 32: Legal Department of the Ministry of Justice (4 September 2003)
- Coalition Provisional Authority Order 33: Ministry of Municipalities and Public Works (8 September 2003)
- Coalition Provisional Authority Order 34: Amendment To Coalition Provisional Authority Order Number 2 (13 September 2003)
- Coalition Provisional Authority Order 35: Re-Establishment of the Council of Judges (18 September 2003)
- Coalition Provisional Authority Order 36: Regulation of Oil Distribution (Annex A) (3 October 2003)
- Coalition Provisional Authority Order 37: Suspension of most taxes (including income tax and property rent tax) from April–December 2003 (21 September 2003).
- Coalition Provisional Authority Order 38: Reconstruction Levy (Amended per Order 70) (4 April 2004)
- Coalition Provisional Authority Order 39: Foreign Investment (Amended by Order 46) (20 December 2003) – liberalized trade [and proclaimed] "the independence of the central bank; set rules for the new currency and securities markets; declared policies for trademarks, patents, copyrights, public contracts, and debt resolution; and privatized state enterprises, thus establishing the basic conditions for the neoliberal political economy that the United States meant to launch in Iraq.
- Coalition Provisional Authority Order 40: Bank Law with Annex A (Rescinded per Order 94 Sec 3) (19 September 2003)
- Coalition Provisional Authority Order 41: Notification of Criminal Offenses (19 September 2003)
- Coalition Provisional Authority Order 42: Creation of the Defense Support Agency (23 September 2003) New body, under CPA control, to provide legal, medical, financial, logistical, recruitment, training and property management support to the Iraqi army
- Coalition Provisional Authority Order 43: New Iraqi Dinar Banknotes (14 October 2003)
- Coalition Provisional Authority Order 44: Establishment of The Ministry of Environment (14 November 2003)
- Coalition Provisional Authority Order 45: Non-Governmental Organizations (Amended per Order 61) (23 February 2004)
- Coalition Provisional Authority Order 46: Amendment of CPA Order 39 on Foreign Investment (20 December 2003)
- Coalition Provisional Authority Order 47: Amendment of CPA Order 38 on Reconstruction Levy (Rescinded per Order 70 Sec 2) (4 April 2004)
- Coalition Provisional Authority Order 48: Delegation of Authority Regarding Establishment of an Iraqi Special Tribunal with Appendix A (10 December 2003)
- Coalition Provisional Authority Order 49: Tax Strategy for 2004 with Annex A and Explanatory Notes (Amended per Order 84 Sec 3) (20 February 2004)
- Coalition Provisional Authority Order 50: Creation of Ministry of Displacement and Migration (11 January 2004)
- Coalition Provisional Authority Order 51: Suspension of Exclusive Agency Status of Iraqi State Company for Water Transportation (14 January 2004)
- Coalition Provisional Authority Order 52: Pensions for Judges and Prosecutors who die while holding Office (8 January 2004)
- Coalition Provisional Authority Order 53: Public Defender's Fees (18 January 2004)
- Coalition Provisional Authority Order 54: Trade Liberalization Policy 2004 with Annex A (Amended per Order 70) (4 April 2004)
- Coalition Provisional Authority Order 55: Delegation of Authority Regarding the Iraq Commission on Public Integrity (28 January 2004)
- Coalition Provisional Authority Order 56: Central Bank Law with Annex A (6 March 2004)
- Coalition Provisional Authority Order 57: Iraqi Inspectors General (10 February 2004)
- Coalition Provisional Authority Order 58: Maysan and Muthanna Courts of Appeal (10 February 2004)
- Coalition Provisional Authority Order 59: Protection and fair Incentives for Government Whistleblowers (1 June 2004)
- Coalition Provisional Authority Order 60: Establishment of the Ministry of Human Rights (22 February 2004)
- Coalition Provisional Authority Order 61: Amendment to Order 45 [Rescinded per Order 100 Sec 4] (28 June 2004)
- Coalition Provisional Authority Order 62: Disqualification From Public Office (Rescinded per Order 100 Sec 4) (28 June 2004)
- Coalition Provisional Authority Order 63: Public Sector Death and Disability Benefits (6 March 2004)
- Coalition Provisional Authority Order 64: Amendment to the Company Law No. (21 of 1997) with Annex A (5 March 2004)
- Coalition Provisional Authority Order 65: Iraqi Communications and Media Commission (20 March 2004)
- Coalition Provisional Authority Order 66: Iraq Public Service Broadcasting (20 March 2004)
- Coalition Provisional Authority Order 67: Ministry of Defense (21 March 2004)
- Coalition Provisional Authority Order 68: Ministerial Committee for National Security (4 April 2004)
- Coalition Provisional Authority Order 69: Delegation of Authority Regarding Establishment of the Iraqi National Intelligence Service (1 April 2004)
- Coalition Provisional Authority Order 69 Annex A: Order 69 Annex A (2 April 2004)
- Coalition Provisional Authority Order 70: Amendments to Reconstruction Levy (4 April 2004)
- Coalition Provisional Authority Order 71: Local Governmental Powers (Appendix not available) (6 April 2004)
- Coalition Provisional Authority Order 72: Iraqi Radioactive Source Regulatory Authority (15 June 2004)
- Coalition Provisional Authority Order 73: Transfer of the Iraqi Civil Defense Corps to the Ministry of Defence (25 April 2004)
- Coalition Provisional Authority Order 74: Interim Law on Securities Markets (19 April 2004)
- Coalition Provisional Authority Order 75: Realignment of Military Industrial Companies with Annex A (20 April 2004)
- Coalition Provisional Authority Order 76: Consolidations of State-Owned Enterprises with Annex A (28 May 2004)
- Coalition Provisional Authority Order 77: Board of Supreme Audit (25 April 2004)
- Coalition Provisional Authority Order 78: Facilitation of Court-Supervised Debt Resolution Procedures (20 April 2004)
- Coalition Provisional Authority Order 79: The Iraqi Nonproliferation Programs Foundation with Annex (19 June 2004)
- Coalition Provisional Authority Order 80: Amendment to the Trademarks and Descriptions Law No. (21 of 1957) (26 April 2004)
- Coalition Provisional Authority Order 81: Patent, Industrial Design, Undisclosed Information, Integrated Circuits and Plant Variety Law (26 April 2004) – According to Order 81, paragraph 66 – [B], issued by L. Paul Bremer [CFR], the people in Iraq are now prohibited from saving newly designed seeds (not the traditional ones) and may only plant seeds for their food from licensed, authorized U.S. distributors.
- Coalition Provisional Authority Order 82: Iraqi National Foundation for Remembrance (28 April 2004)
- Coalition Provisional Authority Order 83: Amendment to the Copyright Law (1 May 2004)
- Coalition Provisional Authority Order 84: Amendments to CPA Order No. 37 and CPA Order No. 49 (30 April 2004)
- Coalition Provisional Authority Order 86: Traffic Code with Annex A (20 May 2004)
- Coalition Provisional Authority Order 87: Public Contracts (16 May 2004)
- Coalition Provisional Authority Order 88: Rights of Judicial Officials to Return to the Judiciary After Certain Government Service (12 May 2004)
- Coalition Provisional Authority Order 89: Amendments to the Labor Code Law No. (71 of 1987) (30 May 2004)
- Coalition Provisional Authority Order 90: Special Task Force for Compensating Victims of the Previous Regime (29 May 2004)
- Coalition Provisional Authority Order 91: Regulation of Armed Forces and Militias within Iraq (7 June 2004) – Established a process to incorporate militias into the Iraqi Armed Forces and other Iraqi security forces (2 June 2004)
- Coalition Provisional Authority Order 92: The Independent Electoral Commission of Iraq (31 May 2004)
- Coalition Provisional Authority Order 93: Anti-Money Laundering Act of 2004 with Annex A (3 June 2004)
- Coalition Provisional Authority Order 94: Banking Law of 2004 with Annex A (7 June 2004)
- Coalition Provisional Authority Order 95: Financial Management Law and Public Debt Law with Annex A and B (4 June 2004)
- Coalition Provisional Authority Order 96: The Electoral Law (15 June 2004)
- Coalition Provisional Authority Order 97: Political Parties and Entities Law (15 June 2004)
- Coalition Provisional Authority Order 98: Iraqi Ombudsman for Penal and Detention Matters (27 June 2004)
- Coalition Provisional Authority Order 99: Joint Detainee Committee (27 June 2004)
- Coalition Provisional Authority Order 100: Transition of Laws, Regulations, Orders, and Directives Issued by the CPA (28 June 2004)
