= 1992 Mauritanian parliamentary election =

- 6 March 1992 (first round); 13 March 1992 (second round)
- All 79 seats in the National Assembly; 40 seats needed for a majority
- Turnout: 38.86%
| Party | Leader | Vote % | Seats |
|---|---|---|---|
| PRDS | Maaouya Ould Sid'Ahmed Taya | 67.67 | 67 |
| RDU | Ahmed Ould Sidi Baba | 7.37 | 1 |
| PMR | Mulay Ould Jiyed | 0.72 | 1 |
| Independents | – | 21.48 | 10 |
This lists parties that won seats. See the complete results below.
| Prime Minister before | Prime Minister-designate |
|---|---|
| Maaouya Ould Sid'Ahmed Taya; PRDS | Sidi Mohamed Ould Boubacar; PRDS |

Parliamentary elections were held in Mauritania on 6 March 1992, with a second round on 13 March. They were the first National Assembly elections after the constitutional referendum the previous year that resulted in the reintroduction of multi-party democracy. The result was a victory for the ruling Democratic and Social Republican Party, which won 67 of the 79 seats in the Assembly. Voter turnout was just 39%.

== Results ==
| Party or alliance | | Votes | % | Seats |
|---|---|---|---|---|
| Democratic and Social Republican Party | | 301,349 | 67.67 | 67 |
| RDU–PAGN | Rally for Democracy and Unity | 32,841 | 7.37 | 1 |
| RDU–PAGN | RDU–PAGN | 5,090 | 1.14 | 0 |
| RDU–PAGN | National Vanguard Party | 4,504 | 1.01 | 0 |
| RDU–PAGN | Total | 42,435 | 9.53 | 1 |
| PMR–C–UPC | Mauritanian Party for Renewal | 3,203 | 0.72 | 1 |
| PMR–C–UPC | Union for Planning and Construction | 382 | 0.09 | 0 |
| PMR–C–UPC | Mauritanian Centre Democracy Party | 357 | 0.08 | 0 |
| PMR–C–UPC | PMR–C–UPC | 319 | 0.07 | 0 |
| PMR–C–UPC | Total | 4,261 | 0.96 | 1 |
| Social and Democratic Popular Union | | 1,553 | 0.35 | 0 |
| Party of Work and National Unity | | 83 | 0.02 | 0 |
| Independents | | 95,644 | 21.48 | 10 |
| Total | | 445,325 | 100.00 | 79 |
| Valid votes | | 445,325 | 97.61 | |
| Invalid/blank votes | | 10,912 | 2.39 | |
| Total votes | | 456,237 | 100.00 | |
| Registered voters/turnout | | 1,174,087 | 38.86 | |
Source: Nohlen et al.
