= Presidency Council of Iraq =

Former transitional entity of Iraq

The Presidency Council of Iraq was an entity that operated under the auspices of the "transitional provisions" of the Constitution of Iraq and previously under the Transitional Administrative Law.

The Presidency Council functioned in the role of the president of Iraq until one successive presidential term after the ratification of the Constitution and a government was seated. The Presidency Council consisted of one president and two deputies, or vice-presidents, and the Presidency Council was to required to make all decisions unanimously.

The members of the Presidency Council were elected with "one list" by a two-thirds majority in the Iraqi Council of Representatives. The Presidency Council had the right to veto legislation passed by the Council of Representatives which may have overrode the veto with a three-fifths supermajority. Under the Transitional Administrative Law, the override required a two-thirds supermajority.

== History ==
The first Presidency Council was elected by the National Assembly on 6 April 2005, after more than two months of negotiations between the United Iraqi Alliance and Democratic Patriotic Alliance of Kurdistan political factions. Kurdish leader Jalal Talabani became president, with Shi'ite UIA and SCIRI member Adil Abdul al-Mahdi and outgoing Sunni president Ghazi al-Yawar as his deputies.

The second Presidency Council, the first under the new Constitution of Iraq, consisted of Talabani as president, and vice-presidents Adil Abdul al-Mahdi and Tariq al-Hashimi.

== See also ==
- President of Iraq
