= Feisal al-Istrabadi =

Iraqi lawyer and former diplomat

Feisal Amin Rasoul al-Istrabadi
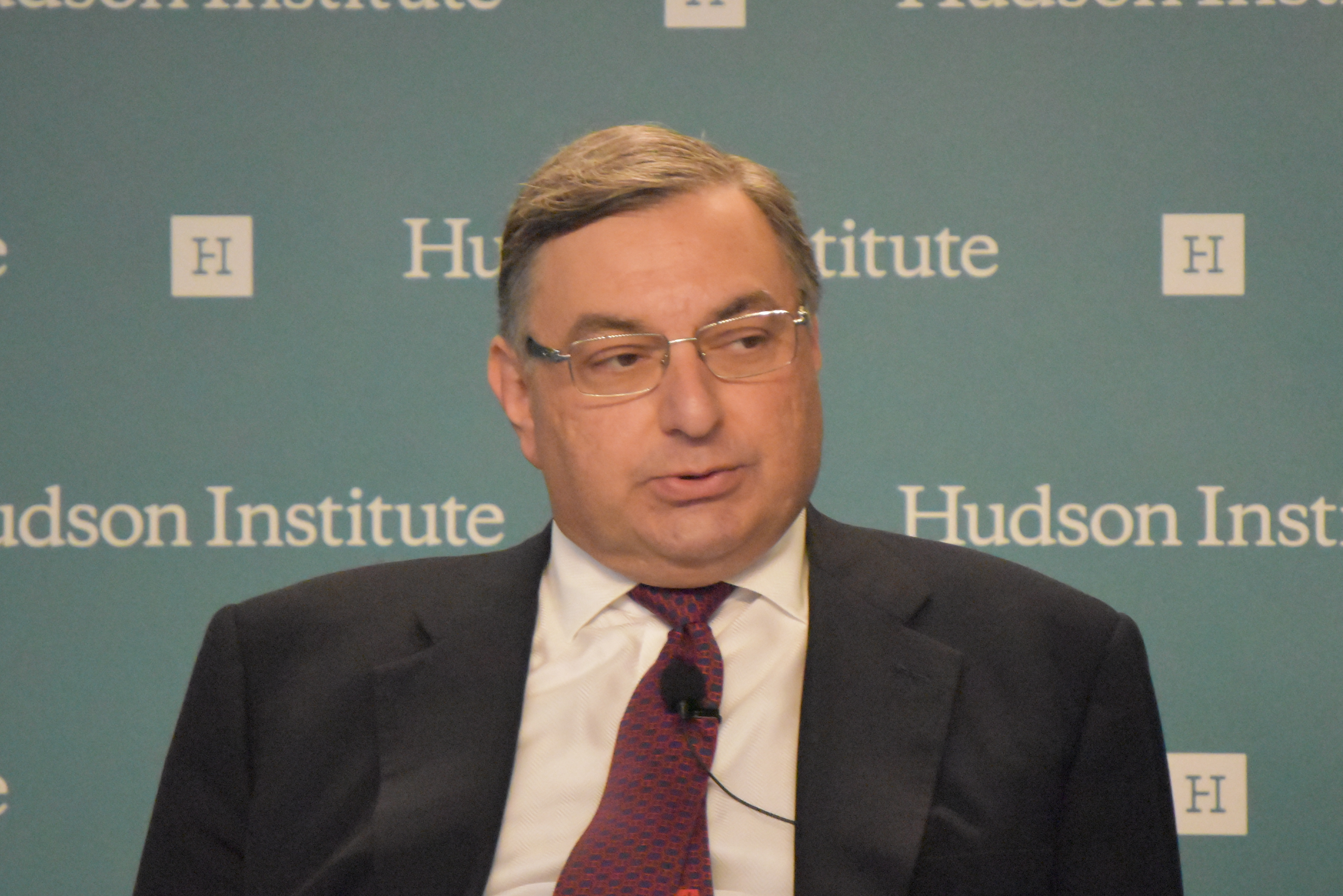

Ambassador Extraordinary and Plenipotentiary and Deputy Permanent Representative of Iraq to the United Nations
- In office 2004–2007

Personal details
- Born: February 11, 1962 (age 64) Virginia, U.S.
- Education: Indiana University

Ambassador Feisal Amin Rasoul al-Istrabadi
- Occupations: UN Diplomat, professor
- Years active: 2004–present

Feisal Amin al-Istrabadi (Arabic: فيصل امين الاسترابادي; born 1962) is an Iraqi lawyer and former diplomat who represented Iraq at the United Nations as ambassador and Deputy Permanent Representative from 2004 to 2007. In 2004, he was one of the main drafters of Iraq's Transitional Administrative Law (TAL).

He is also the founding director of the Center for the Study of the Middle East at Indiana University Bloomington.

== Background and early life ==
Al-Istrabadi was born in Virginia, in the United States of America, into a distinguished Iraqi family that had fled Iraq in the aftermath of the 1958 coup. That coup had removed the monarchy and imperiled those families that were intimately connected with it, including the al-Istrabadis.

Feisal's grandfather, al-Hajj Mahmoud al-Istrabadi, had been one of the drafters of Iraq's first constitution in 1925. His aunt, Lam'an Amin Zaki, had been in the delegation of women that went to Istanbul to seek the hand of the future wife of King Faisal II, who was later killed in the coup. During the coup, in July 1958, Feisal's grandmother Bibiya al-Istrabadi tried to smuggle Prime Minister Nuri al-Said to safety. She was killed in the attempt, along with al-Said, when they were discovered leaving Baghdad.

Soon after Feisal's birth, his family moved back to Baghdad, as the situation had calmed there. He spent his childhood in the Iraqi capital until 1970, when the aftermath of the Baath Party's coup two years previously forced his family to move again, this time to Bloomington, Indiana.

== Career ==
Al-Istrabadi received a doctorate in law in 1988 from Indiana University Bloomington and was a practicing trial lawyer for many years, during which time he became increasingly involved in Iraqi opposition politics. During this time, he developed close relationships with many of the figures who would go on to take posts in the new Iraqi government, but was concerned by the lack of unity and of political experience within the exile groups.

Persuaded of the urgent need to remove Saddam Hussein, both for his crimes of mass-murder and in order for sanctions to be lifted, Al-Istrabadi was a keen supporter of the military action to remove the Baathist regime in 2003. He was involved intimately with the drafting of the Future of Iraq Plan, a project sponsored by the State Department which exiled Iraqis developed as a blueprint for the best course of action after the war. This led al-Istrabadi and other exiles to expect an American force large enough to secure the country and an immediate transfer of sovereignty to Iraqis when hostilities ended. This contrasted with the eventual execution of the war, which involved a minimal troop presence and direct American rule over Iraq for a year by Paul Bremer.

=== Return to Iraq and government service ===
Al-Istrabadi returned to Iraq in 2003 as the legal advisor to Adnan Pachachi, Iraq's oldest and most experienced politician, who was later offered the Presidency but refused. As al-Pachachi's representative in the drafting committee of the Transitional Administrative Law (TAL), al-Istrabadi was one of the main Iraqi authors of the document, and was the primary author of the bill of rights.

Prior to his diplomatic appointment, Ambassador Istrabadi served as legal advisor to the Iraqi Minister for Foreign Affairs during the negotiations for U.N. Security Council resolution 1546 of 8 June 2004, which recognized the reassertion by Iraq of its sovereignty. In 2004, Al-Istrabadi was appointed Ambassador Extraordinary and Plenipotentiary, Deputy Permanent Representative of Iraq to the United Nations.

=== Academia ===
Beginning in the fall of 2007, Al-Istrabadi relocated to Bloomington, Indiana, where he began as a visiting professor at the Indiana University School of Law, also involved in teaching at the School of Public and Environmental Affairs. He earned an SJD degree from Northwestern University in 2009.

He is also an Associate Director of the Center for Constitutional Democracy at the Law School. In July 2010, Istrabadi became the founding director of Indiana University's Center for the Study of the Middle East. He is a member of the Crimes Against Humanity Initiative Advisory Council, a project of the Whitney R. Harris World Law Institute at Washington University School of Law in St. Louis to establish the world’s first treaty on the prevention and punishment of crimes against humanity.

== Publications ==
- Islam and the State in Iraq: The Post-2003 Constitutions, in: Rainer Grote and Tilmann Röder (eds.), Constitutionalism in Islamic Countries: Between Upheaval and Continuity (Oxford University Press, February 2011). ISBN 9780199759880.
- Rebuilding a Nation. Myths, Realities, and Solutions in Iraq, in: International Review (July 8, 2007)
- Democracy in Iraq, a paper written and submitted to the Senate Committee on Foreign Relations at the time of the Senate hearings on Iraq, July 31 and August 1.
