= Rakad Salem =

Palestinian politician

- ركاد سالم

Secretary-General of the Arab Liberation Front

Personal details
- Born: January 1, 1944 (age 82) Al-Kabri, Mandatory Palestine
- Citizenship: Palestine; Iraq
- Party: Arab Liberation Front
- Other political affiliations: Arab Socialist Ba'ath Party – Iraq Region
- Occupation: Journalist; Politician

Rakad Mahmoud Salameh Salem (Arabic: ركاد محمود سلامة سالم; kunya, Abu Mahmoud) is an Iraqi-Palestinian politician and longtime Secretary-General of the Arab Liberation Front (ALF), an Iraqi-controlled Ba'thist faction of the Palestine Liberation Organization (PLO). He was also editor-in-chief of the movement's monthly magazine, Sawt al-Jamahir (Arabic, Voice of the masses).

He lives in Bir Zeit in the West Bank, but was previously active in Lebanon during the Lebanese Civil War as commander of the ALF's military wing. He holds Iraqi citizenship. In 2001, he was arrested by Israeli forces on suspicion of having transferred money from the Iraqi government to families of Palestinian suicide bombers.
