= Transitional Administrative Law (Iraq) =

2004–2006 provisional constitution of Iraq

The Law of Administration for the State of Iraq for the Transitional Period (Arabic: قانون إدارة الدولة للفترة الانتقالية), also called the Transitional Administrative Law or TAL, was Iraq's provisional constitution following the 2003 Iraq War. It was signed on March 8, 2004 by the Iraqi Governing Council. It came into effect on June 28, 2004 following the official transfer of power from the Coalition Provisional Authority (a division of the United States Department of Defense) to a sovereign Iraqi government. The law remained in effect until the formation of the government in May 2006, when it was superseded by the permanent constitution that had been approved by referendum on October 15, 2005.

The TAL was principally drafted by a ten-man committee appointed by the Bush Administration with advice from the United States and United Nations personnel.

== Preamble and articles ==
The preamble begins:

The people of Iraq, striving to reclaim their freedom, which was usurped by the previous tyrannical regime, rejecting violence and coercion in all their forms, and particularly when used as instruments of governance, have determined that they shall hereafter remain a free people governed under the rule of law.

And contains further,

...affirming today their respect for international law, ... working to reclaim their legitimate place among nations,... have endeavored at the same time to preserve the unity of their homeland.

Article 2 provides for an Annex to this document, which was issued by the interim Governing Council on 1 June 2004, before the beginning of the transitional period. The Annex forms an integral part of this Law, and for the most part clarifies aspects of the transitional and interim administration.

== Rights ==
Supporters lauded the constitution's guarantees of "fundamental rights":

- equality before the law (Article 12), guaranteeing the equality of all without regard to "gender, sect, opinion, belief, nationality, religion, or origin";
- freedom of religion, though Islam is stated as the state's official religion and is to be considered a source of legislation;
- freedom of speech;
- freedom of the press;
- right to privacy;
- right to a "fair, speedy, and open trial" for all accused of crimes;
- no unlawful arrest or detention;
- torture and cruel and unusual punishment are banned "under all circumstances";
- right to private property is protected.

A lengthy provision emphasizes that police, investigators, or other governmental authorities may not violate the "sanctity of private residences."

Iraqis are also guaranteed the right to "education, health care, and social security." The right to possess, bear, buy, or sell arms is subject to "licensure issued in accordance with the law."

The right to citizenship is detailed and prominent within the chapter on fundamental rights. Eight provisions govern who is and isn't a citizen. Any Iraqi whose citizenship was withdrawn for political, religious, racial, or sectarian reasons has the right to reclaim his Iraqi citizenship, and each Iraqi is guaranteed the right to carry more than one citizenship. Revolutionary Command Council Decree 666, which in 1980 banned citizenship in Iraq for Ajam, Iraqis of Persian origin, is explicitly annulled.

Part of the Law of Administration's explicit rejection of Iraq's former racist policy (also explicitly referenced) is embodied in the wording "The federal system shall be based upon geographic and historical realities and the separation of powers, and not upon origin, race, ethnicity, nationality, or confession."

The Law stipulates that both Arabic and Kurdish be the official languages of Iraq.

== Political structure ==
The constitution provides for a transitional National Assembly, elected on January 30, 2005.

The government under the Transitional Law is a democratic republic, with three separate branches of government.

The elected National Assembly is a unicameral legislature with 275 elected members. Members selected a President of the Assembly, who serves as a non-voting speaker, and two deputies. The Assembly is the chief lawmaking organ, and is required to propose and pass bills in order to make law for the country.

The Assembly also elected a President of State who along with two deputies formed a Presidency Council to "represent the sovereignty of Iraq and oversee the higher affairs of the country." The council represents the executive branch of government and has the right to veto laws passed by the Assembly. The Assembly can then over-rule the Council with a two-thirds majority vote.

The Presidency Council appoints the Prime Minister of Iraq and cabinet (Council of Ministers of Iraq), all who must be approved by the Assembly. The Prime Minister and his cabinet exercise most of the day-to-day runnings of government, including control over the armed forces. The Assembly has a right to remove the Prime Minister with a vote of no confidence.

Federalism was also ordered to be implemented as well.

== Transitional period ==
The Transitional Administrative Law spelled out the steps to be taken after the transfer of sovereignty to the writing and enactment of a permanent constitution.

Article 2 stated that elections for the National Assembly should take place no later than January 31, 2005.

Article 61 stated that the Assembly should write a permanent constitution by no later than 15 August 2005. The draft permanent constitution would be presented in a referendum to the Iraqi people by 15 October 2005.

According to the TAL, the permanent constitution would be adopted if a majority of Iraqi voters approve it, and no more than 2/3 of the voters in any three governorates disapprove it. This provision was criticized by Ayatollah Al-Sistani on the grounds that it could lead to civil war if voters in the three majority Sunni Muslim governorates reject it.

Article 61 also provided for an extension to the constitution drafting process for up to six months. If the constitution were to be rejected or if the National Assembly failed to come to agreement, the National Assembly was to be dissolved and new elections were to be held.

== Judiciary ==
Local court justices are appointed by local governments and their "juridical councils", the Supreme Court being appointed by the Federal Government. The Supreme Court has nine members and possesses the ability to overturn legislation it finds unconstitutional.

The constitution also establishes several "National Commissions" to investigate and address recent concerns such as human rights and war crimes.

== Kurdistan and local government ==
The transitional constitution recognizes the current government of Iraqi Kurdistan as the legitimate government of the Kurds, and allows it to continue to exist within the new federal state.

Iraq elected Governors and Governorate councils for each of its 18 governorates, as well as elected mayors and city councils for each city. Elections were held at the same time as National Assembly elections.

== Role of Shariah ==
Shariah is addressed in two ways:

1. "Islam is the official religion of the State and is to be considered a source of legislation." But decisions according to Shariah may not abrogate articles or guarantees:
2. "Any legal provision that conflicts with this Law is null and void." Thus the Law of Administration circumscribes Shariah.

== De-Ba'athification ==
Former Ba'ath Party members who want to run for office are required to sign documents explicitly denouncing the party and denying they possess any continuing ties to the organization or its principles.

== Revenue from oil ==
The natural resources of Iraq are explicitly declared to belong to all the people of all the regions and governorates of Iraq. Their management is required to involve consultation with the governments of the regions and the administrations of the governorates. Revenue resulting from their sale through the national budget is required to be distributed in an equitable manner proportional to the distribution of population throughout the country, and with "due regard for areas that were unjustly deprived of these revenues by the previous regime."

== Enforcement of Coalition-created laws ==
Section A of Article 26 of the Law of Administration reads:

Except as otherwise provided in this Law, the laws in force in Iraq on 30 June 2004 shall remain in effect unless and until rescinded or amended by the Iraqi Transitional Government in accordance with this Law.

This appears to permit the Transitional Government to modify coalition legislation or parts of the Law of Administration "by a three-fourths majority of the members of the National Assembly and the unanimous approval of the Presidency Council". The Transitional Government, however, may not change the transitional period or remove human rights, nor may they delay the next elections by more than six months.

Significantly, the elected Transitional Government is not bound by the clause in the Annex to the Law of Administration which prevented the appointed Interim Government from "taking any actions affecting Iraq's destiny beyond the limited interim period".
