= Awards and decorations of the United States government =

Civilian awards of the U.S. federal government

Awards and decorations of the United States government are civilian awards of the U.S. federal government which are typically issued for sustained meritorious service, in a civilian capacity, while serving in the U.S. federal government. Certain U.S. government awards may also be issued to military personnel of the United States Armed Forces and be worn in conjunction with awards and decorations of the United States military. In order of precedence, those U.S. non-military awards and decorations authorized for wear are worn after U.S. military personal decorations and unit awards and before U.S. military campaign and service awards.

The following is a selection of civilian awards which are presently issued by the U.S. government.

== Office of the President of the United States ==
- Presidential Medal of Freedom with Distinction
- Presidential Medal of Freedom
- Presidential Citizens Medal
- Public Safety Officer Medal of Valor
- President's Award for Distinguished Federal Civilian Service
- National Medal of Arts
- National Humanities Medal
- National Medal of Science
- National Medal of Technology and Innovation
- Presidential Award for Excellence in Mathematics and Science Teaching
- Presidential Early Career Award for Scientists and Engineers (PECASE)
- Presidential Award for Leadership in Federal Energy Management
- Preserve America Presidential Award
- President's Environmental Youth Award
- President's Volunteer Service Award (PVSA)

=== Senior Executive Service ===
- Presidential Rank Award of Distinguished Executive
- Presidential Rank Award of Meritorious Executive
- Presidential Rank Award of Distinguished Senior Professional
- Presidential Rank Award of Meritorious Senior Professional

== United States Congress ==
- Congressional Gold Medal
- Congressional Silver Medal
- Congressional Bronze Medal
- Congressional Award Gold Medal (Youth Only)
- Congressional Award Silver Medal (Youth Only)
- Congressional Award Bronze Medal (Youth Only)
- Congressional Gold Certificate (Youth Only)
- Congressional Silver Certificate (Youth Only)
- Congressional Bronze Certificate (Youth Only)

== United States Intelligence Community ==
=== National Intelligence Community Awards ===
The National Intelligence Awards (NIA) Program is administered by the Office of the Director of National Intelligence for the United States Intelligence Community (IC).

==== Significant contribution awards ====
- George Washington Spymaster Award
- National Intelligence Cross
- National Intelligence Medal for Valor
- National Intelligence Distinguished Service Medal
- National Intelligence Superior Service Medal
- National Intelligence Exceptional Achievement Medal
- National Intelligence Meritorious Unit Citation
- National Intelligence Medallion
- National Intelligence Certificate of Distinction
- National Intelligence Special Act or Service Award
- Intelligence Community EEO and Diversity Exemplary Leadership Award
- Intelligence Community EEO and Diversity Outstanding Achievement Award
- Intelligence Community Seal Medallion
- Galileo Award

==== National Intelligence Public Service Awards ====
- National Intelligence Distinguished Public Service Medal
- National Intelligence Superior Public Service Medal

==== Special eligibility awards ====
- Intelligence Community Expeditionary Service Medal
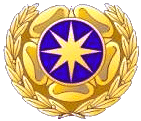
- National Intelligence Joint Duty Service Device
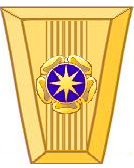
- Senior National Intelligence Service Device

==== Former award prior to establishment of the NIA Program ====
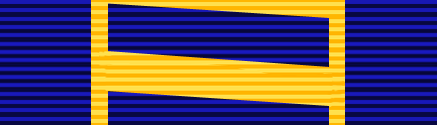
- National Security Medal
- National Intelligence Medal of Achievement (NIAM)

=== Central Intelligence Agency ===
==== CIA Awards ====
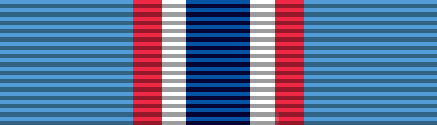
- Distinguished Intelligence Cross (Valor Award)
- Distinguished Intelligence Medal
- Intelligence Star (Valor Award)
- Intelligence Medal of Merit
- Distinguished Career Intelligence Medal
- Career Intelligence Medal
- Career Commendation Medal
- Intelligence Commendation Medal
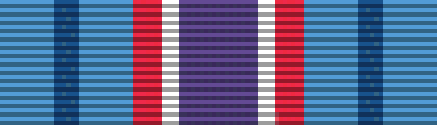
- Exceptional Service Medallion
- Hostile Action Service Medal
- Agency Seal Medal
- Director's Award
- Gold Retirement Medallion
- Silver Retirement Medallion
- Bronze Retirement Medallion

== Department of Agriculture ==
The USDA's Honor Awards is a tradition dating back to 1947 and represents the highest awards granted by the Secretary to an individual or group for contribution or achievement in support of the Department's mission. Since 2018, the traditional honor awards program has been redesigned into a three-tier structure:

- Tier 3: Secretary's Honor Awards
- Tier 2: Under (or Assistant) Secretary's Awards
- Tier 1: Administrator's (or Chief's) Awards

=== Animal and Plant Health Inspection Service ===
- Distinguished Honor Award
- Superior Honor Award
- Meritorious Honor Award

=== Foreign Agricultural Service ===
- Distinguished Honor Award
- Superior Honor Award
- Meritorious Honor Award

=== U.S. Forest Service ===
- Distinguished Science Award
- Early Career Scientist Award
- Science Delivery Award
- Strategic Goal Honor Awards
- Aldo Leopold Award for Overall Wilderness Stewardship Program
- Bob Marshall Award for Individual Champion of Wilderness Stewardship
- Bob Marshall Award for Group Champion of Wilderness Stewardship
- Wilderness Partnership Champion Award
- Excellence in Wilderness Stewardship Research Award
- Connie Myers Award for Leadership in Wilderness Education
- Line Officer Wilderness Leadership Award
- Outstanding Wild & Scenic River Stewardship
- Outstanding Wild & Scenic River Manager
- Outstanding Line Officer Leadership for Wild & Scenic Rivers

== Department of Commerce ==
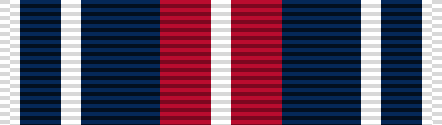
- Department of Commerce Gold Medal
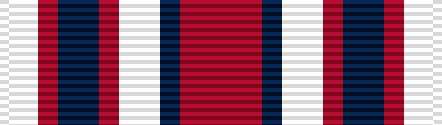
- Department of Commerce Silver Medal
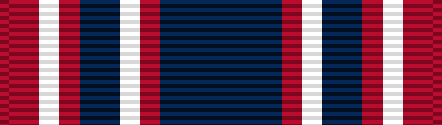
- Department of Commerce Bronze Medal
- President's "E" Award

=== National Institute of Standards and Technology ===
- Malcolm Baldrige National Quality Award
- Eugene Casson Crittenden Award
- Allen V. Astin Measurement Science Award
- Edward Uhler Condon Award
- Judson C. French Award
- Jacob Rabinow Applied Research Award
- Edward Bennett Rosa Award
- William P. Slichter Award
- Samuel Wesley Stratton Award
- George A. Uriano Award
- NIST Colleagues' Choice Award
- Director's Award for Excellence in Administration
- Equal Employment Opportunity/Diversity Award
- NIST Safety Award

=== National Oceanic and Atmospheric Administration ===
- NOAA Corps Meritorious Service Medal
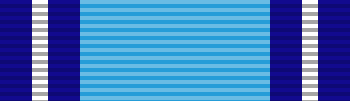
- NOAA Administrator's Award
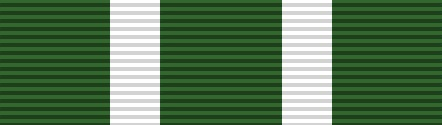
- NOAA Corps Commendation Medal
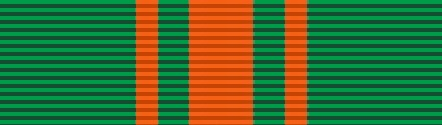
- NOAA Corps Achievement Medal
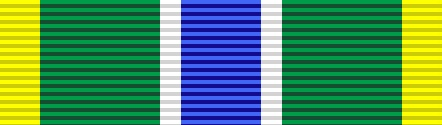
- NOAA Corps Director's Ribbon
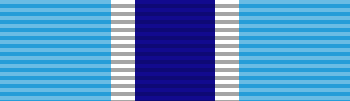
- NOAA Units Citation Award
- NOAA Technology Transfer Award
- NOAA Distinguished Career Award
- NOAA Meritorious Team Commendation

==== Non-government decorations ====
===== Non-governmental organizations =====
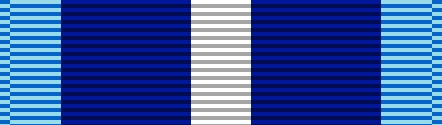
- Junior Officer of the Year = NOAA ACO Award Medal (without attachments)
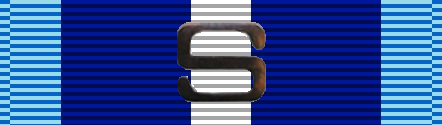
- Science Award = NOAA ACO Award Medal (with bronze "S" device)
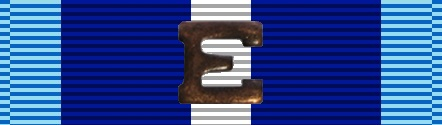
- Engineering Award = NOAA ACO Award Medal (with bronze "E" device)
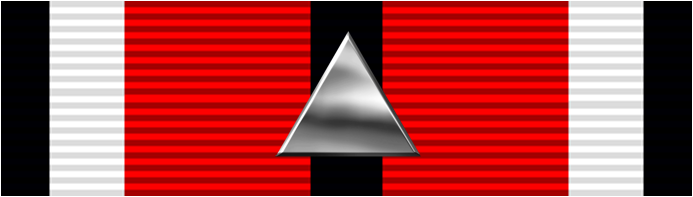
- Society of American Military Engineers' Colbert Medal
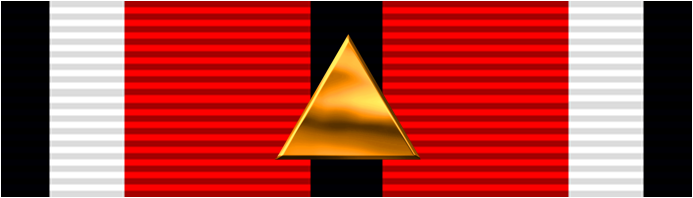
- Society of American Military Engineers Karo Award

==== Campaign and service awards ====
- NOAA Corps National Response Deployment Medal
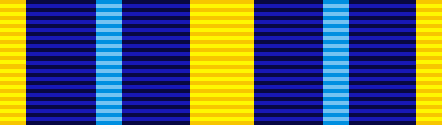
- NOAA Corps Outstanding Volunteer Service Award Medal
- NOAA Sea Service Deployment Ribbon
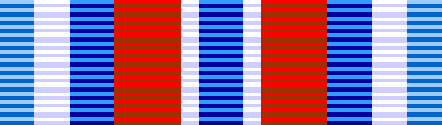
- NOAA Corps Atlantic Sea Service Ribbon
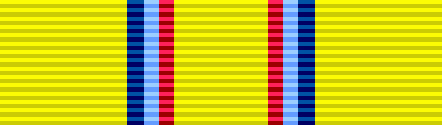
- NOAA Corps Pacific Sea Service Ribbon
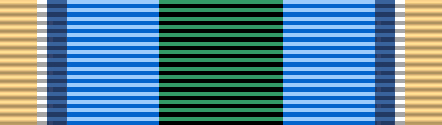
- NOAA Corps Mobile Duty Service Ribbon
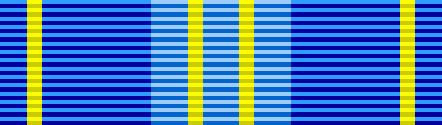
- NOAA Corps International Service Ribbon
- NOAA Corps National Response Service Ribbon

== Department of Defense ==
=== Department of Defense awards for civilian service ===
- Department of Defense Distinguished Civilian Service Award
- Secretary of Defense Meritorious Civilian Service Award
- Department of Defense David O. Cooke Excellence in Public Administration Award

=== Office of the Secretary of Defense-level awards for civilian service ===
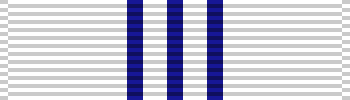
- Office of the Secretary of Defense Exceptional Civilian Service Award
- Office of the Secretary of Defense Civilian Career Service Award
- Office of the Secretary of Defense Medal for Valor
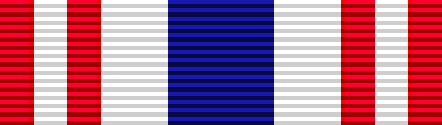
- Secretary of Defense Medal for the Defense of Freedom
- Civilian Desert Shield/Desert Storm Medal
- Secretary of Defense Medal for the Global War on Terrorism
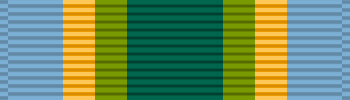
- Armed Forces Civilian Service Medal (AFCSM)
- Office of the Secretary of Defense Award for Excellence
- Office of the Secretary of Defense Group Achievement Award

=== Office of the Secretary of Defense-level awards for private citizens ===
- Department of Defense Medal for Distinguished Public Service
- Secretary of Defense Medal for Outstanding Public Service
- Secretary of Defense Medal for Exceptional Public Service
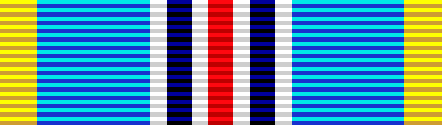
- Eugene G. Fubini Award

=== Joint Chiefs of Staff ===
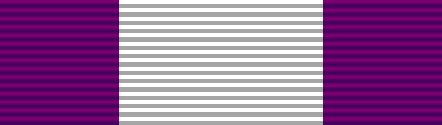
- CJCS Award for Distinguished Public Service (DPS)
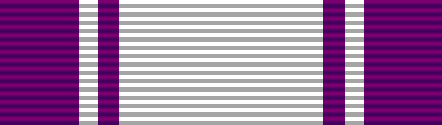
- CJCS Award for Outstanding Public Service (OPS)
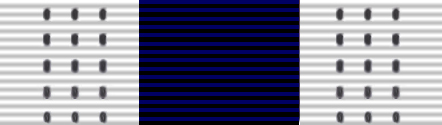
- CJCS Joint Distinguished Civilian Service Award (JDSCA)
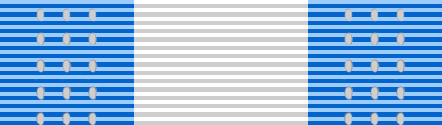
- CJCS Joint Meritorious Civilian Service Award (JMCSA), its military equivalent is the Defense Meritorious Service Medal
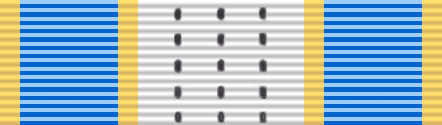
- Joint Civilian Service Commendation Award (JCSCA), its military equivalent is the Joint Service Commendation Medal
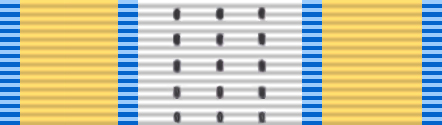
- Joint Civilian Service Achievement Award (JCSAA), its military equivalent is the Joint Service Achievement Medal

=== Civilian Personnel Management Service ===
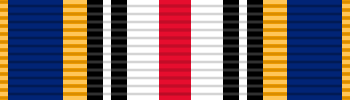
- Exceptional Civilian Service Award
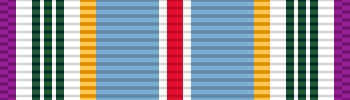
- Meritorious Civilian Service Award
- Outstanding Civilian Career Service Award

=== Defense Acquisition University ===
- Defense Acquisition University President's Medal
- Defense Acquisition University Superior Civilian Service Medal
- Defense Acquisition University Civilian Achievement Medal

=== Defense Advanced Research Projects Agency ===
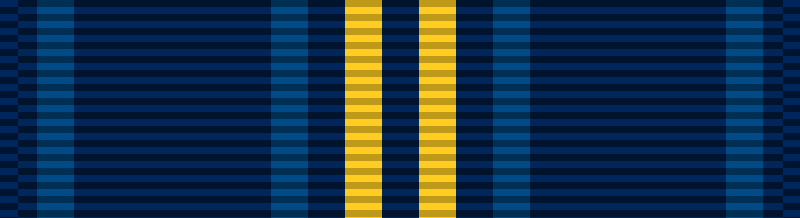
- DARPA Distinguished Civilian Service Medal
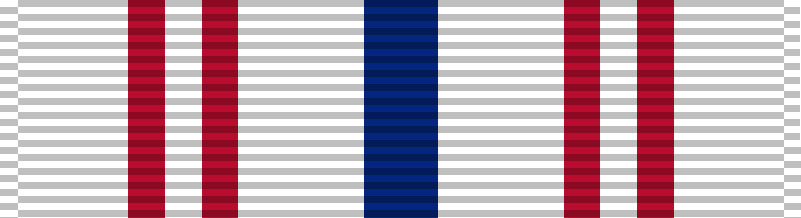
- DARPA Superior Civilian Service Medal
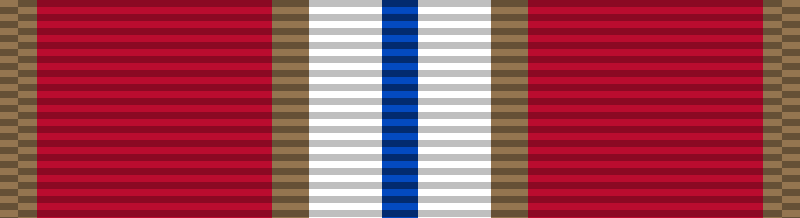
- DARPA Meritorious Civilian Service Medal
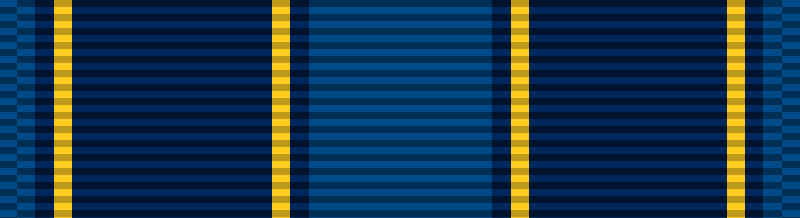
- DARPA Distinguished Public Service Medal
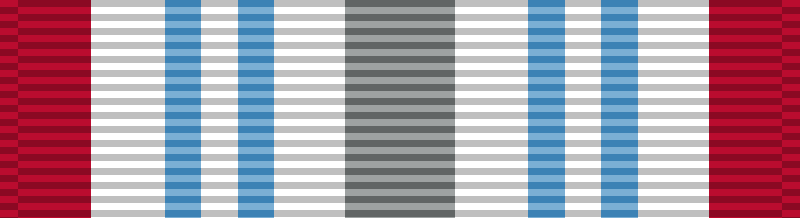
- DARPA Superior Public Service Medal
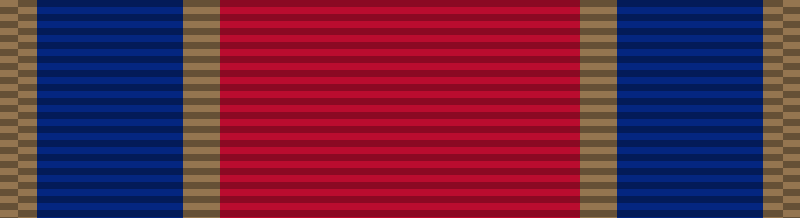
- DARPA Meritorious Public Service Medal
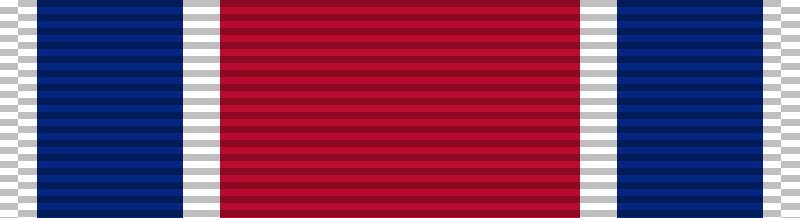
- DARPA Honorable Service Medal
- Game Changer Award Medallion

=== DOD Office of the Inspector General (OIG) ===
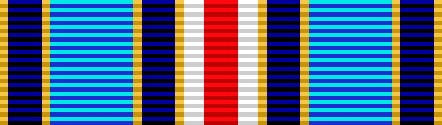
- DOD Inspector General Distinguished Service Award
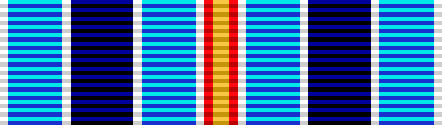
- DOD Inspector General Superior Civilian Service Award
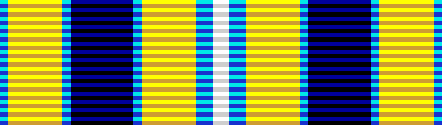
- DOD Inspector General Meritorious Civilian Service Award

=== Defense Investigative Service ===
- Defense Investigative Service Exceptional Civilian Service Award
- Defense Investigative Service Meritorious Civilian Service Award

=== Defense POW/MIA Accounting Agency ===
- Director's Meritorious Civilian Service Award
- Director's Commendation for Civilian Service
- Director's Civilian Achievement Award
- DPAA Operational Team Service Medal
- DPAA Distinguished Public Service Medal
- DPAA Superior Public Service Medal

=== Department of the Army ===
==== Department of the Army Civilian Service Decorations ====
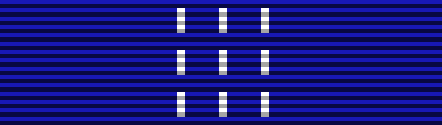
- Department of the Army Distinguished Civilian Service Award
- Secretary of the Army Award for Valor
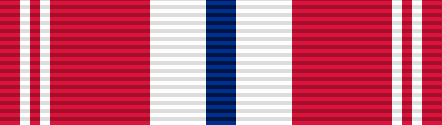
- Superior Civilian Service Award
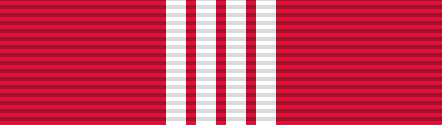
- Meritorious Civilian Service Award
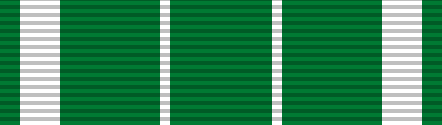
- Department of the Army Civilian Service Commendation Medal (formerly the Commander's Award for Civilian Service)
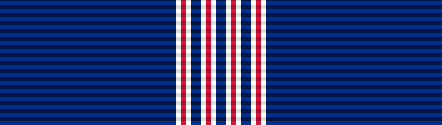
- Department of the Army Civilian Service Achievement Medal
- Secretary of the Army's Award for Outstanding Achievement in Materiel Acquisition

==== Department of the Army Civilian Service Medals ====
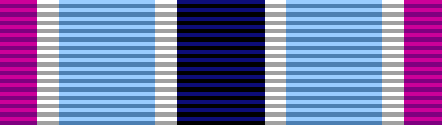
- Civilian Award for Humanitarian Service
- Secretary of Defense Medal for the Global War on Terrorism
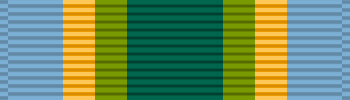
- Armed Forces Civilian Service Medal (AFCSM)

==== Department of the Army Public Service Decorations ====
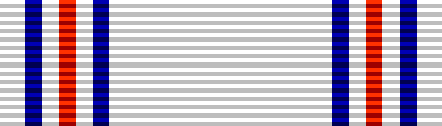
- Distinguished Public Service Medal
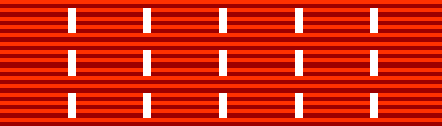
- Superior Public Service Medal
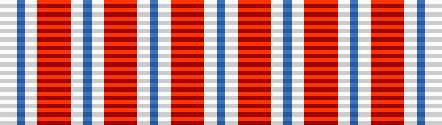
- Meritorious Public Service Medal
- Public Service Commendation Medal (formerly the Commander's Award for Public Service)
- Patriotic Public Service Lapel Button
- Certificate of Appreciation for Patriotic Civilian Service

=== Department of the Air Force ===
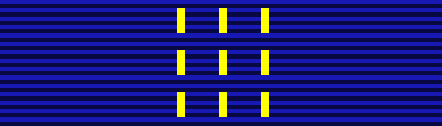
- Air Force Decoration for Exceptional Civilian Service
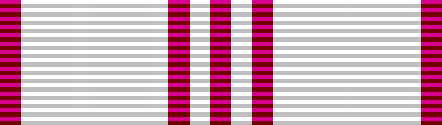
- Outstanding Civilian Career Service Award
- Civilian Award for Valor
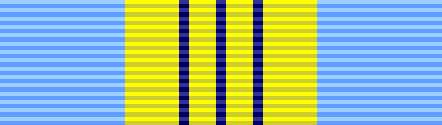
- Meritorious Civilian Service Award
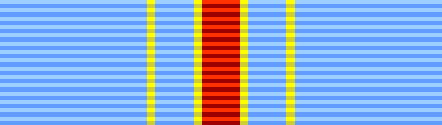
- Command Civilian Award for Valor
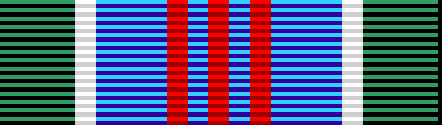
- Exemplary Civilian Service Award
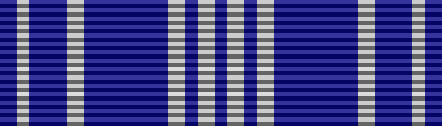
- Civilian Achievement Award
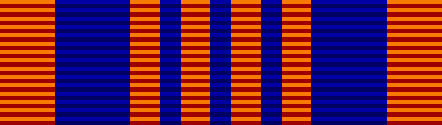
- Civilian Air Medal (proposed by Gen. McPeak in 1993, but not instituted)
- Civilian Aerial Achievement Award (proposed by Gen. McPeak in 1993, but not instituted)

==== Awards for non-governmental personnel ====
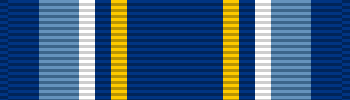
- Secretary of the Air Force Distinguished Public Service Award
- Chief of Staff of the Air Force Award for Exceptional Public Service
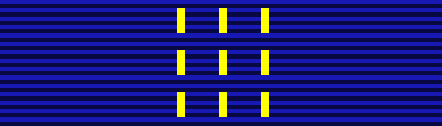
- Air Force Exceptional Service Award
- Air Force Scroll of Appreciation
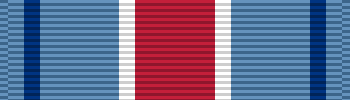
- Commander's Public Service Award

=== Department of the Navy ===
- Distinguished Civilian Service Award
- Superior Civilian Service Award
- Meritorious Civilian Service Award
- Civilian Service Commendation Medal
- Civilian Service Achievement Medal
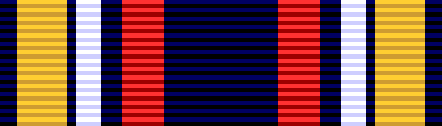
- Distinguished Civilian Medal for Valor
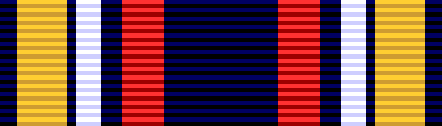
- Superior Civilian Medal for Valor
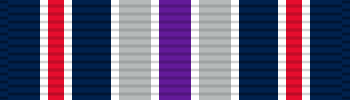
- Angela M. Houtz Medal for Fallen Civilians
- Captain Robert Dexter Conrad Award for Scientific Achievement
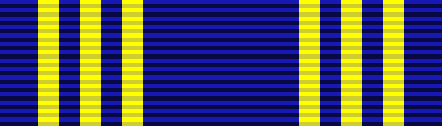
- Distinguished Achievement in Science Award
- Distinguished Public Service Award
- Superior Public Service Award
- Meritorious Public Service Award

==== Military Sealift Command ====
- Military Sealift Command Civilian Service Commendation Medal
- Military Sealift Command Civilian Service Achievement Medal
- Military Sealift Command Civilian Humanitarian Service Medal

=== Defense Commissary Agency ===
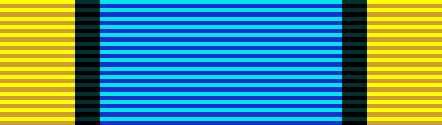
- DeCA Distinguished Civilian Service Award
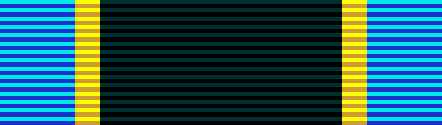
- DeCA Meritorious Civilian Service Award
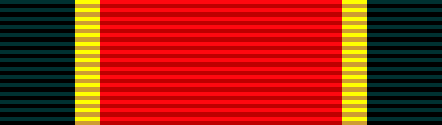
- DeCA Superior Civilian Service Award
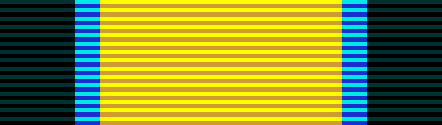
- DeCA Civilian Career Service Award

=== Defense Contract Audit Agency ===
- Distinguished Civilian Service Medal
- Meritorious Civilian Service Medal

=== Defense Contract Management Agency (DCMA) ===
- DCMA Distinguished Civilian Service Award
- DCMA Exceptional Civilian Service Award
- DCMA Meritorious Civilian Service Award
- DCMA Civilian Career Service Award

=== Defense Information Systems Agency ===
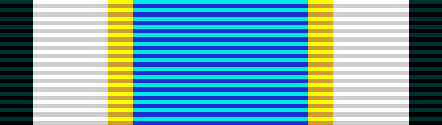
- DISA Exceptional Civilian Service Medal
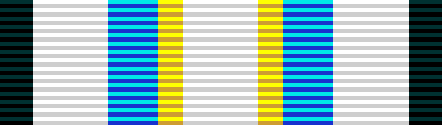
- DISA Meritorious Civilian Service Medal

=== Defense Intelligence Agency ===
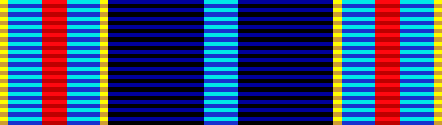
- DIA Leadership Award
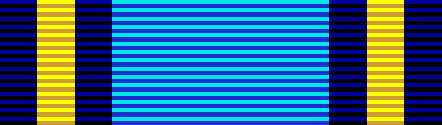
- DIA Exceptional Civilian Service Medal
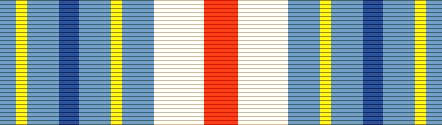
- DIA Excellent Service Medal
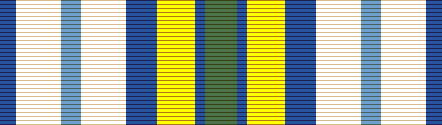
- DIA Civilian Achievement Medal
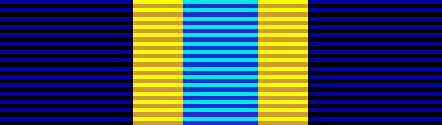
- DIA Meritorious Civilian Service Medal
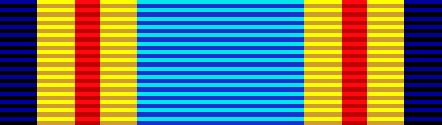
- DIA Director's Award
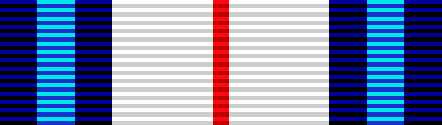
- DIA Civilian Combat Support Medal
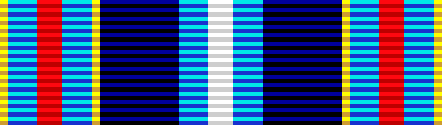
- DIA Civilian Expeditionary Medal

=== Defense Logistics Agency ===
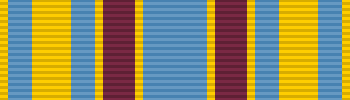
- DLA Distinguished Career Service Award
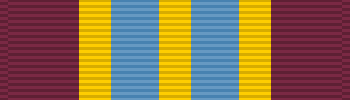
- DLA Meritorious Civilian Service Award
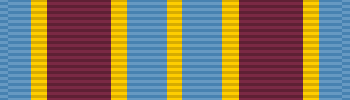
- DLA Superior Civilian Service Award
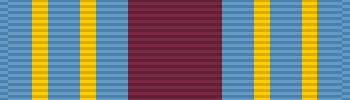
- DLA Exceptional Civilian Service Award
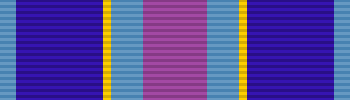
- DLA Humanitarian Service Medal

=== Defense Supply Agency ===
DSA Exceptional Civilian Service Award

=== Defense Technical Information Center ===
- DTIC Exceptional Civilian Service Award
- DTIC Meritorious Civilian Service Award

=== Defense Threat Reduction Agency (DTRA) ===
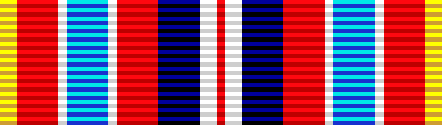
- DTRA Distinguished Service Award
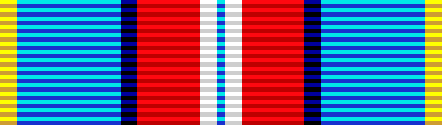
- DTRA Meritorious Service Award
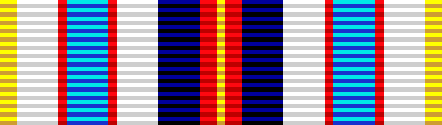
- DTRA Exceptional Service Award
- DTRA Honorable Civilian Service Medal

==== Formerly the Defense Special Weapons Agency (DSWA) Awards ====
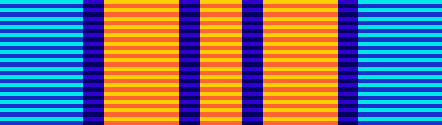
- DSWA Director's Lifetime Achievement Award
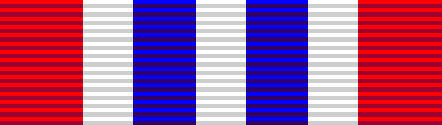
- DSWA Exceptional Civilian Service Award
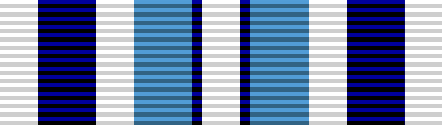
- DSWA Meritorious Civilian Service Award

=== National Geospatial-Intelligence Agency ===
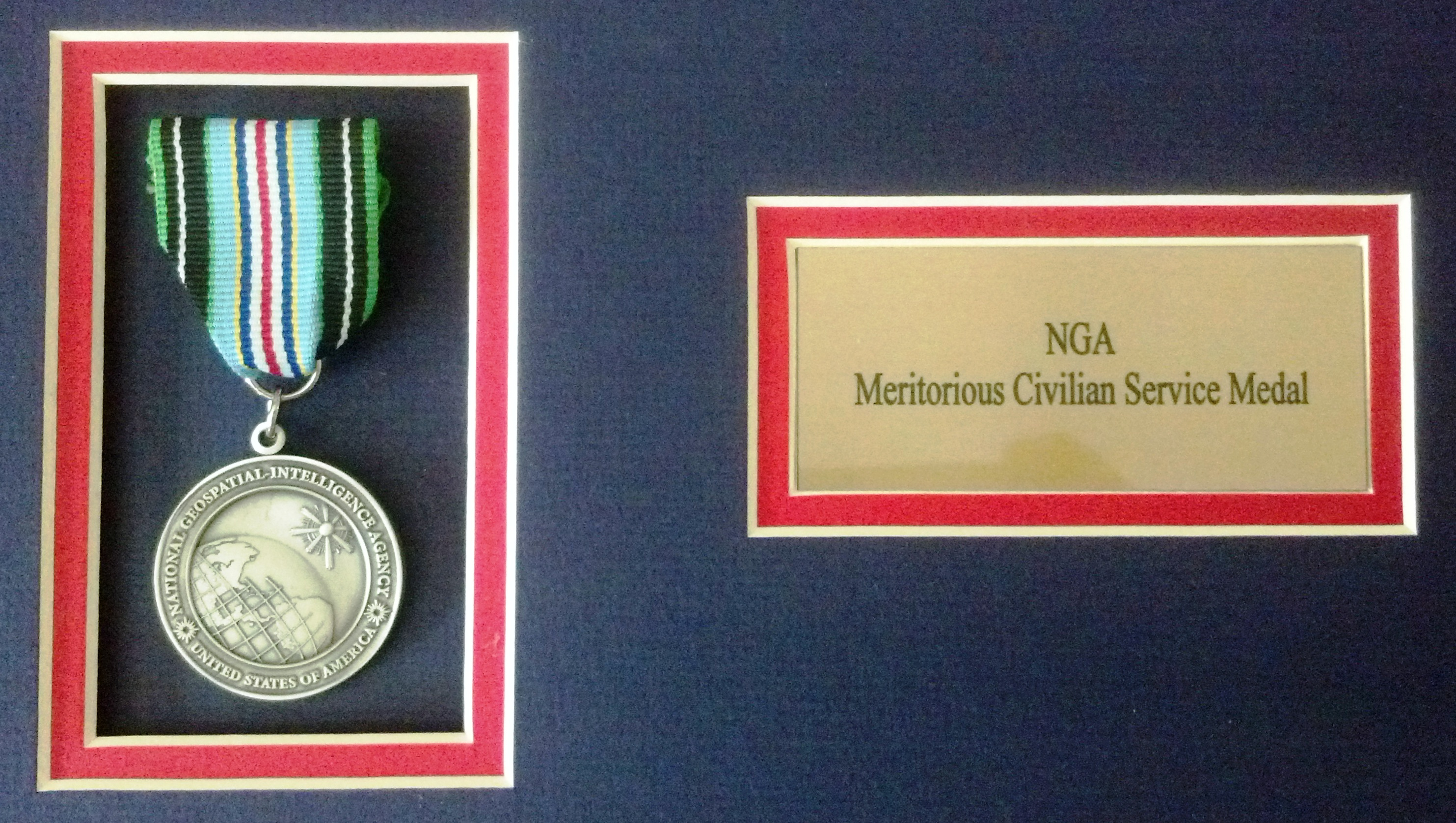
NGA's Meritorious Civilian Service Medal as awarded to honorees.

- NIMA or NGA Distinguished Civilian Service Medal
- NIMA or NGA Meritorious Civilian Service Medal
- NIMA or NGA Superior Civilian Service Medal
- NIMA or NGA Meritorious Unit Citation

=== National Reconnaissance Office ===
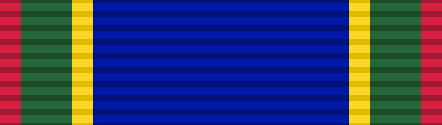
- NRO Distinguished Service Medal (Gold Medal)
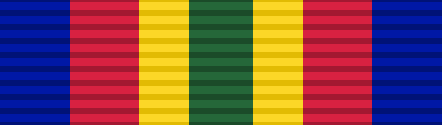
- NRO Superior Service Medal (Silver Medal)
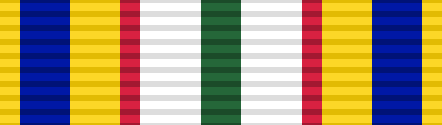
- NRO Meritorious Service Medal (Bronze Medal)
- NRO Director's Circle Award

=== National Security Agency ===
- NSA Distinguished Civilian Service Medal
- NSA Superior Civilian Service Medal
- NSA Meritorious Civilian Service Medal
- NSA Civilian Service Achievement Medal
- NSA Civilian Valor Medal
- NSA Leadership Medallion
- NSA Innovation Medallion
- NSA National Security Medallion
- NSA Citizenship Medallion
- NSA Foreign Partnership Medallion
- NSA Public Service Medallion
- Frank Byron Rowlett Award
- NSA Exceptional Civilian Service Medal (no longer awarded)

=== Uniformed Services University of the Health Sciences ===
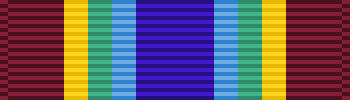
- USUHS Distinguished Service Medal
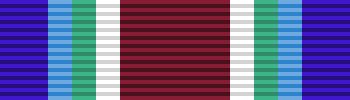
- USUHS Exceptional Service Medal
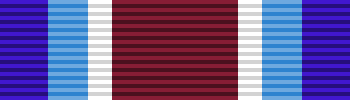
- USUHS Outstanding Service Medal
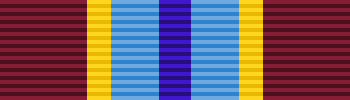
- USUHS Commendable Service Medal
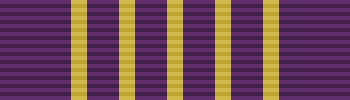
- USUHS Medal of Achievement

== Department of Education ==
=== Employee awards ===
- Secretary's Golden Apple Award
- Secretary's Executive Leadership Award
- Secretary's Supervisory Leadership Award
- Secretary's Innovation Award
- Secretary's Customer Service Award
- Secretary's Teamwork Award
- Secretary's Diversity and Inclusion Award
- Secretary's Collaboration Award
- ED Peer Recognition Award
- James P. Keenan Award

=== Public awards ===
Insignia that designates a Blue Ribbon School.

- Presidential Scholar Medallion
- President's Education Awards Program (PEAP)
- PEAP—Excellence Award for Elementary Schools (with Certificate and Gold Seal in Blue Pin)
- PEAP—Excellence Award for Middle Schools (with Certificate and Gold Seal in Red Pin)
- PEAP—Excellence Award for High Schools (with Certificate and Gold Seal in Black Pin)
- PEAP—Achievement Award for Elementary, Middle and High Schools (with Certificate and Silver Seal in White Pin)
- National Blue Ribbon Schools Program
- National Green Ribbon Schools Program

== Department of Energy ==

=== Honor awards ===
- The James R. Schlesinger Award
- Secretary of Energy's Excellence Award
- Secretary of Energy's Achievement Award

=== Appreciation awards ===
- Secretary of Energy's Appreciation Award
- Secretary of Energy's Appreciation Award for Management Excellence

=== Departure awards ===
- Secretary of Energy's Exceptional Service Award
- Secretary of Energy's Distinguished Service Award
- Secretary of Energy's Meritorious Service Award

=== Departmental awards ===
- Safety System Oversight (SSO) Annual Award
- Facility Representative of the Year Award
- Locally Employed Staff (LES)/Foreign Service National (FSN) of the Year Award

=== Inactive and obsolete awards ===
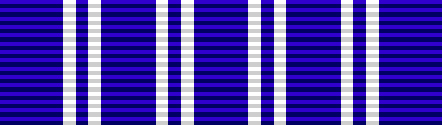
- DOE Award for Valor
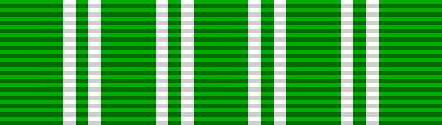
- DOE Secretary's Award
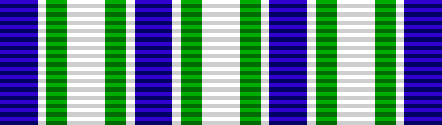
- DOE Exceptional Service Medal
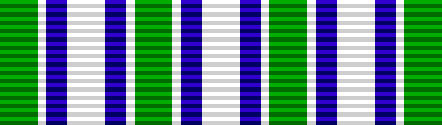
- DOE Meritorious Service Award

== Department of Health and Human Services ==
- Secretary's Award for Distinguished Service
- Secretary's Award for Meritorious Service
- HHS Distinguished Public Service Award
- HHS Award for Excellence in Management
- Hubert H. Humphrey Award for Service to America
- HHS Career Achievement Award
- Secretary's Recognition Award
- Secretary's Special Citation
- Secretary's Certificate of Appreciation
- Secretary's Letter of Appreciation
- Superior Accomplishment Award - Special Act or Service
- Superior Accomplishment Award - Suggestions
- Superior Accomplishment Award - Inventions

=== U.S. Public Health Service ===
For authorized uniformed service awards of the U.S. Public Health Service Commissioned Corps, visit “Awards and decorations of the Public Health Service"

- Assistant Secretary for Health's Exceptional Service Medal (can be awarded to a member of any uniformed service or a civilian)
- Surgeon General's Medallion (can be awarded to a member of any uniformed service or a civilian)
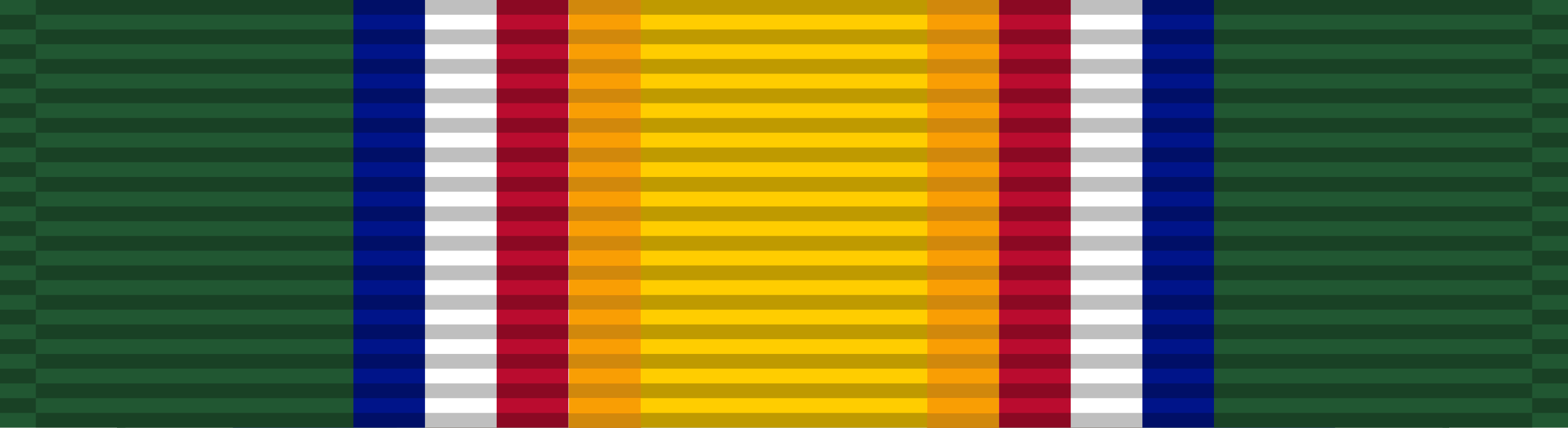
- Public Health Service COVID-19 Pandemic Civilian Service Award Medal

==== National Institutes of Health ====
- NIH Director's Award – Scientific/Medical
- NIH Director's Award – Technical/Clerical/Support
- NIH Director's Award – Administrative
- NIH Director's Award – Mentoring

==== Office of the Assistant Secretary for Preparedness and Response ====
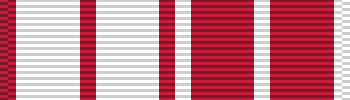
- D.A. Henderson Lifetime Achievement Medal
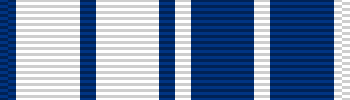
- Investor in People Leadership Award Medal
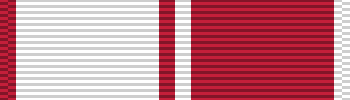
- Pinnacle Award Medal
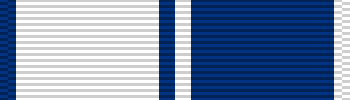
- Superior Contribution Medal
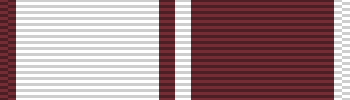
- Pledge to Excellence Medal

==== Centers for Disease Control and Prevention (CDC) / Agency for Toxic Substances and Disease Registry (ATSDR) ====
CDC/ATSDR William Watson Medal of Excellence (no ribbon)

== Department of Homeland Security ==
- Homeland Security Distinguished Service Medal
- Homeland Security Distinguished Public Service Medal
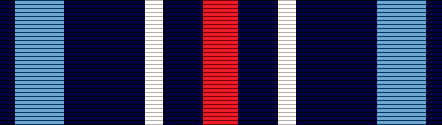
- Secretary's Exceptional Service Gold Medal
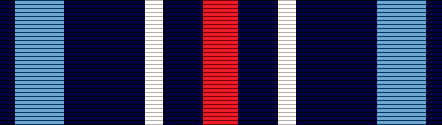
- Secretary's Meritorious Service Silver Medal
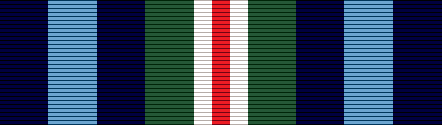
- Civilian Outstanding Service Award
- Secretary's Award for Leadership Excellence
- Secretary's Award for Valor
- Secretary's Unity of Effort Award
- Secretary's Award for Exemplary Service
- Secretary's Award for Excellence
- Secretary's Unit Award
- Secretary's Award for Diversity Management
- Secretary's Award for Volunteer Service
- DHS Outstanding Unit Award

=== U.S. Customs and Border Protection ===
==== Border Patrol ====
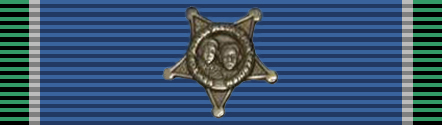
- Border Patrol Newton–Azrak Award
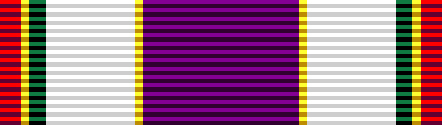
- Border Patrol Purple Cross
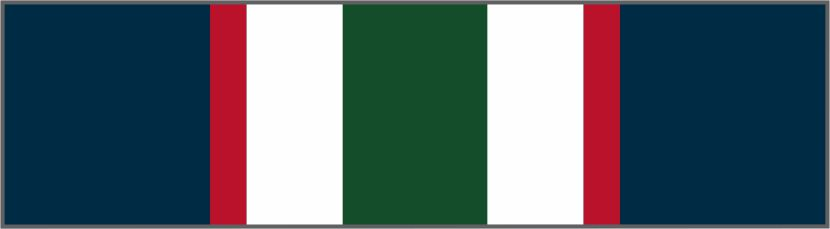
- USBP Commendation Medal
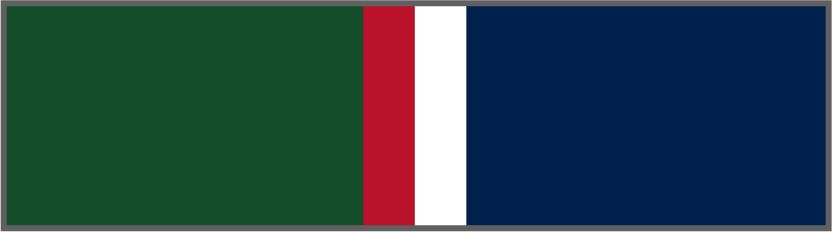
- USBP Achievement Medal
- USBP 75th Anniversary Commemorative Medal
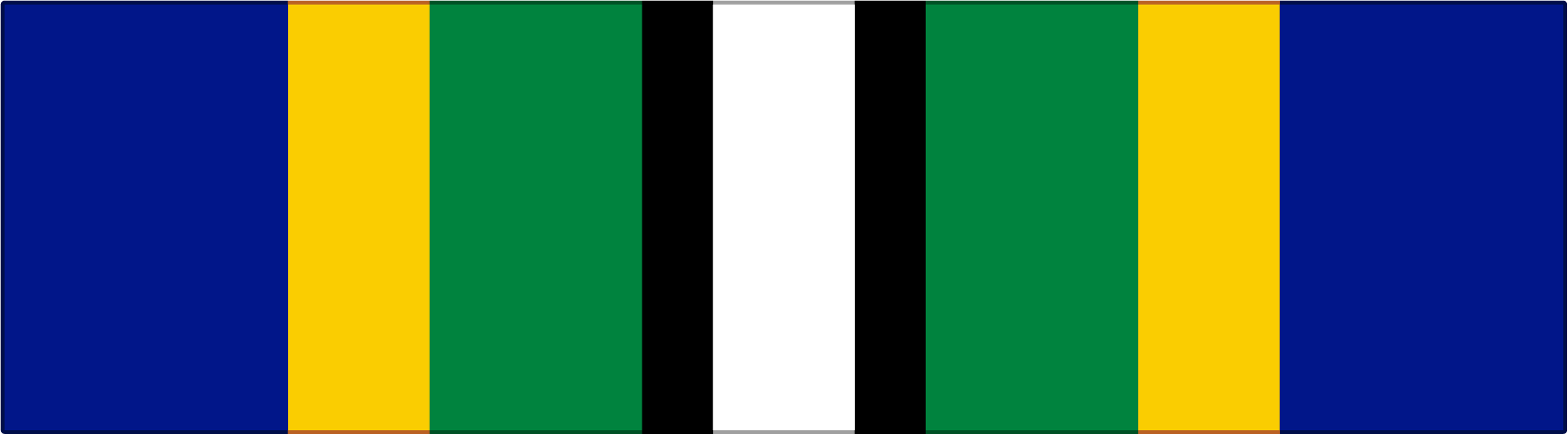
- USBP 100th Anniversary Commemorative Medal
- USBP Employee of the Year
- USBP Station of the Year
- USBP Sector Employee of the Year
- USBP Section Station of the Year
- Awards no longer issued since 2023:
- Medal of Honor for Heroism Award
- Meritorious Service Award for Valor
- Commissioner's Leadership Award
- Commissioner's Invictus Award
- Commissioner's Integrity Award
- Commissioner's Blue Eagle Award
- CBP Community Service Award
- Commissioner's Unit Citation Award

=== Federal Emergency Management Agency ===
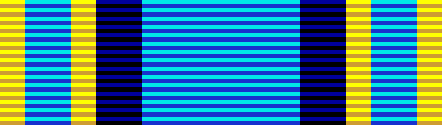
- FEMA Distinguished Service Medal
- Secretary's Award For Distinguished Public Safety Service (may be awarded by the Attorney General or FEMA Director)

=== Federal Law Enforcement Training Centers ===
- FLETC Honor Graduate of the Year Award
- FLETC Director's Life Saving Award
- Federal Law Enforcement Training Accreditation (FLETA) Team Leader Recognition Award
- FLETA Agency Leadership Recognition Award

=== U.S. Coast Guard ===
For authorized military awards, visit "Awards and decorations of the United States Coast Guard"

- Gold Lifesaving Medal
- Silver Lifesaving Medal

==== Civilian Service Awards ====
- Commandant's Superior Achievement Award
- Commandant's Distinguished Career Service Award
- Coast Guard Civilian Employee of the Year Award
- Coast Guard Civilian Service Commendational Medal
- Coast Guard Certificate of Appreciation
- Coast Guard Official Letter of Commendation

==== Public Service Awards ====
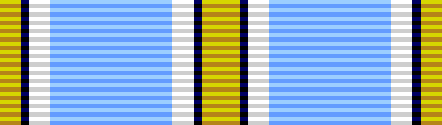
- Coast Guard Distinguished Public Service Award
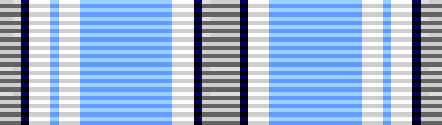
- Coast Guard Meritorious Public Service Award
- Coast Guard Public Service Commendation
- Coast Guard Certificate of Merit
- Coast Guard Certificate of Appreciation

=== U.S. Secret Service ===
- Director's Award of Valor
- Director's Lifesaving Award
- Director's Impact Award
- Director's Distinguished Service Award
- Director's Yes Award

=== Transportation Security Administration ===
- John W. Magaw Leadership Values Award
- Gale D. Rossides People First Award
- Gerardo Hernandez In The Line Of Duty Service Award
- Distinguished Career Service Award

== Department of the Interior ==
=== Honor Awards ===
- Distinguished Service Award
- Meritorious Service Award
- Unit Award for Excellence of Service
- Superior Service Award
- Citizen's Award for Exceptional Service
- Secretary's Award for Outstanding Contribution to Aviation Safety

=== Heroic Act Honor Awards ===
- Valor Award
- Citizen's Award for Bravery
- Exemplary Act Award

=== Other Honor Awards ===
- Departmental Unsung Hero Award
- Secretary's Diversity Award
- Environmental Achievement Award
- Award of Merit (Safety)
- Professional Service Award (Safety)
- Outstanding Service Award (for Political Appointees)
- Partners in Conservation Award

== Department of Justice ==
- Public Safety Officer Medal of Valor (awarded by the President to public safety officers cited by the Attorney General)
- Law Enforcement Congressional Badge of Bravery—Federal
- Law Enforcement Congressional Badge of Bravery—State and Local
- Secretary's Award For Distinguished Public Safety Service (may be awarded by the Attorney General or FEMA Director)
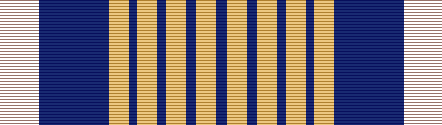
- Attorney General's David Margolis Award for Exceptional Service
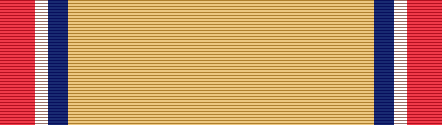
- Attorney General's Award for Exceptional Heroism
- Mary C. Lawton Lifetime Service Award
- William French Smith Award for Outstanding Contributions to Cooperative Law Enforcement
- Edward H. Levi Award for Outstanding Professionalism and Exemplary Integrity
- Attorney General's Award for Meritorious Public Service
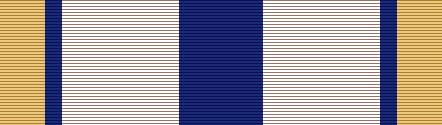
- Attorney General's Award for Distinguished Service
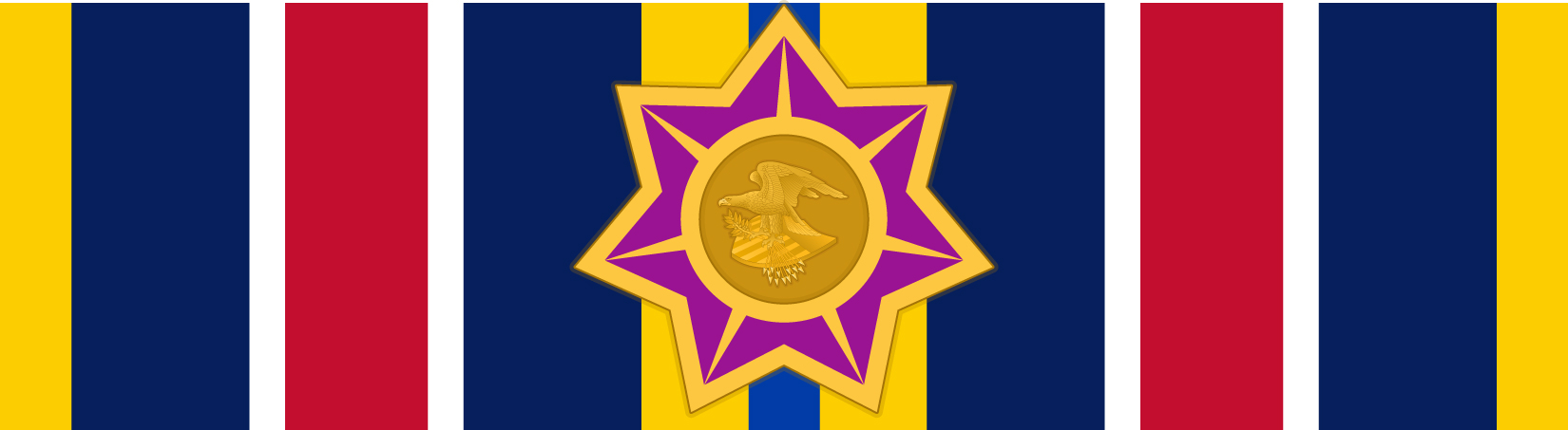
- Attorney General's Distinguished Service Award—Criminal Investigation
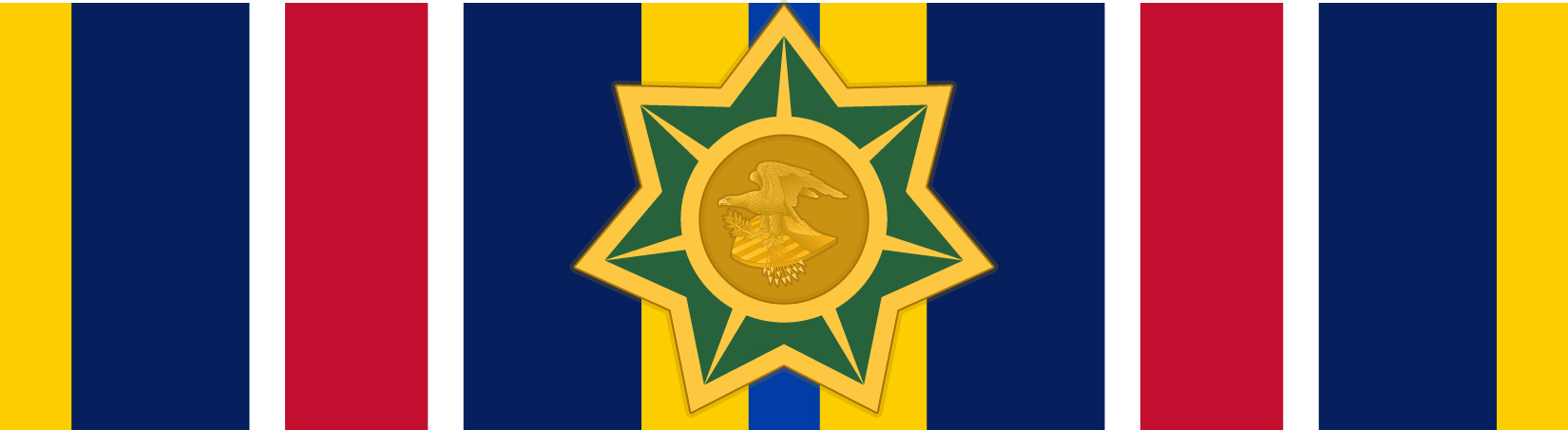
- Attorney General's Distinguished Service Award—Field Operations
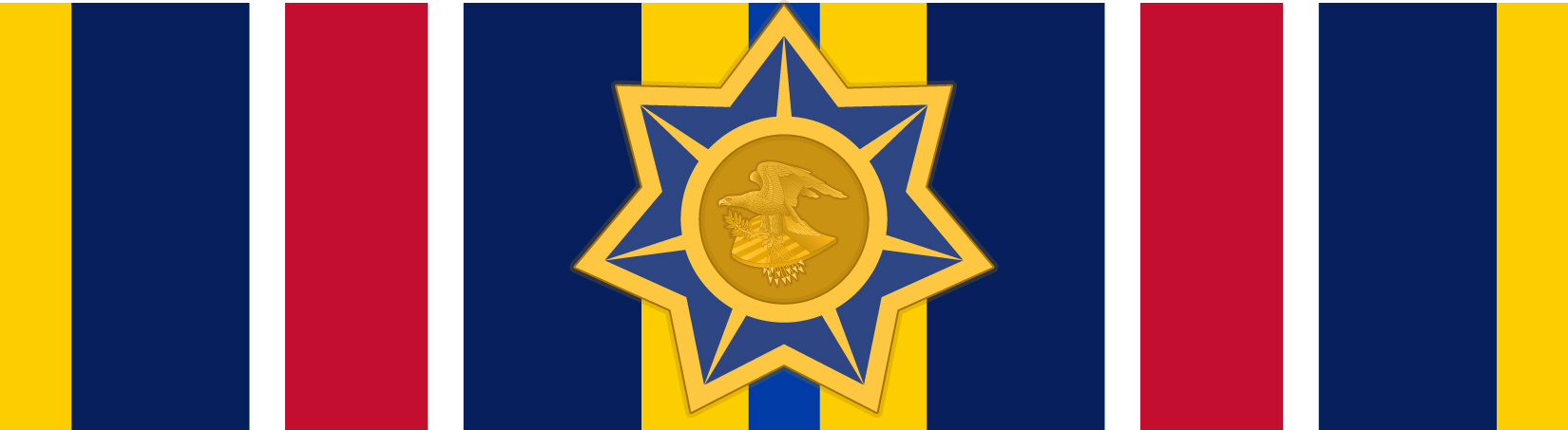
- Attorney General's Distinguished Service Award—Community Policing Innovations
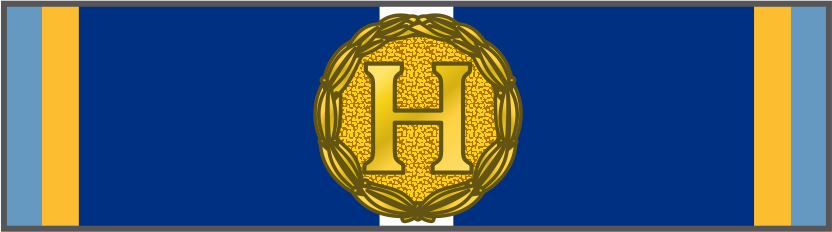
- 9/11 Heroes Medal of Valor
- Attorney General's Award for Excellence in Law Enforcement
- Attorney General's Award for Excellence in Management
- Attorney General's Award for Excellence in Information Technology
- Attorney General's Award for Excellence in Furthering the Interests of U.S. National Security
- Attorney General's Award for Excellence in Legal Support
- Attorney General's Award for Excellence in Administrative Support
- John Marshall Awards
- Attorney General's Award for Outstanding Service in Freedom of Information Act Administration
- Attorney General's Award for Fraud Prevention
- Attorney General's Award for Outstanding Contributions to Community Partnerships for Public Safety
- Attorney General's Award for Outstanding Service by a Federal Wage System Employee
- Attorney General's Award for Outstanding Contributions by a New Employee
- Young American Award; transferred to the Boy Scouts of America in 1971

=== Bureau of Alcohol, Tobacco, Firearms, and Explosives ===
- ATF Distinguished Service Medal
- ATF Gold Star Medal
- ATF Medal of Valor

=== Drug Enforcement Administration ===
DEA Purple Heart Award

=== Federal Bureau of Investigation ===
- FBI Star
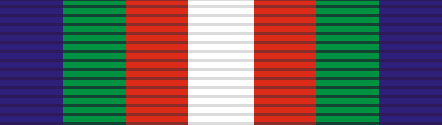
- FBI Medal for Meritorious Achievement
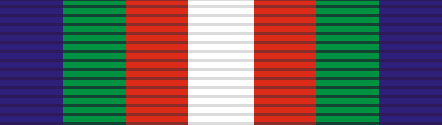
- FBI Shield of Bravery
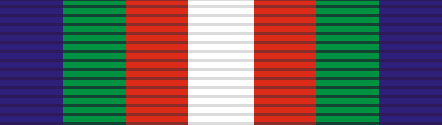
- FBI Medal of Valor
- FBI Memorial Star

=== Federal Bureau of Prisons ===
- Federal Bureau of Prisons Distinguished Service Medal (Gold Medal)
- Federal Bureau of Prisons Meritorious Service Medal (Silver Medal)
- Federal Bureau of Prisons Commendable Service Medal (Bronze Medal)

== Department of State ==
=== Honor Awards ===
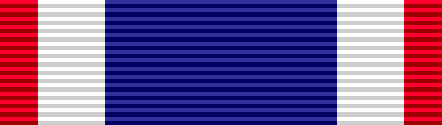
- Secretary's Distinguished Service Award
- Secretary’s Award
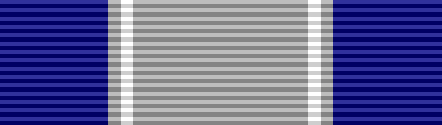
- Award for Heroism
- Thomas Jefferson Star for Foreign Service
- Distinguished Honor Award
- Superior Honor Award
- Meritorious Honor Award
- Richard C. Holbrooke Award for Diplomacy
- Presidential Award for Extraordinary Efforts to Combat Trafficking in Persons
- Franklin Award

=== Service Awards ===
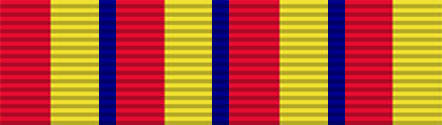
- Expeditionary Service Award
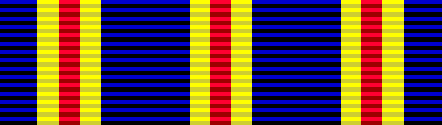
- Vietnam Civilian Service Award
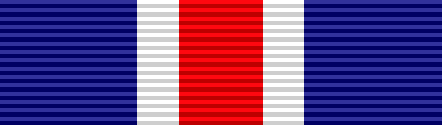
- Secretary's Career Achievement Award
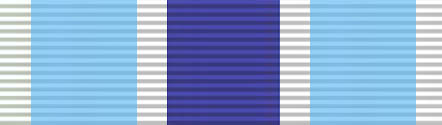
- John Jacob Rogers Award

=== Arms Control and Disarmament Agency ===
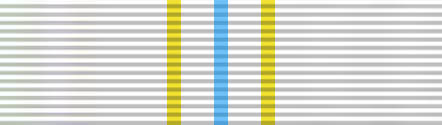
- Distinguished Honor Award
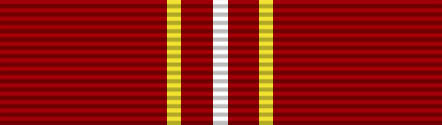
- Superior Honor Award
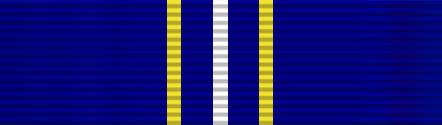
- Meritorious Honor Award

=== United States Information Agency (Defunct agency) ===
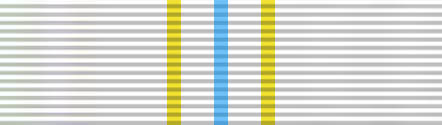
- Distinguished Honor Award
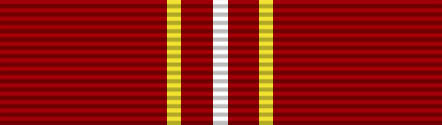
- Superior Honor Award
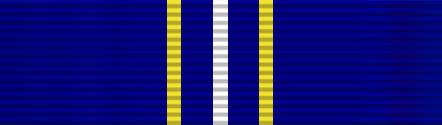
- Meritorious Honor Award

== Department of Transportation ==
- Secretary of Transportation Outstanding Achievement Medal
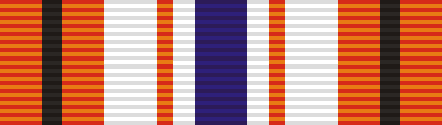
- Department of Transportation Meritorious Achievement Medal
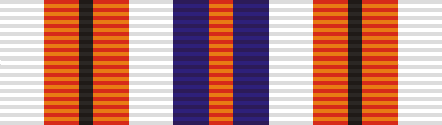
- Department of Transportation Superior Achievement Medal
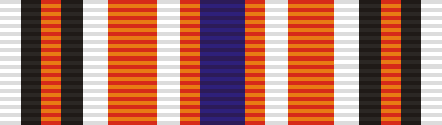
- Department of Transportation Medal for Valor
- Guardian Medal
- Transportation 9-11 Medal
- Transportation 9-11 Ribbon
- Secretary of Transportation Outstanding Unit Award
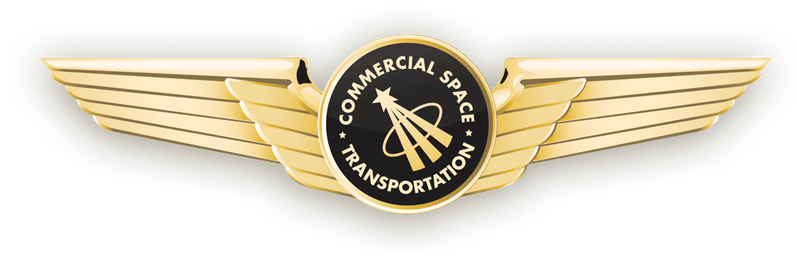
- Commercial Astronaut Wings

=== Federal Aviation Administration ===
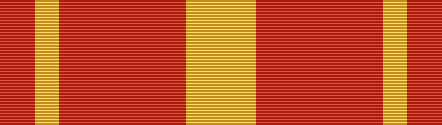
- FAA Valor Medal
- FAA Wright Brothers Master Pilot Award
- FAA Charles Taylor Master Mechanic Award
- FAA Pilot Proficiency Award Program
- General Aviation Awards Program

=== Maritime Administration ===
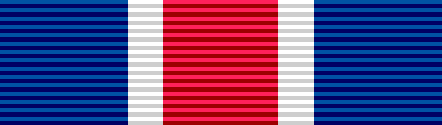
- Distinguished Service Medal
- Meritorious Service Medal
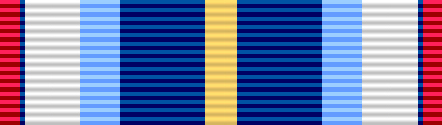
- Outstanding Achievement Medal
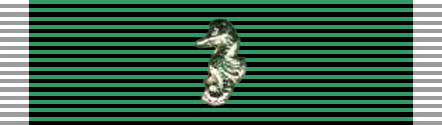
- Gallant Ship Citation
- Mariner's Medal
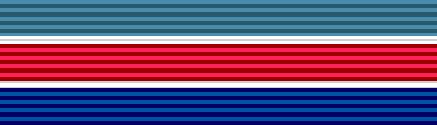
- Combat Bar
- Defense Medal
- Atlantic War Zone Medal
- Mediterranean-Middle East War Zone
- Pacific War Zone Medal
- World War II Victory Medal
- Korean Service Medal
- Vietnam Service Medal
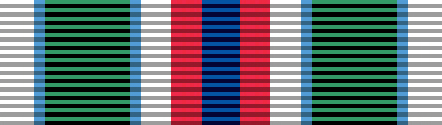
- Expeditionary Medal

== Department of the Treasury ==
- Alexander Hamilton Award
- Albert Gallatin Award
- Distinguished Service Award
- Exceptional Service Award
- Meritorious Service Award
- Secretary's Honor Award
- Secretary’s Certificate of Appreciation
- Assistant Secretary for Public Affairs Certificate of Distinguished Service

=== Internal Revenue Service ===
IRS Commissioner's Award

=== Office of Thrift Supervision ===
OTS Director's Award for Excellence

== American Battle Monument Commission ==
- Distinguished Service Service Ribbon
- Superior Service Service Ribbon
- Meritorious Service Service Ribbon
- Commendable Service Ribbon
- Distinguished Public Service Service Ribbon
- Superior Public Service Service Ribbon
- Meritorious Public Service Ribbon

== Broadcasting Board of Governors ==
- Distinguished Honor Award
- David Burke Distinguished Journalism Award

== Environmental Protection Agency ==
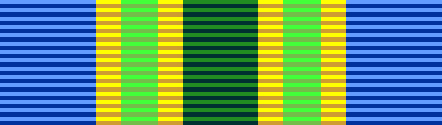
- EPA Gold Medal for Exceptional Service (individual and group)
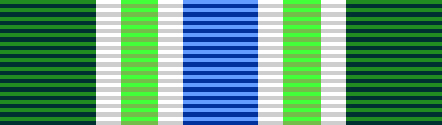
- EPA Silver Medal for Superior Service (individual and group)
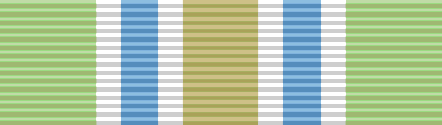
- EPA Bronze Medal for Commendable Service (individual and group)
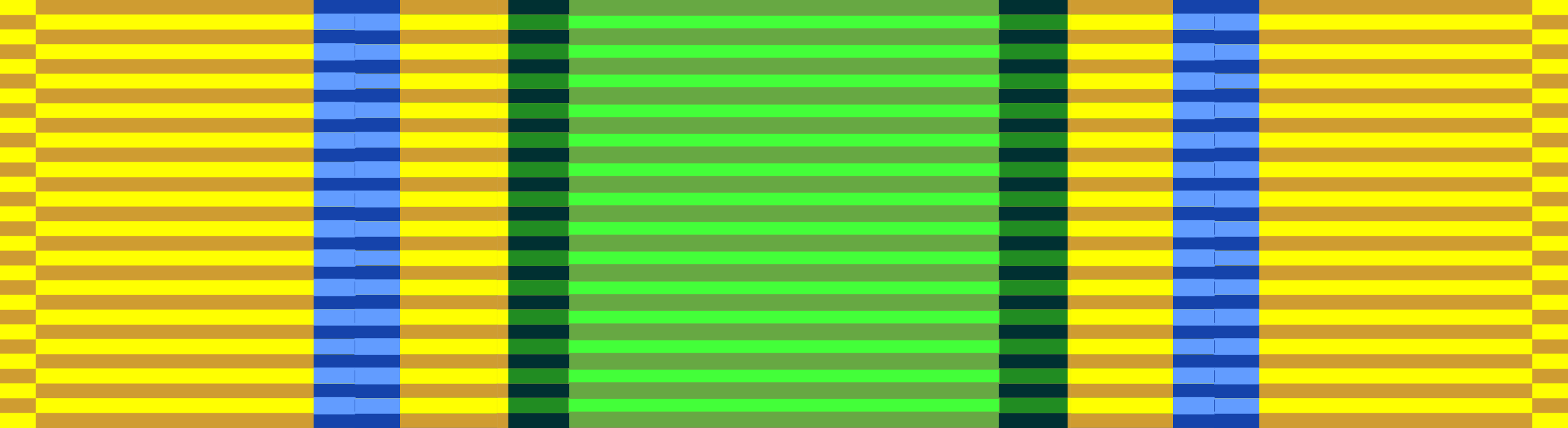
- EPA Distinguished Career Service Award
- Paul G. Keough Award for Administrative Excellence
- Glenda A. Farmer Award for Exemplary Technical Support
- Trudy A. Speciner Non-Supervisory Award for Advancing Environmental Protection
- President's Environmental Youth Award

== General Services Administration ==
- Administrator’s Distinguished Service Award
- Administrator’s Meritorious Service Award
- Administrator’s Excellence in Performance Award
- Administrator’s Exceptional Service Award
- Head of Service or Staff Office or Regional Administrator Exceptional Service Award
- Commendable Service Award
- GSA Design Excellence Award in Federal Architecture
- Travel & Relocation Excellence Award
- GSA Gold Star Award for Excellence in Implementing the Federal Computers for Learning Program (Executive Order 12999)
- Miles Romney Achievement Award for Innovation in Personal Property Management
- Bob Baker Fleet Manager of the Year Awards program
- GSA Federal Aviation Program Awards program
- GSA Achievement Award for Real Property Best Practices and Innovation
- GSA Federal Mail Best Practices Awards program

== National Aeronautics and Space Administration (NASA) ==
- Congressional Space Medal of Honor (astronauts only)
- Distinguished Service Medal
- Distinguished Public Service Medal
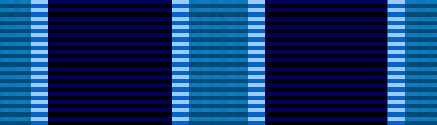
- Outstanding Leadership Medal
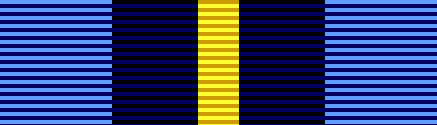
- Outstanding Public Leadership Medal
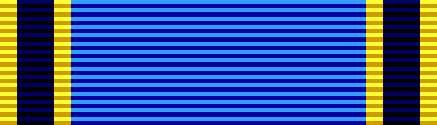
- Exceptional Service Medal
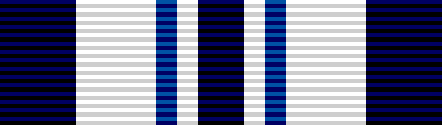
- Exceptional Service Medal Type I (obsolete)
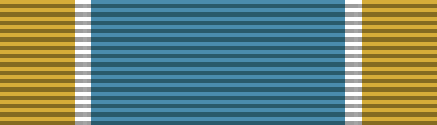
- Exceptional Public Service Medal
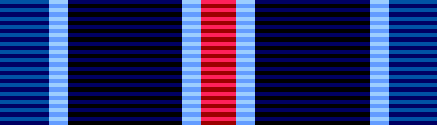
- Exceptional Bravery Medal
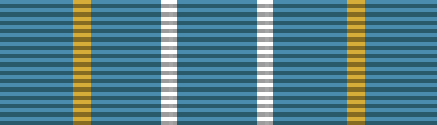
- Exceptional Engineering Achievement Medal
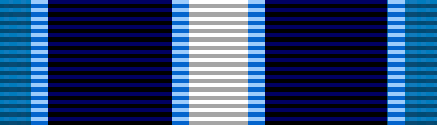
- Exceptional Scientific Achievement Medal
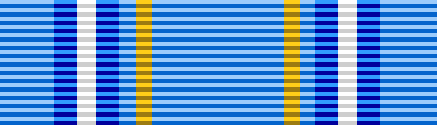
- Exceptional Technology Achievement Medal
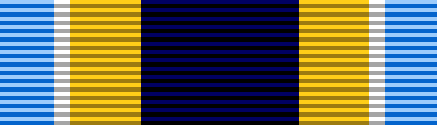
- Equal Employment Opportunity Medal
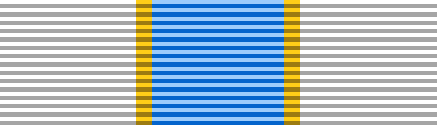
- Exceptional Administrative Achievement Medal
- Exceptional Achievement Medal
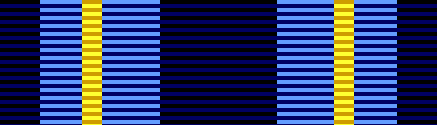
- Exceptional Public Achievement Medal
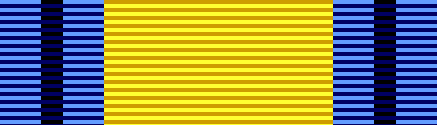
- Early Career Achievement Medal
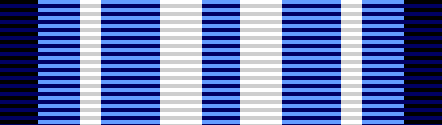
- Silver Achievement Medal
- NASA Group Achievement Award
- Space Flight Medal (astronauts only)
- Space Exploration Medal
- Silver Snoopy Award

== National Science Foundation (NSF) ==
- Antarctica Service Medal
- Presidential Award for Excellence in Mathematics and Science Teaching (PAEMST)
- Presidential Award for Excellence in Science, Mathematics and Engineering Mentoring (PAESMEM)
- Vannevar Bush Award
- NSB Public Service Award

== Office of Personnel Management (OPM) ==
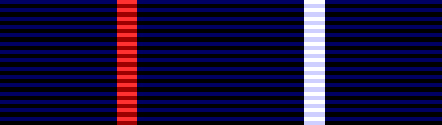
OPM Meritorious Service Medal

== Selective Service System ==
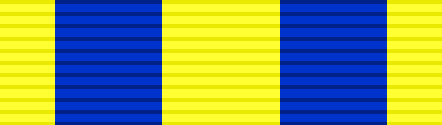
- Selective Service System Distinguished Service Medal
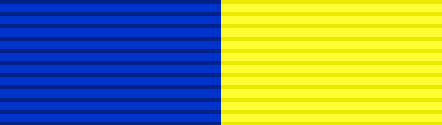
- Selective Service System Exceptional Service Medal
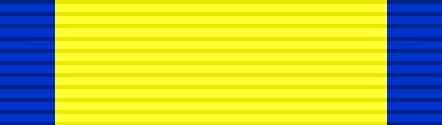
- Selective Service System Meritorious Service Medal
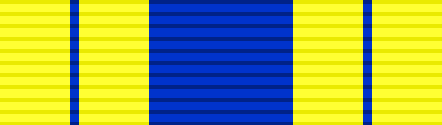
- Selective Service System World War II Service Medal

== Small Business Administration (SBA) ==
- Small Business Person of the Year
- Small Business Exporter of the Year
- Jody C. Raskind Microlender of the Year
- Small Business Investment Company of the Year
- SCORE Chapter of the Year

=== Awards to SBA Resource Partners ===
- Small Business Development Center (SBDC) Excellence and Innovation Award
- Women's Business Center of Excellence Award
- Veterans Business Outreach Center Excellence in Service Award

=== Phoenix Awards for Disaster Recovery ===
- Outstanding Small Business Disaster Recovery
- Outstanding Contributions to Disaster Recovery — Public Official
- Outstanding Contributions to Disaster Recovery — Volunteer

=== Federal Procurement Awards ===
- Small Business Prime Contractor of the Year
- Small Business Subcontractor of the Year
- 8(a) Graduate of the Year
- Dwight D. Eisenhower Awards for Excellence

== President's Council on Year 2000 Conversion ==
Y2K Service Medal

== United States Agency for International Development ==
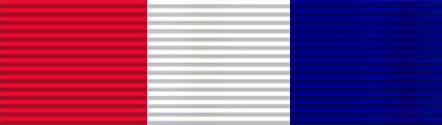
- Distinguished Honor Award
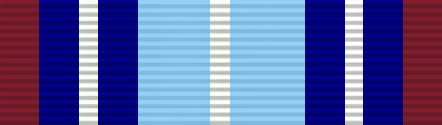
- Superior Honor Award
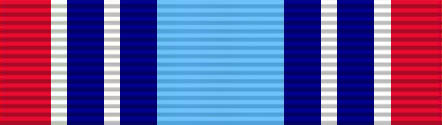
- Meritorious Honor Award
