= Global War on Terrorism Medal =

Global War on Terrorism Medal may refer to:

- Global War on Terrorism Expeditionary Medal, a United States Armed Forces award
- Global War on Terrorism Service Medal, a United States Armed Forces award
- Secretary of Defense Medal for the Global War on Terrorism, a United States Civilian Service Medal
