= Bronze Retirement Medallion =

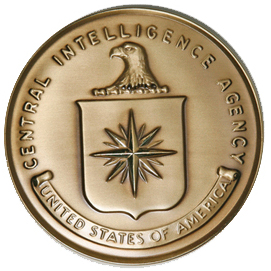
- Awarded for: "A career of at least 15, but less than 25, years with the Agency."
- Country: United States of America
- Presented by: Central Intelligence Agency
- Eligibility: Employees of the Central Intelligence Agency

Precedence
- Next (higher): Silver Retirement Medallion

The Bronze Retirement Medallion is awarded by the Central Intelligence Agency for a career of at least 15, but less than 25, years with the Agency.

== See also ==
- Awards and decorations of the United States government
