= DCMA Distinguished Civilian Service Award =

Medal ribbon of the Distinguished Civilian Service Award

The Distinguished Civilian Service Award is the highest honorary award of the United States Defense Contract Management Agency (DCMA). The award consists of a gold medal, lapel pin and certificate.

The award can be made to civilian employees of DCMA.
