= Silver Retirement Medallion =

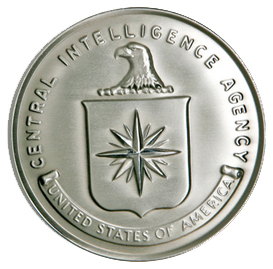
- Awarded for: "A career of 25, but less than 35, years with the Agency."
- Country: United States of America
- Presented by: Central Intelligence Agency
- Eligibility: Employees of the Central Intelligence Agency

Precedence
- Next (higher): Gold Retirement Medallion
- Next (lower): Bronze Retirement Medallion

The Silver Retirement Medallion is awarded by the Central Intelligence Agency for a career of 25, but less than 35, years or more with the Agency.

== See also ==
- Awards and decorations of the United States government
