= Gold Retirement Medallion =

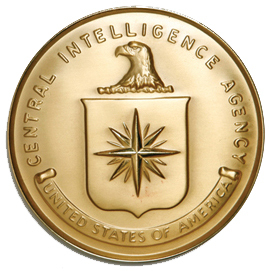
- Awarded for: "A career of 35 years or more with the Agency."
- Country: United States of America
- Presented by: Central Intelligence Agency
- Eligibility: Employees of the Central Intelligence Agency

Precedence
- Next (higher): Agency Seal Medal
- Next (lower): Silver Retirement Medallion

The Gold Retirement Medallion is awarded by the Central Intelligence Agency for a career of 35 years or more with the Agency.

== See also ==
- Awards and decorations of the United States government
