= Southwest Asia Service Medal =

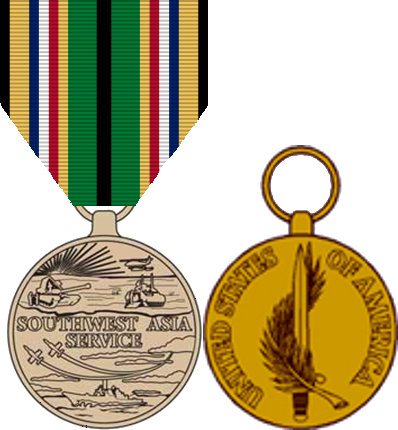
- Obverse and reverse
- Type: Military medal Campaign medal
- Presented by: the U.S. Department of Defense
- Eligibility: U.S. military personnel who served in Southwest Asia from August 2, 1990 (or January 17, 1991, for Turkey and Egypt) to November 30, 1995.
- Status: Not currently awarded
- Established: EO 12754, March 12, 1991, as amended
- First award: 1991 (retroactive to either August 2, 1990, or January 17, 1991, depending on location)
- Final award: November 30, 1995; 30 years ago
- Service ribbon: 1991 to 2016 Service ribbon: 2016 to present Southwest Asia Service Medal campaign streamer

Precedence
- Next (higher): Vietnam Service Medal
- Next (lower): Kosovo Campaign Medal
- Related: National Defense Service Medal; Kuwait Liberation Medal (Kuwait); Kuwait Liberation Medal (Saudi Arabia)

The Southwest Asia Service Medal (SASM or SWASM) was a military award of the United States Armed Forces which was created by order of President George H. W. Bush on March 12, 1991. The award is intended to recognize those military service members who performed duty as part of the Persian Gulf War and for a time thereafter. The medal was designed by Nadine Russell of the Army's Institute of Heraldry. The colors of the ribbon are tan, representing sand, with the black, white, red, blue, and green colors symbolizing the colors of coalition countries' national flags.

== History ==
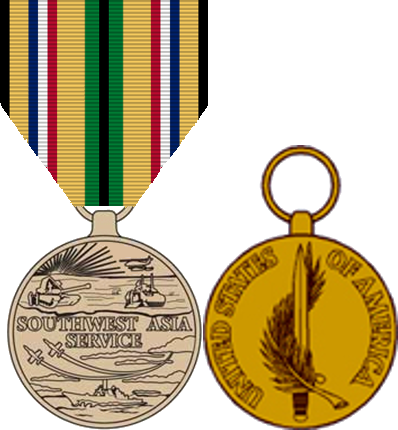
Southwest Asia Service Medal, in its 1991 to 2016 specification

Individuals awarded the Southwest Asia Service Medal must have participated in or supported military operations in Southwest Asia between August 2, 1990, and November 30, 1995. That period of inclusion includes participation in Operations Desert Shield or Desert Storm:

- Iraq
- Kuwait
- Saudi Arabia
- Oman
- Bahrain
- Qatar
- United Arab Emirates
- Persian Gulf
- Red Sea
- Gulf of Oman
- Gulf of Aden
- that portion of the Arabian Sea that lies north of 10 degrees North latitude and west of 68 degrees East longitude

Individuals serving in Israel, Egypt, Turkey, Syria and Jordan (including the airspace and territorial waters) directly supporting combat operations between January 17, 1991, and April 11, 1991, are also eligible for this award.

To receive the award, a service member must be: attached to or regularly serving for one or more days with an organization participating in ground/shore military operations; attached to or regularly serving for one or more days aboard a naval vessel directly supporting military operations; actually participating as a crew member in one or more aerial flights directly supporting military operations in the areas designated; or serving on temporary duty for 30 consecutive days or 60 nonconsecutive days, except, if a waiver is authorized for personnel participating in actual combat.

For those service members who performed "home service" during the Persian Gulf War, such as support personnel in the United States, the Southwest Asia Service Medal is not authorized. The award is also not authorized for those who performed support of the Persian Gulf War from European or Pacific bases.

=== 2016 redesign ===
In April 2016, the appearance of the suspension and service ribbon of the SWASM was slightly modified by the United States Department of Defense through the Defense Logistics Agency (DLA). The DLA made the two vertical green bars and one vertical black bar in the middle wider than in the original 1991 version.

== Campaign phases and devices ==
The following are the approved campaign phases and respective inclusive dates for the Southwest Asia Service Medal (SWASM):

Campaign	From	To
Defense of Saudi Arabia (DESERT SHIELD)	2 August 1990	16 January 1991
Liberation and Defense of Kuwait (DESERT STORM)	17 January 1991	11 April 1991
Southwest Asia Cease-Fire Campaign	12 April 1991	30 November 1995
Operation PROVIDE COMFORT	April 1991	30 November 1995

The following ribbon devices are authorized for wear on the Southwest Asia Service Medal:

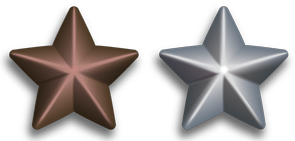
- Campaign stars (all branches)
- Fleet Marine Force Combat Operation Insignia (Navy personnel assigned to a Marine Corps unit in combat)

Examples of campaign stars worn on the Southwest Asia Campaign service ribbon:

One of the three campaigns
Two of the three campaigns
Three of the three campaigns

While several operations occurred in the geographical areas described above between April 12, 1991, and November 30, 1995, including Operation Provide Comfort (June 1, 1992 – November 30, 1995), Operation Southern Watch (August 27, 1992 – April 29, 2003) and Operation Vigilant Warrior (October 14, 1994 – December 21, 1994), these operations were covered under the third campaign, Southwest Asia Cease-Fire. Service in Operations that extended beyond the final campaign date of November 30, 1995, were recognized by awards of either the Armed Forces Expeditionary Medal or the Armed Forces Service Medal.

== See also ==
- Gulf War military awards
  - Mother of All Battles Medal, Iraqi equivalent
  - Civilian Desert Shield/Desert Storm Medal
