= Armed Forces Civilian Service Medal =

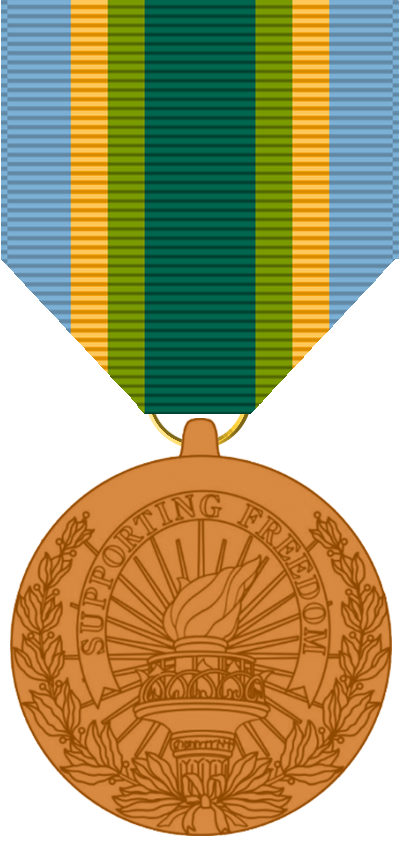
- The Armed Forces Civilian Service Medal (AFCSM)
- Type: Service medal
- Awarded for: Direct support of military forces, whose members are engaged in military operations of a prolonged peacekeeping or humanitarian nature.
- Presented by: the U.S. Department of Defense
- Eligibility: Civilian personnel
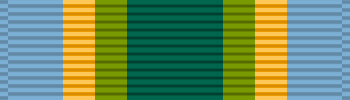
- Ribbon

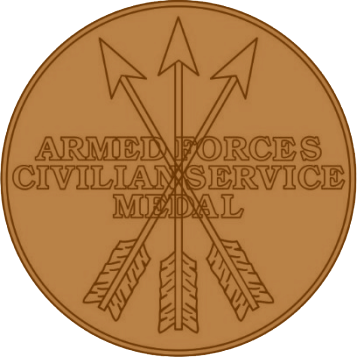
- Reverse
- First award: 22 August 1997

Precedence
- Next (higher): Secretary of the Army Award for Outstanding Achievement in Materiel Acquisition
- Equivalent: Armed Forces Service Medal

The Armed Forces Civilian Service Medal (AFCSM) is established to recognize the contributions and accomplishments of the U.S. Department of Defense civilian workforce who directly support the military forces, when those members are engaged in military operations of a prolonged peacekeeping or humanitarian nature. The AFCSM symbolizes the importance the Department of Defense attaches to civilian service and recognizes the value of civilian service in helping to accomplish the U.S. Government's objectives. This award honors those employees who support designated operations under the same or similar conditions as U.S. military members, thereby strengthening the partnership between the civilian services and uniformed services.

== Eligibility ==
The award is approved for issuance to eligible civilian employees as defined in Title 5 U.S.C. § 2105 who would be eligible for awards under DOD 1400.25-M, "Department of Defense Civilian Personnel Manual (CPM)", including non-appropriated fund employees. In most cases, that means that if an employee is eligible for other Army honorary awards, they would also be eligible to receive the AFCSM. In the September 14, 2020 Under Secretary of Defense Memorandum, Under Secretary Matthew Donovon extended the June 30, 2020 USD Memorandum to include civilians performing duties related to the COVID-19 Pandemic.

== Criteria ==
Any eligible civilian employee who has been in the theater of operations and meets the other qualifying criteria is eligible for the award. Qualifying operations must have occurred after 1 June 1992, the ending date has yet to be determined. No more than one AFCSM medal may be awarded to any one civilian employee. A contribution to or support of an AFSM military operation by employees assigned to locations outside the areas of eligibility, are not eligible for award of the AFCSM. Such performance or contribution, if merited, may be acknowledged by other appropriate recognition.

Further qualifications are as follows:

- Civilians must have been involved in direct support of the Armed Forces in a specifically designated military operation beginning on or after 1 June 1992. To date, the designated operations are the following: Former Republic of Yugoslavia Operations (Maritime Monitor, Provide Promise, Deny Flight, Sharp Guard, Able Sentry, Joint Endeavor, Joint Guard, and Joint Forge); Haiti Operations (UN Mission in Haiti, US Forces Haiti, and US Support Group Haiti); and Provide Comfort.
- As a general rule, when the Chairman of the Joint Chiefs of Staff has approved issuance of the Armed Forces Service Medal (AFSM) for military participation in humanitarian or peacekeeping operations, the AFCSM may be awarded for the same operation.
- Employees must be engaged in direct support of the military for 30 consecutive days in the area of eligibility or for the full period when an operation is of less than 30 days in a military operation awarded the AFSM.
- The employee may also qualify for the medal by providing direct support for 60 non-consecutive days in an AFSM operation provided this support involves the employee entering the areas of eligibility. The areas of eligibility are the same as designated for approved AFSM military operations, specifically:

1. The foreign territory on which military troops have actually landed or are present and specifically deployed for the operation;
2. Adjacent water areas in which ships are operating, patrolling, or providing direct support of the operation; and
3. The air space above and adjacent to the area in which an operation is being conducted.

== Appearance ==
The medal is circular, made of bronze color metal. The medal is 1 3/8 inches (35 mm) in diameter. The obverse depicts a torch, like that held by the Statue of Liberty, superimposed upon a burst of rays. The torch is surrounded by a scroll inscribed SUPPORTING FREEDOM and further enveloped by a laurel wreath tied with a ribbon at its base. On the reverse are three crossed arrows, points up, and the inscription ARMED FORCES CIVILIAN SERVICE MEDAL.

The medal is suspended from a ribbon 1 3/8 in. wide with a 3/8" center stripe of jungle green and 1/4" bluebird edges. Flanking the center strip are 1/8" stripes of goldenlight and mosstone.

Subsequent awards of the medal are recognized by Bronze Service Stars.

== See also ==
- Awards and decorations of the United States government
- Armed Forces Service Medal
- Global War on Terrorism Civilian Service Medal

== Bibliography ==
- Foster, Frank C. (2002). A complete guide to all United States military medals, 1939 to present. Fountain Inn, S.C.: MOA Press. ISBN 1-884-45218-3. OCLC 54755134.
- Kerrigan, Evans E. (1971). American war medals and decorations. New York: Viking Press. ISBN 0-670-12101-0. OCLC 128058.
- Kerrigan, Evans E. (1990). American medals and decorations. Noroton Heights, CT: Medallic. ISBN 0-792-45082-5. OCLC 21467942.
- Robles, Philip K. (1971). United States military medals and ribbons. Rutland, VT: C. E. Tuttle. ISBN 0-804-80048-0. OCLC 199721.
