= DCMA Civilian Career Service Award =

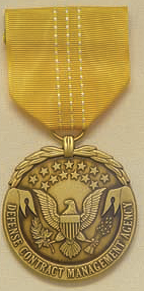

The DCMA Civilian Career Service Award (CCSA) is one of four honorary medals presented to civilians in the United States by the Defense Contract Management Agency (DCMA) for outstanding service.
