= President's Education Awards Program =

American K-12 education award

The United States President's Education Awards Program
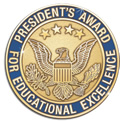
- Seal of the U.S. President's Education Award
- Sponsored by: United States Department of Education
- Country: United States
- Presented by: President of the United States and United States Secretary of Education
- First award: 1983
- Website: www2.ed.gov/programs/presedaward/

The President's Education Awards Program (PEAP) is awarded on behalf of the President of the United States and the United States Secretary of Education. PEAP was founded in 1983. The purpose of the program is to recognize students in elementary, middle and high school for their educational achievements.

Both the President's Award for Educational Excellence and the President's Award for Educational Achievement can be given at the sole discretion of the participating school's principal.

== President's Award for Educational Excellence ==
To receive the President's Award for Educational Excellence, students must be enrolled in elementary, middle, or high school, they must meet a minimum Grade Point Average (GPA) of 3.5. They must reach certain levels on state tests, or receive a recommendation from a teacher, as well as a strong production of academic excellence.

== President's Award for Educational Achievement ==
To receive the President's Award for Educational Achievement, students (from elementary, middle or high school) must demonstrate "educational growth, improvement, commitment or intellectual development." Listed below are the suggested examples as of October 2016.

- Demonstrate unusual commitment to learning in academics despite various obstacles.
- Maintain a school record that would have met the school's selection criteria for the President's Award for Educational Excellence but illness, personal crisis, or special needs prevented the student from maintaining such high standards despite hard work.
- Achieve a minimum of a 3.5 GPA
- Achieve high scores or show outstanding growth, improvement, commitment or intellectual development in particular subjects, such as English, math, science, etc.
- Demonstrate achievement in the arts such as music or theater.

== To apply ==
Only participating schools for the President's Education Awards Program can apply. Visit the U.S. Department of Education for a list of eligible schools.

== Awards ==
Each winner of the President's Award for Educational Excellence will receive a certificate with a gold seal for free. Pins based on the student's grade level (elementary, middle and high school) can be ordered for an additional fee.

Each winner of the President's Award for Educational Achievement will receive a certificate with a silver seal for free. Pins can be ordered for an additional fee. Unlike the President's Award for Educational Excellence, all grade levels receive the same pin for the President's Award for Educational Achievement.
