= Civilian Desert Shield/Desert Storm Medal =

Civilian Desert Shield-Desert Storm Medal
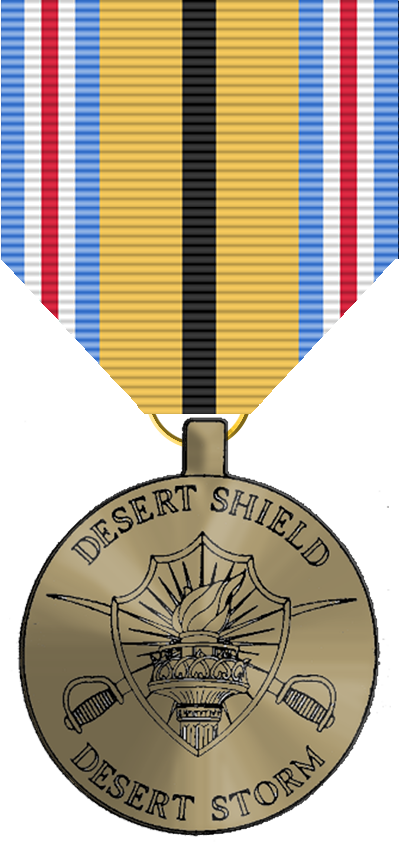
- Awarded for: Civilian participation in Desert Shield-Desert Storm
- Sponsored by: Department of Defense
- Ribbon

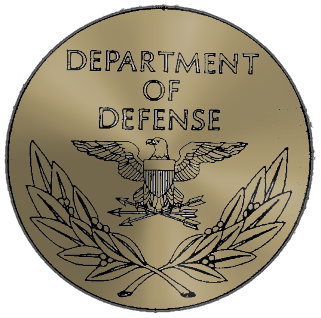
- Reverse

The Civilian Desert Shield/Desert Storm Medal is an award of the Department of Defense for civilian employees (including the Red Cross, the USO, and the Civil Reserve Air Fleet) who served in Operations Desert Shield and Desert Storm. The medal was proposed by Secretary of Defense Dick Cheney. The award was deactivated in 1997 and reactivated in 2000.

== Description ==
The circular medal is bronze with "DESERT SHIELD" written along its top, and "DESERT STORM" along its bottom. In the center it shows a shield with a torch adopted from the Statue of Liberty, placed over a pair of crossed sabers. The reverse design has the eagle from the Department of Defense official seal. Above is the inscription "DEPARTMENT OF DEFENSE" and below are crossed sprigs of laurel. The ribbon is similar to that of the Southwest Asia Service Medal, but with a base of tan with a single black stripe in the center and red, white and blue pin stripes on both the left and right.
