= Law Enforcement Congressional Badge of Bravery =

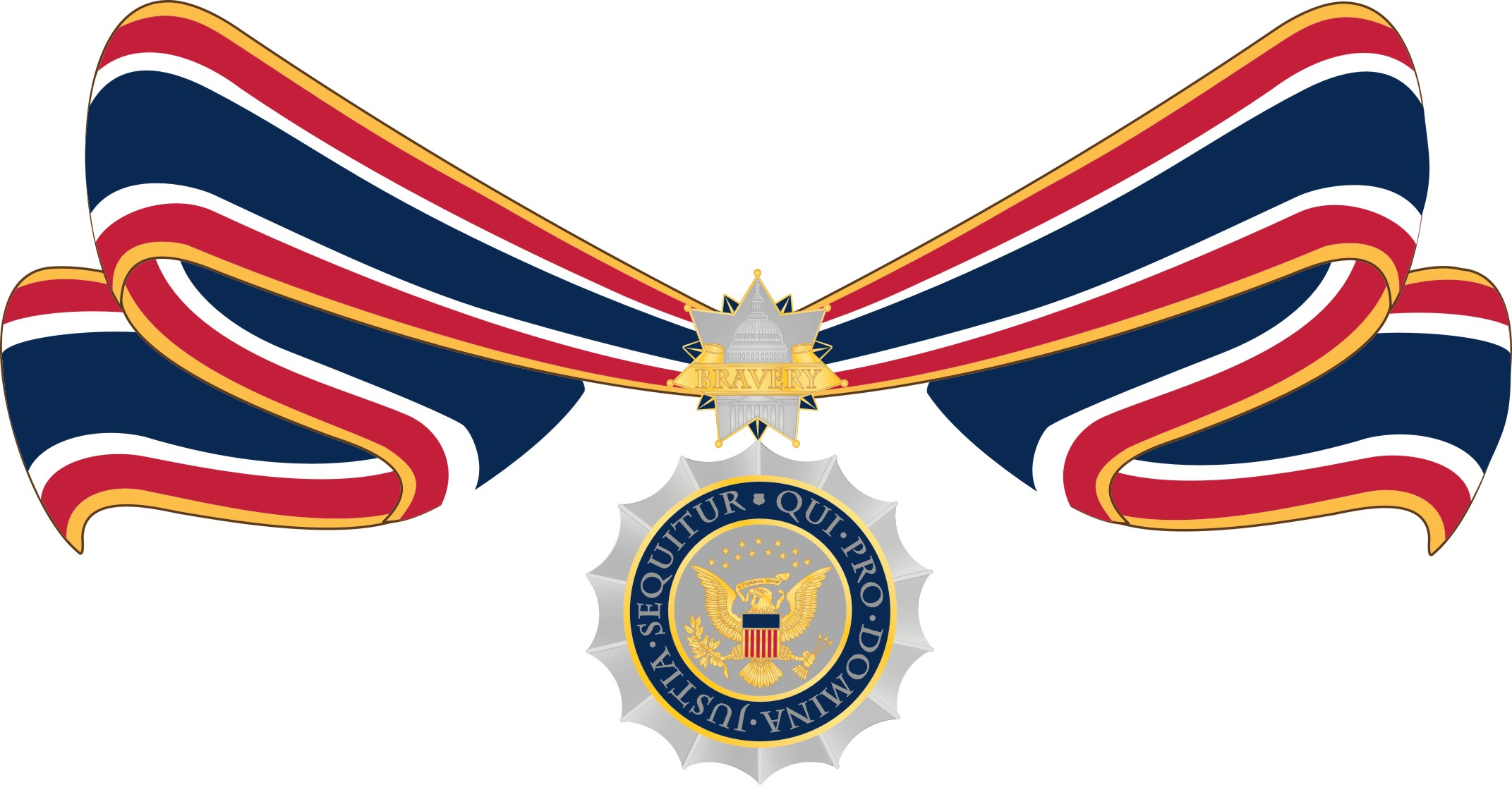
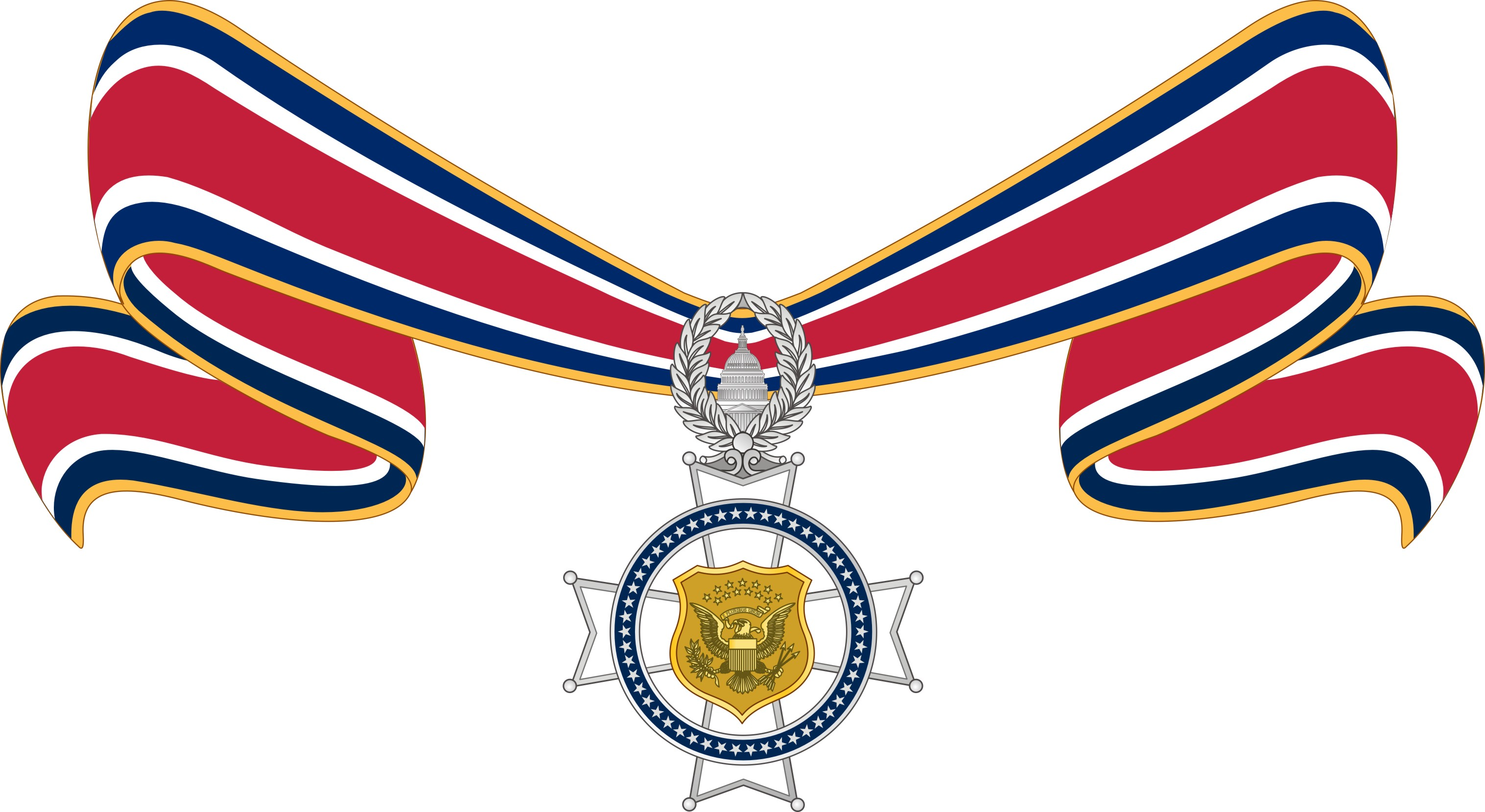
- Law Enforcement Congressional Badge of Bravery - Federal; Law Enforcement Congressional Badge of Bravery - State and Local

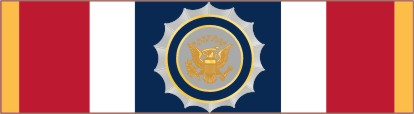
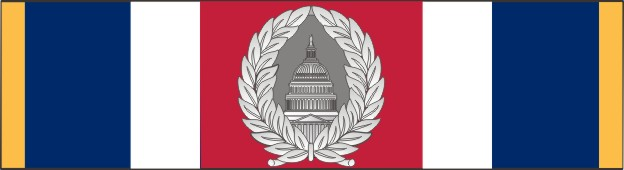
- Ribbon

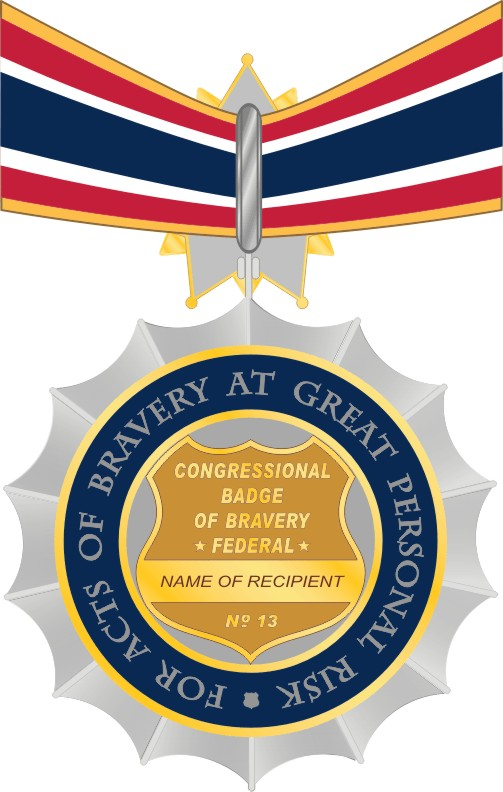
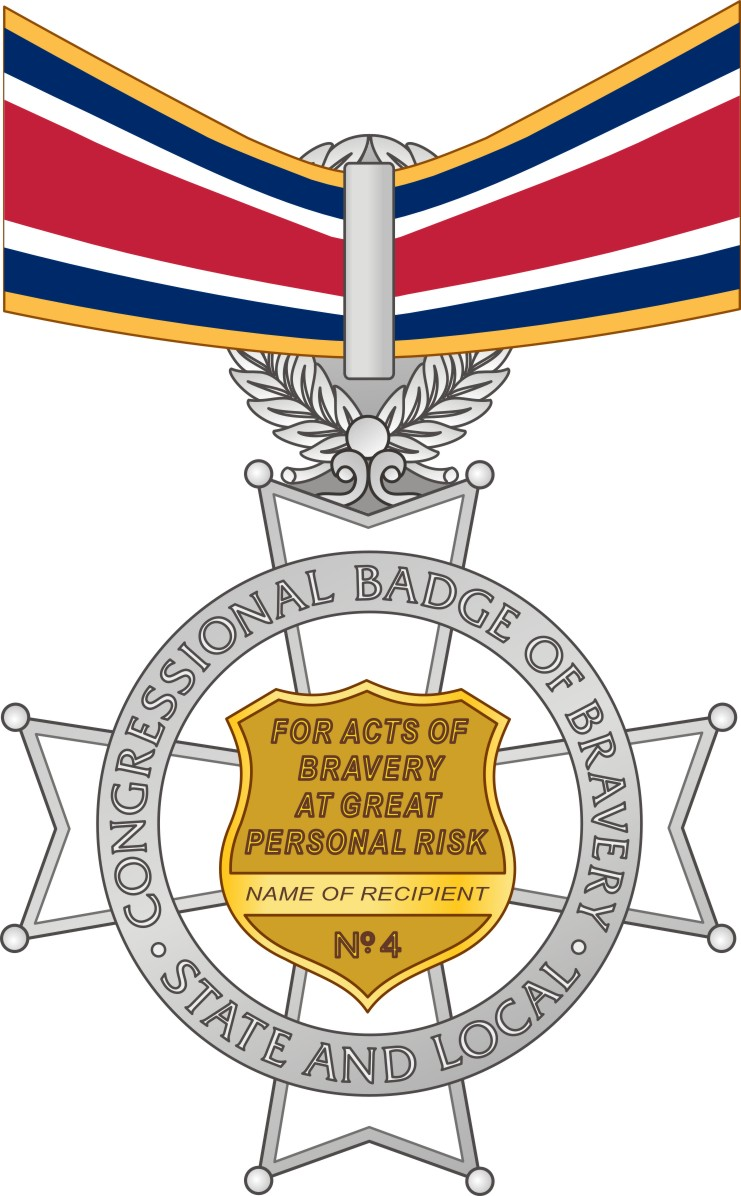
- Reverse

The Law Enforcement Congressional Badge of Bravery is an award of the United States Department of Justice that honors exceptional acts of bravery in the line of duty by federal, state, local, and tribal law enforcement officers. Congress passed the Law Enforcement Congressional Badge of Bravery Act of 2008 (Public Law 110-298).

== Criteria ==
To meet the definition of an act of bravery, nominees must have either:

1. Sustained a physical injury while engaged in law enforcement duty at personal risk; while performing an act characterized as bravery by the nominating agency head.
2. Although not injured, their actions placed the individual at risk of serious physical injury or death; while performing an act characterized as bravery by the nominating agency head.

== Description ==
The Federal badge is a blue ribbon with white, red and gold stripes. The medal is held to the ribbon by a silver starburst containing the Congressional Seal and a gold scroll inscribed LIBERTY. The circular badge shaped silver medal contains the national emblem in gold and an inscription QUI PRO DOMINA JUSTIA SEQUITUR which is the motto of the Justice Department.

The State and Local badge is a red ribbon with white, blue and gold stripes. The medal is held to the ribbon by a silver wreath enclosing the capitol dome. The medal is a white and silver cross with a circlet of 50 stars in blue around a gold police badge with the national seal on it.

== Recipients ==
The Department of Justice keeps a list of recipients by year on their website.
