= Galileo Award =

The Galileo Award recognizes innovative and creative solutions to the United States future intelligence challenges. It is normally granted on the basis of competitively judged papers submitted annually by individuals for juried review and is open to all eligible USG civilian and military personnel. USG civilian awardees receive accompanying monetary recognition.
