= Attorney General's Awards for Distinguished Service in Policing =

U.S. Attorney General's Distinguished Service Awards
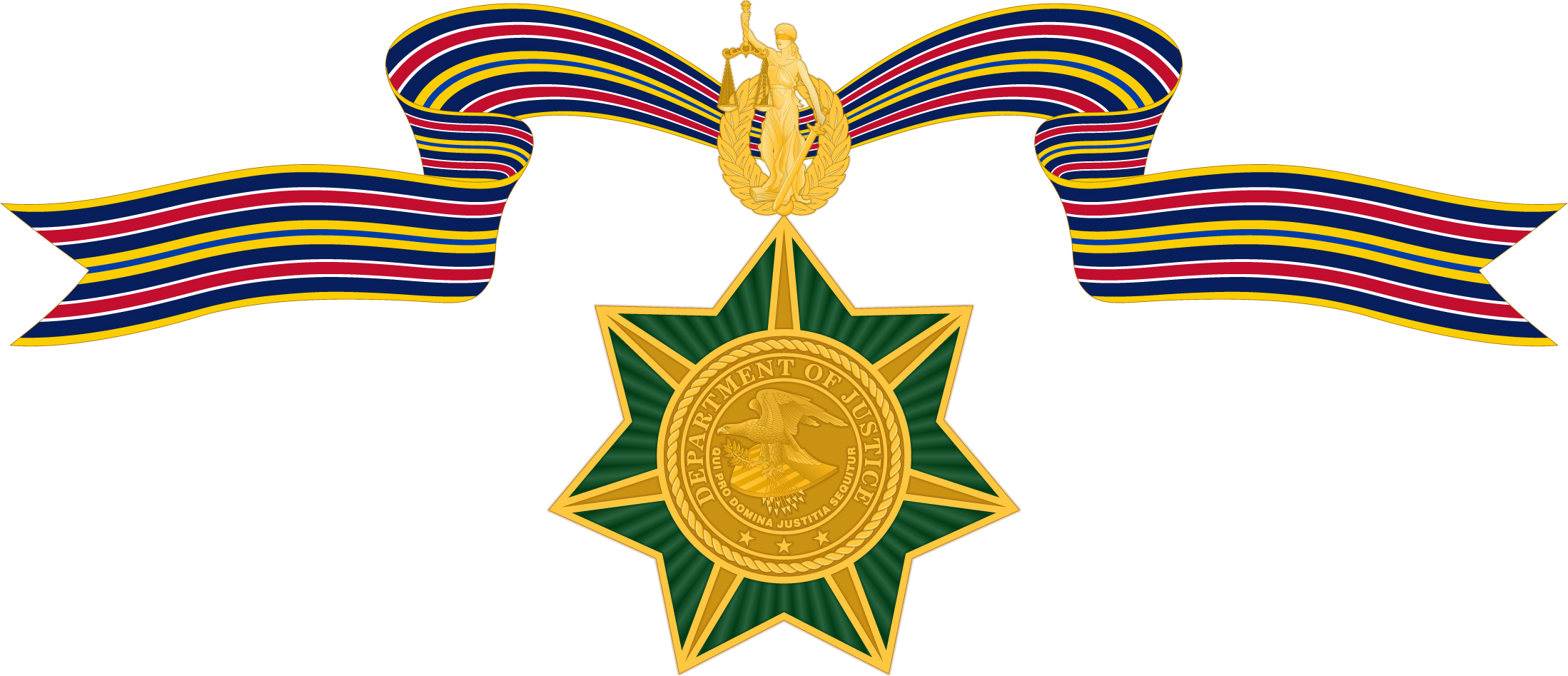
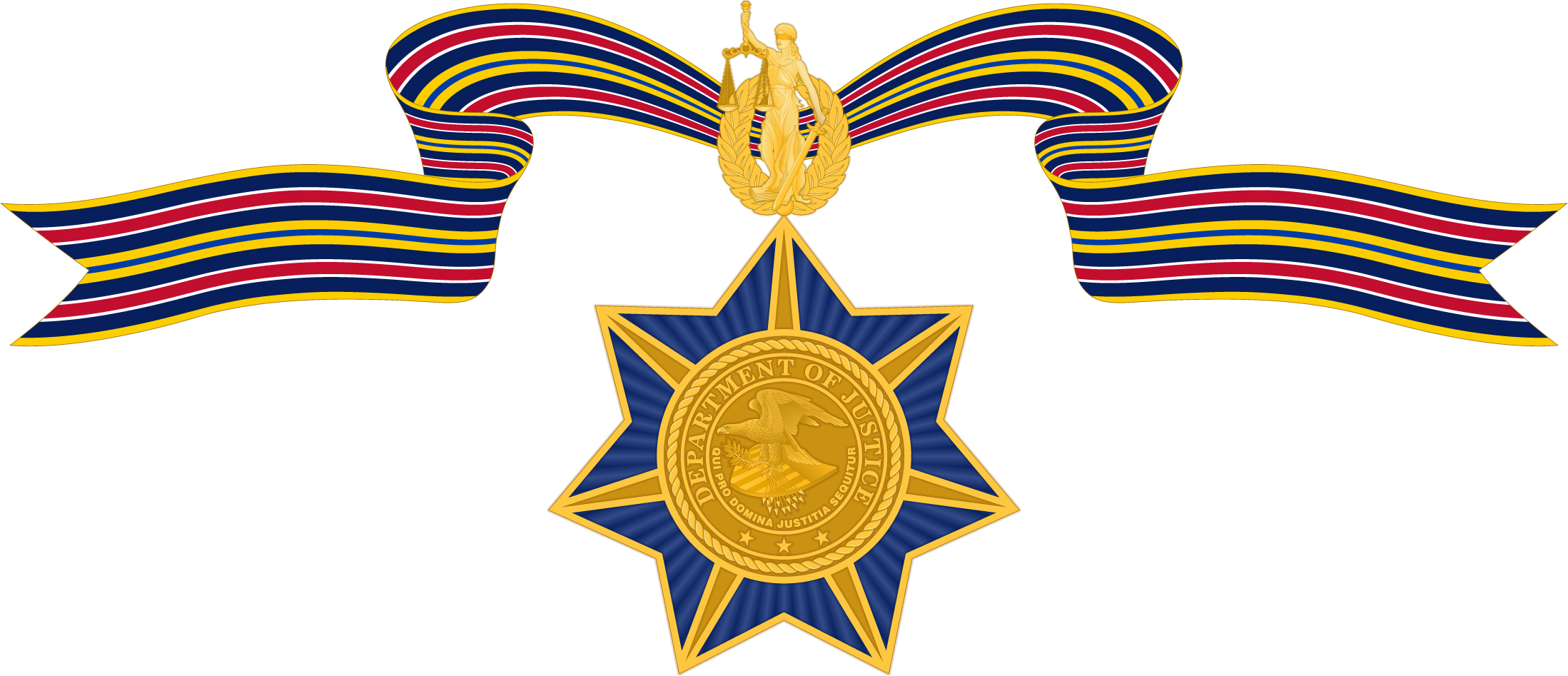
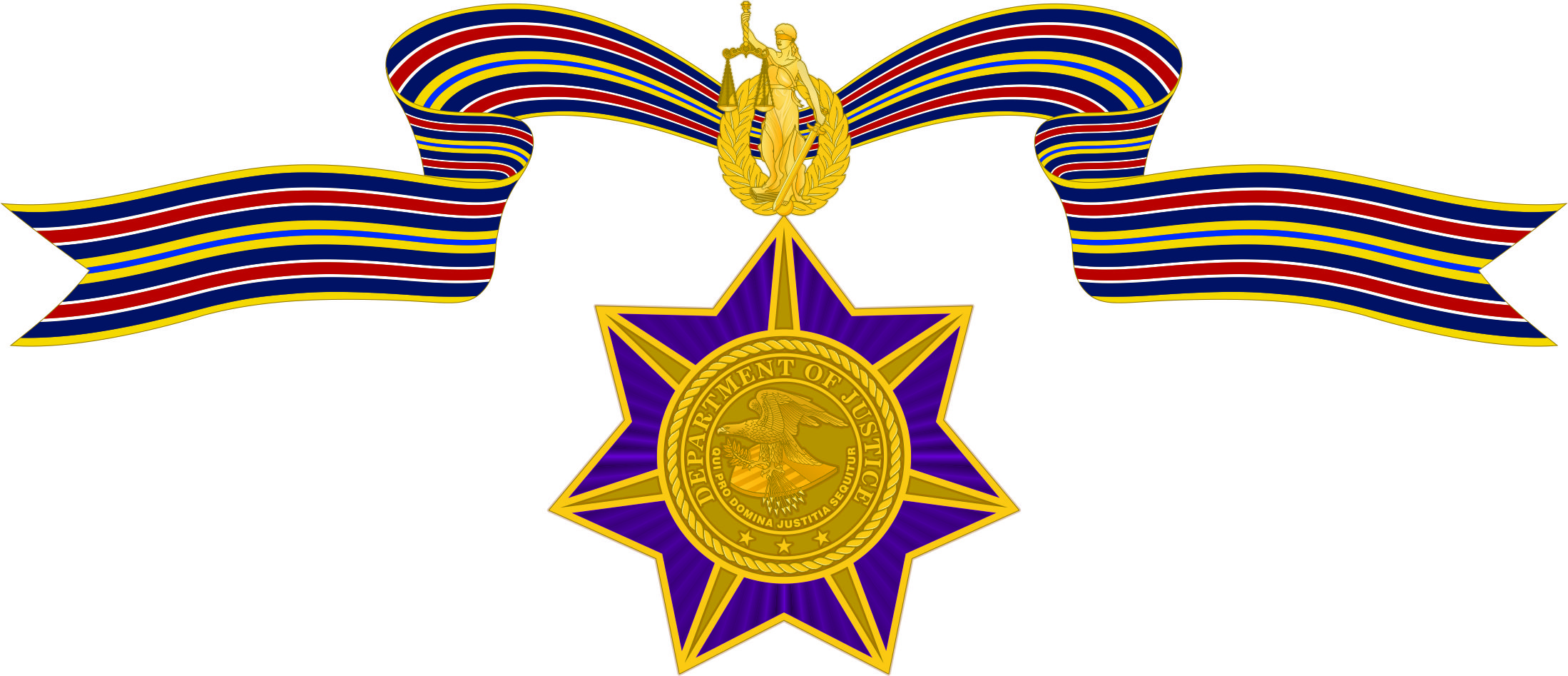
- Field Operations Criminal Investigation Community Policing Innovations
- Awarded for: Exceptional efforts in effective policing
- Sponsored by: U.S. Attorney General (Department of Justice)
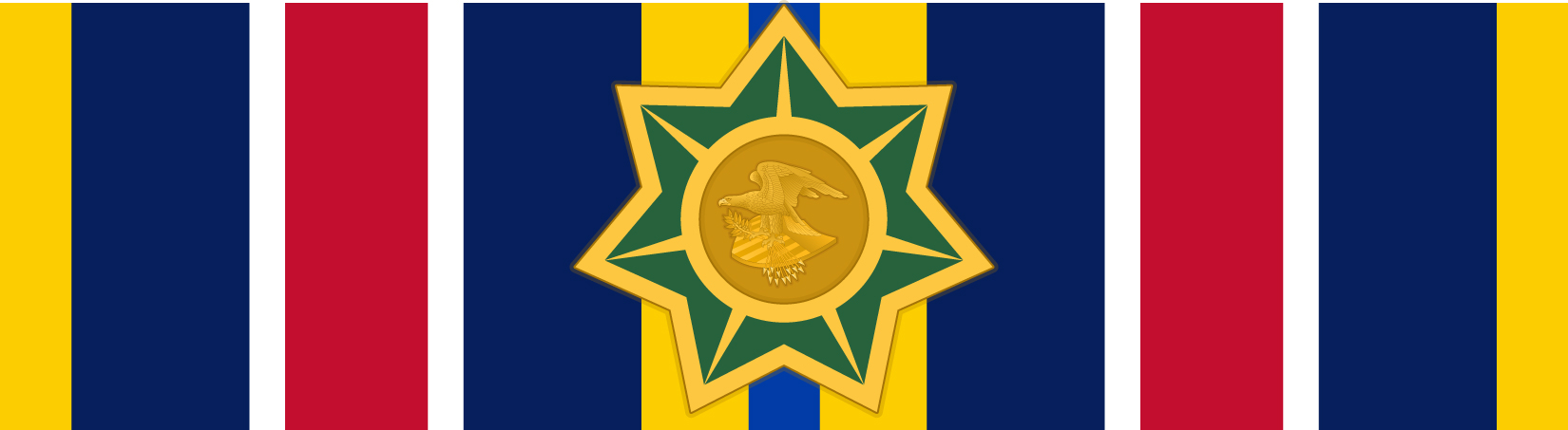
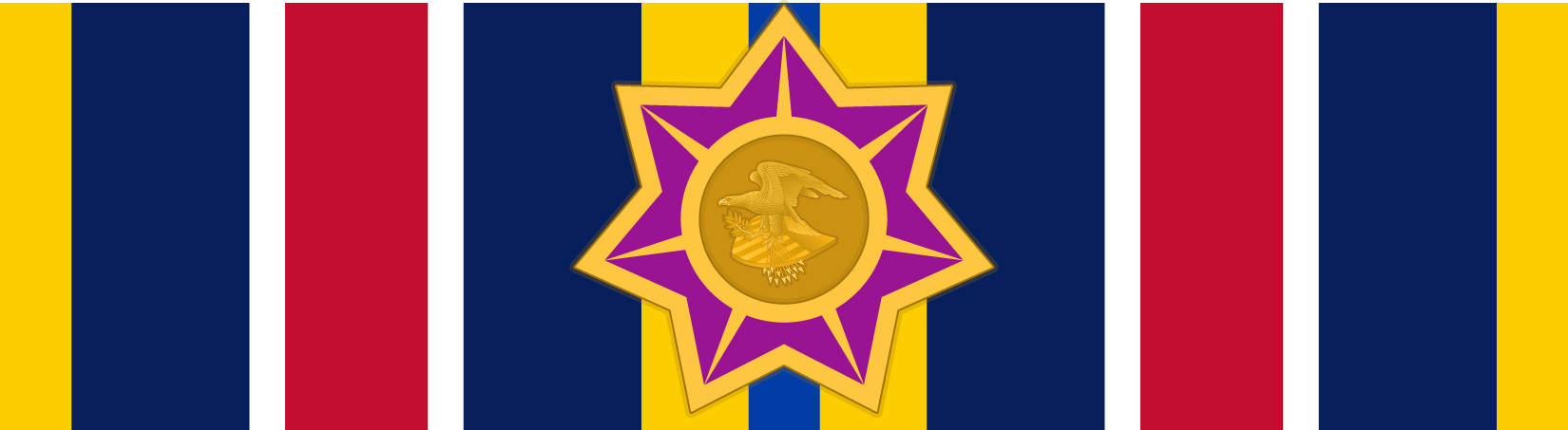
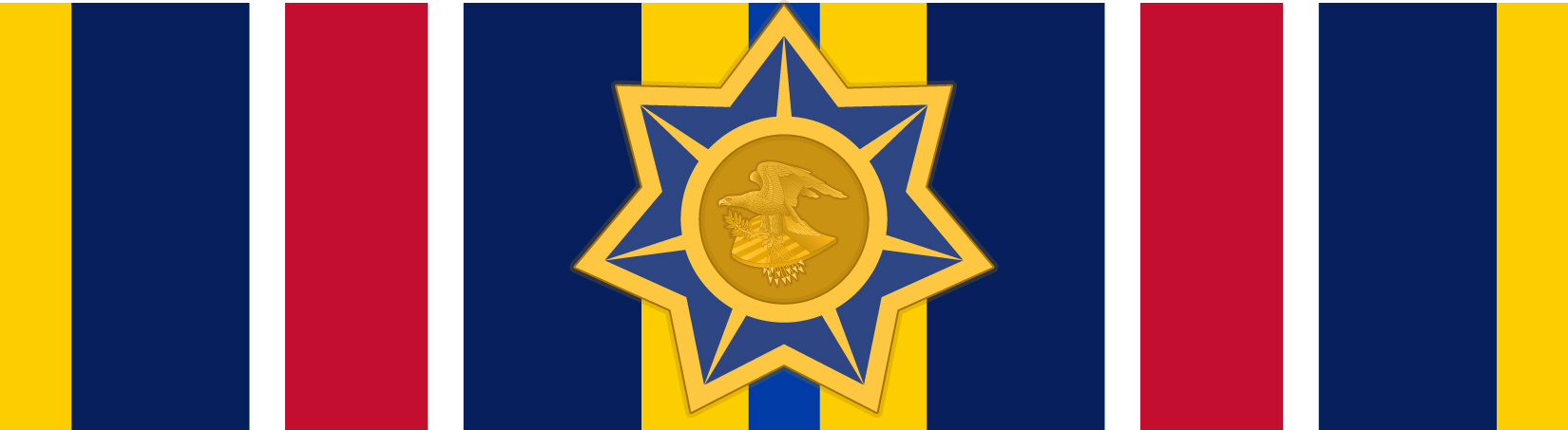
- Ribbon

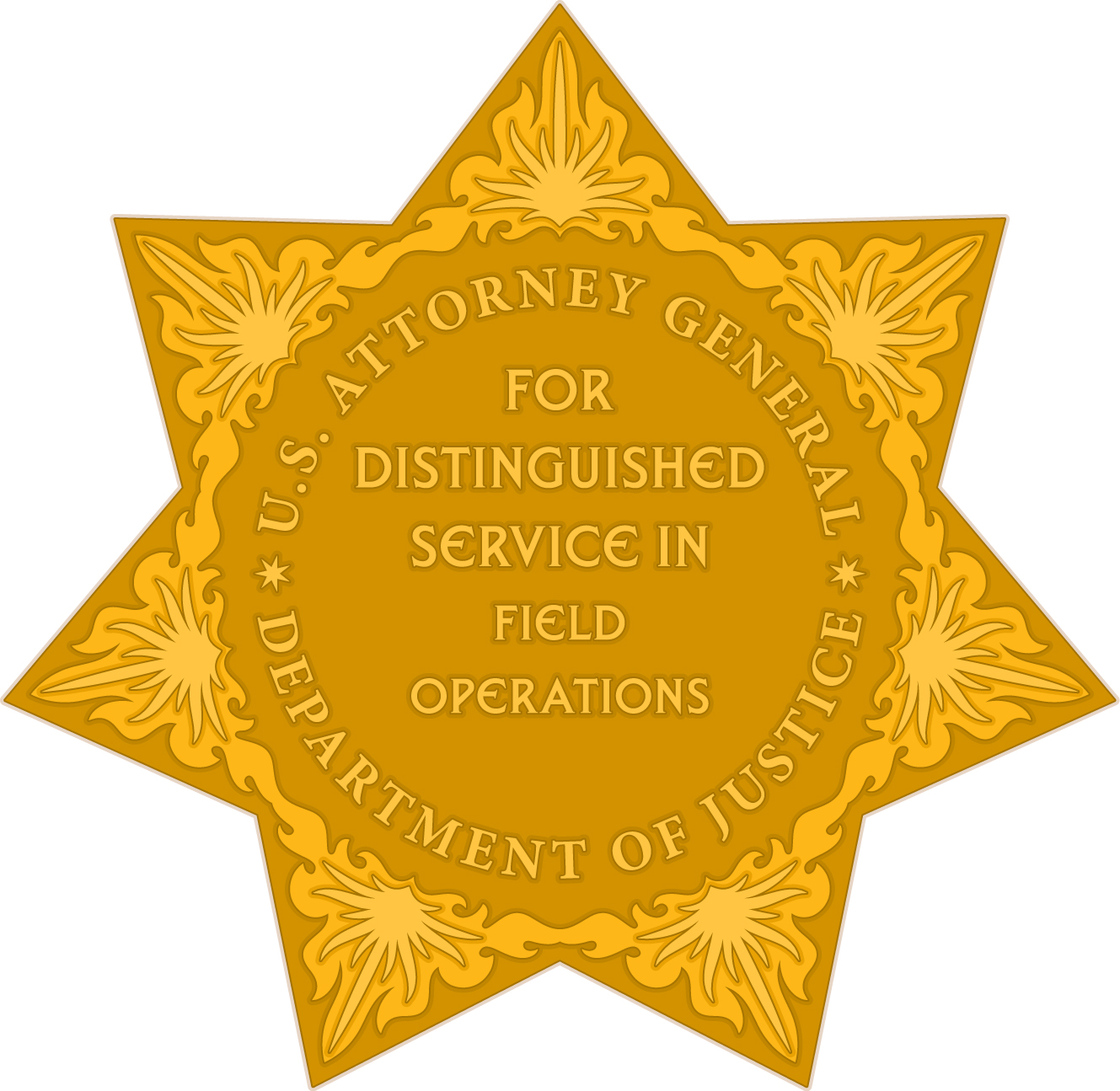
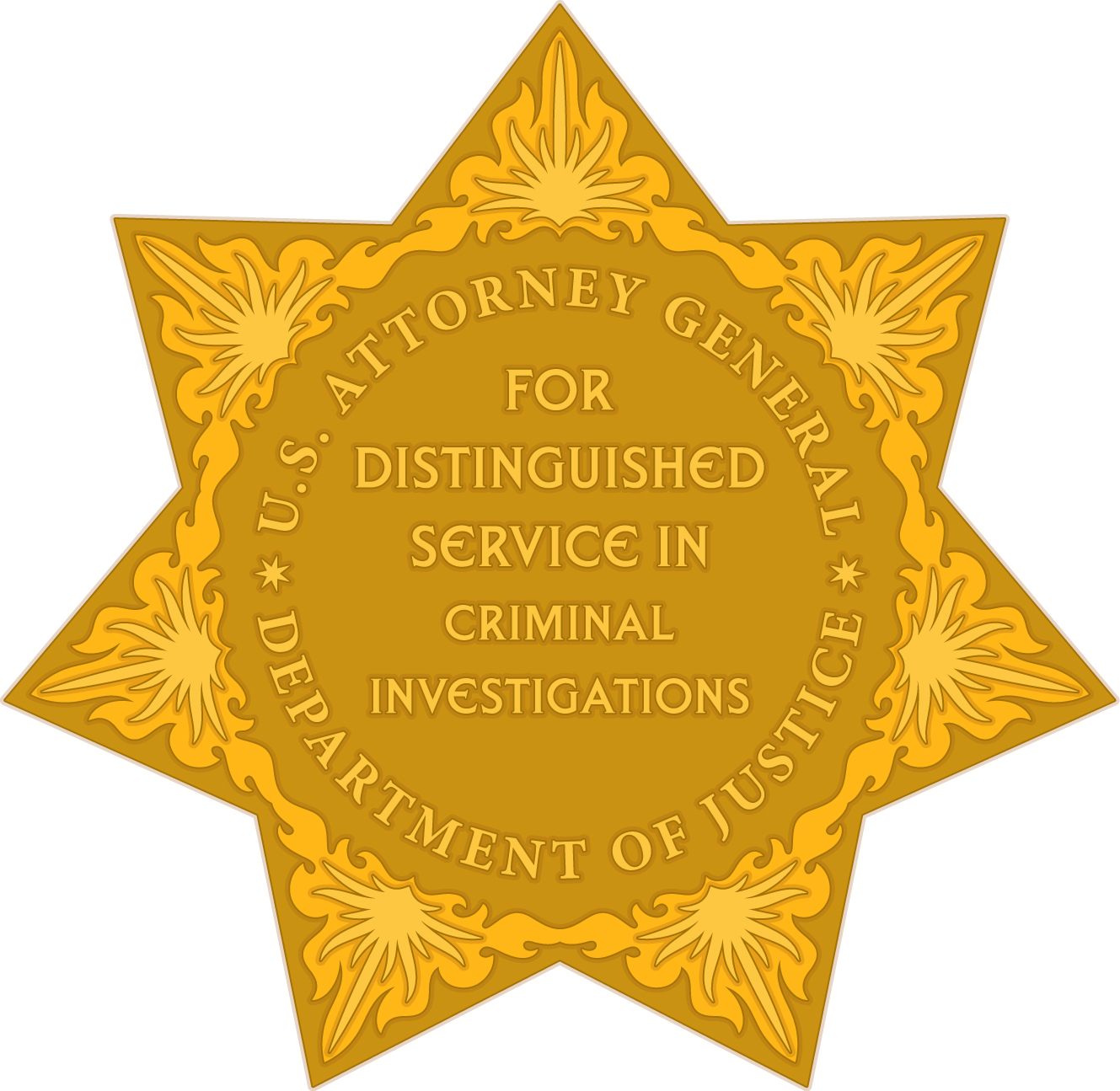
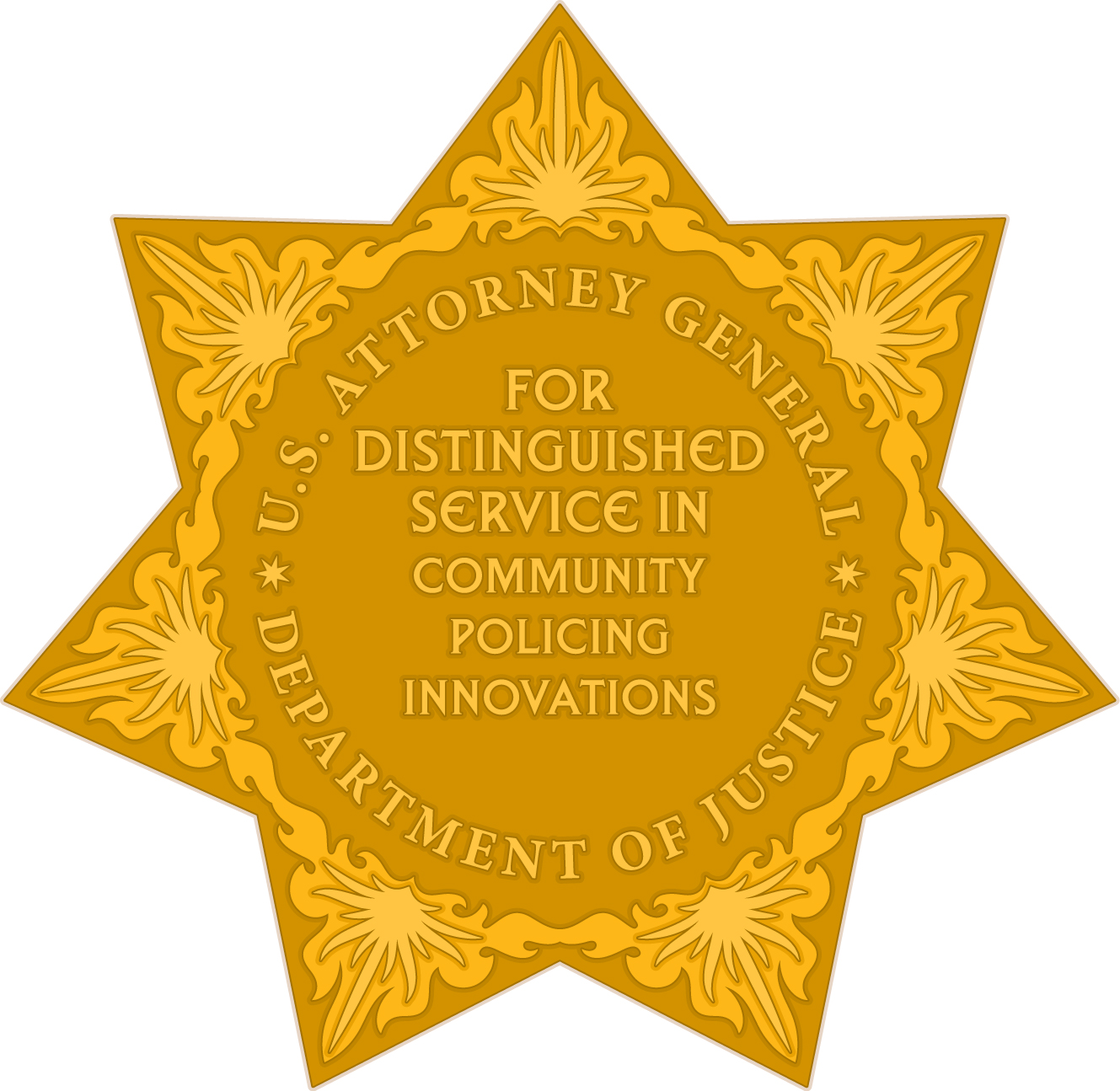
- Reverse

The Attorney General's Awards for Distinguished Service in Policing recognize individual or teams of local, state, Tribal or territorial law enforcement officers for exceptional and effective policing. The awards have been presented since 2016 by the U.S. Attorney General in Washington, D.C. at the Great Hall of the Robert F. Kennedy Justice Department Building. The awards are given in three categories: Field Operations, Criminal Investigations and Exemplary Community Involvement to rank-and-file law enforcement officers in non-supervisory positions.

== Description ==
The awards all follow a similar design from the U.S. Army Institute of Heraldry and include a formal medallion on a neck ribbon and a ribbon award for uniform wear. The awards are a gold seven-pointed star that is similar to many police badges with either a green (field operations), purple, (criminal investigation) or blue (community policing) outline with the seal of the Department of Justice in the center. Above the star is a golden representation of the statue of Lady Justice surrounded by a wreath connecting it to the ribbon. The reverse of the medallion is engraved with "U.S. ATTORNEY GENERAL, DEPARTMENT OF JUSTICE" in a circle and "FOR DISTINGUISHED SERICE IN" and then the category for the award. The uniform wear ribbon is the same ribbon with a smaller representation of the star on it.
