= Eugene C. Crittenden =

- Born: 19 December 1880; Oswayo, Pennsylvania
- Died: 28 March 1956 (aged 75); Washington D.C.
- Scientific career
- Fields: Physics

Eugene Casson Crittenden (1880–1956) was president of the Philosophical Society of Washington in 1922, and of the Optical Society of America in 1932.

Born in Oswayo, Pennsylvania, he studied at Cornell University. He worked at the National Bureau of Standards from 1909 until his retirement in 1950, becoming chief of the optics division and an associate director. In the mid-1950s he was appointed vice-president of the International Commission of Weights and Measures.

He was elected a fellow of the American Physical Society in 1950.

He was married and had a son and a daughter.

== See also ==
- Optical Society of America#Past Presidents of the OSA
