= Secretary of Defense Medal for the Global War on Terrorism =

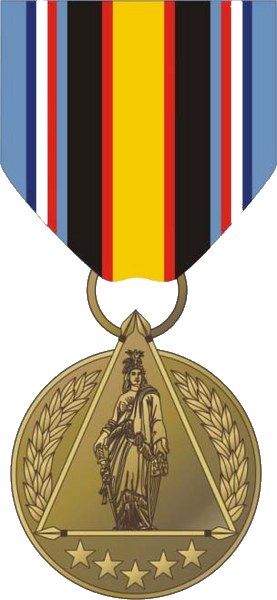
- Obverse of the medal
- Type: Civilian service medal
- Awarded for: 30-day continuous or 60-day non-continuous service deployed in support of Global War on Terrorism missions
- Country: United States
- Presented by: the U.S. Department of Defense
- Eligibility: Department of Defense civilians
- Status: Currently awarded
- Established: August 9, 2007
- First award: February 26, 2008 (retroactive to September 11, 2001)
- Ribbon of the medal
- Related: Global War on Terrorism Service Medal

The Secretary of Defense Medal for the Global War on Terrorism or Global War on Terrorism Civilian Service Medal is a medal awarded by the United States Department of Defense. It was authorized on August 9, 2007, but may be awarded for expeditionary service in a Global War on Terrorism mission in a combat zone on or after September 11, 2001, until a date to be determined.

== Criteria and eligibility ==
The medal was created and approved to recognize and honor the contributions and accomplishments of the civilian workforce of the Department of Defense in direct support of the armed forces, whose members are engaged in operations to combat terrorism. Civilians may only be awarded the medal once, and cannot be awarded the Armed Forces Civilian Service Medal for the same operation. Eligible civilians must have provided direct support and entered the designated geographic area of eligibility serving abroad in an operation that directly supported a U.S. military global war on terrorism operation. Geographic locations approved for award of the Global War on Terrorism Expeditionary Medal (GWOTEM) or similar operations for which a separate military campaign medal was awarded are used to determine eligibility for the Global War on Terrorism Civilian Service Medal. That service must have been under the following conditions:

- Employee was in direct support for 30 consecutive days in an area of eligibility in a military operation (or the full period when the operation is of less than 30 days duration)
- Employee was in direct support for 60 non-consecutive days in an area of eligibility provided this support involves the employee entering the area of eligibility
- Regardless of time, if the employee was killed or medically evacuated from the area of eligibility while providing direct support in the designated operation.

== Appearance ==
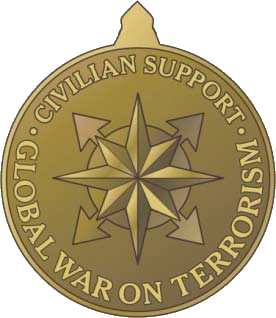

The obverse of the medal features the Statue of Freedom, a sculpture of the female personification of Freedom in Grecian garb. The statue is bordered in three sides by spears forming an upward pointing triangle. The triangle is flanked on either side by arched laurel branches with five five-pointed stars below. The reverse of the medal features an 8-point compass rose surrounded by the words CIVILIAN SUPPORT and GLOBAL WAR ON TERRORISM. The suspension ribbon is primarily the shade of medium blue associated with the Department of Defense which is also used on the GWOTEM.
