= Sherman L. Fleek =

American Military Historian

Sherman Fleek
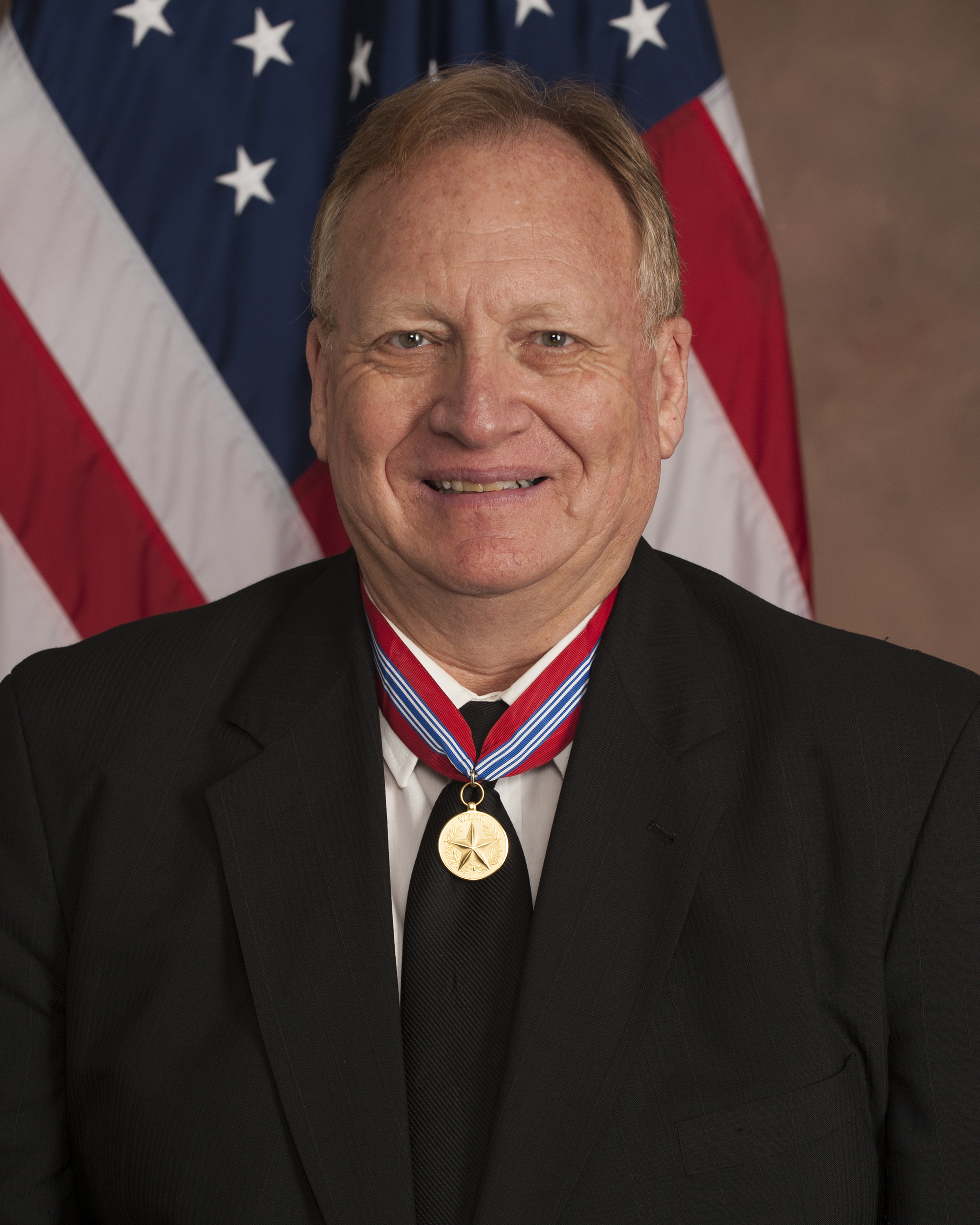
- Sherman Fleek and the Secretary of the Army Award for Valor
- Born: Sherman L. Fleek; 5 September 1955 (age 70); Hill Air Force Base, Utah, U.S.
- Allegiance: United States
- Branch: United States Army
- Rank: Lieutenant Colonel (United States) (Retired)
- Education: Brigham Young University; University of Colorado

Sherman L. Fleek is an American military historian. He was born at Hill Air Force Base and raised in Layton, Utah. His work specializes on Mormon military history, particularly the history of the Mormon Battalion during the Mexican–American War, The Mormon military experience since the founding of The Church of Jesus Christ of Latter-day Saints to modern times. He has also written on topics related to general military history, especially on the frontier and the US Army in the West. He is also a scholar and published on General Douglas MacArthur and the history of the US Military Academy having served as command historian at West Point for many years.

== Career ==
Fleek rose to the rank of Lieutenant Colonel in the United States Army, serving as an aviator, Special Forces officer, and historian in several command and staff positions. His last duty in the Army was chief historian for the National Guard Bureau in Washington D.C., before retiring in 2002. In 2005, during his service as a historian for a Civil War non-profit preservation foundation in the Shenandoah Valley in Virginia, the Army approached Fleek to enter federal civil service and become the official command historian for the United States Army reconstruction effort in Iraq. Fleek deployed to Iraq for four months in 2006, and followed that by serving as command historian of Walter Reed Army Medical Center from 2007 to 2009. In May 2009, he assumed the position as historian for the United States Military Academy at West Point. He retired from federal service in May 2023 after 43 years of combined military and civilian service.

Fleek received a bachelor's degree in English from Brigham Young University in 1982, and a master's degree in history from the University of Colorado at Colorado Springs while serving in the Army at Fort Carson. He is a Latter-day Saint and served an LDS mission in the Idaho Pocatello Mission from 1977 to 1979, after completing four years in Germany as an enlisted soldier with the Army from 1973 to 1977.

== Works ==
Books by Fleek include:

History May Be Searched in Vain: A Military History of the Mormon Battalion (414 pages, Arthur H. Clark Company) which won the Utah State History Society Amy Price Military History Award for 2007. He also wrote, Place the Headstones Where They Belong : Thomas Neibaur, WWI Soldier (Logan: Utah State University Press). Fleek has contributed many articles to Military History, America's Civil War, Wild West, Army, and Mormon Heritage Magazine.

Fleek has also wrote two historical fiction novels that focus on the Mormon Battalion and General Stephen Kearny's Army of the West during the Mexican War. The first is Called to War: Dawn of the Mormon Battalion (2010) and a sequel War in the Far West: the March of the Mormon Battalion, (2011).

In November 2011, his next book was released Saints of Valor: Mormon Medal of Honor Recipients that details the stories of Latter-day Saints who have received the Medal of Honor. A reprinted edition appeared in May 2025 with three additional Medal of Honor stories.

In March 2023, Fleek's magnus opus was published by the University of Kansas Press, The Mormon Military Experience: 1838 to the Cold War. This book was twelve years in the writing and review process. Robert Freeman Professor of Religion and Church History at Brigham Young University is the co-author who joined with Sherman Fleek in 2011 to produce this book. The book is a comprehensive history of the LDS Church's military involvement and its unique role in American military history.

In April 2024, Texas A & M University Press published MacArthur and West Point: How the General and the Academy Shaped Each Other, a narrative history of General MacArthur's relationship with West Point during his entire life.

== Valor Award ==
Sherman Fleek was awarded the U.S. Army's highest civilian decoration for bravery on May 25, 2016, by Secretary of the Army Eric K. Fanning.

=== The Award Citation ===
For heroic achievement on 31 May 2015 Mr. Sherman L. Fleek was on leave visiting a restaurant when he witnessed an armed robbery in progress. Without hesitation, he tackled and fought a man robbing the cashier at gunpoint and forced the robber to flee. His actions, which saved the lives of countless patrons and employees, exemplify the Army values of duty, selfless service, and personal courage.

== Awards and decorations ==
U.S. Military Decorations
Legion of Merit
Defense Meritorious Service Medal
Meritorious Service Medal
Joint Service Commendation Medal
Army Commendation Medal with 2 OLC
Joint Service Achievement Medal
Army Achievement Medal with OLC
Army Good Conduct Medal
U.S. Unit Awards
Joint Meritorious Unit Award
U.S. Campaign and Service Awards
National Defense Service Medal with 2 Bronze Service Stars
Global War on Terrorism Service Medal
Army Service Ribbon
Army Overseas Ribbon

Badges
Master Aviator Badge
Special Forces Tab
Parachutist Badge (United States)
Air Assault Badge
Civilian Awards
Secretary of the Army Award for Valor
Department of the Army Superior Civilian Service Award
Department of the Army Meritorious Civilian Service Award
Department of the Army Civilian Service Commendation Medal
Department of the Army Civilian Service Achievement Medal
Secretary of Defense Medal for the Global War on Terrorism

== Bibliography ==
Non-Fiction Books:

- History May be Searched in Vain: A Military History of the Mormon Battalion, Spokane, Washington: Arthur H. Clark Company, 2006. ISBN 0-870-62343-5, OCLC 62172752
- Place the Headstones Where They Belong: Thomas Neibaur, WWI Soldier, Logan: Utah State University Press, 2008. ISBN 0-874-21695-8: Reprint, Fort Fleek 2025.
- Saints of Valor: Mormon Medal of Honor Recipients, Greg Kofford Books, 2011. ISBN 978-1-58958-171-5 Expanded Edition Fort Fleek, 2025.
- The Mormon Military Experience: 1838 to the Cold War, Lawrence: University of Kansas Press, 2023. ISBN 0700634320
- MacArthur and West Point: How the General and the Academy Shaped Each Other, College Station: Texas A & M University Press, 2024. ISBN 9781648431890
- Latter-day Saints at West Point: A Sesquicentennial Story 1875-2025, Fort Fleek, 2025. ISBN 9781611662405

Novels:

- Called to War: Dawn of the Mormon Battalion. 2010 ISBN 1-934-53749-7
- War in the Far West: The March of the Mormon Battalion, 2011 ISBN 1-934-53799-3

== See also ==
- Mormon Battalion
- Utah War
- Latter Day Saint Historians

== Sources ==
- BYU Magazine Spring 2007
- this article by Kenneth Godfrey contains a reference to an article by Fleek in the footnote
- BYU Conference to Salute LDS Veterans Mormon Times, Nov 3, 2011
- 10 "Mormons among Medal of Honor Recipients", Mormon Times, May 24, 2012
- army.mil 26 May 2016.
