= Hans K. Ziegler =

German-American physicist

Hans Karl Ziegler
- Born: March 1, 1911; Munich, German Empire
- Died: December 11, 1999 (aged 88); Colts Neck Township, New Jersey, United States
- Resting place: Saint Gabriel’s Cemetery and Mausoleum, Marlboro, New Jersey, United States
- Citizenship: Germany (1911–1954); United States (1954–1999)
- Education: Technical University of Munich (Dipl.-Ing., Dr.-Ing.)
- Known for: Development of communication satellites; introduction of photovoltaic systems for spacecraft; early advocacy of solar power
- Spouse: Friederike Ziegler (d. 1996)
- Children: Christine Griffith; Friederike Meindl; Hans Ziegler Jr.
- Awards: Meritorious Civilian Service Award (1963); Decoration for Exceptional Civilian Service (1977); IEEE Fellow; Fellow of the New York Academy of Sciences
- Scientific career
- Fields: Electrical engineering; Satellite communications; Photovoltaics
- Workplaces: Rosenthal (company); Fort Monmouth (Signal Corps Laboratories / Electronics Command)

Hans Karl Ziegler (March 1, 1911 – December 11, 1999) was a German-American engineer and physicist who was a pioneer in the development of communication satellites and the use of photovoltaic solar cells to power space satellites. A native of Germany, he served as a research leader during World War II and later immigrated to the United States under Operation Paperclip, becoming a key figure in early American space and military electronics programs. Ziegler spent three decades at the U.S. Army Signal Corps laboratories (later Electronics Command) at Fort Monmouth, New Jersey, ultimately rising to the position of Chief Scientist and Technical Director of the Army’s electronics research and development laboratory. He played a crucial role in introducing solar power for spacecraft, earning the moniker "father of spacecraft solar power" for his early advocacy of solar energy in satellites. Ziegler received several prestigious awards for his work, including the Army’s Exceptional Civilian Service Award.

== Personal life and education ==
Ziegler was born on March 1, 1911, in Munich, Germany. He attended the Technische Hochschule (Technical University of Munich), where he studied electrical engineering and earned his doctorate (Ph.D.) in 1936. After receiving his degrees, Ziegler remained in academia as an Wissenschaftlicher Assistent (scientific assistant), roughly equivalent to an assistant professor of electrical engineering. During this period, he also conducted research in German industry, developing expertise in ceramic insulators for high-voltage power transmission lines.

Ziegler was married to Friederike Ziegler, and the couple had three children: two daughters, Christine and Friederike, and a son, Hans Jr. Ziegler’s wife Friederike predeceased him in 1996. In his later years, Ziegler lived in Colts Neck Township, New Jersey, not far from the Fort Monmouth research facilities where he had spent much of his career. He died in Colts Neck on December 11, 1999, at the age of 88. He was survived by his three children.

== World War II ==
=== German career ===
In the late 1930s, Ziegler transitioned from academia to industry and took on a research role that became closely tied to Germany’s wartime efforts. He worked for the Rosenthal company in Selb, Bavaria, which produced high-tension porcelain components, and during World War II he was put in charge of the firm’s research and development department. In this capacity, Ziegler’s work shifted toward military electronics for the Wehrmacht and Luftwaffe. His projects included developing electronic fuzes for bombs, shells, and mines, as well as other communications and electronic systems needed by the German military.

=== Operation Paperclip and Move to the U.S. ===
After World War II, Ziegler was invited by the U.S. government to emigrate to the United States as part of Operation Paperclip, the secret program to recruit German scientists and engineers. In March 1947, he arrived in America alongside Wernher von Braun and other members of the German rocket team. Ziegler was assigned to the U.S. Army Signal Corps Laboratories at Fort Monmouth in New Jersey, where his expertise in electronics was applied to American research programs. Like many Paperclip scientists, he had to adjust to a new environment; colleagues noted that Ziegler quickly ingratiated himself with key figures at Fort Monmouth and even became an informal spokesman for the German scientists there. He became a naturalized citizen of the United States in 1954.

At Fort Monmouth’s Signal Corps laboratories (later reorganized as the U.S. Army Electronics Command), Ziegler’s career flourished. For the first several years, he served as a Scientific Consultant in the lab’s Electronic Components research division, making significant contributions in the fields of energy generation and conversion and electronic components researchethw.org. In the mid-1950s, as the United States intensified its efforts in space and missile technology, Ziegler was tapped to guide the Signal Corps’ nascent space electronics program. In 1955 he was assigned to the Office of the Director of Research to oversee projects in space electronics and geophysics, integrating satellite-related research into the lab’s activities.

== Contributions to Space Electronics ==
In 1956, Ziegler was promoted to Assistant Director of Research at Fort Monmouth, expanding his oversight to include research in meteorology and advanced electronic components. As the Space Race began, he became one of the Army’s leading innovators in satellite technology. In late 1958, Ziegler was appointed director of the newly established Astro-Electronics Division of the Signal Corps laboratories. Under his leadership, the Army Signal Corps produced several groundbreaking contributions to early space exploration:

- Solar-powered satellites: Ziegler’s team developed the first solar electric power supply for a satellite. He was instrumental in ensuring that Vanguard 1 – launched in March 1958 as part of the Naval Research Laboratory’s Project Vanguard – carried solar cells on board. Over Navy skepticism about the new technology, Ziegler persistently advocated for photovoltaic power; Vanguard 1 ended up equipped with four small solar cell panels that recharged its batteries. The satellite became the world’s first spacecraft powered by solar energy, and its instruments, powered by the sun, operated successfully for over seven yearsg. This achievement proved the viability of solar photovoltaics in space and established solar panels as the standard power source for satellites thereafter.
- Communications satellites: Ziegler also contributed to the design of the first communications satellite. His division at Fort Monmouth developed the electronic communications payload for Project SCORE (Signal Communications by Orbiting Relay Equipment). Launched in December 1958, SCORE was the world’s first communications satellite, relaying a recorded message from President Eisenhower. Ziegler’s work on SCORE’s equipment helped demonstrate the concept of using orbiting vehicles to send messages across the globe.
- Weather and science satellites: The Signal Corps under Ziegler provided key instrumentation for early scientific satellites. His team built the cloud cover imaging electronic package flown on Explorer 7 (1959 Alpha) and contributed to the TIROS-1 weather satellite launched in 1960. Ziegler himself served as a Defense Department delegate to the International Geophysical Year (IGY) meetings; he was part of the U.S. delegation to the Fifth CSAGI conference in Moscow in 1958 during the IGY, sharing expertise as satellites began to be used for scientific research. In 1964, he also advised on U.S. scientific activities in Antarctica (at the South Pole station) under the National Science Foundation’s direction.

Ziegler’s foresight in applying solar power to space systems was particularly influential. After examining Bell Laboratories’ new silicon solar cells in May 1954, he immediately recognized their potential for aerospace use. In a 1954 report, he wrote that the silicon solar cell “may well render [itself] into an important source of electrical power” and noted that if all building rooftops were equipped with solar cells, they could generate enough electricity to meet the country’s power needs. The following year, in September 1955, Ziegler famously told Major General James Dunne O'Connell, the head of the Signal Corps, that “in the long run, mankind has no choice but to turn to the sun if it wants to survive”. His persistent advocacy for photovoltaic power led directly to the solar-enabled Vanguard and Explorer satellites, validating the concept.

== Chief Scientist and Later Career ==
On August 1, 1959, Ziegler was formally appointed Chief Scientist of the U.S. Army Signal Research and Development Laboratory at Fort Monmouth, succeeding Dr. Harold Zahl in the lab’s top scientific post. In this role, he oversaw all research initiatives of the laboratory during a critical period of technological growth spurred by the Space Race. When the U.S. Army reorganized its R&D structure in 1962–63, creating the Electronics Command (ECOM) under Army Materiel Command, Ziegler was appointed Deputy for Science and Chief Scientist of the new U.S. Army Electronics Command in 1963. He continued to guide Army research in communications, radar, and electronic devices through the 1960s. In 1971, Ziegler became Director of the U.S. Army Electronics Technology and Devices Laboratory (ETDL), a position he held until his retirement in 1977. As director of ETDL, he managed advanced research in electronics and materials, including semiconductor technology and emerging innovations that would impact military communications and computing equipment.

Throughout his U.S. career, Ziegler was a prolific contributor to scientific literature and a leader in professional circles. He published numerous technical papers and held several patents related to electronics and satellite technology. Ziegler was elected a Fellow of the IEEE (Institute of Electrical and Electronics Engineers) for his achievements, and he was also named a fellow of the American Academy of Science. He served as president of the Fort Monmouth chapter of the Armed Forces Communications and Electronics Association in 1960–61, fostering collaboration between military labs and industry.

== Legacy and Honors ==
Ziegler received numerous awards for his work. In 1963, the U.S. Department of Defense honored him with the Meritorious Civilian Service Award, recognizing him as a “world pioneer in communications satellites and solar energy systems to power satellites”. Upon his retirement in 1977, Ziegler was awarded the Army’s highest civilian decoration, the Decoration for Exceptional Civilian Service, for his outstanding contributions over three decades. In addition to his IEEE Fellowship, Ziegler was active in scholarly societies and was a member of the New York Academy of Sciences and other professional organizations.

== See also ==
- Operation Paperclip – the U.S. program that brought Ziegler and other German scientists to America after World War II
- Vanguard 1 – the 1958 satellite that became the first to use solar cells, due in part to Ziegler’s initiative
- Photovoltaic System – solar cell technology that Ziegler helped introduce into spacecraft applications
- Communications satellite – Ziegler contributed to early development of satellite communications (e.g. Project SCORE)
