= Meritorious Public Service Medal =

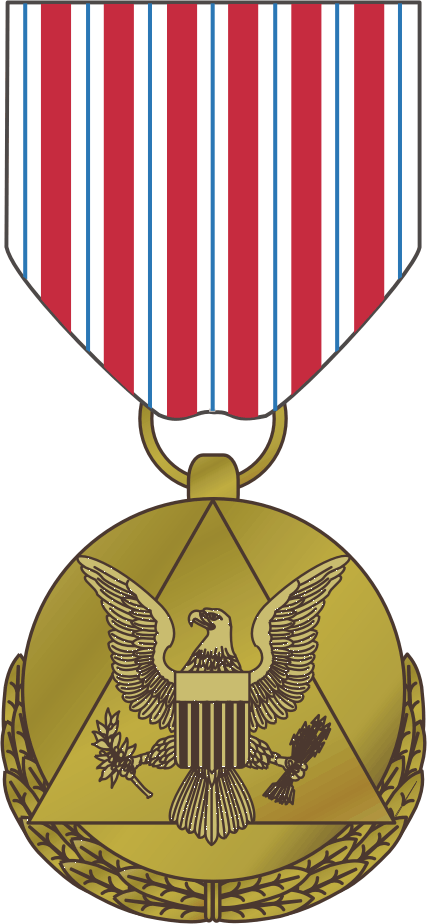
- Meritorious Public Service Medal
- Type: Civil award
- Awarded for: Outstanding service that makes a substantial contribution or is of significance to the Army or to a major Army command
- Country: United States
- Presented by: Department of the Army
- Eligibility: any Federal Government officials at the policy development level, and technical personnel who serve the Army in an advisory capacity or as consultants.
- Established: January 1959
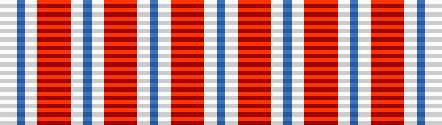
- Ribbon of the medal

Precedence
- Next (higher): Superior Public Service Medal
- Equivalent: Department of the Army Superior Civilian Service Award
- Next (lower): Public Service Commendation Medal

The Meritorious Public Service Medal formerly the Outstanding Civilian Service Award is the third highest honor within the public service awards scheme of the Department of the Army that can be awarded to a private citizen.

== Eligibility ==
The Secretary of the Army or a major commander may award this medal to eligible recipients, including civilians not employed by the Army or Army contractors (who are eligible for Army honorary awards), military personnel, Federal Government officials at the policy development level, and technical personnel who serve the Army in an advisory capacity or as consultant, for "outstanding service that makes a substantial contribution or is of significance to the Major Command concerned."

== Criteria ==
The Secretary of the Army or a major commander may award this medal for outstanding service that makes a substantial contribution or is of significance to the major Army command concerned. Commanders of Major Army commands may delegate approval authority for this award to any commander in the rank of Major General or above.

== Appearance ==
The Meritorious Public Service Medal is a bronze disc 1 9/16 in (40 mm) in height and 1 7/16 in (37 mm) in width. On the obverse is an equilateral triangle symbolic of the civilian. Superimposed on the triangle is the eagle from the Great Seal of the United States. At the base of the medal is a wreath denoting nonmilitary service. The reverse of the medal is inscribed AWARDED TO and FOR MERITORIOUS PUBLIC SERVICE TO THE UNITED STATES ARMY.

The medal is suspended by a ribbon 1 3/8 in (35 mm) in width consisting of 13 alternating stripes equally spaced, seven white and six red. Centered on each white stripe is an oriental blue stripe 1/64 in (0.40 mm) wide.

== Notable recipients ==
- Forrest W. "Bo" Wood - Instrumental in the development of Illinois flood control program
- William Atwater - author and former Director of the United States Army Ordnance Museum
- BG Albert Bryant Jr., USA (Ret.)
- E.N.J. Carter - creator of the "Be All You Can Be" slogan
- Stephen Colbert - TV talk show host for his continued support of U.S. troops
- Paul Fiset, M.D., Ph.D. - Armed Forces Epidemiological Board 1965–1976 and consultant to the Surgeon General
- SMA Richard A. Kidd, USA (Ret.) - former Sergeant Major of the Army
- Captain David Minard, M.D., Ph.D., M.P.H., MC USN - Mercury Seven heat stress physiologist for Project Mercury
- Audie Murphy - most decorated US Army soldier in World War II
- Francis Joseph Murray - Mathematician known for his foundational work on functional analysis
- Mark Pfeifle - former Deputy National Security Advisor for Strategic Communications and Global Outreach under President George W. Bush.
- Elihu Rose - military historian
- Bud Selig - former Commissioner of Major League Baseball for MLB's support of veterans and their families.
- Gary Sinise - Hon. CPO, USN - for substantial contributions to the U.S. Army community through his work with the Gary Sinise Foundation
- Emil Skodon - former United States Ambassador to Brunei and a career foreign service officer
- Jay Luvaas – military historian
- Brian E. Kinsella - Veteran and founder of Stop Soldier Suicide

== See also ==
- Department of the Army Civilian Awards
- Awards and decorations of the United States government
