= Air and Space Outstanding Unit Award =

United States Air Force and United States Space Force military unit decoration

- Outstanding Unit Award ribbon Ribbon with "V" Device (discontinued 1 January 2014)
- Type: Ribbon and Streamer
- Awarded for: Exceptionally meritorious service, accomplishes specific acts of outstanding achievement, excels in combat operations against an armed enemy of the United States, or conducts with distinct military operations involving conflict with, or exposure to, a hostile action by any opposing foreign force
- Presented by: the Department of the Air Force
- Eligibility: Air Force, Air Force Reserve, and Air National Guard units
- Status: Currently awarded
- First award: 1954
- Final award: Ongoing
- Streamer

Precedence
- Next (higher): Army, Naval Service, and Coast Guard: Meritorious Unit Commendation; Air and Space Forces: Meritorious Unit Award
- Equivalent: Army: Superior Unit Award
- Next (lower): Naval Service: Navy "E" Ribbon; Air and Space Forces: Air and Space Organizational Excellence Award; Coast Guard: Coast Guard "E" Ribbon

The Air and Space Outstanding Unit Award (ASOUA) is one of the unit awards of the United States Air Force and United States Space Force. It was established in 1954 as the Air Force Outstanding Unit Award and was the first independent Air Force decoration created (to this point, Air Force personnel were routinely awarded Army decorations). The Air Force Longevity Service Award would follow in 1957 with most of the standard Air Force awards (including the Air Force Good Conduct Medal) established in the early to mid 1960s.

The Outstanding Unit Award is awarded to any unit of the U.S. Air Force (including the Air Force Reserve and the Air National Guard) which performs exceptionally meritorious service, accomplishes specific acts of outstanding achievement, excels in combat operations against an armed enemy of the United States, or conducts with distinct military operations involving conflict with, or exposure to, a hostile action by any opposing foreign force.

Multiple awards of the Outstanding Unit Award are denoted by bronze oak leaf clusters, and silver oak leaf clusters, as applicable, on the ribbon.

Until 2004, the Outstanding Unit Award was the senior most unit award in the U.S. Air Force. It now ranks directly below the Meritorious Unit Award, which was established in March 2004, and above the Air Force Organizational Excellence Award in the precedence of Air Force awards and decorations. It is awarded to personnel who were assigned or attached to the unit receiving the award during the period it was awarded for. Non-USAF personnel (e.g., USN, USMC, USCG) personnel assigned to USAF units awarded the Outstanding Unit Award are also eligible to wear the ribbon on their uniforms. However, the ribbon does not come in the larger size of unit awards common to the U.S. Army.

On 16 November 2020, the Air Force Outstanding Unit Award was renamed the Air and Space Outstanding Unit Award by the Secretary of the Air Force.

== Notable recipients ==
- George W. Bush: US President
