= William Atwater =

William Atwater may refer to:

- William Atwater (curator) (born 1945), author and former director of the United States Army Ordnance Museum, Aberdeen, Maryland, United States
- William Atwater (bishop) (1440–1521), English churchman and Bishop of Lincoln
