= Department of the Army Civilian Awards =

Awards in the US Department of the Army

The United States Department of the Army offers a variety of awards, decorations and incentive programs to honor and recognize the contribution and efforts of its civilian workforce. Department of the Army civilian awards are governed by Army Regulation 672–20 Decorations, Awards, and Honors Incentive Awards.

There are three categories of recognition: monetary, honorary, and time-off.

== Superior accomplishment awards ==
- Special Act or Service Award – A SASA is a cash award given to recognize a meritorious personal effort, act, service, scientific or other achievement accomplished within or outside assigned job responsibilities. All appropriated fund employees are eligible for this award. Cash awards range from $25 to $25,000, depending on the achievement being recognized. (An additional award exceeding $25,000 may be approved at the direction of the President.)
- On-the-Spot Cash Award – The OTS cash award is a small SASA ($25 to $500) which may be given by a supervisor for day to day accomplishments of subordinate employees.
- Time Off Award – Employees may be granted up to 80 hours of time off during a leave year without charge to leave or loss of pay as an award for achievements or performance contributing to the Army mission.
- Performance Award – A performance award is a monetary award given in recognition of high-level performance for a specific period. This award is used to recognize all appropriated fund employees, except Senior Executive Service (SES) employees. Performance awards will be computed as a percentage of pay with a maximum award of 10 percent of the employee’s base pay.

== Valorous awards ==
The Secretary of the Army Award for Valor is awarded for acts of heroism or bravery connected with an Army employee or Army activity, or that in some way benefits the Army. Recipients will have distinguished themselves by exhibiting great courage or sacrifice involving heroism or bravery. The performance of the act must be a voluntary action above and beyond the call of duty. The act may be recognized if it is connected with an Army employee or Army activity, or if the Army in some way benefits from the act. Awards will be made only to recognize single acts of heroism or bravery. This award is not presented in recognition of activities or conflict with an armed enemy. The situation must have involved personal hazard or danger and the voluntary risk of life. Awards are not made solely for saving a life.

Secretary of the Army Award for Valor

== Honorary awards ==
Honorary awards are intended to be presented to Department of the Army civilian employees in recognition of noteworthy accomplishments. Honorary awards may be given to civilian employees at any time in their careers, including occasions such as retirement, reassignment, transfer, or separation, provided the individual’s accomplishments fully meet the criteria for the particular award.

Medals (in order of precedence)

- Distinguished Civilian Service Medal
- Superior Civilian Service Medal (formerly known as the Meritorious Civilian Service Medal)
- Meritorious Civilian Service Medal (formerly known as the Superior Civilian Service Medal)
- Civilian Service Commendation Medal (formerly known as the Commander's Award for Civilian Service)
- Civilian Service Achievement Medal
- Civilian Award for Humanitarian Service
- Armed Forces Civilian Service Medal
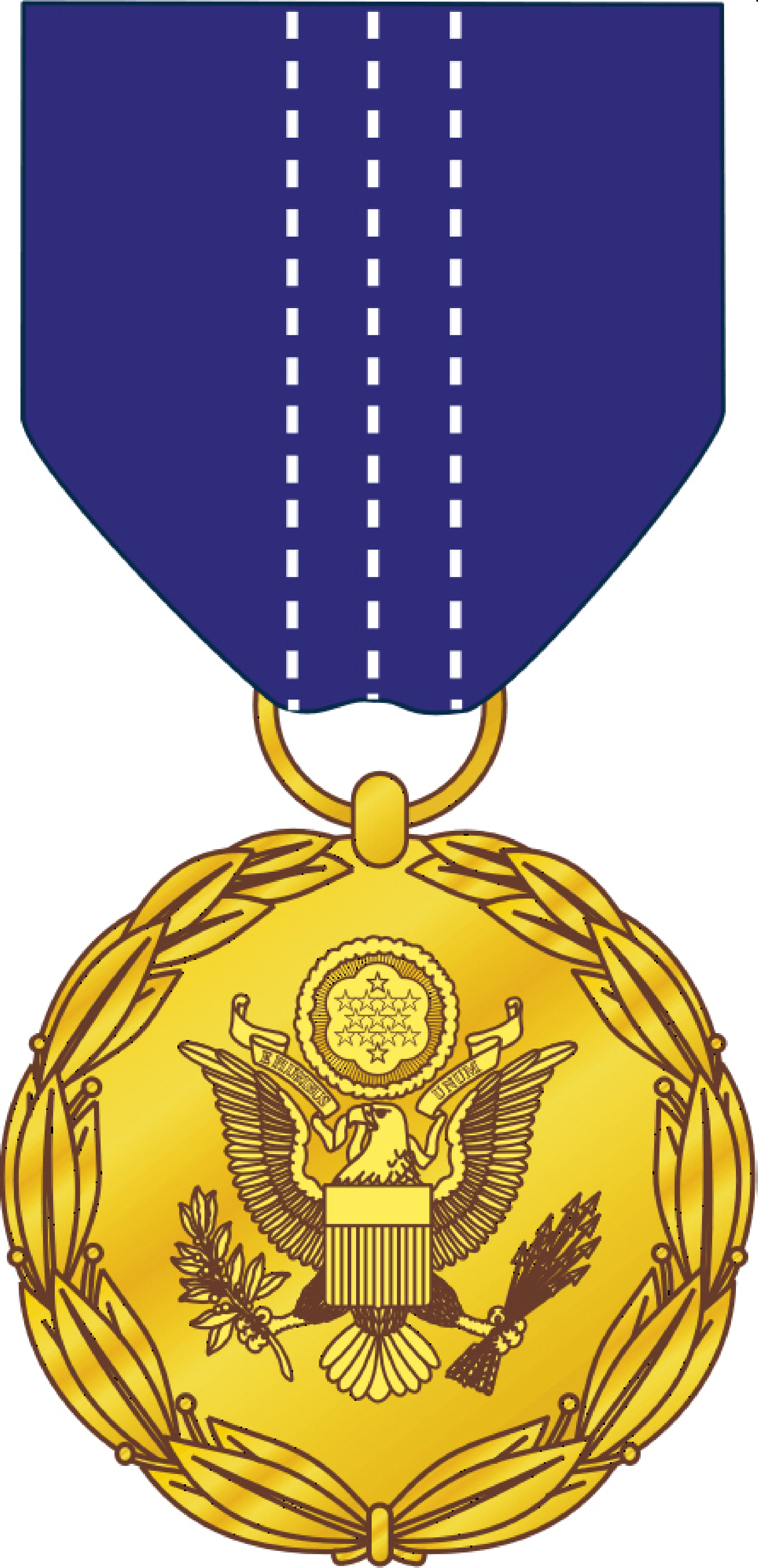
Distinguished Civilian Service Medal

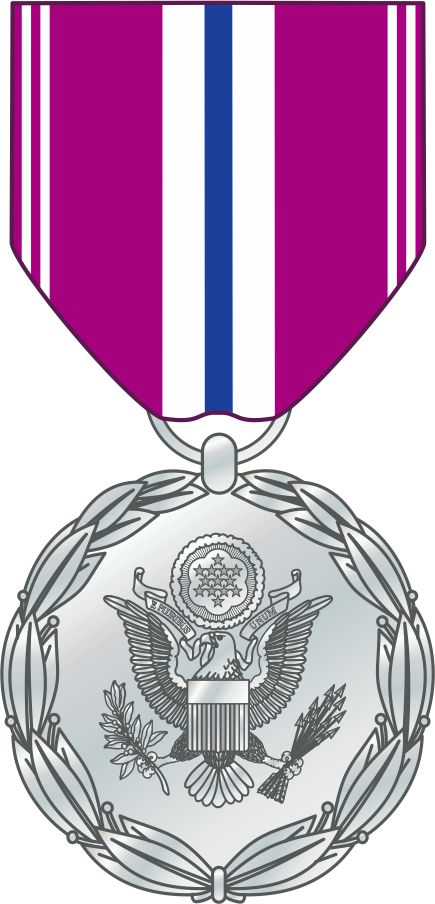
Superior Civilian Service Medal

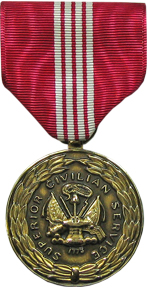
Meritorious Civilian Service Medal

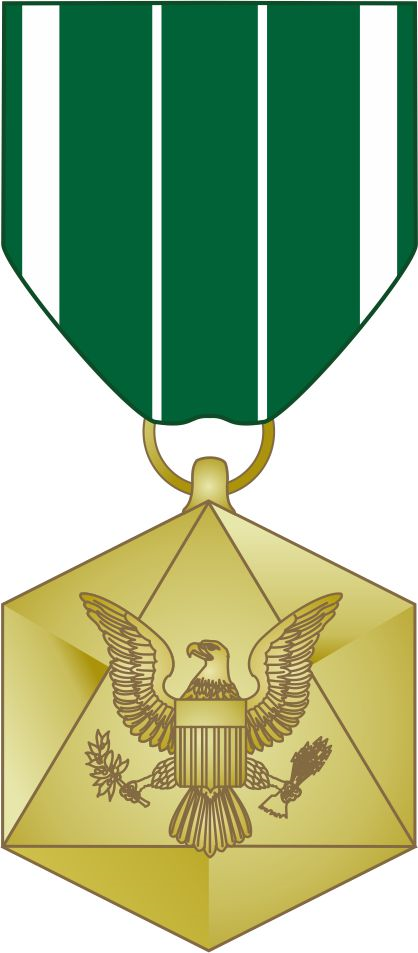
Civilian Service Commendation Medal

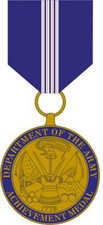
Civilian Service Achievement Medal

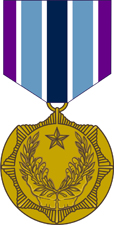
Civilian Award for Humanitarian Service

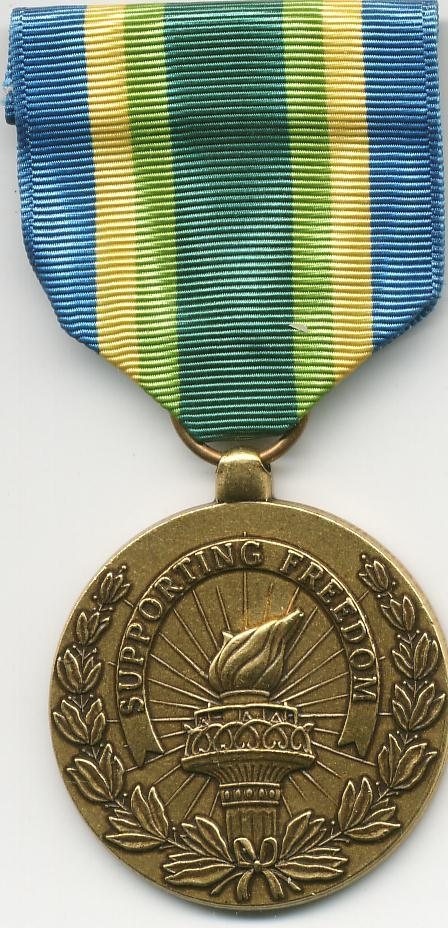
Armed Forces Civilian Service Medal

Other Department of the Army honorary awards for civilian federal employees

- Patriotic Public Service Lapel Pin
- Certificate of Achievement
- Commendation Certificate
- Certificate of Appreciation
- Secretary of the Army Award for Outstanding Achievement in Materiel Acquisition
- Department of the Army Certificate of Promotion
- Award for Outstanding Service in the Army Senior Executive Service
- Awards for Outstanding Service in a Senior Level or Senior Scientific and Professional Position

== Public service awards ==
Awards for public service may be awarded to persons or groups who are not employed by the Army. Presidential appointees and non-career senior Army officials are eligible for these awards. Army civilian employees who are eligible for Army honorary awards, military personnel, and Army contractors are ineligible. These awards are in hierarchical order from the highest to the lowest.

- Distinguished Public Service Medal
- Superior Public Service Medal
- Meritorious Public Service Medal
- Public Service Commendation Medal
- Patriotic Public Service Lapel Pin
- Civilian Award for Humanitarian Service
- Certificate of Appreciation
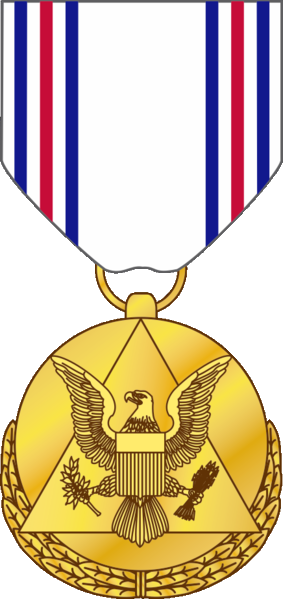
Distinguished Public Service Medal

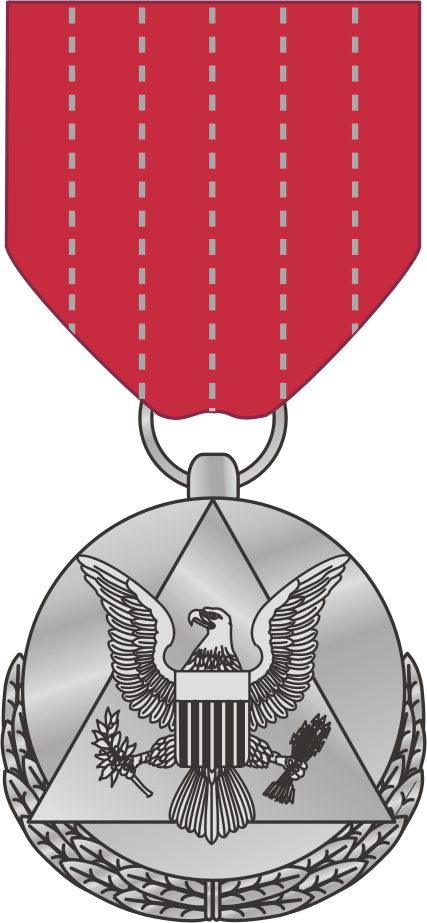
Superior Public Service Medal

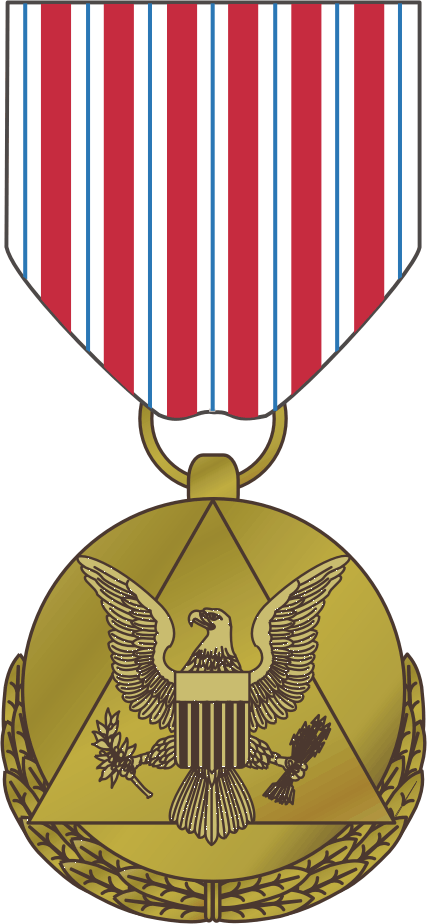
Meritorious Public Service Medal

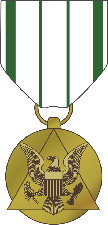
Public Service Commendation Medal

== See also ==
- Awards and decorations of the United States government
- Civilians serving one year or longer with the Headquarters, Department of the Army (and specified other positions) are eligible to receive and wear the Army Staff Lapel Pin, a version of the Army Staff Identification Badge.
- Civilians serving in an Army unit when the unit is decorated with the Army Superior Unit Award may wear a lapel pin version of that award permanently. Civilians serving in a unit that has been decorated before their tenure are authorized to wear the lapel pin during their employment with the decorated unit.
