= Brian E. Kinsella =

American veteran and entrepreneur

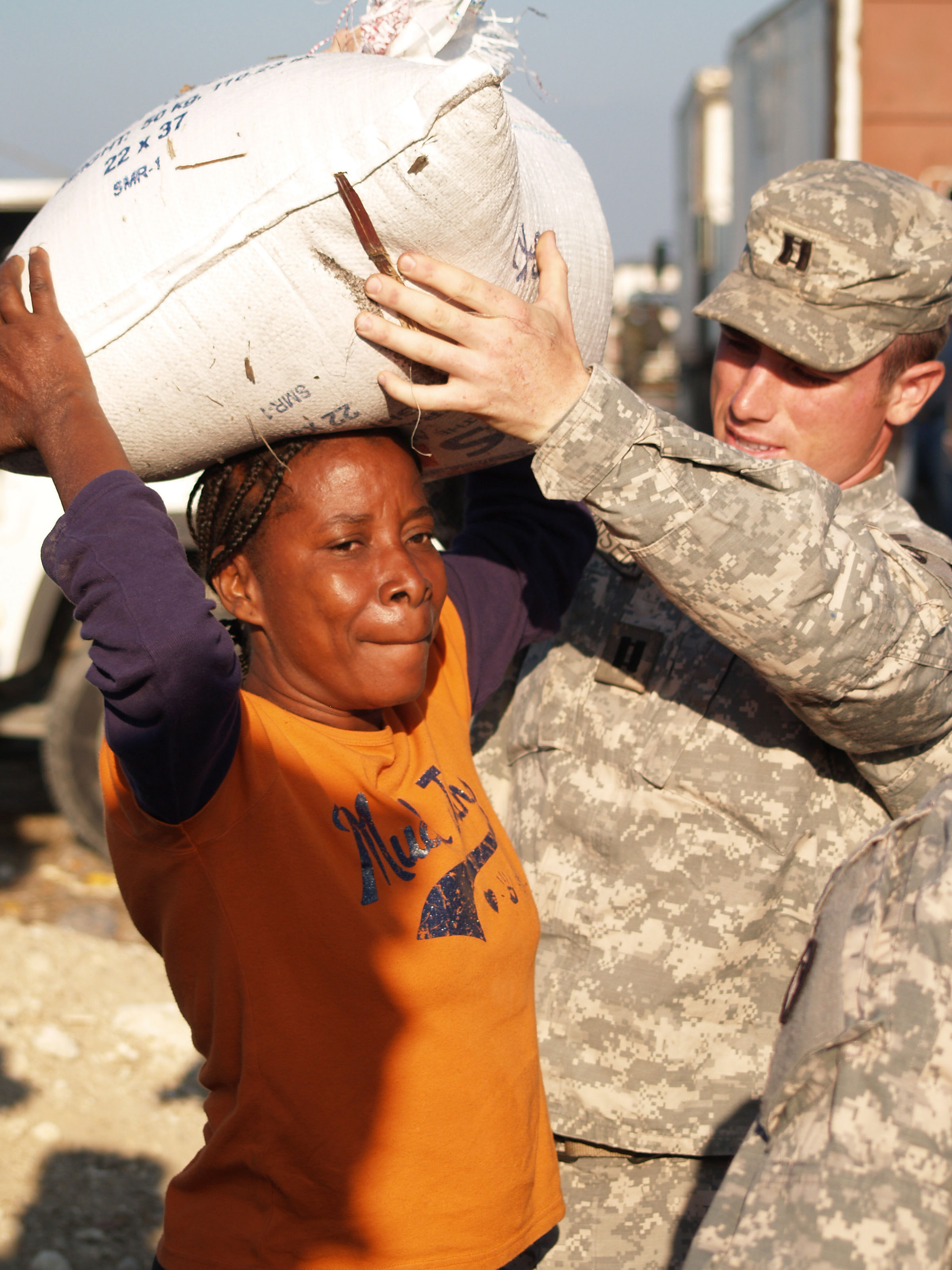
- Kinsella in Haiti in 2010
- Born: 1983 (age 42–43); New Jersey, United States
- Allegiance: United States
- Branch: United States Army
- Rank: Captain
- Awards: Meritorious Public Service Medal
- Education: Johns Hopkins University (BA)

Brian E. Kinsella (born 1983) is an American veteran, entrepreneur, and former financial analyst. He is an advocate for military and veterans' mental health, as well as suicide prevention initiatives in the United States.

He served as an active-duty U.S. Army Officer, attaining the rank of captain and is a recipient of the Meritorious Public Service Medal for his dedication and support to the Army.

He co-founded the nonprofit organization Stop Soldier Suicide.

== Early life and education ==
Kinsella spent his childhood in Howell Township, New Jersey. He completed his Bachelor of Arts degree at Johns Hopkins University, where he was recognized as a distinguished military graduate of the University's Reserve Officers' Training Corps program (ROTC). During his second year at Johns Hopkins University, one of Kinsella's housemates was stabbed by an intruder and succumbed of his injuries.

== Career ==
=== Military career ===
Kinsella served in the U.S. Army in Baghdad, Iraq, as a captain and detachment commander during Operation Iraqi Freedom.

He also served in Port-au-Prince, Haiti, where he played a key role with the Commanding General of the 3rd Expeditionary Sustainment Command (XVIII Airborne Corps) and the Global Response Force (GRF), and US Southern Command during Operation Unified Response after the 2010 earthquake. While in Port-au-Prince, Kinsella acted as the liaison between Staff sergeant Theirry Alexandre, the State Department, and the Department of Defense to expedite the departure of Alexandre's daughter, who was trapped in Haiti.

After his service ended, Kinsella co-founded the non-profit organization Stop Soldier Suicide.

=== Career in financial services ===
In 2010, subsequent to his military service, Kinsella transitioned into the finance sector, working as a financial analyst at BNP Paribas. He later joined Goldman Sachs in 2013, focusing on the energy sector. Upon concluding his tenure at Goldman Sachs in 2018, Kinsella increased his involvement in aiding veterans grappling with post-service challenges, particularly focusing on mental health issues.

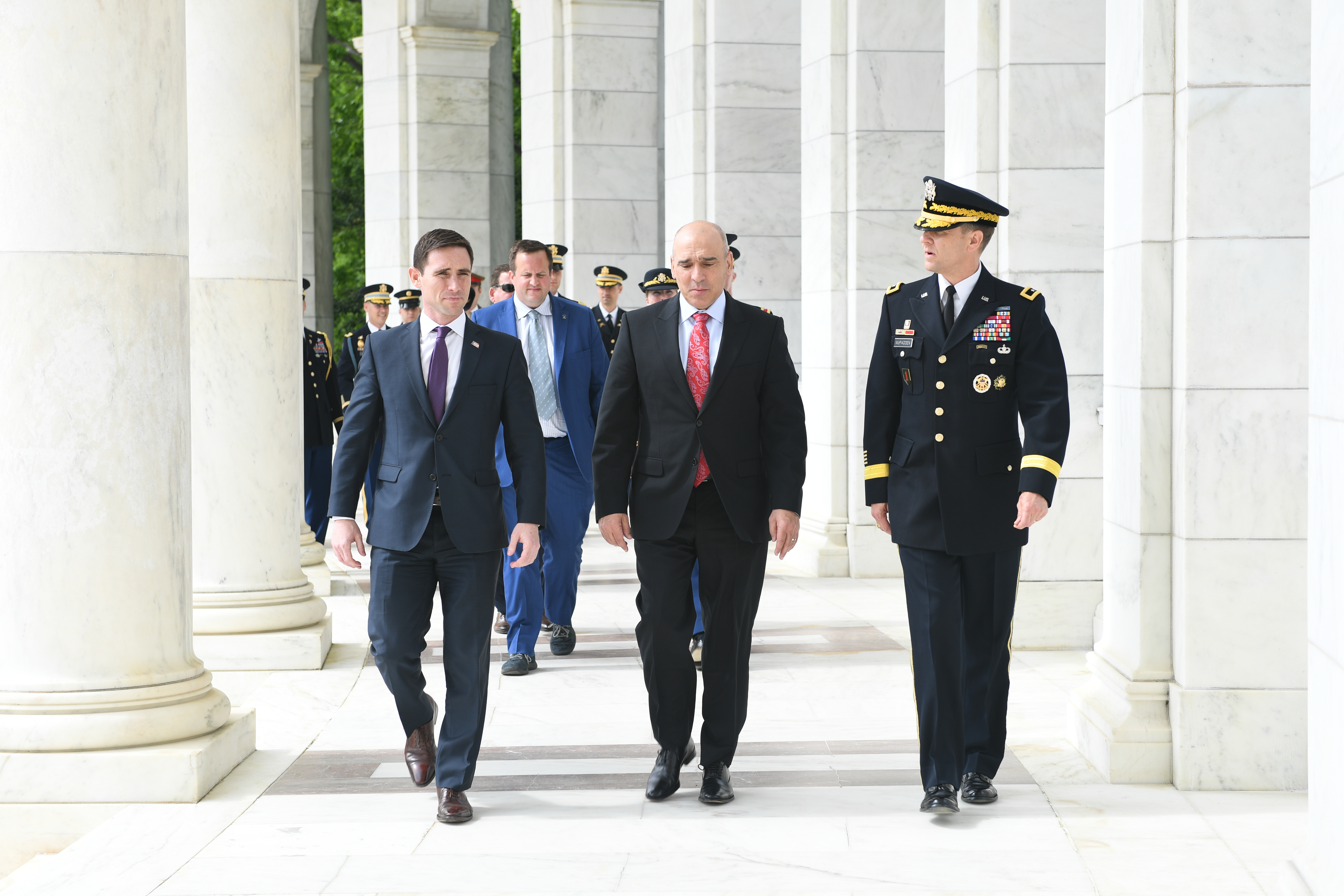
Chief of Staff of the U.S. Army Gen. Mark A. Milley, hosts the Salute from the Chief event for Dr. Anthony Hassan and Brian Kinsella in the National Capitol Region, April 25, 2019

=== Nonprofit, mental healthcare and veteran advocacy ===
During the years from 2010 to 2017, Kinsella volunteered to serve as chief executive officer for Stop Soldier Suicide and continues to serve as Chairman of the board on a volunteer basis.

Kinsella co-founded Stop Soldier Suicide (SSS), headquartered in Durham, North Carolina, in 2010 with co-founders Nick Black and Craig Gridelli, who also served in the military. This organization provides veterans with resources to cope with PTSD, financial difficulties, and housing challenges, ultimately striving to reduce the rate of Veteran suicides.

Among groundbreaking initiatives is the Black Box Project, employing forensic software to retrospectively study the digital activities of deceased service members' cellphones and computers, which provide valuable behavioral insights used for potential preventive measures. The Black Box Project has recently gained more attention, due to the positive effects it has had in preventing suicides within the military veteran community by detecting signs of suicidal thoughts earlier.

Other initiatives Kinsella has undertaken to raise awareness, include the "Ride for Life" campaign in 2012, where he motorcycle-toured to U.S. military bases across the country. Additionally, in 2013, he organized the "Night for Life" event on the USS Intrepid, a fundraiser for veteran causes, in collaboration with veterans, Wall Street firms, and Derek Wallis. The "Night for Life" event was held again in 2014 and 2016.

Other involvement for veteran awareness include a public endorsement and hosting a screening for the Emmy Award-nominated documentary (2018): Almost Sunrise, in 2016.

In August 2021, amid the fall of the Afghan government and the subsequent withdrawal of U.S. troops, followed by the resurgence of the Taliban, Kinsella volunteered in the Commercial Task Force group of volunteer civilians, aiding the evacuation of high-risk Afghans, including American citizens stranded in the country.

Kinsella undertook the role of managing lists of hundreds of individuals from the Peacock Lounge at the Willard InterContinental in Washington, D.C. Combined total efforts culminated in the evacuation of as many as 5,000 evacuees from Kabul.

== Honors and awards ==
In recognition of his service and dedication, Kinsella was awarded the Meritorious Public Service Medal by the Chief of Staff of the U.S. Army, Mark A. Milley, on April 25, 2019.
