= E. N. J. Carter =

American novelist

E. N. J. Carter (the pen name for Earl Carter) was an American novelist and advertising copywriter.

Carter was born at St. Vincent's Hospital in Greenwich Village. He was awarded the Outstanding Civilian Service Medal in 2003 by the U.S. Army for creating the slogan "Be All You Can Be." The award read in part, "Your slogan and creative advertising strategies were featured in song lyrics, television, and radio and print advertising for nearly two decades." Carter's original concept sheet, with the words "Be All You Can Be," is now part of a permanent collection at the U.S. Army Heritage Center Foundation.

In 2005, Carter published his first novel The Other President. Carter has several e-books on Kindle, including The President Series, Doo-Wop Dreams, and The Persuasive Copywriter.

Carter has taught advertising at The School of Visual Arts, Pratt Institute, and Syracuse University.
