= William Atwater (curator) =

American historian (born 1945)

William F. Atwater
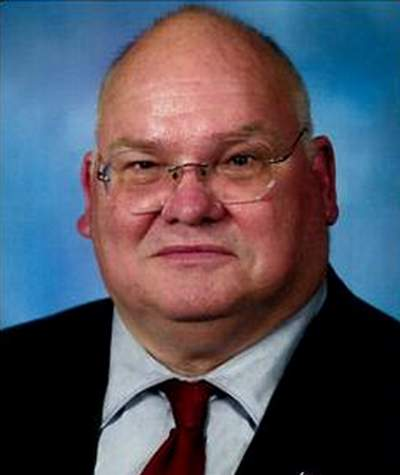
- Born: William Felix Atwater; November 12, 1945 (age 80); Dallas, Texas, U.S.
- Education: Berea College (BA); Duke University (MA, PhD)
- Occupations: Military technology expert, author, museum curator, TV personality
- Awards: Outstanding Civilian Service Award; Commander's Award for Public Service
- Military career
- Allegiance: United States
- Branch: United States Marine Corps
- Rank: Captain
- Unit: 1st Battalion, 7th Marines
- Conflicts: Vietnam War
- Awards: Purple Heart; Navy Commendation Medal; Vietnamese Cross of Gallantry

William Felix Atwater (born November 12, 1945) is an American author and former director of the United States Army Ordnance Museum in Aberdeen, Maryland. Atwater is also a frequent guest contributor to a variety of television programs that draw on his expertise in military weaponry.

== Early life ==
William F. Atwater was born on November 12, 1945, in Dallas, Texas. He graduated from Berea College in Berea, Kentucky, in 1968 and received a Bachelor of Arts degree in history and political science. Following a decade of service in the U.S. military, he attended Duke University where he was awarded a Master of Arts in Military History in 1984 and a Ph.D in military history in 1985. His nickname was Jack.

== Career ==
Upon graduation from Berea College, Atwater was commissioned as a lieutenant in the Marines. He commanded a rifle platoon and later a company in the 1st Battalion, 7th Marine Regiment, 1st Marine Division, during the Vietnam War where he received the Purple Heart, a Navy Commendation Medal, and a Vietnamese Cross of Gallantry. In a 2007 interview with the television documentary Weaponology, he recounted how his company were trapped in a "hot" LZ until rescued by a flight of AH-1 Cobra gunships. Promoted to captain, he served all over the world in various assignments and attended numerous military schools during a ten-year career in the Marine Corps. In 1985, after earning his Doctorate from Duke, William Atwater assumed the directorship of the 101st Airborne/Air Assault Divisional Museum at Fort Campbell, Kentucky, a position he held until 1989. From 1989 to November, 2007, he served as Director of the United States Army Ordnance Museum, then located at Aberdeen Proving Ground in Maryland. While Director at the Ordnance Museum he was instrumental in the refurbishment and rebuilding of large artifacts like tanks and artillery to meet EPA standards, and the construction of a climate-controlled warehouse to store the museum's collection of small arms. In addition to his work for the museum, William Atwater was often called upon as a guest lecturer and speaker at West Point Military Academy, the Defense Intelligence College, National Security Agency, and the Central Intelligence Agency.

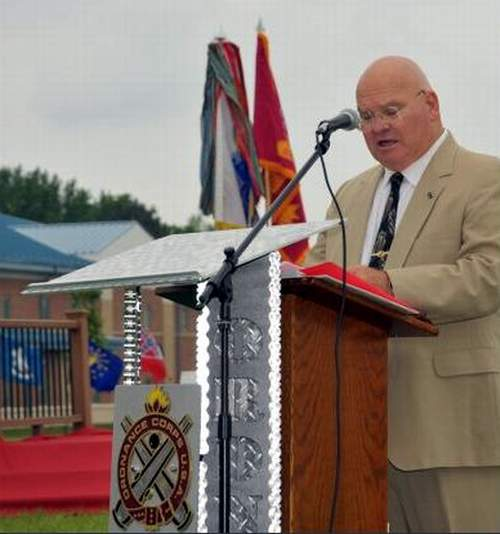
Atwater speaking at the dedication of a new Army Ordnance Corps parade ground in 2012

Atwater has served as a contributor to several books, including the Oxford Companion to American Military History (2000) on the topic of grenades, mortars, and land mines. He also served as a technical advisor for the book Black Hawk Down. Atwater has appeared as a firearms and ordnance expert in many documentaries regarding military history on such television channels as The History Channel, TLC, Discovery Channel, and The Military Channel. One of Atwater's recent projects is preserving some of the last remaining historic military assets in the world. Atwater said of the Ordnance Museum Foundation that "It is our moral and legal responsibility to preserve military assets".

== Awards ==
In addition to his previously noted military honors, Atwater’s civilian awards include:

- The Excellence in Federal Service Award
- Outstanding Civilian Service Award
- Commander's Award for Public Service
- The Order of Samuel Sharpe
- Member, Hall of Fame, Ordnance Corps Association
