= Decoration for Exceptional Civilian Service =

The Decoration for Exceptional Civilian Service may refer to:

- Department of the Army Decoration for Exceptional Civilian Service
- Department of the Air Force Decoration for Exceptional Civilian Service
- Central Intelligence Agency Exceptional Service Medallion
- Office of the Secretary of Defense Exceptional Civilian Service Award
- Defense Contract Management Agency Exceptional Civilian Service Award
- Defense Information Systems Agency Exceptional Civilian Service Medal
- Defense Intelligence Agency Exceptional Civilian Service Medal
- Defense Supply Agency Exceptional Civilian Service Award
- Defense Threat Reduction Agency Exceptional Service Award
- National Security Agency Exceptional Civilian Service Medal
- Department of Energy Exceptional Service Medal
- U.S. Customs and Border Protection Commissioners Exceptional Service Medal
- Department of Justice Attorney General's Award for Exceptional Service
- Environmental Protection Agency Gold Medal for Exceptional Service
- National Aeronautics and Space Administration (NASA) Exceptional Service Medal
- Selective Service System Exceptional Service Medal
