= List of U.S. Army Chaplain Corps regimental awards =

For the purpose of acknowledging dedication and achievement as well as accomplishments which merit recognition for their credit to the mission of the Chaplain Corps, the following have been authorized to be conferred upon those individuals deemed to have demonstrated the highest standards of integrity and moral character, displayed an outstanding degree of professional competence, selflessly served Soldiers and Families, and contributed to the promotion of the Army Chaplaincy.

The character and meaning of all Chaplain Corps awards are exemplified in Nurture, Care and Honor competencies and "Live the Call" charge of the Chaplain Corps. Accordingly, only actions taken and support rendered "without which the mission of the Army Chaplain Corps would have been impaired," or "which was necessary to the continuance of or enhancement of the overall Army Chaplain Corps mission," and deeds of defined acts of Faithfulness, Humility, Selflessness, and Sacrifice should be considered. As a result, nominees of all awards must demonstrate the highest levels of integrity, moral character, effective commitment to religious or military professionalism, and personal demonstration of the Army and Sacred Values of the Chaplin Corps.

== Order of Martin of Tours ==
Order of Martin of Tours
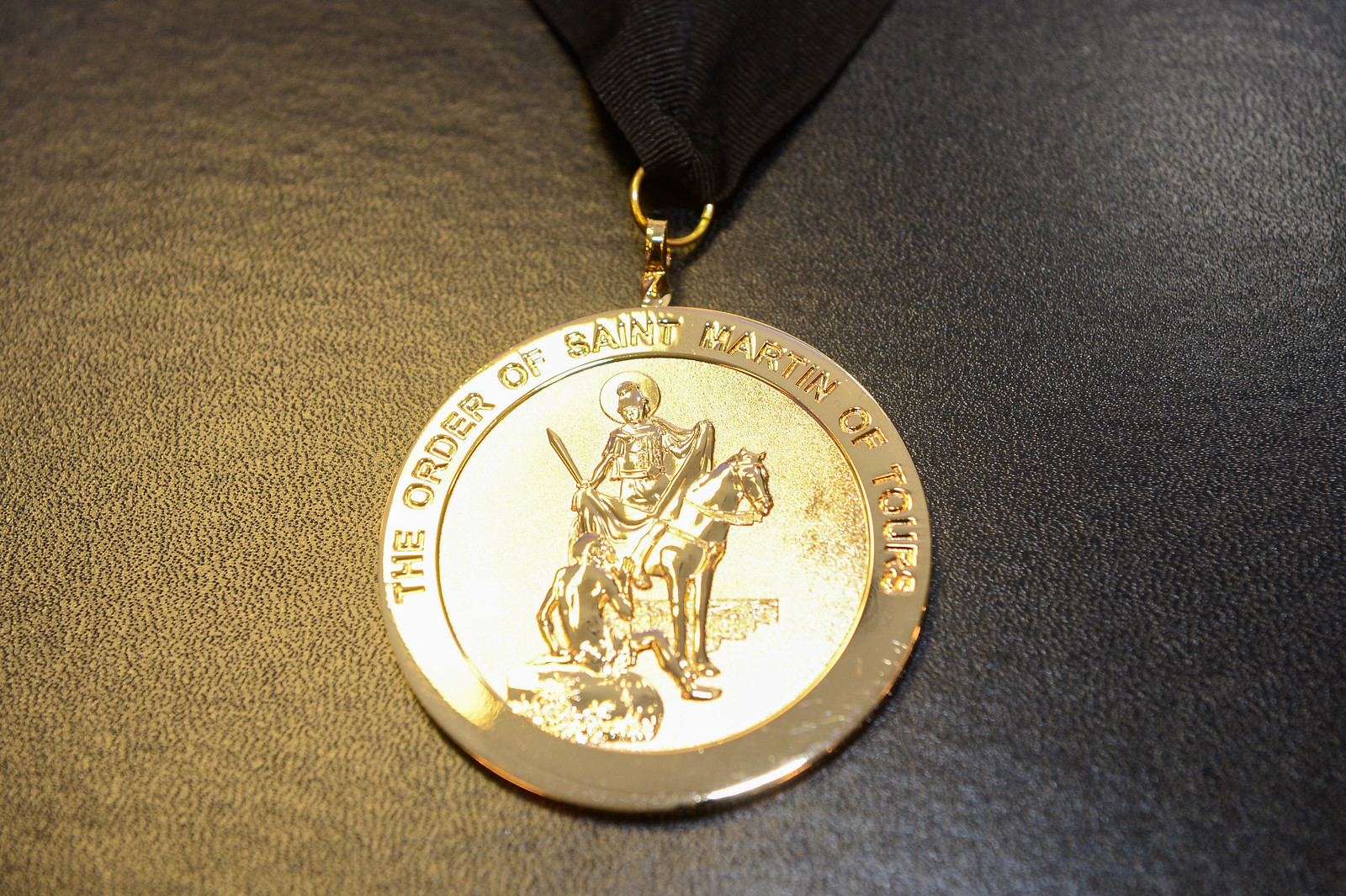
- Type: Neck medal (Regimental Award)
- Awarded for: Demonstrating the highest standards of integrity and moral character, displayed an outstanding degree of professional competence, selflessly served Soldiers and Families, and contributed to the promotion of the Army Chaplaincy
- Eligibility: Chaplains Corps Personnel (all components)
- Status: Currently awarded
- First award: Nov. 9, 2017.
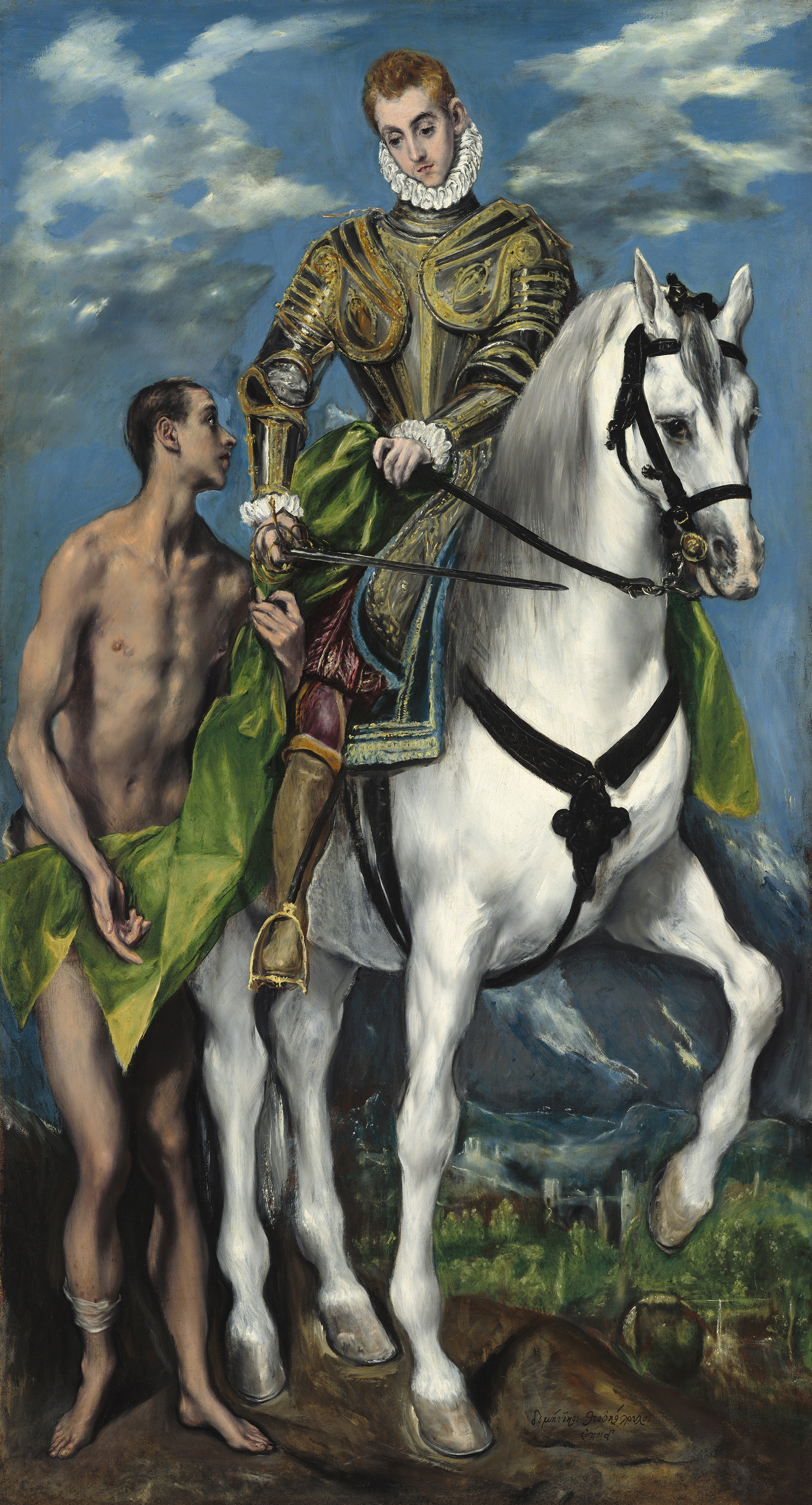
- Saint Martin and the Beggar (El Greco) c. 1577–1579

Precedence
- Next (lower): Officer: The Four Chaplains Medal; Enlisted: SSG Christopher Stout Medal

=== History ===
The Order of Martin of Tours is titled in honor of the religious experience of a soldier in the Roman army who was stationed in Gaul (modern-day France). One day as he was approaching the gates of the city of Amiens, he met a scantily clad beggar and impulsively cut his military cloak in half to share with the man. That night, Martin dreamed of Jesus wearing the half-cloak he had given away and he heard Jesus say to the angels: “Martin, who is still but a catechumen, clothed me with this robe.” (Sulpicius, ch 2). In another version, when Martin woke, he found his cloak restored to wholeness. The dream confirmed Martin in his piety, and he was baptized at the age of 18.

The part of the cloak he kept became a famous relic preserved in the oratory of the Merovingian kings of the Franks at the Marmoutier Abbey near Tours. During the Middle Ages, the supposed relic of St. Martin's miraculous cloak (cappa Sancti Martini) was carried by the king even into battle, and used as a holy relic upon which oaths were sworn. The cloak is first attested to in the royal treasury in 679, when it was conserved at the palatium of Luzarches, a royal villa that was later ceded to the monks of Saint-Denis by Charlemagne, in 798/99. During the Middle Ages, the relic of St. Martin's miraculous cloak, (cappa Sancti Martini) was carried by kings into battle and utilized in the swearing of oaths.

The priest who cared for the cloak in its reliquary was called a cappellanu, and ultimately all priests who served the military were called cappellani. The French translation is chapelains, from which the English word chaplain is derived. A similar linguistic development took place for the term, referring to the small temporary churches built for the relic. People called them a "capella", the word for a little cloak. Eventually, such small churches lost their association with the cloak, and all small churches began to be referred to as "chapels".

=== Eligibility ===
The Order of Martin of Tours has two levels:

1. The Honorable Order of Martin of Tours is awarded to those chaplains and Religious Affairs Specialists who have demonstrated the highest standards of integrity and moral character, displayed an outstanding degree of professional competence, selflessly served Soldiers and Families, and contributed to the promotion of the Army Chaplaincy. The Honorable Order of Martin of Tours may be conferred upon any currently serving or retired Chaplain or Religious Affairs Specialist from all components who meet these standards in the active support of Army Chaplaincy programs or missions during the previous calendar year. This award is only bestowed on an individual once.
2. The Ancient Order of Martin of Tours is reserved for Chaplains and Religious Affairs Specialists who achieve long-term, exceptional service to the Army Chaplaincy, surpassing even Honorable Order of Martin of Tours recipients. Such exceptional service must include extraordinary achievements and recognized service of Chaplains and Religious Affairs Specialists who promote the objectives and purposes of the Chaplain Corps. The Ancient Order of Martin of Tours may be conferred upon any currently serving or retired Chaplain or Religious Affairs Specialist from all components who meet these standards in the past 10 years who have demonstrated exceptional religious support leadership.

== The Four Chaplains Medal ==
The Four Chaplains Medal
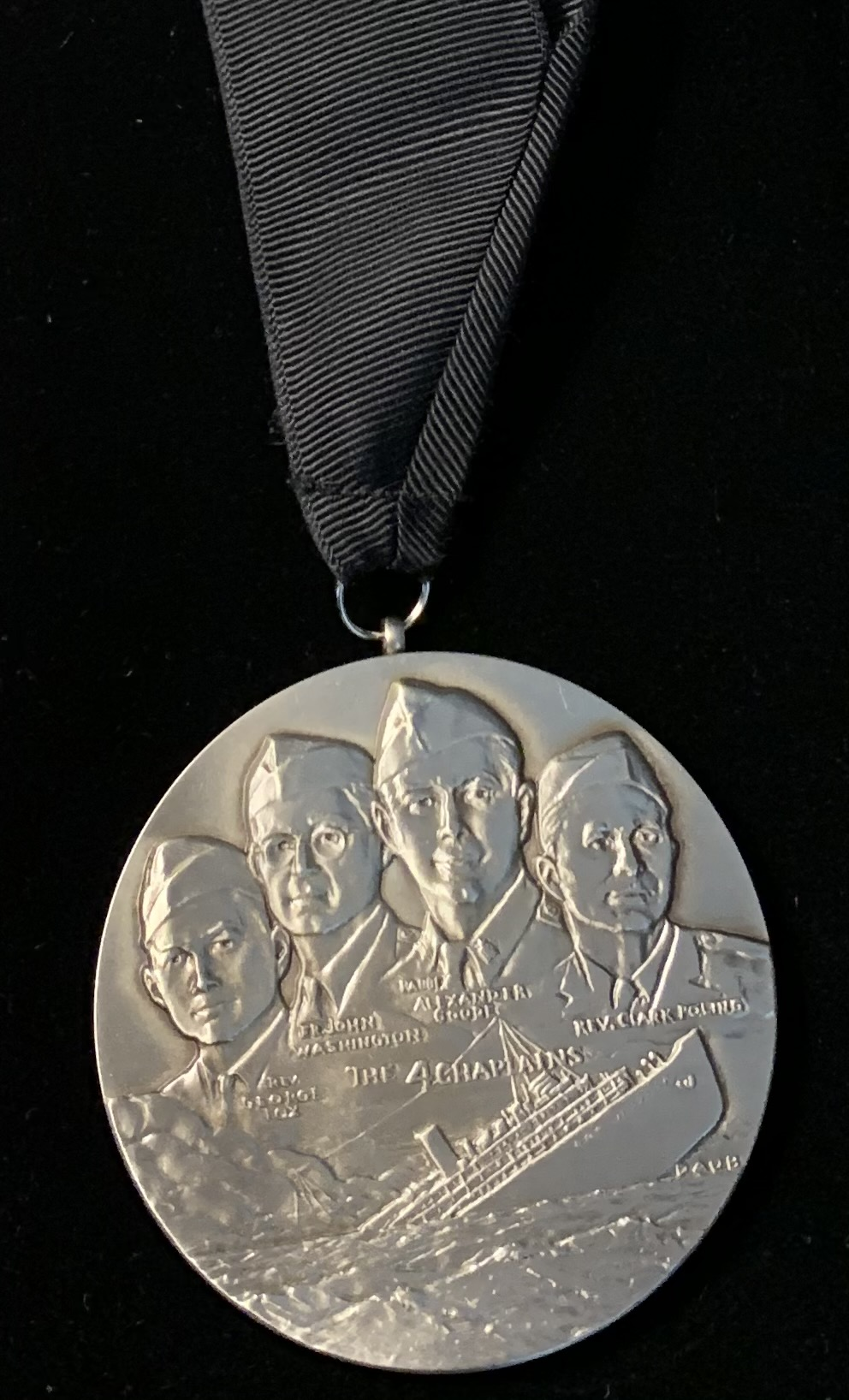
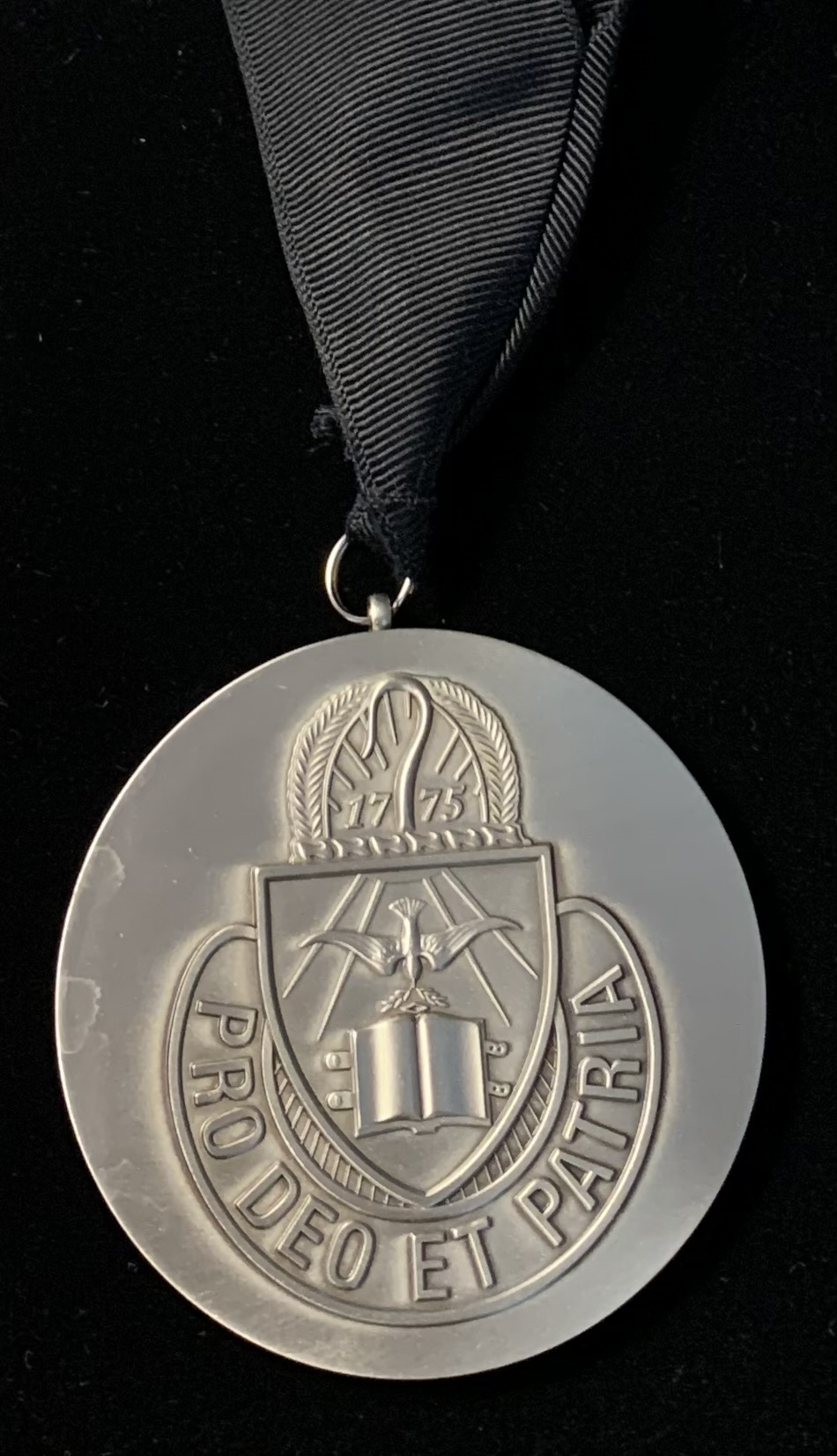
- Front and reverse of the neck medal
- Type: Military medal (Regimental Award)
- Awarded for: Selfless ministry actions and support rendered on behalf of Soldiers and Families that greatly impact the local or extended Army community
- Eligibility: Army Chaplains (all components)
- Status: Currently awarded
- Established: 2017
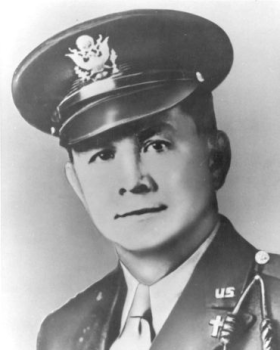
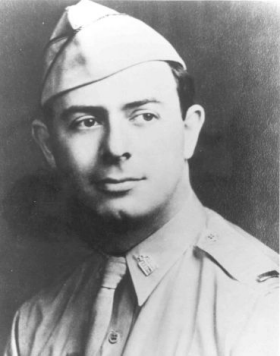
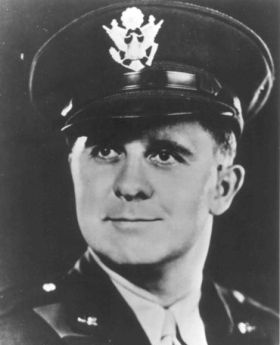
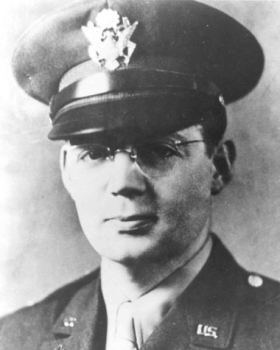
- George L. Fox, Alexander D. Goode Clark V. Poling, John P. Washington

Precedence
- Next (higher): The Order of Martin of Tours

The Four Chaplains Medal, not to be confused with the Four Chaplains' Medal, a Commemorative decoration awarded posthumously to the medal's namesake, is a regimental award for excellence in service for an achievement or a shorter duration than both levels of the Order of Martin of Tours.

=== History ===
The award is named for The Four Chaplains, also referred to as the "Immortal Chaplains" or the "Dorchester Chaplains", who died rescuing civilian and military personnel as the troopship SS Dorchester sank on February 3, 1943. The Four Chaplains each helped other Soldiers board lifeboats and gave up their own life jackets when the supply ran out. The chaplains gathered on deck, joined arms, said prayers, and sang hymns as the ship went down.

The Four Chaplains Medal recognizes exceptional impact made by Army chaplains of all components (active, guard, and reserve) who best exemplify exceptional courage, personal sacrifice, teamwork, religious calling, and the Army Values in dealing with Soldiers, Commanders, Families, and the Army.

=== Eligibility ===
The character and meaning of The Four Chaplains award is exemplified in the professional and religious commitment of Chaplains’ Alexander Goode, George Fox, Clark Poling, and John Washington. Placing the welfare of soldiers above their own, with common sacrificed, they gave their life jackets to soldiers and continue to minister until the ship sank beneath the waves. Accordingly, only ministry actions taken and selfless support rendered on behalf of Soldiers and Families that greatly impact the local or extended Army community are taken into consideration.

The award is given for collegial selfless behavior while rendering religious support to the military community regardless of faith or race in keeping with the spirit of the sacrifice of the Four Chaplains.

== SSG Christopher Stout Medal ==
SSG Christopher Stout Medal
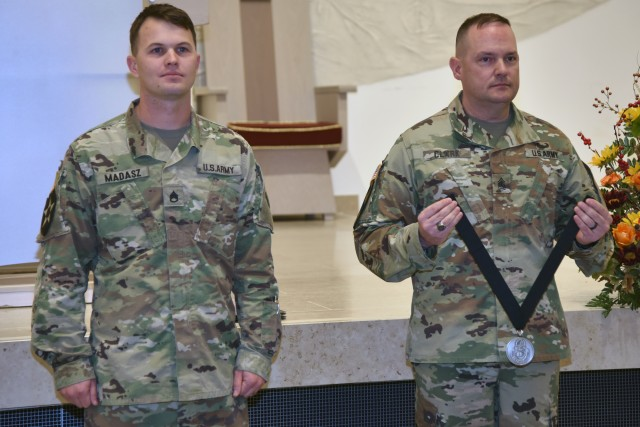
- SSG Aaron Madasz was presented the SSG Christopher Stout Medal
- Type: Military medal (Regimental Award)
- Awarded for: Exemplary contributions and display of values in dealings with Soldiers, Commanders, Family members.
- Eligibility: Religious Affairs Specialists (all components)
- Status: Currently awarded
- First award: Nov. 9, 2017
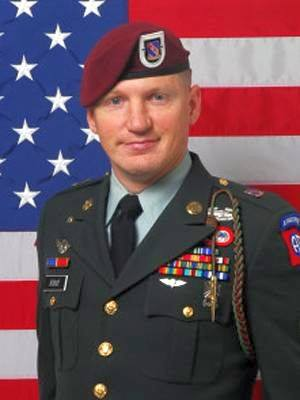
- SSG Christopher Stout (KIA July 13, 2010)

Precedence
- Next (higher): The Order of Martin of Tours

Staff Sergeant Christopher Stout was the first Religious Affairs Specialist Killed in Action since the Vietnam War. A military professional of the highest caliber, SSG Stout was known by others as a brother and a shield of armor. His devotion and love for his fellow paratroopers epitomize the spirit of the Army Chaplain Corps. Assigned to 1st Battalion, 508th Parachute Infantry Regiment, 4th Brigade Combat Team, 82nd Airborne Division, Fort Bragg, North Carolina; SSG Stout Died on 13 July 2010 in Kandahar City, Afghanistan, of wounds sustained when insurgents attacked his unit with rocket-propelled grenades and small-arms fire.

=== Eligibility ===
The SSG Christopher Stout Medal is an annual award that recognizes those Noncommissioned Officers and Soldiers who best exemplify its namesake's contributions and values in their dealings with Soldiers, Commanders, Family members, and the Army during the previous calendar year.

=== Criteria ===
This award is given to Religious Affairs Specialists who emulate SSG Stout's legacy as a Soldier, leader, and person of character, creatively shaping the environment by technical expertise and proficient warrior tasks in religious support operations for the unit and the mission. Nominees must demonstrate enhancement of three core capabilities: Integrated religious operations, spiritual readiness, and basic human interaction in the total JIIM battle space at the tactical, operational, and strategic levels. In addition, nominees must demonstrate initiatives that greatly enhance religious support capabilities.

== Order of Martha Washington Award ==
Order of Martha Washington Award
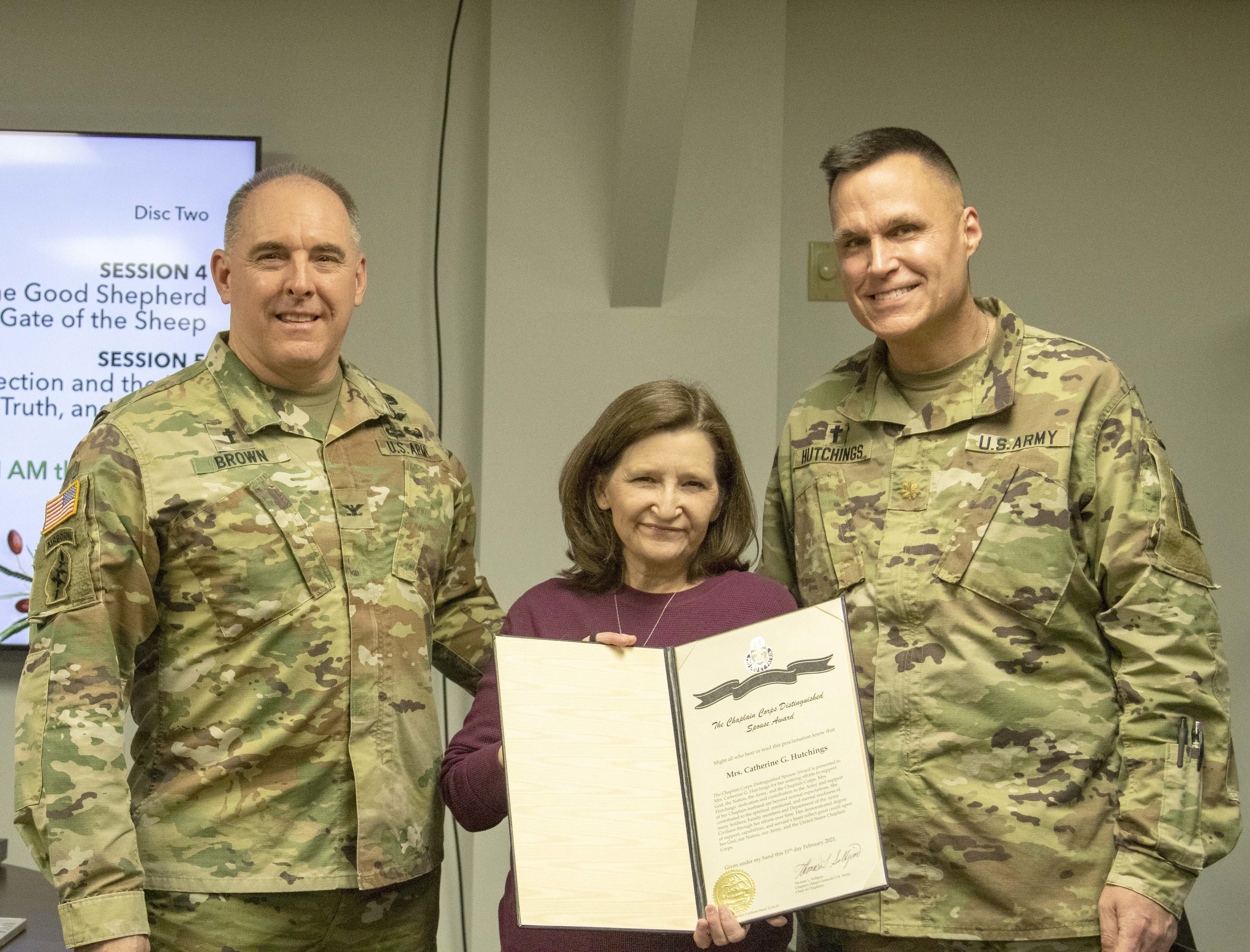
- Chaplain Spouse Receives the Order of Martha Washington Award
- Awarded for: Significant contributions over an extended period of time through active support of Army-wide chaplain program and on-going military Religious Support
- Eligibility: Souses of Chaplain Corps personnel
- Status: Currently awarded
- Established: 2017

=== History ===
The character and meaning of the Order of Martha Washington Award is exemplified in her actions as general George Washington's spouse during the Revolutionary War. When general Washington took command of the Continental Army, Martha Washington was suddenly responsible for child-rearing, guest hospitality, and supervision of the family estate. In addition to her estate responsibilities, she became a critical support for her husband when he was in camp by volunteering to manage the food and social events of his headquarters and serving as his sounding board and closest confidant. Martha Washington also became her husband's secretary and representative at official functions. Finally, Martha nursed sick Soldiers in camp and acted as a liaison between General Washington and other officials. Accordingly, this award recognizes those spouse actions that provide exceptional support to the military member where their absence, we have impaired the mission of the Army Chaplain Corps.

=== Eligibility ===
This award may be presented to Chaplains, Religious Affairs Specialists, or DA Civilian spouses who have made significant contributions over an extended period of time through active support of Army-wide chaplain program and ongoing military Religious Support missions.

== Order of Aaron and Hur ==
Order of Aaron and Hur
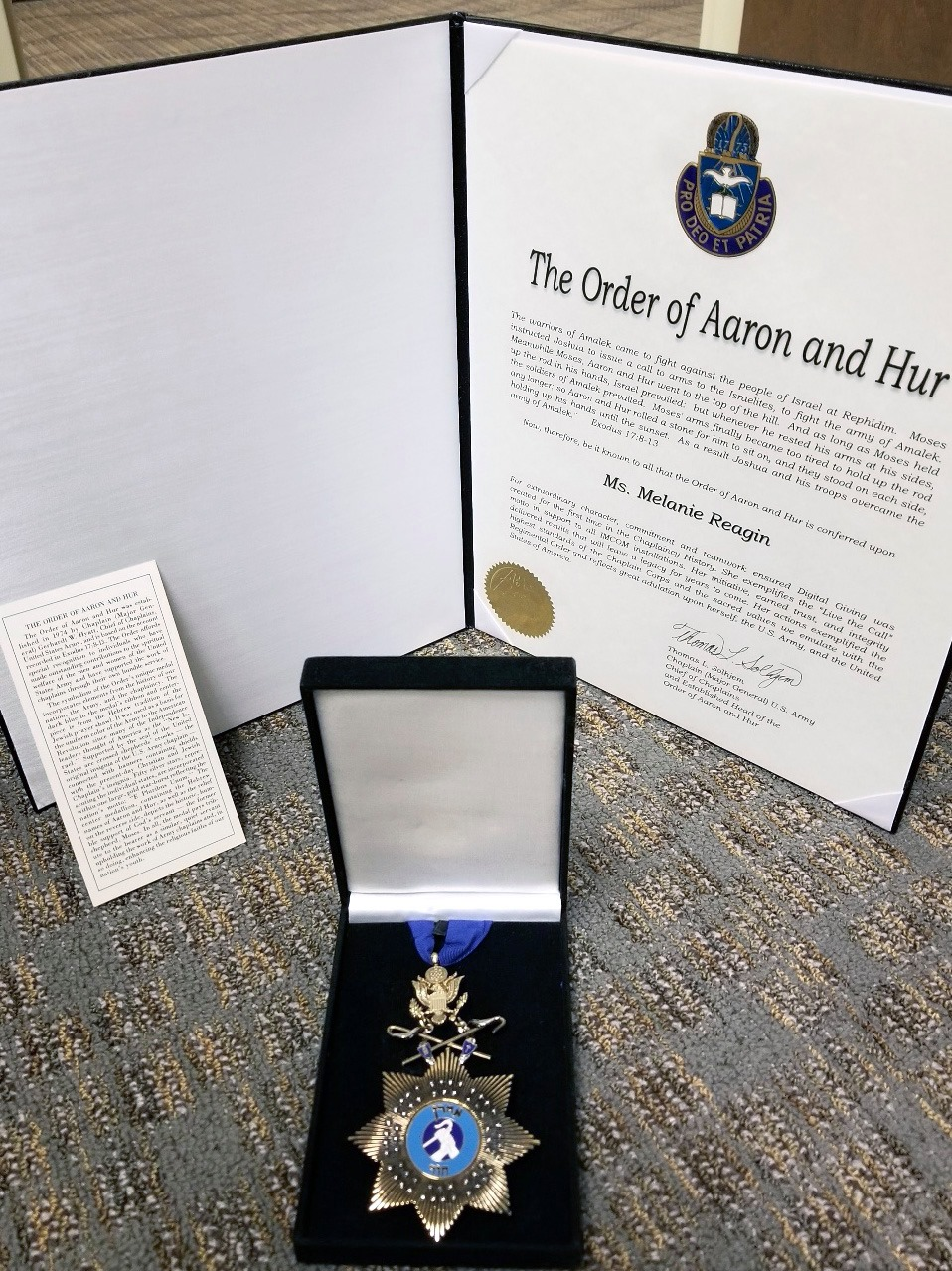
- Order of Aaron and Hur Award and citation
- Awarded for: Significant contributions over an extended period of time through active support of either local or Army-wide chaplain led Religious Support programs
- Eligibility: Non-branch military or civilians
- Status: Currently awarded
- Established: 1974

=== History ===
The Order of Aaron and Hur is the oldest Chaplain Corps award, the character and meaning of the exemplified in "supporting the arms" of the Chaplain Corps. Accordingly, the Order affords special recognition to individuals who have made outstanding contributions to the spiritual welfare of the men and women of the US Army and where exceptional actions are taken and support rendered "without which the mission of the Army Chaplain Corps would have been impaired" or "which was necessary to the continuance of or enhancement of the overall Army Chaplain Corps mission."

=== Eligibility ===
This award may be presented to either non-branch military or civilian nominees who made a significant contribution over an extended period of time through active support of either local or Army-wide chaplain-led Religious Support programs.

== Wear and Display ==
Department of the Army Regulations
While most branch awards and their criteria for merit are maintained by veteran associations and honor societies, albeit current and former service members, they are non-military civilian organizations; Chaplain Corps awards are conferred upon personnel by the authority and approval of the Chief of Chaplains. Though, technically, regulation prevents ordinary wear of awards below Headquarters, Department of the Army level or their reflection on record briefs. Regimental Awards are typically worn at formal functions, balls or dinings-in and dinings-out, Ceremonial and social occasions, or unless directed by a commander in accordance with Army Regulation 670-1, para 22–2, medallions are worn at the option of the wearer, when not prohibited, during normal duty hours.

In a similar tradition and manner that personnel wear the Sergeant Audie Murphy medallion on appropriate uniforms when off duty. Personnel are encouraged to wear regimental neck medals and medallions on the service, dress, and mess uniforms.

Dress Uniform:

Military Awards AR 600-8-22

6-2. Service Ribbons:
b. The MOH is the only decoration authorized a neck ribbon. The service ribbon for the MOH is the same color as the neckband, showing five stars in the form of an "M". (See AR 670–1 for wear of service ribbons).

Formal Corps functions:

Wear and Appearance of Army Uniforms and Insignia AR 670-1

22–9. Multiple neck ribbons, broad sashes, and stars:
b. An individual may not wear more than two decorations with neck ribbons at one time. The decoration with the highest precedence is worn suspended above the other. The Medal of Honor takes precedence over all other decorations with neck ribbons.

Guide to the Wear and Appearance of Army Uniforms and Insignia DA Pam 670-1

22–9. Multiple neck ribbons, broad sashes, and stars:
a. Decorations with neck ribbons are worn with the neckband ribbon around the neck outside the shirt collar and inside the coat collar with the medal hanging over the necktie.

Civilian Attire:

Men will wear the Medal around their neck with the ribbon over the shirt collar and inside the coat collar. Whether it is worn with a bow tie or necktie, the medal should hang at the full length of the ribbon. When the necktie is worn, the medal will hang over the tie.
Women should wear the Medal around their neck, outside the shirt collar and inside the coat collar with the medal hanging the full length of the ribbon.

When Wearing Awards is Prohibited:

Wearing awards is prohibited in the following circumstances

a. On any uniform other than those prescribed in regulation.

b. When wearing civilian clothing. Soldiers may wear medallions on formal civilian attire at formal social functions when wearing the Army uniform is inappropriate or not authorized.

While the regulations governing branch awards, the Sergeant Audie Murphy Award and wear of the Stetson do not appear in the Army Regulation governing wear and appearance of uniforms and insignia, Major Commands, such as TRADOC and FORSCOM have published their own regulations authorizing and outlining their wear. (FORSCOM Regulation 600-80-1) (TRADOC Regulation 600-21)

== See also ==
- Chaplain Corps (United States Army)
- Musicians of the Titanic – lost at sea as RMS Titanic sank in 1912

Regimental association awards

- Order of the Spur - Cavalry
- Order of St. Joan D'Arc Medallion - Cavalry (spouses)
- General Winfield Scott Medallion - Civil Affairs & Special Forces
- Order of Lewis and Clark - Civil Affairs
- Saint George Award - Armor
- Order of Saint Michael - Aviation
- De Fleury Medal - Engineers
- Order of Saint Barbara - Field Artillery
- Order of Saint Maurice - Infantry
- Order of Military Medical Merit (O2M3) - Medical
- Thomas Knowlton Award - Military Intelligence
- Order of the Marechausse - Military Police
- Samuel Sharpe Award - Ordnance Corps
- Order of Mercury - Signal Corps
- Saint Philip Neri - Special Forces
- Military Order of Saint Martin - Quartermaster Corps
- Order of Saint Christopher - Transportation Corps Regimental Association
