= Public Service Commendation Medal =

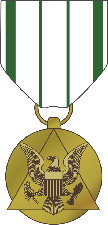
- Public Service Commendation Medal
- Type: Civil public service award
- Awarded for: Service or achievements that contribute significantly to the accomplishment of the mission of an Army activity, command, or staff agency.
- Country: United States
- Presented by: Department of the Army
- Eligibility: Any individual (except Army civilian employees who are eligible for Army honorary awards, military personnel, or Army contractors), Federal Government officials at the policy development level, and technical personnel who serve the Army in an advisory capacity or as consultants.
- Established: 14 June 1983
- Ribbon bar of the medal

Precedence
- Next (higher): Meritorious Public Service Medal
- Equivalent: Civilian Service Commendation Medal
- Next (lower): Certificate of Appreciation for Patriotic Civilian Service

The Public Service Commendation Medal is the fourth highest public service decoration the United States Department of the Army can bestow upon a civilian, ranking directly below the Meritorious Public Service Medal. The name of the decoration was changed from the Commander's Award for Public Service in November 2014 to make the nomenclature more consistent with the equivalent award for military service—the Army Commendation Medal.

== Eligibility ==
Army civilian employees who are eligible for Army honorary awards or military personnel are not eligible. Civilians not employed by the Army, Army contractors, Federal Government officials at the policy development level, and technical personnel who serve the Army in an advisory capacity or as consultants are eligible. AR672-20 regulates the award.

== Criteria ==
This award may be approved by any commander (colonel and above), commanders exercising courts-martial authority, principal officials of Headquarters, Department of the Army staff agencies, and officials of general officer or Senior Executive Service rank.

== Appearance ==
The Public Service Commendation Medal is a bronze disc 35 mm height and 32 mm in width. Superimposed on the disc is an equilateral triangle which symbolizes civilians. Displayed on the triangle is the coat of arms of the United States, symbolizing service to the federal government.

The reverse of the medal bears the inscription FOR COMMENDABLE PUBLIC SERVICE TO THE UNITED STATES ARMY.

The medal is suspended from a white ribbon 35 mm in width consisting of two 3 mm stripes of myrtle green near the edges and two 1 mm stripes of Myrtle Green toward the center.

== See also ==
- Department of the Army Civilian Awards
- Awards and decorations of the United States government
