= Army Distinguished Public Service Medal =

American military award

Distinguished Public Service Medal
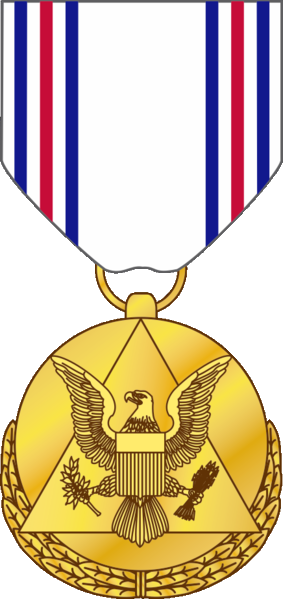
- Decoration for Distinguished Civilian Service
- Type: Civilian public service award
- Awarded for: Distinguished service that makes a substantial contribution to the accomplishment of the Army's missions.
- Country: United States
- Presented by: Department of the Army
- Eligibility: Civilians not employed by the Federal Government for outstanding public service to the Department of the Army.
- Established: May 1956
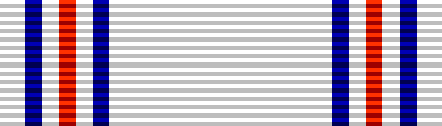
- Ribbon bar of the medal

Precedence
- Next (lower): Superior Public Service Medal
- Related: Navy Distinguished Public Service Medal

The Distinguished Public Service Medal, formerly the Department of the Army Decoration for Distinguished Civilian Service was established by directive of the Secretary of the Army in May 1956. This award consists of a gold medal, lapel button and certificate. This award recognizes distinguished service toward the accomplishment of the Army's mission.

== Eligibility ==
The Secretary of the Army awards this decoration to those who provide distinguished service that makes a substantial contribution to the accomplishment of the Army's missions. Eligible individuals include, employees of the Federal Government, officials at the policy development level, Army contractors, and technical personnel who serve the Army in an advisory capacity or as consultants. Army civilian employees are not eligible, as they are eligible for Department of the Army Honorary Awards, nor are military personnel.

== Description ==
The Distinguished Public Service Medal is a gold disc 40 mm in height and 36.5 mm in width, with a laurel wreath on the lower half of the rim representing non-military service. Superimposed on the disc is an equilateral triangle which symbolizes the civilian. Displayed on the triangle is the eagle of the Great Seal of the United States. The reverse of the medal bears the inscription "Awarded to ... for distinguished public service to the United States Army". The medal is suspended by a white ribbon 35 mm in width. The edges of the ribbon have thin stripes of white, ultramarine blue, white, and old glory red.

== See also ==
- Department of the Army Civilian Awards
- Awards and decorations of the United States government
