= Superior Public Service Medal =

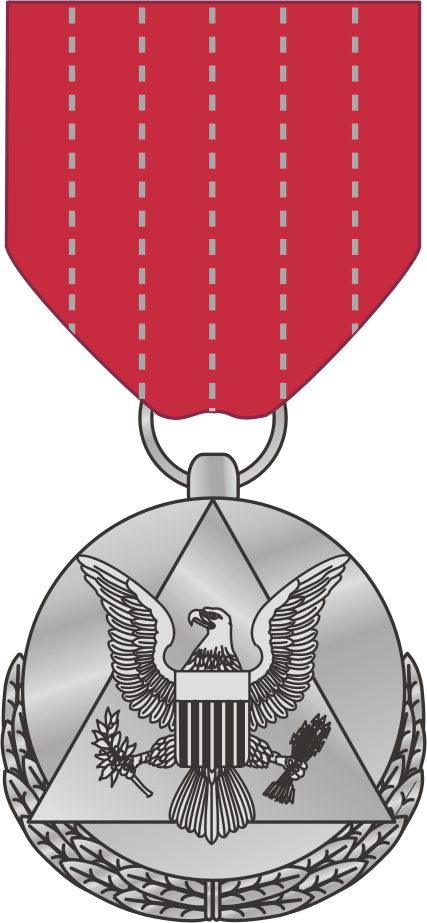
- Secretary of the Army Public Service Award
- Type: Civilian public service award
- Awarded for: Exceptional service that makes a substantial contribution to the accomplishment of the Army's missions
- Country: United States
- Presented by: Department of the Army
- Eligibility: Civilians not employed by the Federal Government for outstanding public service to the Department of the Army.
- Established: June 1998
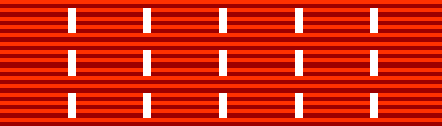
- Ribbon bar of the medal

Precedence
- Next (higher): Decoration for Distinguished Civilian Service
- Next (lower): Meritorious Public Service Medal

The Superior Public Service Medal formerly the Secretary of the Army Public Service Award consists of a silver medal, lapel button, and citation certificate. The United States Secretary of the Army awards this decoration to those who provide exceptional service that makes a substantial contribution to the accomplishment of the Army's missions. These include any individual (except Army civilian employees who are eligible for Army honorary awards, military personnel, or Army contractors).

== Eligibility ==
The Secretary of the Army awards this decoration to private citizens. Army civilian employees (who are eligible for Army honorary awards in accordance with Chapter 9-1.2 of Army Regulation 672-20), military personnel and Army contractors are ineligible. This award is appropriate for spouses of military members provided they meet the criteria. Nominations for this award are forwarded to the Army Incentive Awards Board through command channels. Nominated individuals must have provided exceptional public service to the Army deserving of greater recognition than that which can be granted by a Major Army Commander.

== Background ==
The medal was established by directive of the Secretary of the Army in June 1998. It is ranked between the Distinguished Civilian Service Decoration and the Outstanding Civilian Service Award. This award consists of a silver medal, lapel button and certificate. A service ribbon and miniature size medal are also available.

== See also ==
- Department of the Army Civilian Awards
- Awards and decorations of the United States government
