= Slogans of the United States Army =

This World War I recruitment poster by James Montgomery Flagg, with more than four million copies printed in 1917 and 1918, defined not only an Army recruiting slogan, but also Uncle Sam's image for years to come.

U.S. Army TV advertisement from 1986 using the "Be All You Can Be!" slogan

Slogans of the United States Army have been changed several times in the 20th century, relative to the 21st.

== World War I ==
"I Want YOU for US Army" featured on a poster of Uncle Sam painted by James Montgomery Flagg.

== 1950s–1971 ==
"Choice, Not Chance" and "Modern Army Green" were both used as slogans to advertise for having the choice of job training, travel, and branch and to highlight the newly introduced Class A Uniform, respectively. Public announcements on broadcast television, and highway roadway signs advertised slogans during a time of a national draft of young men 18 to 34 years of age. The advantage of volunteering for service as opposed to being drafted was the option to choose which career field you wanted to serve in along with the first unit and/or location of assignment.

== 1971 to 1980 ==
"Today's Army Wants You" and "Today's Army Wants to Join You" were recruiting slogans from the 1971 Volunteer Army (Project VOLAR) campaign, introduced as the country prepared to transition to an all-volunteer military. When N. W. Ayer & Son, who were engaged by the US Army, believed they felt the army said "Today's Army is changing; we want to meet you half way", the firm came up with that slogan. General William Westmoreland asked "Do we have to ask it that way?" but agreed to the campaign. The slogan was replaced by "Join the People Who've Joined the Army" in 1973, which later evolved into "This is the Army."

Slogan was written in 1971 by Ted Regan Jr., Executive Vice President and Executive Creative Director of N.W. Ayer, the Army's ad agency. Regan also wrote the follow-up slogan, "Join the people who've joined the Army.'

== 1980 to 2001 ==
"Be All That You Can Be" was the recruiting slogan of the United States Army for over twenty years. Earl Carter (pen-name, E.N.J. Carter) working for the N. W. Ayer Advertising Agency as a Senior Copywriter created the "Be All You Can Be" theme line in 1980. Its accompanying music was written by Jake Holmes. In January 2003, the U.S. Army awarded Carter its Outstanding Civilian Service Award. Carter's original concept sheet, with words "Be All That You Can Be", is now part of a permanent collection at the US Army Heritage Center Foundation.

In 2023, The U.S Army decided to bring back the slogan for newer recruitment campaigns.

== 2001 to 2006 ==
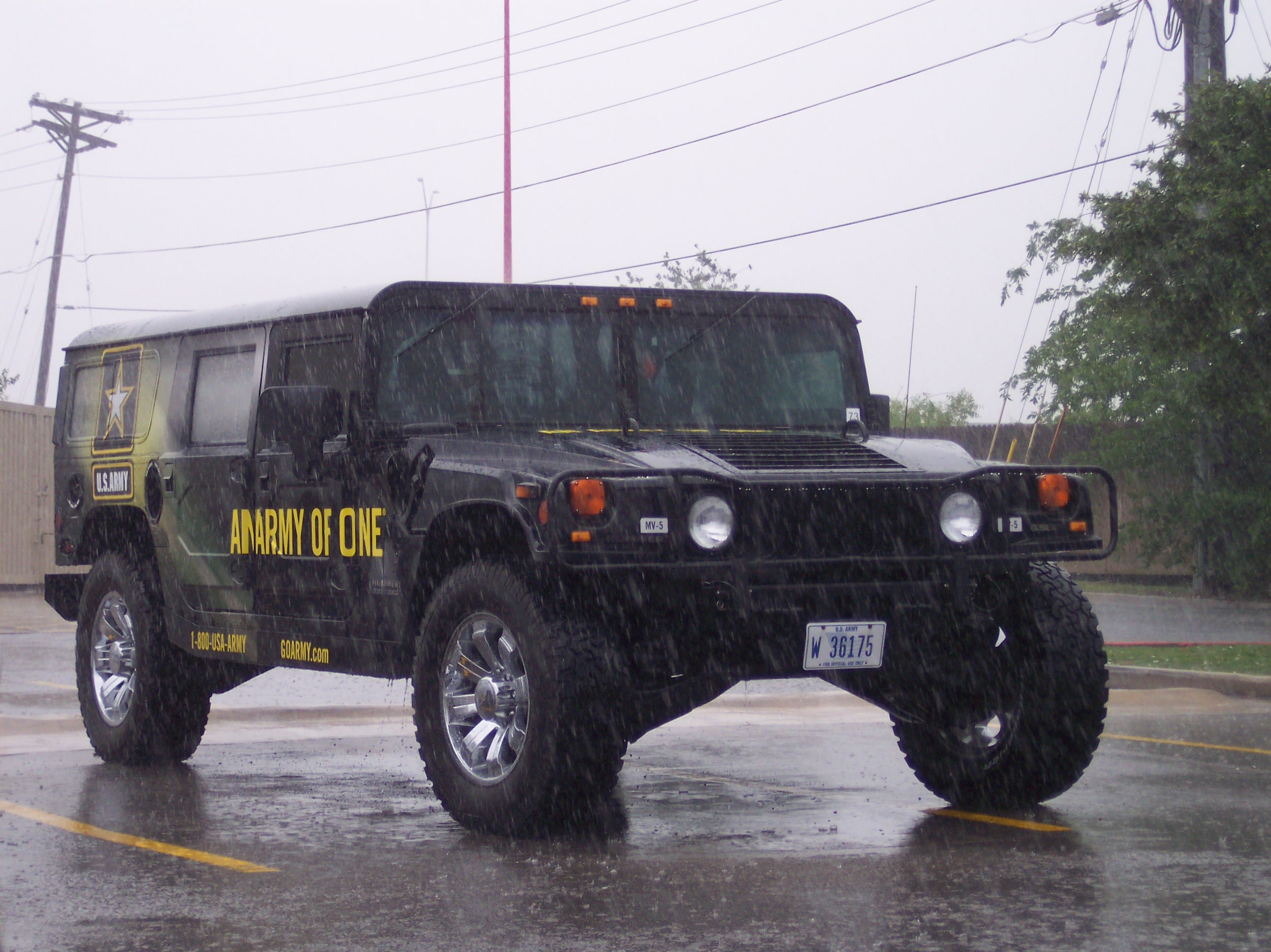
A Humvee wrapped with the slogan in April 2006

"Army of ONE" was a relatively short-lived recruiting slogan. It replaced the popular "Be All You Can Be" and was replaced in 2006 by the new slogan "Army Strong". The reason for the replacement, states Frank Luntz, is that the slogan "Army of One" is contrary to the idea of teamwork.

== 2006 to 2018 ==
The "Army Strong" advertising campaign's debut video, released in October 2006.

"Army Strong" was the recruiting slogan used for more than a decade by the United States Army. The composer of the music used in the Army Strong television advertisements is Mark Isham.

== 2018 to 2023 ==
The Army debuted a new recruiting slogan, "Warriors Wanted," in October 2018. The Army changed the slogan to "What's Your Warrior?" in 2019. The slogan launched on broadcast, print and digital properties in November 2019 and used "soldier stories" to persuade youths to enlist.

== 2023 to present ==
The Army has returned to the recruiting slogan of "Be All You Can Be." with an effective date of March 8, 2023.

== See also ==
- United States Armed Forces
