= Department of the Army Civilian Service Achievement Medal =

Awarded for noteworthy achievements by US Department of the Army

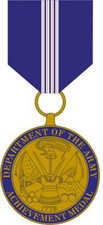
- Medal of the award
- Country: United States
- Presented by: Department of the Army
- Eligibility: Army civilian employees paid from appropriated and non-appropriated funds, or indirect-hire foreign nationals
- Established: 24 August 1987
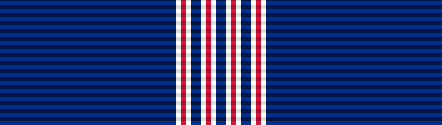
- Ribbon bar of the award

Precedence
- Next (higher): Civilian Service Commendation Medal
- Related: Army Achievement Medal

The Department of the Army Civilian Service Achievement Medal is awarded for noteworthy achievements that are of a lesser degree than those recognized by the Civilian Service Commendation Medal. It was approved by the Army Chief of Staff, on 24 August 1987. It is the fifth highest award in the Department of the Army Honorary Awards scheme for Department of the Army employees, ranking just below the Commander's Award for Civilian Service. It consists of a medal, lapel pin, and certificate.

== Criteria ==
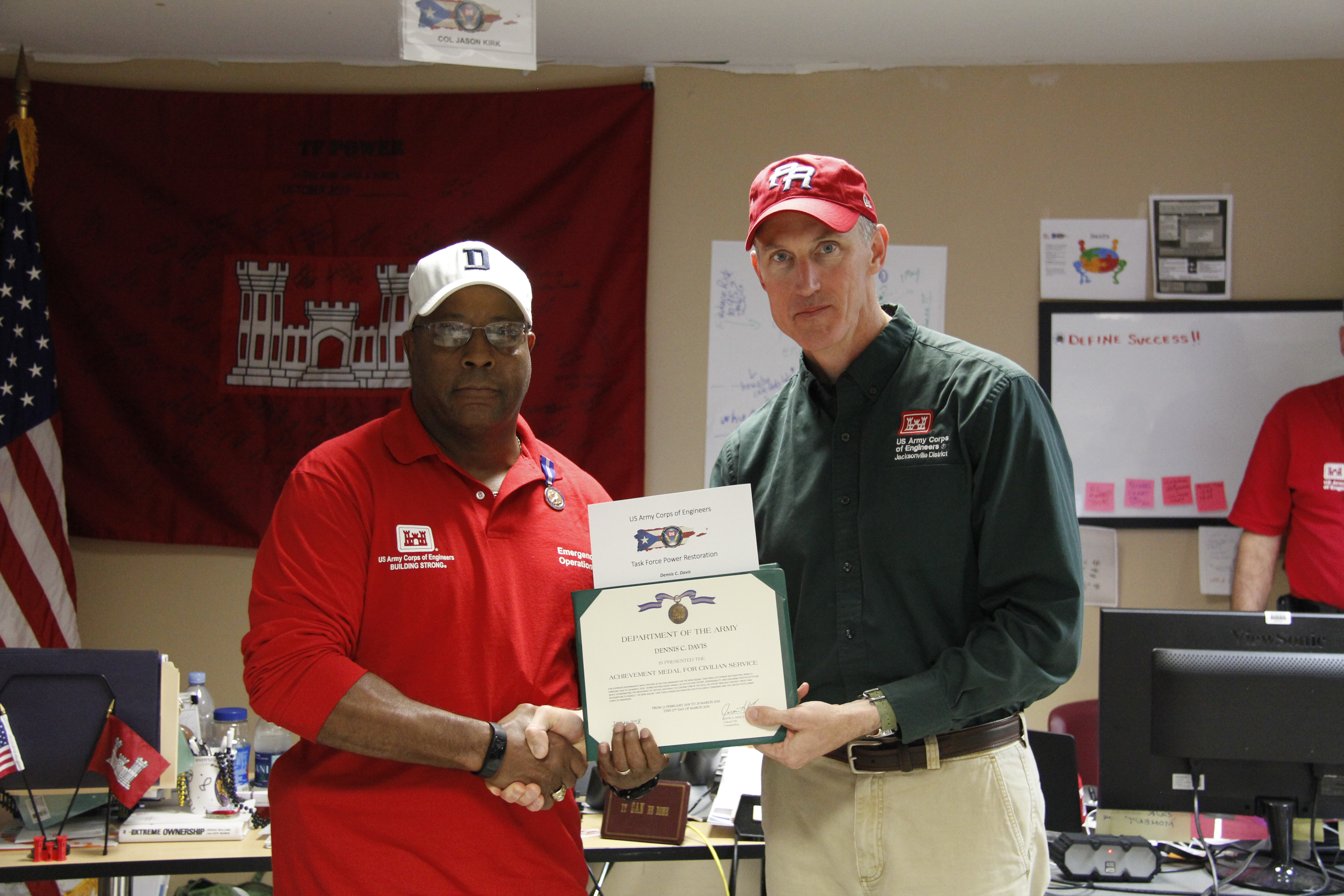
Dennis C. Davis receives Achievement Medal for Civilian Service for his work during Puerto Rico Power Restoration Task Force

Any commander Lieutenant Colonel and above, or civilian equivalent, may approve this award. A nomination normally covers either a period of sustained superior service or a level of achievement sufficient to warrant this recognition. This medal is comparable to the Army Achievement Medal. All Department of the Army civilian employees paid from appropriated and non-appropriated funds and indirect-hire foreign nationals are eligible for consideration. Eligibility should be determined by measuring contributions against the following examples of achievement:

- Accomplished supervisory or nonsupervisory duties in an outstanding manner, setting an example of achievement for others to follow.
- Demonstrated initiative and skill in devising new or improved equipment, work methods, and procedures; conceiving inventions that resulted in considerable savings in manpower, time, space, materials, or other items of expense; or items that improved safety or health of the workforce.
- Demonstrated leadership in performing assigned duties that resulted in improved productivity of the unit.
- Rendered professional or public relations service that resulted in considerable favorable publicity in the local area.
- Demonstrated courage or competence in an emergency while performing assigned duties resulting in benefit to the Government or its personnel.

== See also ==
- Department of the Army Civilian Awards
- Awards and decorations of the United States government
