= Department of the Army Meritorious Civilian Service Award =

U.S. Army award

Army Meritorious Civilian Service Award
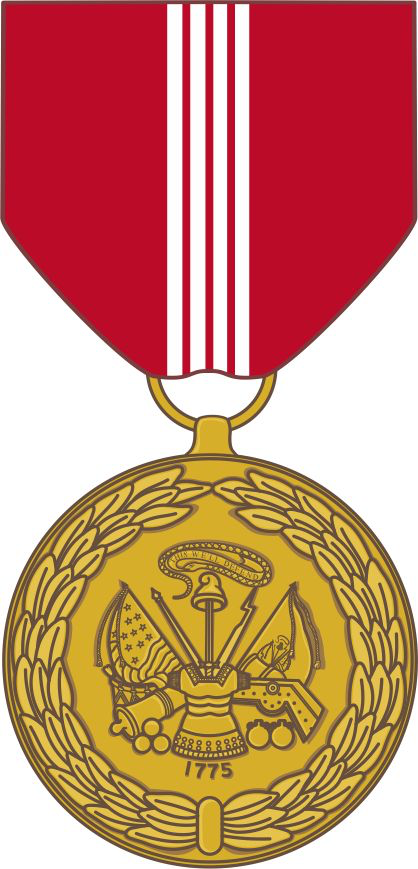
- Obverse of the post-2014 Army Meritorious Civilian Service Medal
- Awarded for: "Performance of duties in an exemplary manner, demonstrating unusual initiative and skill, achieving outstanding results, or exhibiting unusual courage in an emergency."
- Country: United States
- Presented by: Department of the Army
- Eligibility: Army civilian employees
- Established: 26 September 1959
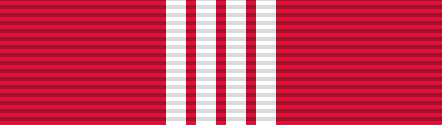
- Ribbon bar of the medal

Precedence
- Next (higher): Department of the Army Superior Civilian Service Award
- Equivalent: Meritorious Service Medal
- Next (lower): Civilian Service Commendation Medal

The Meritorious Civilian Service Award is the third highest award granted by U.S. Army Commanders (Major General and above, or civilian equivalent). It consists of a medal, lapel button, and citation certificate. Nominees must have established a pattern of excellence, normally demonstrated by the receipt of lower level awards. The award is comparable to the military Meritorious Service Medal. On 13 April 1987, the Army Chief of Staff approved this award as the Superior Civilian Service. In November 2014, the Department of the Army Civilian Service Medals were renamed by the Secretary of the Army to align award names closer to their military equivalents. At that time the award was renamed the Meritorious Civilian Service Medal and the design of the medal was modified to reflect that change.

== Eligibility ==
Eligibility is determined by measuring contributions against the following example levels of achievement:

- Accomplished supervisory or nonsupervisory duties in an exemplary manner, setting a record of achievement, and inspiring others to improve the quantity and quality of their work.
- Demonstrated unusual initiative and skill in devising new and improved equipment, work methods, and procedures; inventions resulting in substantial savings in expenses such as manpower, time, space, and materials, or improved safety or health of the workforce.
- Rendered professional or public relations service of a unique or distinctive character.
- Achieved outstanding results in improving the morale and performance of employees.
- Exhibited unusual courage or competence in an emergency, while performing assigned duties, resulting in direct benefit to the Government or its personnel.

== Description ==
The medal of the award is a bronze disc 1 3/8 in (35 mm) in diameter. On the obverse of the medal is the Department of the Army Seal encircled by a laurel wreath. The reverse contains the inscription in five lines FOR DEPARTMENT OF THE ARMY MERITOROUS CIVILIAN SERVICE—TO, while the lower edge contains a laurel wreath, extending up to the inscription. The medal is suspended from a crimson ribbon 35 mm in width with four thin white stripes in the center.

== See also ==
- Department of the Army Civilian Awards
- Awards and decorations of the United States government
