= Department of the Army Civilian Service Commendation Medal =

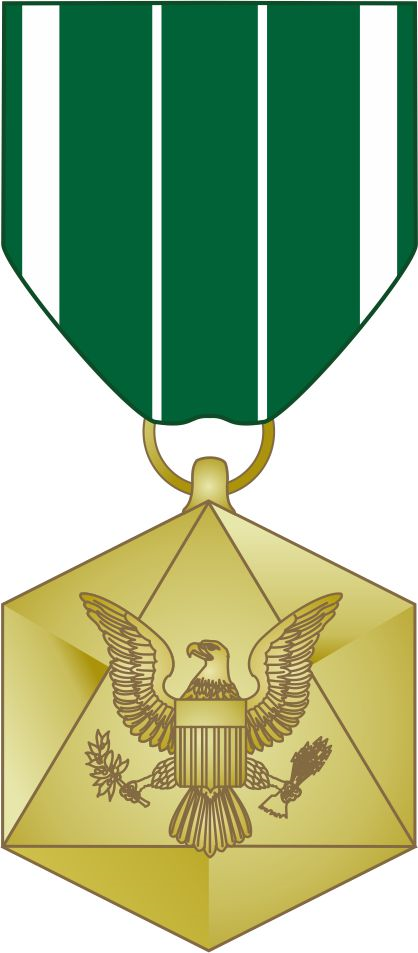
- Medal of the award
- Type: Civilian Honorary Award
- Awarded for: Service or achievement of a lesser degree than recognized by the Meritorious Civilian Service Medal.
- Country: United States
- Presented by: Department of the Army
- Eligibility: Army civilian employees
- Established: 30 June 1976
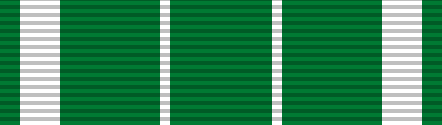
- Ribbon bar of the award

Precedence
- Next (higher): Meritorious Civilian Service Medal
- Next (lower): Achievement Medal for Civilian Service
- Related: Army Commendation Medal

The Department of the Army Civilian Service Commendation Medal (formerly the Commander's Award for Civilian Service) is an honorary award presented by the United States Department of the Army to civilian employees for commendable service or achievement. Employees who have a past record of excellence, normally recognized by the previous receipt of one or more honorary or performance awards, may be considered for this award. The Commander's Award for Civilian Service is comparable to the military Army Commendation Medal.

== Criteria ==
Any commander Colonel and above, or civilian equivalent, may approve this award. Nominations reflect service or achievement of a lesser degree than recognized by the Superior Civilian Service Award. Employees who have established a pattern of excellence, normally recognized through the previous receipt of one or more honorary or monetary performance awards, may be considered for this award. Eligibility is determined by measuring contributions against the following example levels of achievement:

- Accomplished supervisory or nonsupervisory duties in an outstanding manner, setting an example of achievement for others to follow.
- Demonstrated initiative and skill in devising new or improved equipment, work methods, and procedures, or conceiving inventions that resulted in considerable savings in manpower, time, space, materials, or other items of expense, or improved safety or health of the workforce.
- Demonstrated leadership in performing assigned duties that resulted in improved productivity of the unit. Rendered professional or public relations service that resulted in considerable favorable publicity in the local area.
- Rendered professional or public relations service that resulted in considerable favorable publicity in the local area
- Demonstrated courage or competence in an emergency while performing assigned duties resulting in benefit to the Government or its personnel.

In November 2014, Army civilian service medals were modified in order to make their nomenclature more consistent with their military equivalents. At that time the award was renamed the Civilian Service Commendation Medal and the design of the medal (both obverse and reverse) were changed accordingly.

== Description ==
The medal is a bronze hexagon 1 3/8 inches (3.5 cm) in height and 1 1/4 inches (3.2 cm) in width, with the eagle from the Great Seal of the United States displayed upon an equilateral triangle. The reverse of the medal is inscribed “DEPARTMENT OF THE ARMY CIVILIAN SERVICE COMMENDATION” at top and contains two crossed laurel branches at bottom. The medal is suspended from a ribbon 1 3/8 inches in width consisting of the following vertical stripes: 1/16” Green, 1/8” White, 5/16” Green, 1/32” White, 5/16” Green, 1/32”White, 5/16” Green, 1/8” White and 1/16” Green.

== See also ==
- Department of the Army Civilian Awards
- Awards and decorations of the United States government
