= Secretary of the Army Award for Valor =

United States Army award

- Medal reverse (right) and obverse (left) of the Secretary of the Army Award for Valor
- Type: Civilian honorary award
- Awarded for: An act of heroism or sacrifice, with voluntary risk of personal safety in the face of danger either on or off the job.
- Country: United States
- Presented by: the Department of the Army
- Eligibility: Army civilian employees
- Established: 15 April 2002
- Ribbon bar of the medal

Precedence
- Next (higher): Department of the Army Distinguished Civilian Service Award
- Equivalent: Soldier's Medal
- Next (lower): Department of the Army Superior Civilian Service Award
- Related: Secretary of Defense Medal for Valor

The Secretary of the Army Award for Valor is an award that acknowledges acts of heroism or bravery connected with a United States Army soldier or Army activity, or that in some way benefits the Army. The equivalent military decoration for this award is the Soldier's Medal.

== Criteria ==
To qualify for this award, an individual must have demonstrated exceptional courage or made significant sacrifices involving heroism or bravery. The act performed must be voluntary and go beyond the normal call of duty. It can be recognized if it is associated with an Army employee or activity, or if the Army benefits in some manner from the act. The award is reserved for acknowledging singular acts of heroism or bravery and is not conferred for participation in conflicts with an armed enemy. The situation must have entailed personal risk or danger and a voluntary willingness to put one's life in jeopardy. Awards are not granted solely for saving a life.

== Appearance ==
The medal is gold in color and 34.925 millimeters (1.3750 in) in diameter. The obverse depicts a five pointed star on top of a laurel wreath. At the top of the medal is inscribed "VALOR". The reverse of the medal has a small laurel wreath under a rectangular plate for engraving the recipient's name. The words “AWARDED TO” are inscribed above and parallel to the name plate. Below the plate are the words “FOR EXHIBITING BRAVERY”. The medal is suspended from a ribbon 35 millimeters (1.4 in), in width in red. In the center of the ribbon are five stripes of blue, separated by four stripes of white, the center blue stripe being wider than the others. This award has a neck drape or neck ribbon, similar to that of the Medal of Honor, and therefore is worn by the recipient in formal attire around the neck as the Medal of Honor. These are two of the four U.S. awards that are authorized a neck ribbon, the other ones being the commander-degree Legion of Merit and the Presidential Medal of Freedom.

== Known recipients ==
- James P. Stewart, for risking his own life on 30 November 2004 to rescue a Soldier following an accident where a streetcar struck a car in Leimen, Germany. He ran to the scene, ignoring the smoke and gasoline leaking from the gas tank and carried the injured Soldier from a dangerous and explosive accident scene to safety and administered first aid; presented 22 April 2005 at the Pentagon.
- Arden E. John, for selfless service beyond the call of duty on December 22, 2006. Mr. John risked his life to rescue a drowning man at a pond in South Korea. He went into freezing water and pulled one of the men to shore and administered CPR and continued to administer aid until medical personal arrived.
- Michael G. Cahill, for courageous actions at the Fort Hood shooting 5 November 2009; presented posthumously on 5 November 2010.
- Kimberly Munley, civilian police officer, wounded, and for valor at the Fort Hood shooting 5 November 2009; presented 5 November 2010.
- Mark Todd, Sr., civilian police officer, for valorous actions at the Fort Hood shooting 5 November 2009; presented 5 November 2010.
- Carl Marchlewicz, mechanical engineer, for bravery rescuing six children from a burning house on 7 May 2013; presented 6 May 2014.
- William Allis, fireman, for actions in saving two people from drowning on 6 August 2013; presented 5 November 2014.
- Sherman L. Fleek, Command Historian, U.S. Military Academy, West Point, NY, for bravery while disrupting an armed robbery at a restaurant on 31 May 2015; presented 25 May 2016 in the Pentagon.
- Robert L. Henderson, Army Corps of Engineers Natural Resource Specialist (Park Ranger) for disrupting and preventing a potential active shooter situation at Lake O' the Pines, Jefferson, Texas on December 29, 2016; presented 25 October 2017.
- Tanya C. Porter, Clinical Staff Nurse, U.S. Army Medical Command, Madigan Army Medical Center, Tacoma, WA, for selfless service and personal courage treating wounded passengers and directly saving at least two lives during the 2017 Washington train derailment; presented 1 June 2018 at the Pentagon.
- William S. Kiernan, Lieutenant, West Point Fire and Emergency Services at the U.S. Military Academy, for rescuing a victim from a submerged vehicle that crashed into a swamp, and rendering aid until further help arrived. Awarded Feb 2019 at the U.S. Military Academy.
- Robert Chase, senior fisheries biologist U.S. Army Corps of Engineers, Sacramento California District, for rescuing a driver from a burning car on November 9, 2023. Awarded September 5, 2024 at the Pentagon.

== See also ==
- Awards and decorations of the United States government
