= Department of the Army Distinguished Civilian Service Award =

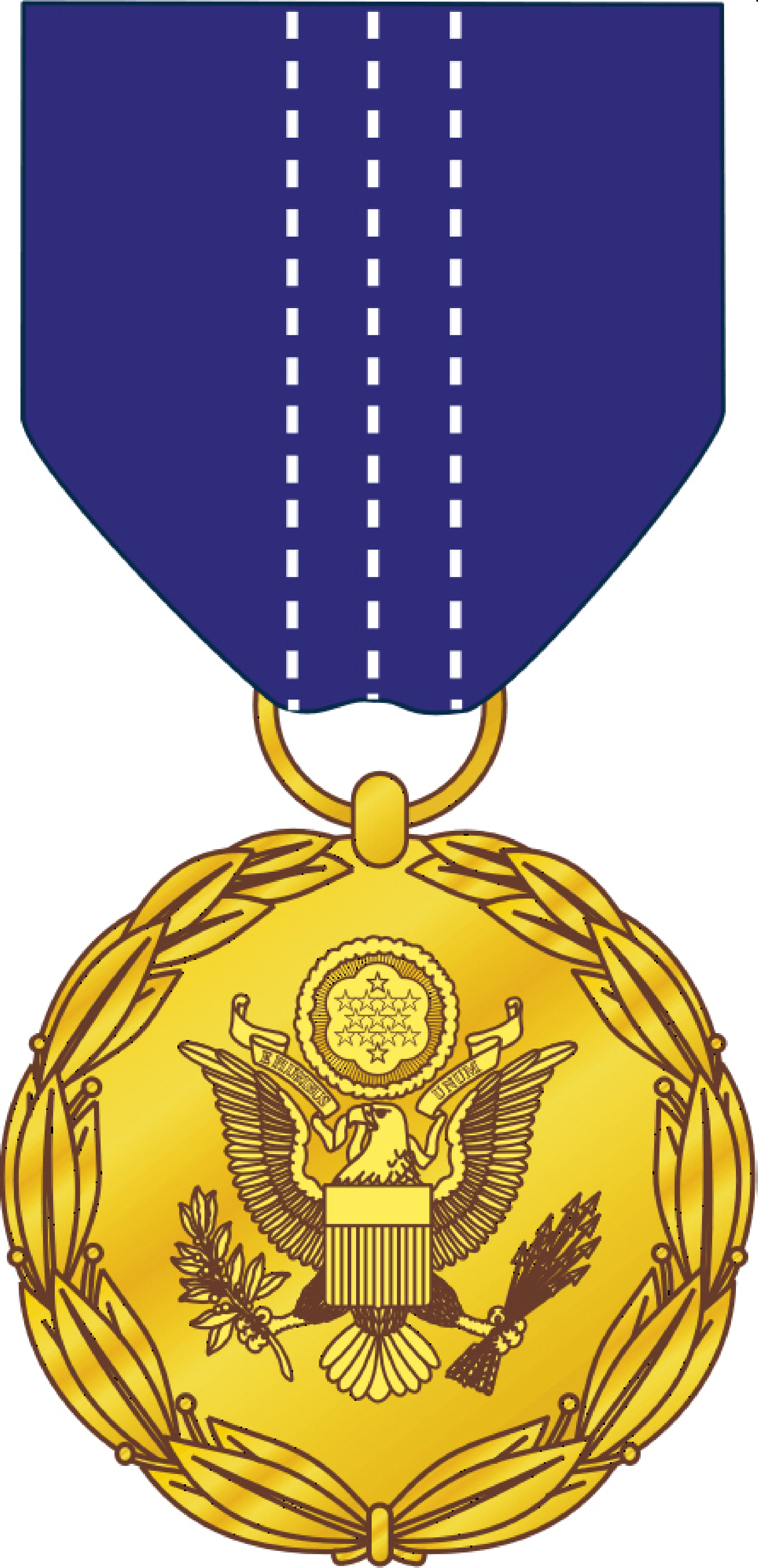
- Decoration for Exceptional Civilian Service
- Type: Civil decoration
- Awarded for: A pattern of achievement and excellence, which may have been previously recognized by awards up to and including the Meritorious Civilian Service Award.
- Country: United States
- Presented by: Department of the Army
- Eligibility: Army civilian personnel
- Established: 29 December 1945
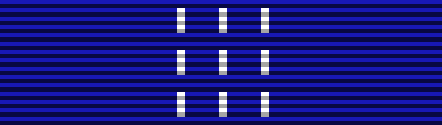
- Ribbon bar of the award

Precedence
- Next (lower): Secretary of the Army Award for Valor
- Related: Distinguished Service Medal

The Department of the Army Distinguished Civilian Service Award formerly the Department of the Army Decoration for Exceptional Civilian Service is the highest award that may be bestowed by or on behalf of the Secretary of the Army to Army civilian employees. The medal was approved by the War Department 29 December 1945. This award consists of a gold medal, lapel button and certificate. A ribbon bar and miniature medal is also available for private purchase.

== Criteria ==
Eligibility is determined by measuring contributions against the following example levels of achievement:

- Accomplishing assigned duties of major program significance to the Department of the Army in such a way as to have been clearly exceptional or preeminent among all persons who have performed similar duties.
- Developed and improved major methods and procedures, developed significant inventions, or was responsible for exceptional achievements that affected large-scale savings or were of major significance in advancing the missions of the Department of the Army, Department of Defense, and the Federal Government.
- Provided outstanding leadership to the administration of major Army programs resulting in highly successful mission accomplishment or in the major redirection of objectives or accomplishments to meet unique or emergency situations.
- Exhibited great courage and voluntary risk of life in performing an act resulting in direct benefit to the Government or its personnel.

== Description ==
The medal of the award is a gold disc, 38 mm in diameter. On the obverse in the center is a bald eagle similar to the Great Seal of the United States. The reverse of the medal is inscribed "FOR DEPARTMENT OF THE ARMY DISTINGUISHED CIVILIAN SERVICE--TO." The edge on both sides is surrounded by a laurel wreath. The medal is suspended from an ultramarine blue ribbon 35 mm in width with three thin white skip stripes in the center of the ribbon.

== See also ==
- Department of the Army Civilian Awards
- Awards and decorations of the United States government
