= Department of the Army Superior Civilian Service Award =

United States civilian award

Superior Civilian Service Award
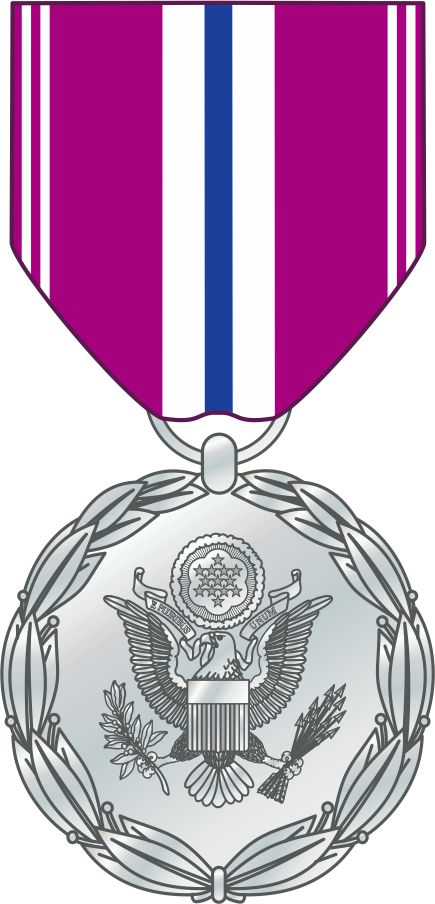
- Obverse of the post-2014 Superior Civilian Service Medal
- Awarded for: Superior service, achievement, or heroism
- Country: United States
- Presented by: Department of the Army
- Eligibility: Army civilian employees and direct/indirect-hire foreign nationals
- Established: 26 January 1959
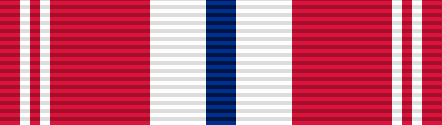
- Ribbon bar of the award

Precedence
- Next (higher): Secretary of the Army Award for Valor
- Next (lower): Department of the Army Meritorious Civilian Service Award
- Related: Legion of Merit

The Superior Civilian Service Award is the second highest award of the Department of the Army Honorary Awards for Department of the Army Employees. It consists of a medal, lapel pin and certificate. It is granted by Commanders of ACOMs, ASCCs, and DRUs; members of the SES serving as the director of a DRU; and the AASA for HQDA. May be further delegated to commanders MG and above or civilian equivalent and to Principal Officials of HQDA. The medal is the civil service equivalent of the military Legion of Merit. Originally established on 26 January 1959 as the Meritorious Civilian Service Award, the name of the award was changed to its current name in November 2014.

== Criteria ==
Nominations for this award reflect superior service, achievement or heroism of a higher degree than that recognized by the Meritorious Civilian Service Award. Employees who have shown excellent performance through the previous receipt of honorary or monetary performance awards, can be considered for this award. Eligibility is determined by measuring contributions against the following example levels of achievement:

- Accomplished assigned duties in a superior manner, leading team members to higher productivity, or completing a complex project more effectively and efficiently than required.
- Demonstrated a high level of initiative and skill in devising new and improved equipment, work methods, and procedures; inventions resulting in substantial savings in expenses such as manpower, time, space, and materials, or improved safety or health of the workforce.
- Exhibited courage or competence in an emergency, while performing assigned duties, resulting in direct benefit to the Government or its personnel. This award is comparable to the military Legion of Merit.

== Description ==
The medal of the award is a silver disc 1.5 in (38 mm) diameter with a laurel wreath around the circumference surrounding the Great Seal of the United States on the obverse. The reverse contains the inscription FOR DEPARTMENT OF THE ARMY SUPERIOR CIVILIAN SERVICE--TO. The medal is suspended from a crimson ribbon 35 mm in width with two thin white stripes near the edge and a central stripe of white bisected by a stripe of ultramarine blue in the center.

== Background ==
The medal was established as the Meritorious Civilian Service Award by directive of the Secretary of the Army on 26 January 1959.

In November 2014, the Secretary of the Army approved a modification to the Department of the Army Civilian Service Medals in order to make their nomenclature more consistent with their military equivalents. At that time the award was renamed the Superior Civilian Service Medal and the ribbon and design were changed. This award consists of a regular sized medal, miniature size medal, service ribbon, lapel button and certificate.

== See also ==
- Department of the Army Civilian Awards
- Awards and decorations of the United States government
