= SS American Victory =

Victory ship of WWII

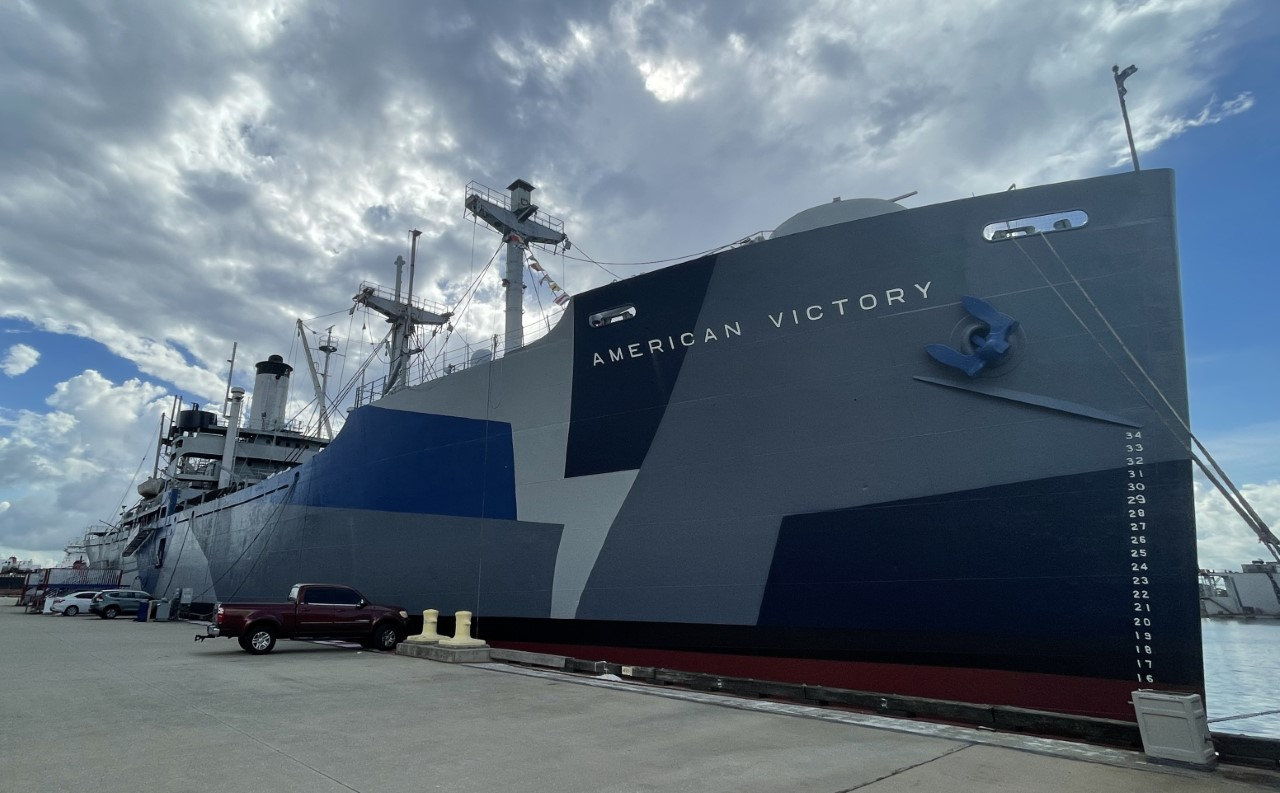

History

United States
- Namesake: American University
- Builder: California Shipbuilding Yard, Los Angeles, California
- Yard number: 272
- Laid down: 30 March 1945
- Launched: 24 May 1945
- Acquired: 20 June 1945
- In service: 1945
- Out of service: 1969 (Final)
- Identification: IMO number: 5014680 callsign: KKUI
- Status: Museum Ship, Tampa, Florida

General characteristics
- Class & type: VC2-S-AP2 Victory Ship
- Tonnage: 10,750 long tons deadweight (DWT)
- Length: 455 ft (139 m)
- Beam: 62 ft (19 m)
- Draft: 28 ft 6 in (8.69 m)
- Propulsion: Allis-Chalmers cross-compound steam turbine with double reduction gears; 6,000 hp (4,500 kW) at 103 rpm
- Speed: 17.5 knots (32.4 km/h; 20.1 mph)
- Range: 23,500 mi (20,400 nmi; 37,800 km)
- Capacity: 500,000 cu ft (14,000 m^{3}) (approximate)
- Complement: 40-62 United States Merchant Marine plus 25 United States Navy Armed Guard (during WWII only).
- Sensors & processing systems: Modern Surface Search Radar, fitted in 1980s
- Armament: 1 × 5-inch stern gun; 1 × 3-inch bow dual purpose gun; 8 × Oerlikon 20 mm cannon
- SS American Victory
- U.S. National Register of Historic Places
- Location: 705 Channelside Dr, Berth 271, Tampa, Florida
- Coordinates: 27°56′38″N 82°26′39″W
- Built: 1945, in just three months
- Built by: California Shipbuilding Corporation, Terminal Island, Los Angeles, CA
- NRHP reference No.: 01001533
- Added to NRHP: 4 February 2002

SS American Victory is a Victory ship that saw service during the final months of World War II in the Pacific Theater of Operations, the Korean War from 1951 to 1954, and the Vietnam War from 1966 to 1969. Built in June 1945, she carried ammunition and other cargo from Los Angeles to Southeast Asia, then ferried cargo, equipment and troops back to the U.S. after the war ended. She survived two typhoons and one hurricane.

American Victory spent part of the period between 1946 and 1966 chartered to commercial carriers and the other part in two stints in U.S. reserve fleets. From 1966 to 1969 she delivered cargo to Southeast Asia in the Vietnam War, then three decades again in reserve.

In April 1999, she was turned over to a preservation organization to serve as a museum ship. Today she is the main feature of the American Victory Ship & Museum, also known as the American Victory Mariners Memorial & Museum Ship in Tampa, Florida's Channel District.

== History ==
=== World War II era ===
Named after the American University in Washington, D.C., the ship was built at the California Shipbuilding Yard (Calship) in Los Angeles, California, launched after just 55 days, "fitted out" for another month, and was then delivered to the War Shipping Administration (WSA) on 20 June 1945. American Victory, a United States Merchant Marine ship, was operated for WSA under a general agency agreement by Hammond Shipping Co. Ltd. She loaded United States Army cargo at Fort Mason then took on cargo at Los Angeles and other west coast ports before steaming to Manila in the Philippines. She was in Manila when the war ended. She took her remaining cargo to Shanghai, China, and spent the next two months sailing the South China Sea and Bay of Bengal.

In November 1945, American Victory sailed to Calcutta and Port Said, Egypt and numerous other ports, loaded with military cargo to be returned to the United States. She arrived in New York in January 1946, and unloaded her cargo, having completed her first cruise. At the end of the war she ferried more cargo, equipment and troops stateside.

=== Post-World War II ===
From 29 June 1946 until November 1947, American Victory was bareboat chartered by American Export Lines. The ship carried foodstuffs and machinery exported from the United States to Europe, Russia, and the Near East under the Marshall Plan, the Post-War reconstruction of the European Continent. Some of her Ports of call were: Trieste, Italy, Constanza, Romania, Piraeus, Greece, and Antwerp, Belgium. Departing Odesa, Russia, for Boston, in January 1947, the Black Sea had already iced up. Not waiting for the Soviet icebreaker Turgenev to clear the ice, Captain, A. D. Cushman, knowing American Victory decided to use her as an icebreaker, backed up and rammed the ice so both her and other ships could depart the Black Sea. She was then laid up in the Hudson River Reserve Fleet until she was again chartered by commercial shipping lines, United States Navigation Company, during the Korean War, from 1951 until January 1954, when she entered the Sabine River Reserve Fleet in Texas.

In 1963, plans were made to convert American Victory and 14 other ships in her class to "forward depot" vessels, to be loaded with materiel and stationed near potential flashpoints to provide American forces with pre-positioned supplies. This scheme was cancelled in February 1966, after only three conversions had been carried out. Had American Victory been converted, she would have been renamed USNS Carthage and assigned hull classification symbol AG 185.

American Victory was removed from the Sabine River Reserve Fleet in 1966, and chartered to the Hudson Waterways Corporation which used her to ferry military equipment to American forces in South Vietnam. She was deactivated again in October 1969, and placed in the James River Reserve Fleet in Lees Hall, Virginia, where she remained until 1985. American Victory was then renovated as part of a program to determine the efforts needed to reactivate mothballed Victory ships. In June, after US$2.5 million had been spent to bring her up to fully operational condition, she sailed for just 26 hours before returning to the Naval Reserve Fleet.

=== Today ===
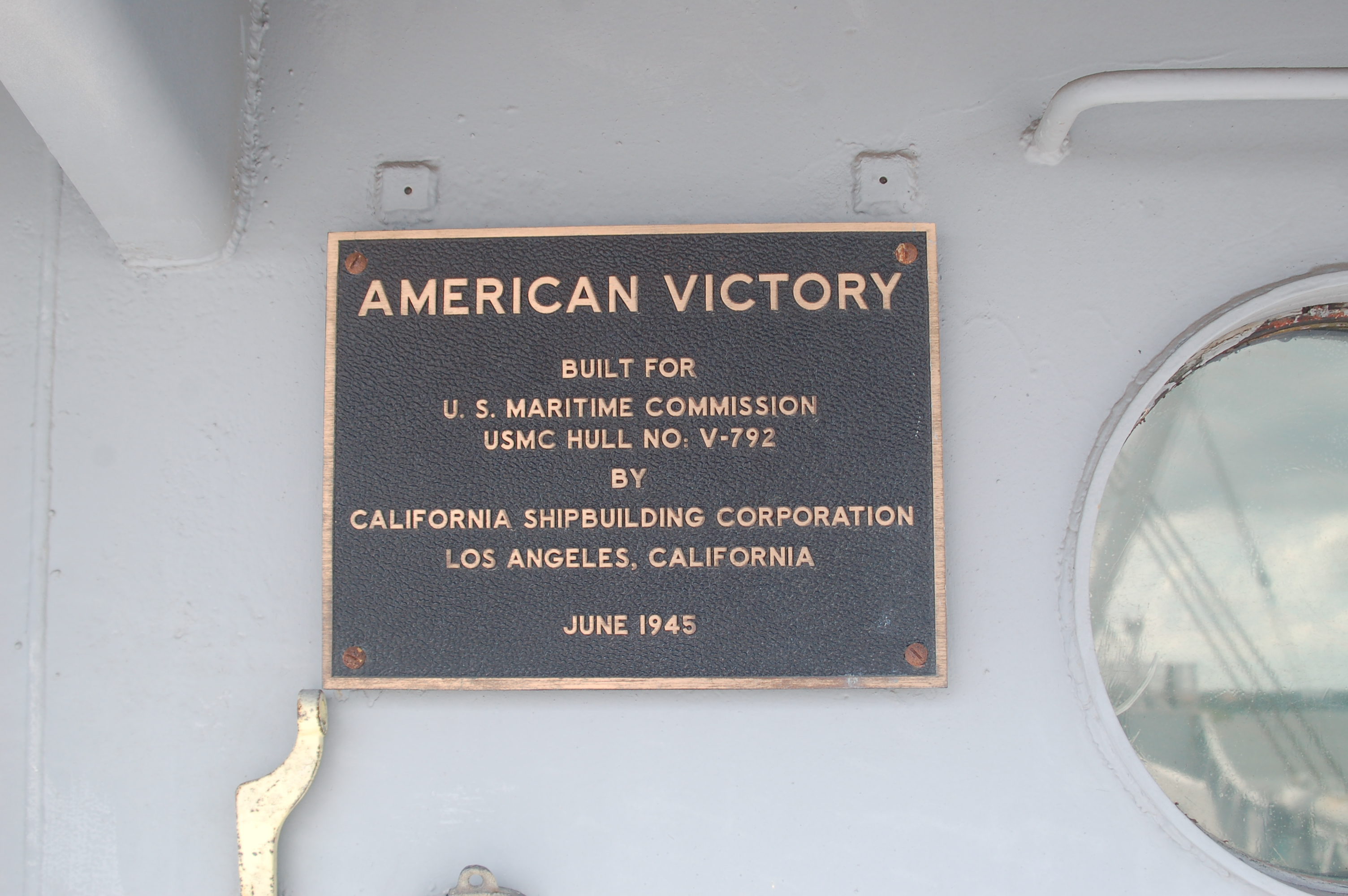
Name plaque

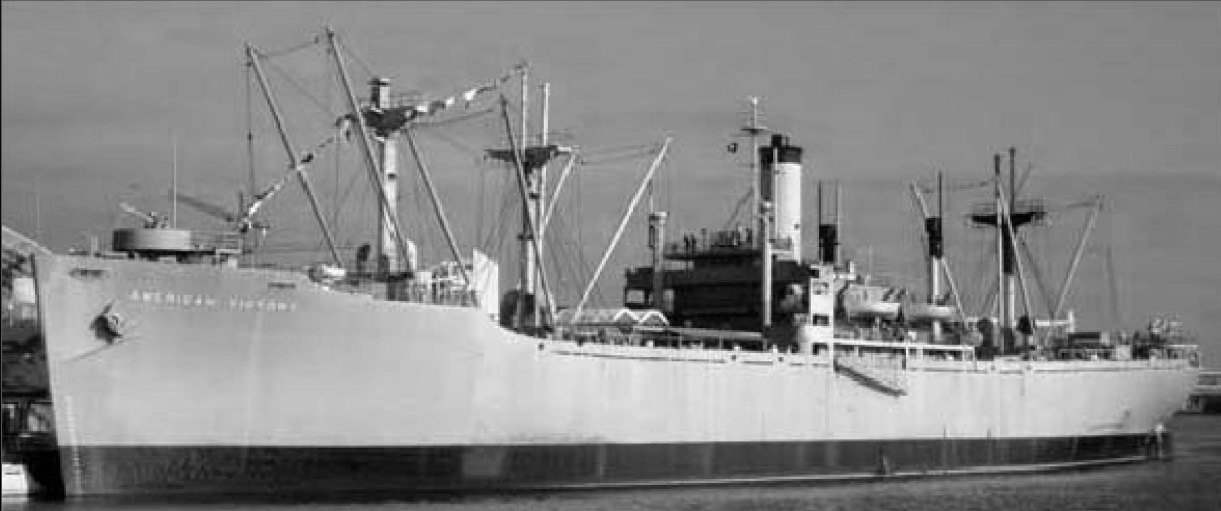
SS American Victory

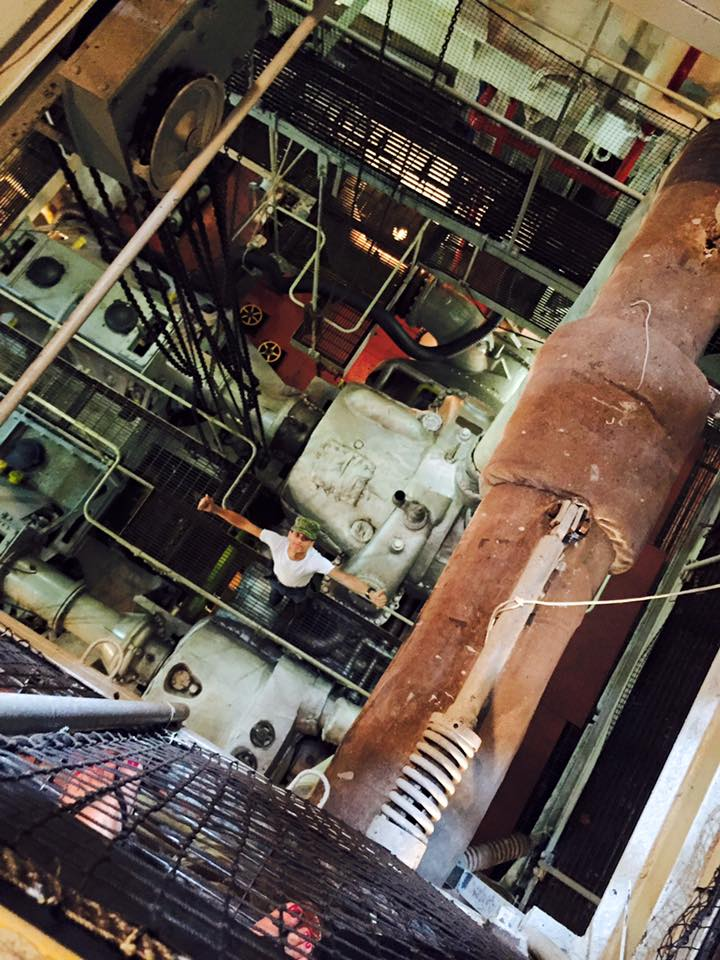
Engine room

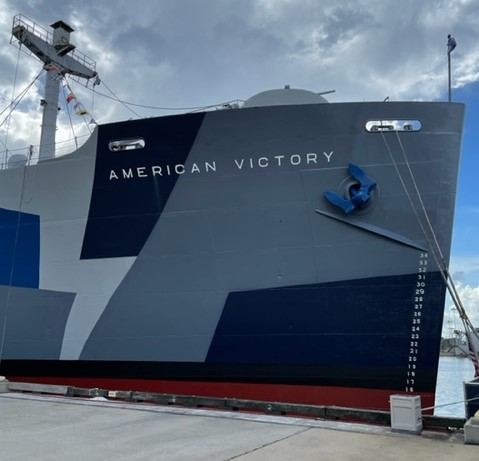
Bow

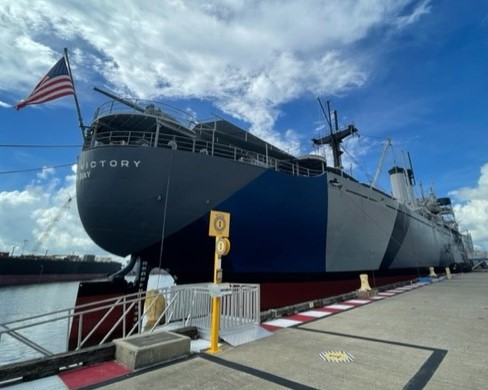
Stern

One of several World War II Victory ships due to be scrapped in the late 1990s, American Victory was rescued by preservation efforts which began in October 1998. She arrived at Tampa, Florida, under tow to begin her new life as a museum ship and memorial on 16 September 1999.

Following extensive overhaul with the ship brought to fully operational status in 2003, she is now on display and included on the National Register of Historic Places. Guided and self-guided tours of the ship are available, though some areas are off-limits for safety reasons, such as the lower areas of the engine room (which is visible from a catwalk). Most of the ship's spaces are open, such as officer, crew, and gunners quarters, galley and crew mess, three forward holds, wheelhouse and chartroom, radio room, hospital, and food cold storage, have been restored and are decorated in original period memorabilia.

American Victory has been upgraded with modern VHF radio and radar (visible on the bridge deck) and other modern electronics have been added to the electricians' quarters and radio room. American Victory is generally historic form, with her 3-inch (76 mm) bow-mounted deck gun in a reconstructed gun tub, as well as the 5-inch (130 mm) stern gun plus an additional 3-inch gun next to it.

American Victory is a fully operational, seaworthy vessel. With considerable preparation, she can cruise in Tampa Bay. The U.S. Coast Guard performs a safety inspection of the ship twice per year, she would not be open to the public without passing.

Of the 534 Victory ships completed, only three are open to the public: American Victory at Tampa, SS Lane Victory at Los Angeles, and SS Red Oak Victory at Richmond, California.

== Exhibits ==
The ship has many notable exhibits in the No.3 cargo hold, which was converted to a museum exhibit area and receptionist desk. It includes an original submarine propeller from the German submarine U-352, sunk in May 1942, by the U.S. Coast Guard cutter USCGC Icarus, and recovered in 1979. It includes photos of the shipwreck, a mannequin of a Kriegsmarine sailor in uniform, and a diagram of German submarine U-505. She also has numerous ship models, including a Clemson-class destroyer, a Fletcher-class destroyer, and a German Type VII U-boat.

There are also numerous vintage Merchant Marine recruiting posters, and a collection of Victory and Liberty ship's plaques, all of them sunk or scrapped. There is also a mock-up of the ships wheelhouse, and a lifeboat and Maritime Signal Flag exhibit.

== Ship awards ==
According to ship's records, the SS American Victory is authorized to display the following awards:

- Merchant Marine Defense Ribbon
- Merchant Marine Atlantic War Zone Ribbon
- Merchant Marine Pacific War Zone Ribbon
- Merchant Marine Mediterranean-Middle East War Zone Ribbon
- Merchant Marine World War II Victory Ribbon
- Merchant Marine Korean Service Ribbon
- Merchant Marine Vietnam Service Ribbon

== See also ==
- SS Maritime Victory, a similar VC2-S-AP2 Victory ship conversion into a dedicated troopship
- SS Lane Victory
- SS Red Oak Victory
