= Vietnam Civilian Service Award =

- Type: Military medal Service medal
- Awarded for: "Civilian service on land, sea, or airspace of Vietnam from 1959-1975."
- Presented by: United States Department of State
- Eligibility: Foreign Service, Civil Service
- Status: Discontinued
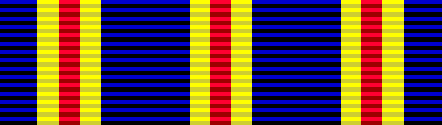
- Ribbon

Precedence
- Next (higher): Meritorious Honor Award
- Next (lower): Expeditionary Service Award
- Related: Vietnam Service Medal; Merchant Marine Vietnam Service Medal

The Vietnam Civilian Service Award is a discontinued award of the United States Foreign Service. It was presented to employees of the U.S. State Department, USAID and USIA assigned to diplomatic and consular facilities in Vietnam, or other civilian service in the airspace or territorial waters of Vietnam, greater than a year.

The award consisted of a medal set and a certificate signed by the Secretary of State.

== Criteria ==
The following criteria were applicable to granting an Award for Valor:

- Sustained superior performance while under threat of physical attack or harassment; or
- An individual act of valor or exceptional performance at the risk of personal safety.

== Military Use ==
American military personnel were ineligible for this award, as they were awarded the equivalent Vietnam Service Medal instead.

== Notable Recipients ==
- Lieutenant Colonel John Paul Vann, USA- Recipient of both the United States' military and civilian award for service in Vietnam; returned working for the federal government after his retirement from the U.S. Army.
- Ambassador Samuel R. "Sandy" Berger, for service in South Vietnam, 1968 to 1972.
- Chief Warrant Officer 4 Hershel Williams, USMC, Medal of Honor recipient.

== See also ==
- Awards of the United States Department of State
- Awards and decorations of the United States government
- United States Department of State
- U.S. Foreign Service
