= SS Lane Victory =

Victory ship of WWII

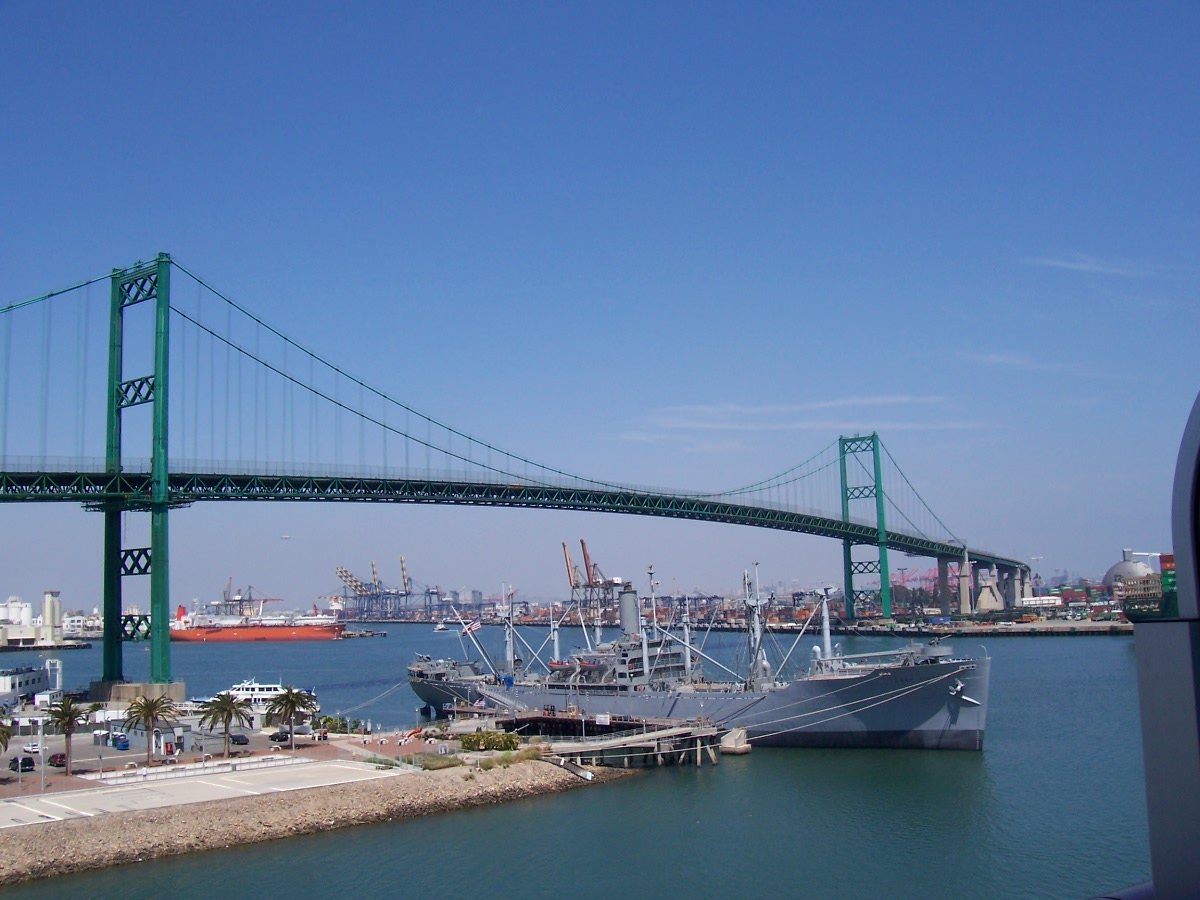
- SS Lane Victory at its previous berth by the Vincent Thomas Bridge.

History

United States
- Name: SS Lane Victory
- Namesake: Lane College
- Owner: American President Lines
- Operator: American President Lines
- Builder: California Shipbuilding (Calship)
- Launched: 1945 Los Angeles, California
- Maiden voyage: June 27, 1945
- In service: 1945
- Home port: San Pedro, California
- Identification: IMO number: 5203205; MMSI number: 366969950; Callsign: KECW
- Status: Museum Ship

General characteristics
- Class & type: VC2-S-AP2 Victory Ship
- Tonnage: 10,750 long tons deadweight (DWT)
- Length: 455 ft (139 m)
- Beam: 62 feet
- Draft: 28 feet 6 inches
- Propulsion: Allis-Chalmers cross-compound steam turbine with double reduction gears; 6,000 horsepower @ 90 revolutions per minute
- Speed: 17 knots
- Range: 23,500 miles
- Capacity: 500,000 cubic feet (approximate)
- Complement: 62 United States Merchant Marine and United States Navy Armed Guard
- Armament: 5-inch stern gun, 3-inch bow anti-aircraft gun, eight Oerlikon 20 mm cannon
- Aircraft carried: none
- Aviation facilities: none
- Lane Victory
- U.S. National Register of Historic Places
- U.S. National Historic Landmark
- Location within the Los Angeles metropolitan area Location within California Location within the United States
- Location: Berth 52, Port of San Pedro, San Pedro, California
- Coordinates: 33°43′02″N 118°16′24″W
- Built: 1945
- Architect: California Shipbuilding Corporation
- NRHP reference No.: 90002222

Significant dates
- Added to NRHP: 14 December 1990
- Designated NHL: 14 December 1990

SS Lane Victory is an American Victory-class cargo ship used in World War II, the Korean War and Vietnam War. The ship was preserved in 1989 to serve as a museum ship in the San Pedro area of Los Angeles, California. As a rare surviving Victory ship, she was designated a U.S. National Historic Landmark.

SS Lane Victory was named after Lane College, which was established as a high school for black youths in 1882 at Jackson, Tennessee, by Isaac Lane, a bishop of the Colored Methodist Episcopal Church in America.

== World War II ==
Lane Victory was built in Los Angeles by the California Shipbuilding Corporation and launched on May 31, 1945. On her first voyage, June 27, 1945, Lane Victory carried war supplies in the Pacific. The War Shipping Administration gave the operations of the ship to the American President Lines. United States Merchant Mariners operated the ship. The United States Navy Armed Guard, who manned the ship's guns, worked as signalmen and radiomen. She made two Pacific cruises, beginning July 10, 1945, to Manus Island, and the second starting August 30, 1945, to Guam, Saipan and Hawaii. The trip to Guam was to bring food to the island. On the way Lane Victory sailed through a typhoon and was tossed around for 14 days. On February 27, 1946, her second voyage ended. With the end of World War II, she started shipping aid. In March 1946 she started delivering goods to Europe under the Marshall Plan. With the end of the aid plan, on May 11, 1948 Lane Victory was laid up at Suisun Bay, California.

== Korean War ==
In 1950 Lane Victory was taken out of storage and by October 1950 was back in service. She was then deployed to evacuate Korean civilians and United Nations personnel at Wonsan, North Korea. During December 1950 she evacuated over 3,800 U.S. troops and 1,100 vehicles from Hungnam while under attack during the Battle of Chosin Reservoir. Lane Victory offloaded troops, vehicles and cargo as the cruiser USS Saint Paul and destroyers laid down a covering fire. After unloading she evacuated 7,010 men, women and children, taking them south to safety. When the ship arrived 7,011 passengers disembarked, as a baby had been born during the voyage. On October 10, 1953, she was laid up in Suisun Bay, California, storage. An annual Korean War tribute day is held aboard SS Lane Victory in honor of those saved.

== Vietnam War ==
In 1966 the ship was restored to duty again for the Vietnam War. She also saw duty during the conflict moving ammunition and supplies to and from the war zone in Vietnam. On April 29, 1970 Lane Victory was laid up again at Suisun Bay for storage in the National Defense Reserve Fleet.

During her three-war career, she traveled through the Far East Pacific, made a few transatlantic crossings and one circumnavigation of the globe.

== Post-war ==
Because of the ship's excellent condition in storage at Suisun Bay, the Maritime Administration decided to set aside Lane Victory for preservation. President Ronald Reagan signed into law H.R. 2032 on October 18, 1988, which turned over the ship to the United States Merchant Marine Veterans of World War II. Joe Vernick, John Smith and a group of Merchant Marine veterans had worked for years for the ship to be released from the Reserve Fleet.

Volunteers from the United States Merchant Marine Veterans of World War II worked for three years to restore the ship to working condition after she had sat, slowly deteriorating, in Suisun Bay for nearly two decades. Many upgrades were performed in order to bring Lane Victory up to Coast Guard standards. She was drydocked in 1992, and her hull was found to be sound. On September 10, 1992, her sea trials started and proved her seaworthy.

In May 1994 Lane Victory sailed south along the Baja Peninsula with the intention of joining the Liberty ship SS Jeremiah O'Brien on the 50th Anniversary of D-Day in France. On May 2, 1994, she passed the Sailing Vessel Blythe Spirit about 500 feet off the starboard side according to the day log of S/V Blythe Spirit. This encounter was just north of Cabo San Lucas. Before reaching the Panama Canal the Lane Victory had engine problems that prevented it from going across the Atlantic Ocean in time to arrive for the D-Day Anniversary. It was reported on the Maritime Mobile Service Net later in May that the Victory Ship had chosen to return after repairs were completed to a California port to await the return of the Jeremiah O'Brien.

In June 1994 Lane Victory participated in a mock Normandy invasion in the Santa Barbara Channel in celebration of the 50th anniversary of D-Day. In September 1994 she escorted the Liberty ship SS Jeremiah O'Brien from San Pedro to San Francisco in celebration of Jeremiah O'Brien's return from her voyage to Normandy.

On October 9, 2007, SS Lane Victory received a Special Heritage Award from the World Ship Trust in San Diego.

She serves as a training facility for the Los Angeles County Fire Department, Los Angeles City Fire Department, local law enforcement agencies, FBI, the U.S. Coast Guard and other United States Armed Forces.

- Of the 534 Victory-class cargo ships completed, only three remain working – SS Lane Victory at Los Angeles, SS American Victory at Tampa, Florida, and SS Red Oak Victory at Richmond, California.

== Museum ship ==
After her 1988 acquisition by the U.S. Merchant Marine Veterans of World War II, Lane Victory was towed to the Port of Los Angeles in San Pedro on June 12, 1989. She was turned into a museum and work ship again. In 1990 Lane Victory was designated a National Historic Landmark. A volunteer crew maintain and operate the ship and her two onboard museums. On September 13, 2000, Congress passed Resolution 327, recognizing SS Lane Victory as a representative of the service and sacrifices of the U.S. Merchant Marine to the nation during times of conflict: "Whereas vessels of the United States merchant marine fleet, such as the S.S. LANE VICTORY, provided critical logistical support to the Armed Forces by carrying equipment, supplies, and personnel necessary to maintain war efforts"

In February 2012 she moved from Berth 94 in Los Angeles Harbor by the Vincent Thomas Bridge to Berth 46 in Los Angeles Harbor at the end of Harbor Boulevard-Miner Street, south of the bridge. She was reopened to the public on February 17, 2012. She was moved, again, to Berth 49 in early 2013 as Berth 46 was being converted into a future super cruise ship dock.

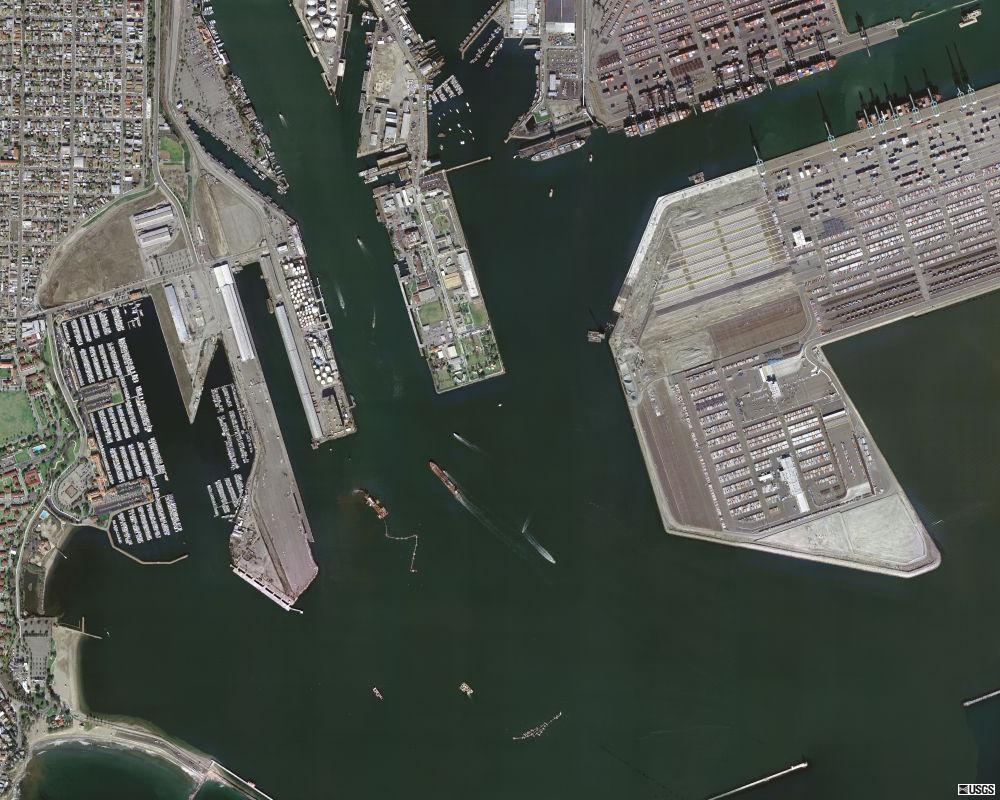
USGS Satellite picture taken March 29, 2004. SS Lane Victory is now at the near end of the dock on the left side. Berth 49 is to the left of the boat with the zig-zag white wake trail.

== Usage in Hollywood ==
Lane Victory has been used in a number of movies, TV shows and commercials because of her excellent working condition. The ship's wakes were used in the 1997 blockbuster movie Titanic for the titular ocean liner's wakes. She also served as the setting for the climax of the comedy film The Pest the same year. Other films in which the ship appeared are: Black Ops (Deadwater) (2008), Flags of Our Fathers (2006), GI Jane (1997), Pearl Harbor (2001), The Thin Red Line (1998), U-571 (2000) and Twin Sitters (1994) (note: this is a partial list)

The ship was featured in Visiting... with Huell Howser Episode 406.

Some TV shows she was featured in are: Alias, Baywatch, California Gold, JAG, Mail Call (episode #70), MacGyver, Murder She Wrote, the National Geographic Channel, NCIS, Port Chicago Mutiny (TV movie), Return of the Pirates (History Channel), Special Ops Mission and Unsolved Mysteries. In the Season 6 King of the Hill episode "Returning Japanese: Part 2" (2002), Cotton is sent back to the U.S. aboard Lane Victory. The History Channel series Mail Call episode 6/04, "Lane Victory", was an hour long episode about the ship and the World War II Merchant Marine,. (note: this is a partial list)

In 1999, the ship was used in a Ford Super Duty commercial and Disney's "Golden Dreams" commercial. (note: this is a partial list)

The ship was also used in the official music video of Alemeda & Doechii's song "Beat A B!tch Up".

The engine housed in Lane Victory's forward hold exhibit space was used as the engine for the fictitious gunboat USS San Pablo in The Sand Pebbles (1966).

== Awards ==
Lane Victory earned one ribbon for World War II service, two for Korean War service – United Nations Korea Medal & Republic of Korea Presidential Unit Citation – and one for Vietnam War service.

== Gallery ==
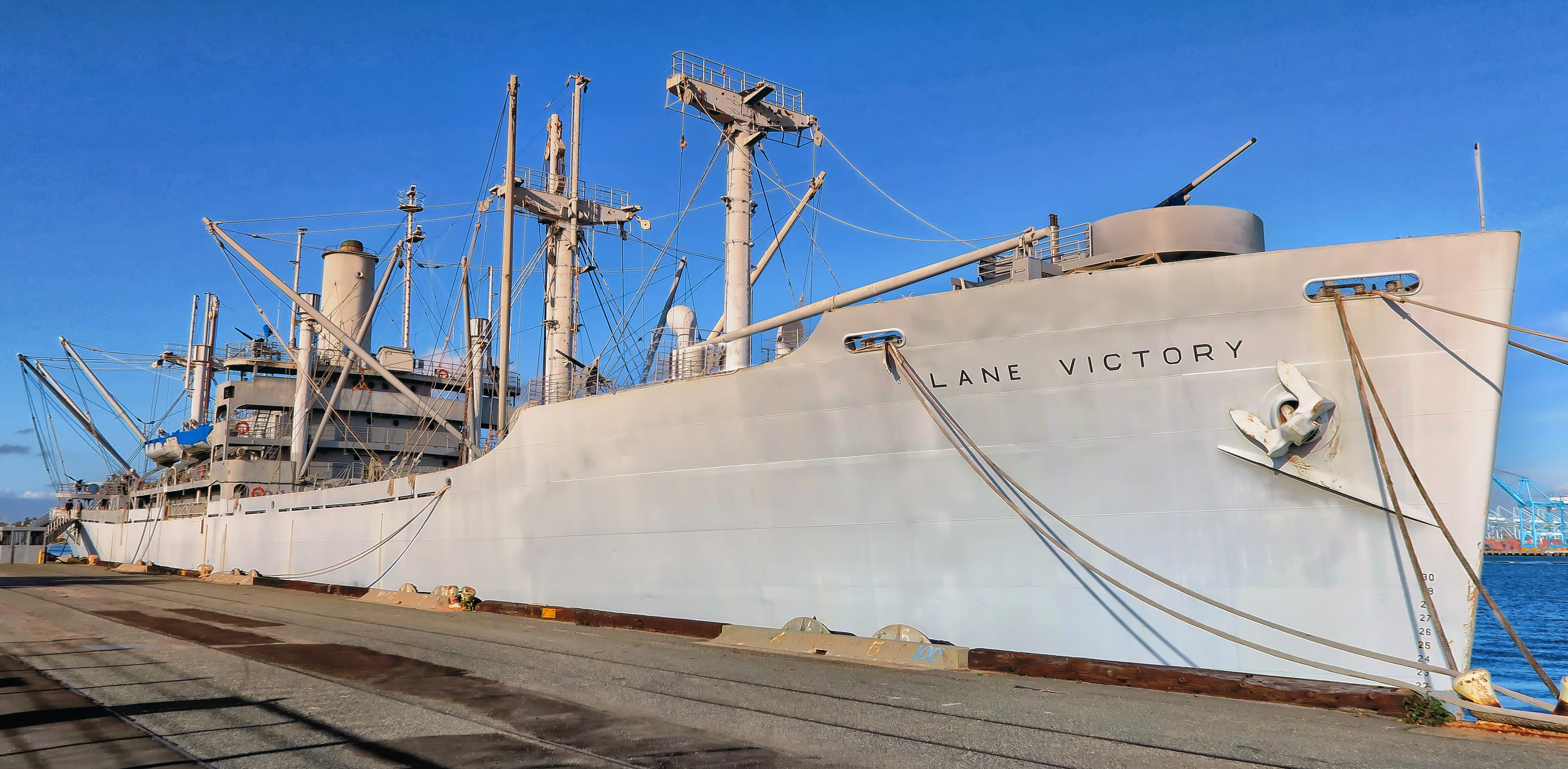
SS Lane Victory at the dock

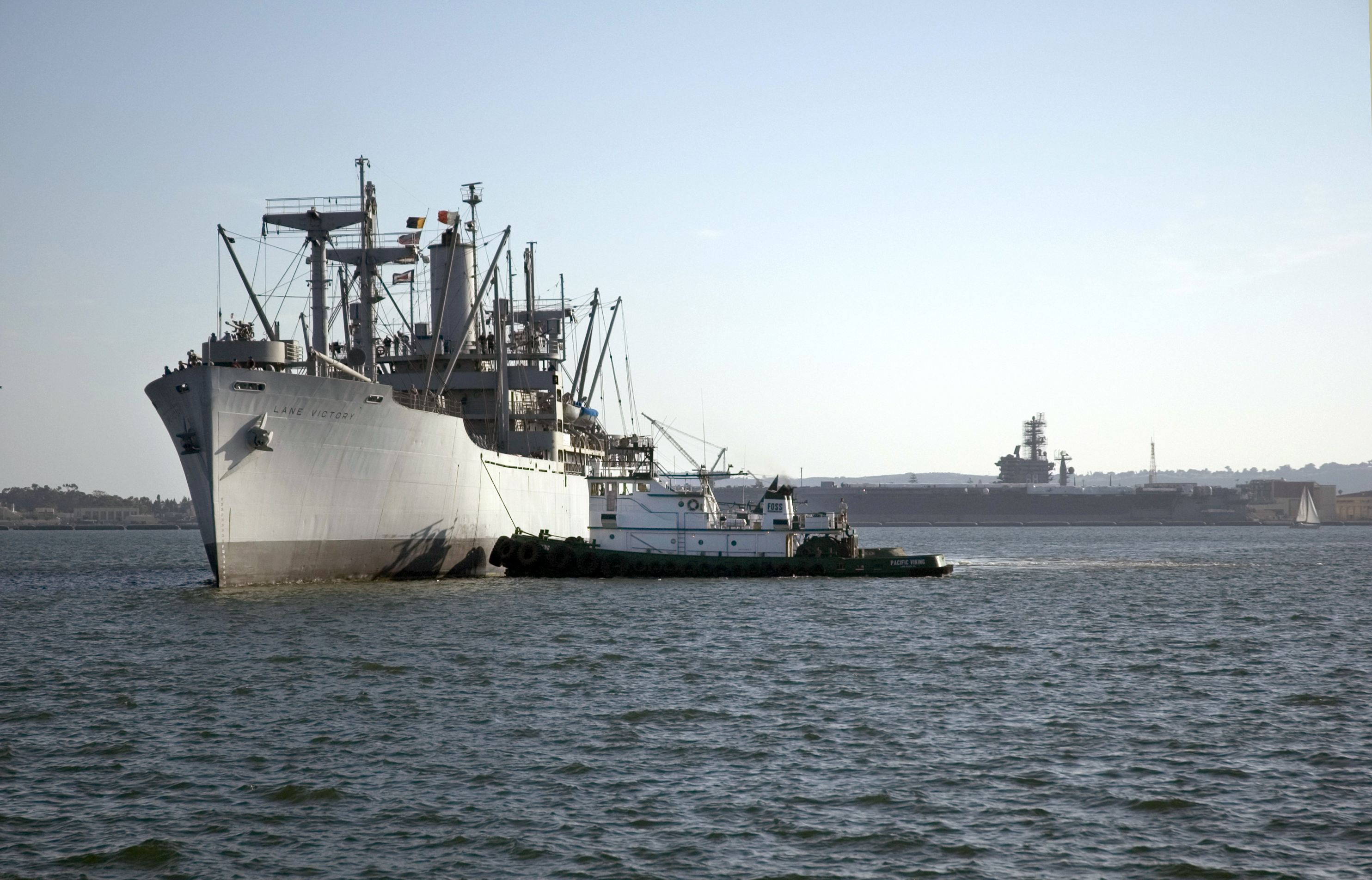
SS Lane Victory pulls into San Diego

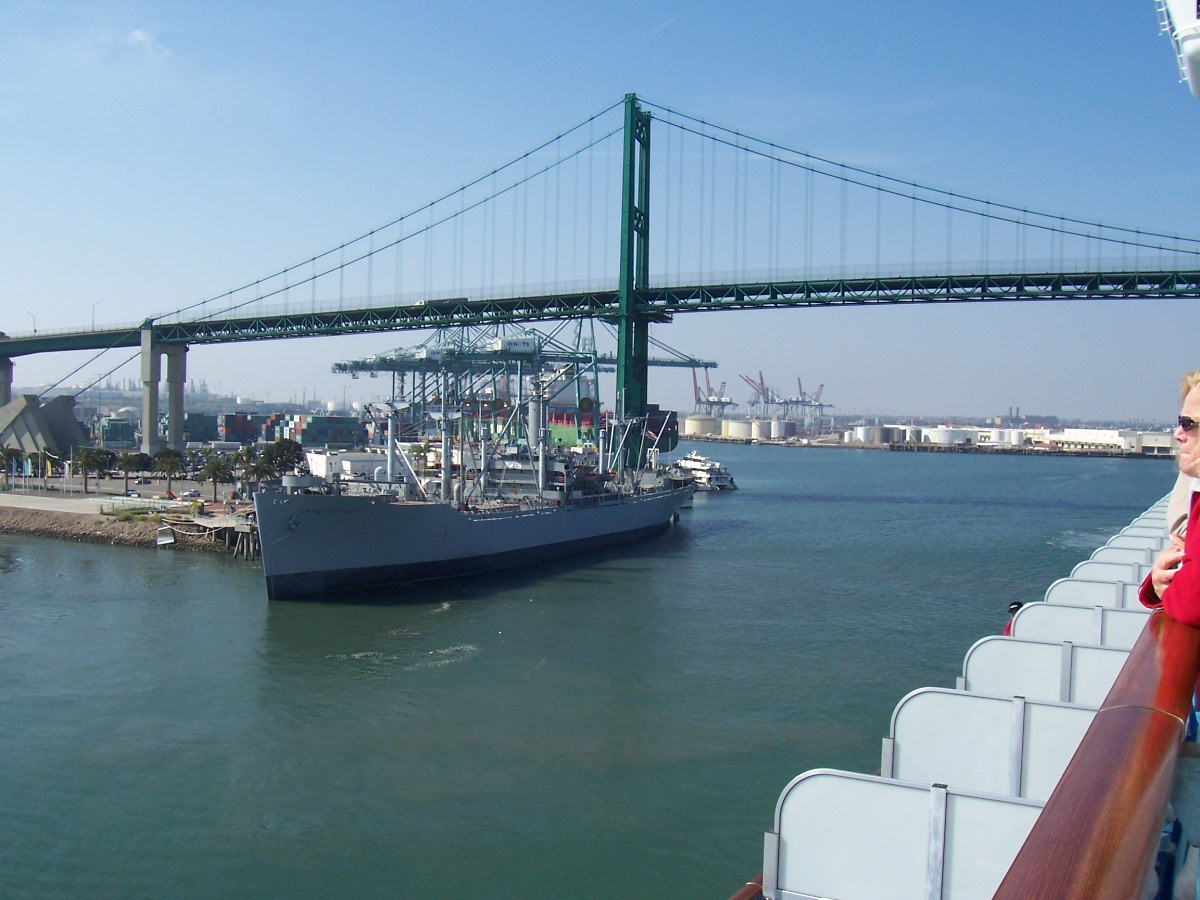
SS Lane Victory at Port of Los Angeles and Vincent Thomas Bridge

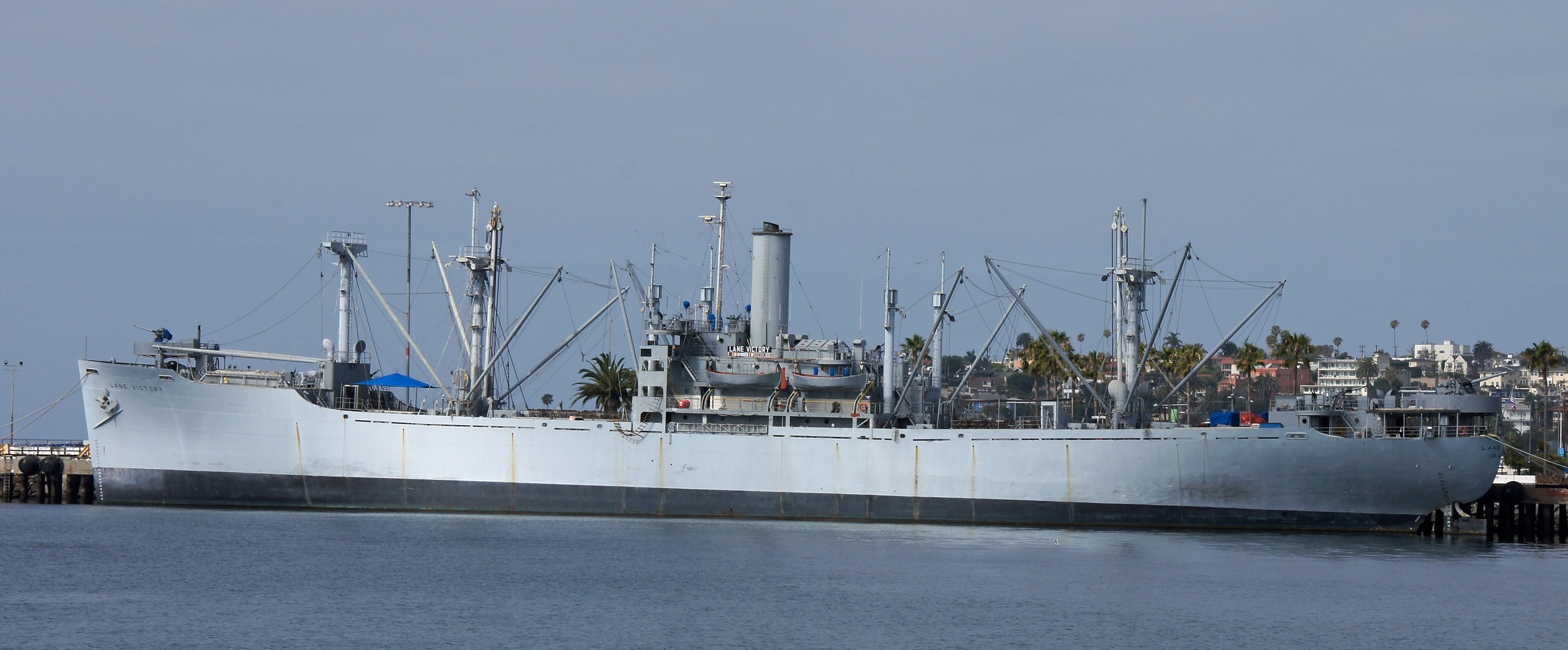
Side view of the ship from the water

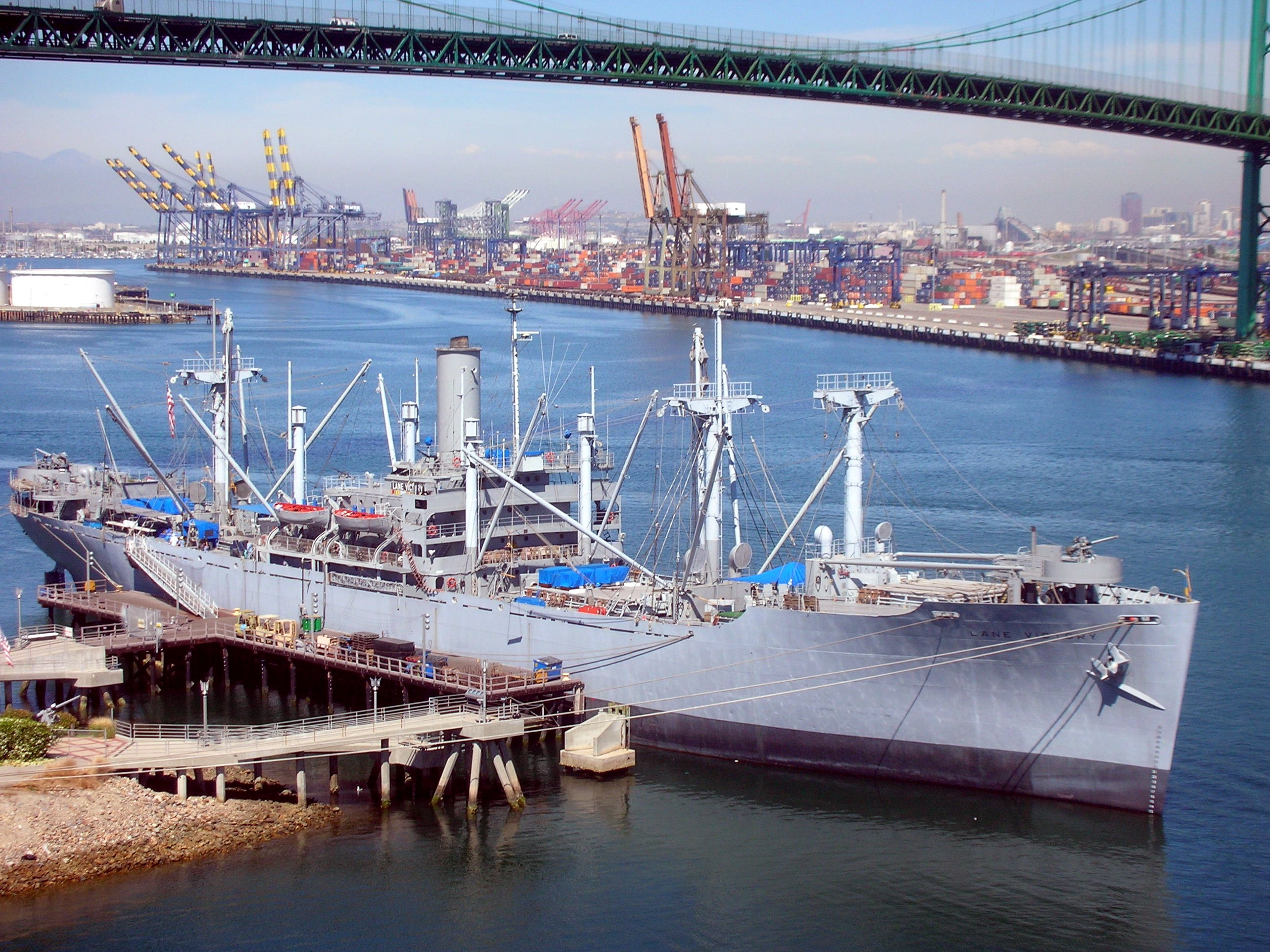
View of the ship and dock from the air

== See also ==
- SS Meredith Victory
- SS American Victory
- SS Red Oak Victory
- World War II United States Merchant Navy
