= Richard E. Benedick =

American diplomat (1935–2024)

Richard Elliot Benedick (May 15, 1935 – March 16, 2024) was an American diplomat who was president of the National Council for Science and the Environment. He was an ambassador and was chief United States negotiator to the Montreal Protocol on protection of the ozone layer.

== Education ==
Benedick was born in the Bronx, New York City on May 15, 1935. He received his AB from Columbia College in 1955, MA from Yale University in 1956, and a doctorate in business administration from Harvard University in 1962. He was also an Evans fellow at the University of Oxford, where he studied metaphysical poetry.

== Environmental affairs ==
Ambassador Richard Benedick has played a major role in global environmental affairs as chief U.S. negotiator and a principal architect of the historic Montreal Protocol on protection of the ozone layer, and as Special Advisor to Secretaries-General of both the United Nations Conference on Environment and Development (Rio de Janeiro, 1992) and the International Conference on Population and Development (Cairo, 1994).

After serving several years on Battelle’s International Advisory Board, he became, in 1998, Deputy Director in the Environmental and Health Sciences Division at their Washington D.C. office of Pacific Northwest National Laboratory (PNNL), and since 2001 was Senior Advisor to the PNNL-University of Maryland Joint Global Change Research Institute.

Since 1994 Benedick was also President of the National Council for Science and the Environment, an organization of about 500 universities, scientific societies, industry and civic groups dedicated to improving the scientific basis for environmental decision making. He later was a visiting fellow in 1995 at the Wissenschaftszentrum Berlin (Social Science Research Center).

His book, "Ozone Diplomacy: New Directions in Safeguarding the Planet", was selected by McGraw-Hill Education for an anthology of twentieth-century environmental classics and is used in universities throughout the world. It has been frequented cited as the "definitive book" on the Montreal Protocol. In 2005, he served on the National Academy of Sciences Committee on Analysis of Global Change Assessments. He currently focuses on climate policy and has promoted the concept of “an architecture of parallel regimes.”

== Diplomacy ==
A career diplomat, Benedick served in Iran, Pakistan, France, Germany (Bonn), and Greece. As Deputy Assistant Secretary of State for Environment, Health, and Natural Resources, he supervised policy formation and international negotiations on climate change, stratospheric ozone, biotechnology, tropical forests, oceans, wildlife conservation, and AIDS. Previously, he headed policy divisions at State Department responsible for global population policies and biomedical research, and for economic assistance and multilateral finance. In 1977, he was selected for the Senior Seminar, the U.S. government’s highest study program. In 1979, he was given the rank of ambassador by President Jimmy Carter. He has led many international delegations and testified before the U.S. Congress and foreign parliaments, most recently in 2005 before the Senate on science and environmental policy.

== Later life and death ==
Benedick was diagnosed with dementia in his later years, and moved into a care home in 2018. He died on March 16, 2024 in Falls Church, Virginia at the age of 88.

== Awards and publications ==
Benedick was elected in 1991 to the World Academy of Art and Science, and in 2002 to the American Academy of Diplomacy. He received the highest Presidential career public service honors (Distinguished and Meritorious Service Awards), the State Department’s John Jacob Rogers medal, and the 1997 United Nations Global Ozone Award and 2007 Twentieth Anniversary Ozone Award.

Other distinctions include two State Department Superior Honor medals; visiting fellow, National Center for Atmospheric Research; senior fellow, World Wildlife Fund; Stimson Fellow in International Relations at Yale University; Phi Beta Kappa; Tönisssteiner Kreis; and awards from the Academy of Athens, the Climate Institute, the Holy See, and Population Reference Bureau.

He has authored 120 publications in the U.S. and abroad, including "Industrial Finance in Iran", "From Amenemhet to Aswan: Transformation of the Nile", and articles or chapters published by publications of The American Assembly, American Physical Society, Aspen Institute, Max Planck Gesellschaft, National Academy of Sciences, and Scientific American.
