= Richard T. Arndt =

American diplomat and scholar

Richard Tallmadge Arndt
- Born: Richard Tallmadge Arndt; October 28, 1928 (age 97); Philadelphia, Pennsylvania, U.S.
- Education: Princeton University (A.B.); University of Dijon; Columbia University (M.A., PhD)
- Occupations: diplomat; scholar; author
- Employer: United States Information Agency (1961–1985)
- Notable work: The First Resort of Kings
- Awards: USIA Meritorious Honor Award (1963, 1966)

Richard Tallmadge Arndt (born 28 October 1928) is an American diplomat, scholar and writer known for his contributions to cultural diplomacy. He worked for the United States Information Agency (USIA) from 1961 to 1985, holding cultural-affairs posts overseas before serving in its policy-planning office.

Arndt chaired the Fulbright Association and Americans for UNESCO and in 2005 published The First Resort of Kings: American Cultural Diplomacy in the Twentieth Century, a study of U.S. cultural exchange programs. In 2025 the Lois Roth Foundation, in partnership with the Public Diplomacy Council of America, inaugurated the biennial Richard T. Arndt Award for an Outstanding Work on Cultural Diplomacy to honor his legacy.

== Early life and education ==
Arndt was born in Philadelphia and grew up around Englewood, New Jersey. He earned an A.B. in French literature at Princeton University (1949); studied at the University of Dijon on one of the first Fulbright grants to France (1949–1950); and completed an M.A. (1952) and Ph.D. (1959) in French literature at Columbia University.

== Academic and diplomatic career ==
After joining the United States Information Agency in 1961, which was then a part of the U.S. Department of State, Arndt served as a cultural affairs officer in Beirut, Colombo, Tehran, Rome and Paris. Between overseas tours, he completed a mid-career fellowship at the Woodrow Wilson School of Public and International Affairs (1971–1972). He concluded his government service in Washington, D.C., as director of policy and planning for the USIA's Bureau of Educational and Cultural Affairs (1980–1985).

During his diplomatic service, Arndt was awarded with USIA Meritorious Honor Award twice, in 1963 and 1966).

== After diplomatic service ==
After leaving USIA in 1985, Arndt became Diplomat-in-residence at the University of Virginia (1986–1989) and then adjunct professor at George Washington University (1989–1994), where he created one of the first U.S. graduate seminars devoted specifically to cultural diplomacy.

He remained active in the exchange community, serving as president of the Fulbright Association (1990–1992), as well as in Americans for UNESCO (2002–2006), which fought for US reentry into the organization.

In 1987 he also founded and became the first chair of the Lois Roth Foundation, a nonprofit that provides supplemental support for Fulbright projects, literary translation prizes, and awards for excellence in cultural diplomacy, the last of which is administered with the U.S. Department of State's Bureau of Educational and Cultural Affairs. The foundation, now chaired by his daughter, Dr. Skyler Arndt-Briggs, continues to administer scholarships, translation and book awards, and awards honoring cultural-affairs personnel and Foreign Service officers. As of the late 1980s he also advised universities, cultural organizations and foreign ministries on program design and evaluation.

Arndt's advocacy drew on policy work as well as scholarship. A 2005 report for the U.S. Department of State quoted his view that "a decent cultural diplomacy costs amazingly little, a shadow of the cost of one wing of fighter aircraft." In an October 2006 essay published in the Foreign Service Journal, "Rebuilding America’s Cultural Diplomacy", he warned that the United States had "unwisely left cultural and educational diplomacy to the tough mercies of the marketplace" and called for renewed federal investment in long-term exchange programs.

In 2011, Arndt was named Mestenhauser Distinguished Lecturer by University of Minnesota (2011). In 2016, he was awarded with Fulbright Association Lifetime Achievement Award. In 2025, he was awarded with Richard T. Arndt Award for an Outstanding Work on Cultural Diplomacy, which was established by the Lois Roth Foundation in partnership with the Public Diplomacy Council of America (2025).

== Personal life ==
Arndt has two children from his first marriage, with Edith Robichon, and two from his second marriage, with Dorothy Serlin. He founded the Lois Roth Foundation in the memory of his third wife, Foreign Service Officer Lois Wersba Roth (d. 1986).

== Selected publications ==
- Arndt, Richard T. (2005). The First Resort of Kings: American Cultural Diplomacy in the Twentieth Century. Potomac Books. ISBN 978-1-61234-239-9.
- Arndt, Richard T.; Rubin, David Lee, eds. (1993). The Fulbright Difference: 1948-1992. Transaction Publishers. ISBN 978-1-4128-2424-8.
