= USIA Meritorious Honor Award =

Military award

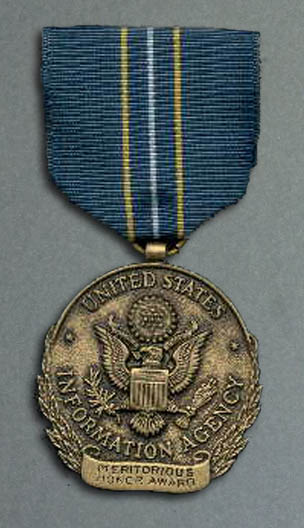
- Type: Medal
- Awarded for: "A special act or service or sustained outstanding performance"
- Presented by: United States Information Agency
- Eligibility: Foreign Service, Civil Service, US Military
- Status: Obsolete
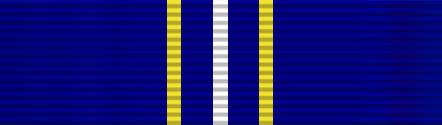
- Ribbon

Precedence
- Next (higher): USIA Superior Honor Award
- Next (lower): Expeditionary Service Award

The Meritorious Honor Award is an award of the United States Information Agency, an independent agency charged with public diplomacy which has since been merged into the Department of State. Similar versions of the same award exist for the United States Agency for International Development, the Department of State, and the former Arms Control and Disarmament Agency. This award has been replaced with the State Department's Meritorious Honor Award. This award was presented to groups or individuals in recognition of a special act or service or sustained outstanding performance.

The award consists of a certificate signed by an assistant secretary, an official of equivalent rank or the USIA Director.

== Criteria ==
The following criteria were applicable to granting a USIA Meritorious Honor Award:

- Outstanding service in support of a one-time event (e.g., support for a major conference or summit meeting);
- Innovation and creativity in accomplishing short-term tasks or projects;
- Outstanding performance in one or more areas of the employee’s official duties as defined in the Work Requirements Statement (Foreign Service) or Performance Plan (Civil Service); and/or
- Contributions that resulted in increased productivity and efficiency, and economy of operations at post or bureau level.

== Military Use ==
Upon authorization, members of the U.S. military may wear the medal and ribbon in the appropriate order of precedence as a U.S. non-military personal decoration.

== See also ==
- Department of State Meritorious Honor Award
- Awards of the United States Department of State
- Awards and decorations of the United States government
- United States Information Agency
- U.S. Foreign Service
