= Hershel W. Williams =

U.S. Marine Corps Medal of Honor recipient (1923–2022)

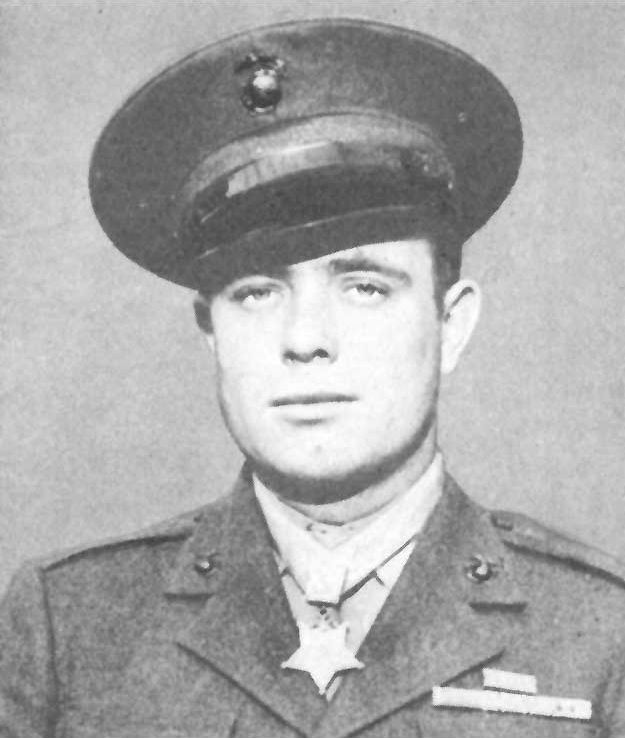
- Williams in uniform, 1945
- Born: Hershel Woodrow Williams; October 2, 1923; Quiet Dell, Marion County, West Virginia, U.S.
- Died: June 29, 2022 (aged 98); Huntington, West Virginia, U.S.
- Burial place: Donel C. Kinnard Memorial State Veterans Cemetery, Kanawha County, West Virginia, U.S.
- Military career
- Allegiance: United States
- Branch: Marine Corps Reserve
- Service years: 1943–1945; 1948–1949; 1954–1969
- Rank: Chief Warrant Officer 4
- Nickname: "Woody"
- Units: 1st Battalion, 21st Marine Regiment, 3rd Marine Division
- Battles: World War II; Battle of Guam; Battle of Iwo Jima
- Awards: Medal of Honor; Purple Heart
- Other work: Veterans' affairs
- Website: Woody Williams Foundation

Hershel Woodrow "Woody" Williams (October 2, 1923 – June 29, 2022) was a United States Marine Corps Reserve warrant officer and United States Department of Veterans Affairs veterans service representative who received the Medal of Honor, the United States military's highest decoration for valor, for heroism above and beyond the call of duty during the Battle of Iwo Jima in World War II. Williams was the last living Medal of Honor recipient from World War II.

== Early life ==
Williams, the youngest of eleven children, was born in Quiet Dell in Marion County, West Virginia, southeast of Fairmont, on October 2, 1923, and raised on a dairy farm in the area. At birth, Williams weighed 3 1/2 pounds and was not expected to live. His mother, Lurenna, decided to name him after the doctor who arrived at their farm several days after his birth. By the time he was 11, his father, Lloyd, had died of a heart attack and several of his siblings had died due to the flu.

Williams worked a series of odd jobs in the area, including as a truck driver for W.S. Harr Construction Company of Fairmont, and as a taxi driver. When Pearl Harbor was attacked, he was working in Montana as a Civilian Conservation Corps enrollee.

== Military service ==
Williams was drawn to the Marines by their dress blue uniforms he had seen several men in his community wear. He disliked the Army's brown wool uniform he considered "... the ugliest thing in town ... I decided I did not want to be in that thing. I want to be in those dress blues." Aside from the appearance of the uniform, Williams knew nothing of the Marines. Standing 5-foot-6, when Williams tried to enlist in the Marine Corps in 1942, he was told he was too short for service. After the height regulations were changed in early 1943, he successfully enlisted in the United States Marine Corps Reserve in Charleston, West Virginia, on May 26.

Williams received his recruit training at Marine Corps Recruit Depot San Diego, California. Upon completion, he was sent to the Camp Elliott training center in San Diego, where he joined the tank training battalion on August 21, 1943. The following month he was transferred to the training center's infantry battalion for instruction as a demolition man and in the use of flamethrowers. The training, Williams said, was technical and focused on the flamethrower's design: three tanks, two of which held a mix of diesel fuel and aviation gas, and a third tank that held compressed air. There was little training on the operational use of the weapon. "We had to learn that ourselves", he said.

Williams was assigned to the 32nd Replacement Battalion on October 30, 1943, and left for New Caledonia in the southwest Pacific on December 3 aboard the M.S. Weltey Reden. In January 1944, he joined Company C, 1st Battalion, 21st Marine Regiment, 3rd Marine Division at Guadalcanal. In July and August 1944, he was attached to Headquarters Company and participated in action against the Japanese during the Battle of Guam. In October, he rejoined Company C.

=== Medal of Honor action ===
Williams' next and final campaign was at the Battle of Iwo Jima, where he distinguished himself with actions "above and beyond the call of duty", for which he would be awarded the Medal of Honor. On February 21, 1945, he landed on the beach with the 1st Battalion, 21st Marines. Williams, by then a corporal, distinguished himself two days later when American tanks, trying to open a lane for the infantry, encountered a network of reinforced concrete pillboxes.

Pinned down by machine-gun fire, his company commander asked one of his men to attach a high explosive charge to a pole and, supported by Williams, his flamethrower and several Marine riflemen, shoved the improvised weapon into an opening in the enemy's pillbox. As they fought their way to the pillbox, all of the men, except Williams, became casualties. Undeterred, Williams arrived at the first pillbox, shoved the flamethrower nozzle into the pillbox opening and fired the weapon, killing all of the soldiers inside. He then returned five times to his company area, refueled his weapon, and moved forward to destroy the remaining pillboxes.

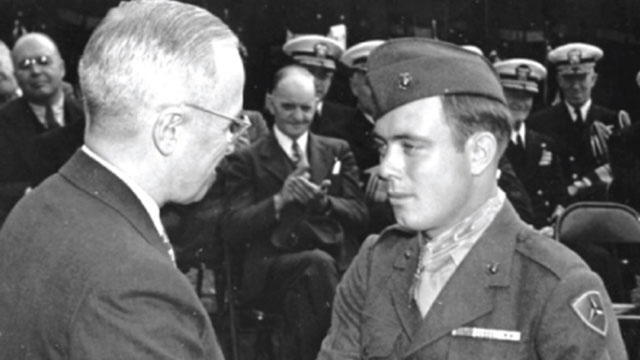
Harry Truman congratulates Hershel Williams on being awarded the Medal of Honor, October 5, 1945

Covered by only four riflemen, he fought for four hours under intense enemy small-arms fire and repeatedly returned to his own lines to prepare demolition charges and obtain serviced flame throwers. He returned to the front, frequently to the rear of hostile emplacements, to wipe out one position after another. At one point, a wisp of smoke alerted him to the air vent of a Japanese bunker, and he approached close enough to put the nozzle of his flamethrower through the hole, fire and kill the occupants. On another occasion, he was charged by enemy riflemen who attempted to stop him with bayonets; he fired at them with a burst of flame from his weapon and in a PBS America documentary "The Seabees on Iwo Jima" recounted how "It took all the oxygen from them..." which killed them. Williams said that much of the action "is just a blank. I have no memory."

These actions occurred on the same day that two flags were raised on Mount Suribachi, and Williams, about one thousand yards away from the volcano, was able to witness the event. He fought through the remainder of the five-week-long battle, even though he was wounded in the leg on March 6 by fragmentation, for which he was awarded the Purple Heart. Out of over 300 flamethrower operators deployed by the American military on the island, Williams was one of fewer than 20 to survive.

In September 1945, he returned to the United States, and on October 1 he joined Marine Corps Headquarters in Washington, D.C. He and thirteen other servicemen were presented the Medal of Honor by President Harry S. Truman on October 5, 1945, at the White House.

On October 22, 1945, he was transferred to the Marine Barracks, Naval Training Center Bainbridge, Maryland, for discharge. He was honorably discharged from the Marine Corps Reserve on November 6, 1945.

=== Post-war service ===
In March 1948, he reenlisted in the inactive Marine Corps Reserve, but was again discharged on August 4, 1949.

On October 20, 1954, he joined the Organized Marine Reserve when the 98th Special Infantry Company was authorized by Headquarters Marine Corps to be located at Clarksburg, West Virginia. He transferred to the Marine Corps Reserve's 25th Infantry Company in Huntington, West Virginia, on June 9, 1957, later becoming the (Interim) Commanding Officer of that unit as a warrant officer on June 6, 1960. He was designated the Mobilization Officer for the 25th Infantry Company and surrounding Huntington area on June 11, 1963.

He was advanced through the warrant officer ranks during his time in the Marine Corps Reserve until reaching his final rank of Chief Warrant Officer 4. Although Williams technically did not meet retirement requirements, he was honorarily retired from the Marine Corps Reserve in 1969 after approximately 17 years of service.

== Civil service ==
After World War II, Williams served as a United States Department of Veterans Affairs veterans service representative, retiring after 33 years federal service.

== Personal life ==
Williams was a member of The American Legion, Congressional Medal of Honor Society, Marine Corps League, and Sons of the American Revolution. His medal of honor is on display at the Pritzker Military Museum & Library in Chicago. For years, Williams struggled with post-traumatic stress until 1962, when he experienced a religious renewal. In a 2020 Washington Post interview remembering the 75th anniversary of the Iwo Jima battle, he credited his religious awakening with ending his nightmares and transforming his life.

It's one of those things you put in the recess of your mind. You were fulfilling an obligation that you swore to do, to defend your country. Anytime you take a life, there's always some aftermath to that if you've got any heart at all.

In 2021, Woody Williams attended the graduation from boot camp in the United States Marine Corps of his great-grandson Cedar Ross.

The advice he gave his great-grandson was "to do the very best he could and then to do a little more".

== Death ==
Williams died at the Hershel "Woody" Williams Veterans Affairs Medical Center in Huntington, West Virginia, on June 29, 2022, at the age of 98. He was the last surviving Medal of Honor recipient from World War II. On July 14, 2022, Williams' remains lay in honor at the U.S. Capitol Rotunda.

== Awards and decorations ==
Williams' military decorations and awards include:

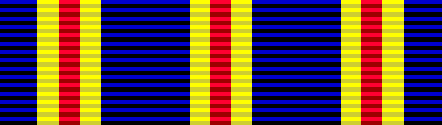

1st row	Medal of Honor		Purple Heart
2nd row	Navy Presidential Unit Citation	Navy Unit Commendation	Selected Marine Corps Reserve Medal with two service stars
3rd row	Vietnam Civilian Service Award	American Campaign Medal	Asiatic-Pacific Campaign Medal with two 3/16" bronze stars
4th row	World War II Victory Medal	National Defense Service Medal	West Virginia Distinguished Service Medal

=== Medal of Honor citation ===
Williams' Medal of Honor citation reads:

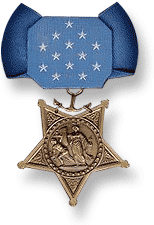

The President of the United States in the name of The Congress takes pleasure in presenting the
MEDAL OF HONOR
to
CORPORAL HERSHEL W. WILLIAMS
UNITED STATES MARINE CORPS RESERVE

for service as set forth in the following
CITATION:

For conspicuous gallantry and intrepidity at the risk of his life above and beyond the call of duty as Demolition Sergeant serving with the First Battalion, Twenty-First Marines, Third Marine Division, in action against enemy Japanese forces on Iwo Jima, Volcano Island, 23 February 1945. Quick to volunteer his services when our tanks were maneuvering vainly to open a lane for the infantry through the network of reinforced concrete pillboxes, buried mines and black, volcanic sands, Corporal Williams daringly went forward alone to attempt the reduction of devastating machine-gun fire from the unyielding positions. Covered only by four riflemen, he fought desperately for four hours under terrific enemy small-arms fire and repeatedly returned to his own lines to prepare demolition charges and obtain serviced flame throwers, struggling back, frequently to the rear of hostile emplacements, to wipe out one position after another. On one occasion he daringly mounted a pillbox to insert the nozzle of his flame thrower through the air vent, kill the occupants and silence the gun; on another he grimly charged enemy riflemen who attempted to stop him with bayonets and destroyed them with a burst of flame from his weapon. His unyielding determination and extraordinary heroism in the face of ruthless enemy resistance were directly instrumental in neutralizing one of the most fanatically defended Japanese strong points encountered by his regiment and aided in enabling his company to reach its' [sic] objective. Corporal Williams' aggressive fighting spirit and valiant devotion to duty throughout this fiercely contested action sustain and enhance the highest traditions of the United States Naval Service.

/S/ HARRY S. TRUMAN

== Legacy and honors ==
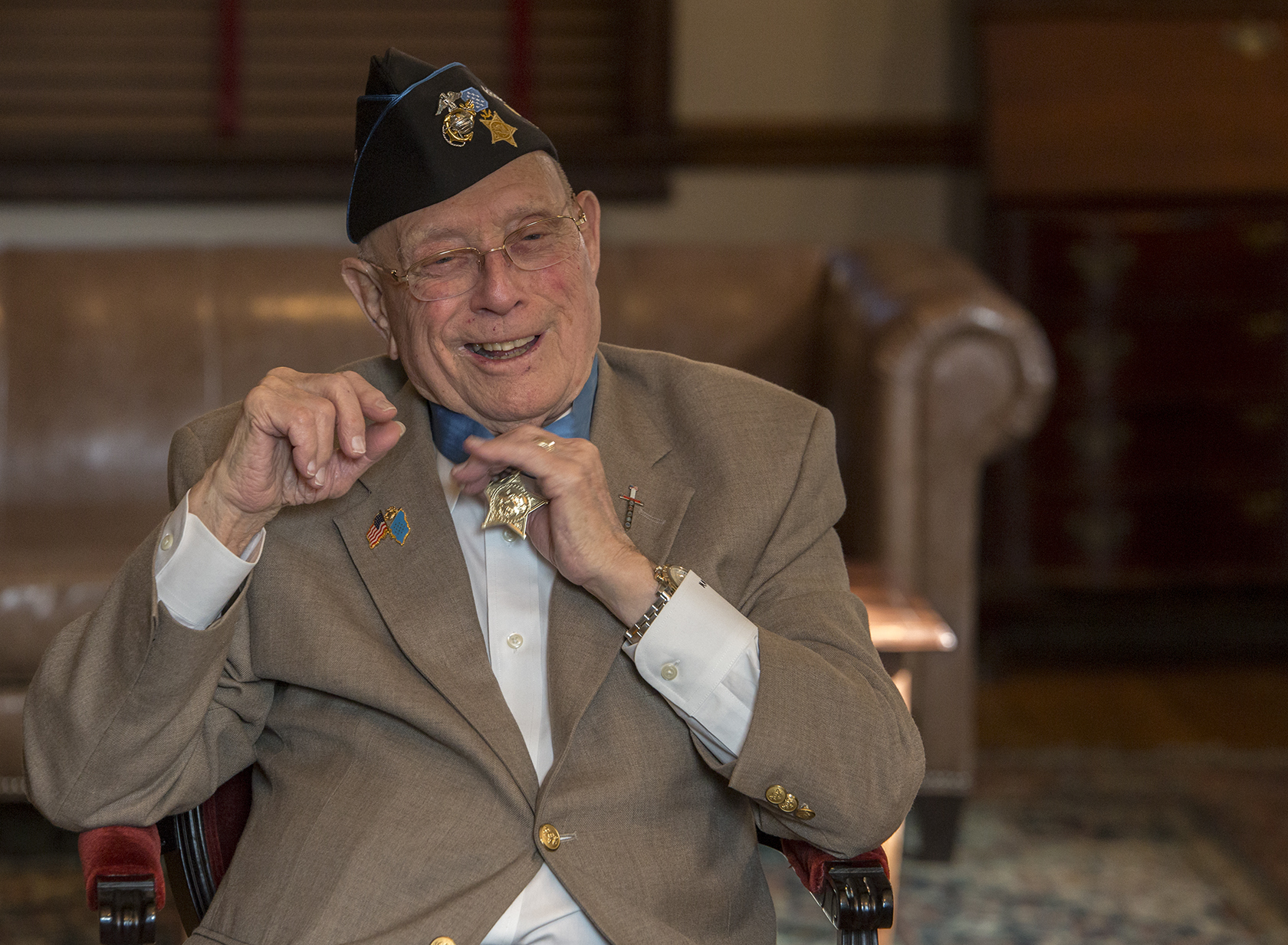
Williams in February 2018

In 1965, Williams received West Virginia's Distinguished Service Medal. In 1967, he was honored by the Veteran's Administration with the Civilian Vietnam Service Award for service as a civilian counselor to the armed forces. In 1999, he was added to the City of Huntington Foundation's "Wall of Fame". He received the 2014 Founder's Award for extraordinary contributions to the mission of the Pritzker Military Museum & Library and the preservation of the heritage of the Citizen Soldier.

The West Virginia state legislature has included Williams in the Hall of Fame for the state named him a Distinguished West Virginian in 1980 and in 2013. During a special State Legislative Session in 2024, a resolution was passed providing for the replacement of one of the two West Virginia statues in the National Statuary Hall Collection in Washington D.C. with a statue of Williams. He is on the “Wall of Fame” in the Civic Center in the city of Huntington, West Virginia, nominated and selected by the former recipients who received this honor. In his hometown of Fairmont, West Virginia, the 32 million dollar Hershel “Woody” Williams Armed Forces Reserve Center is the only National Guard facility in the country named after a Marine.

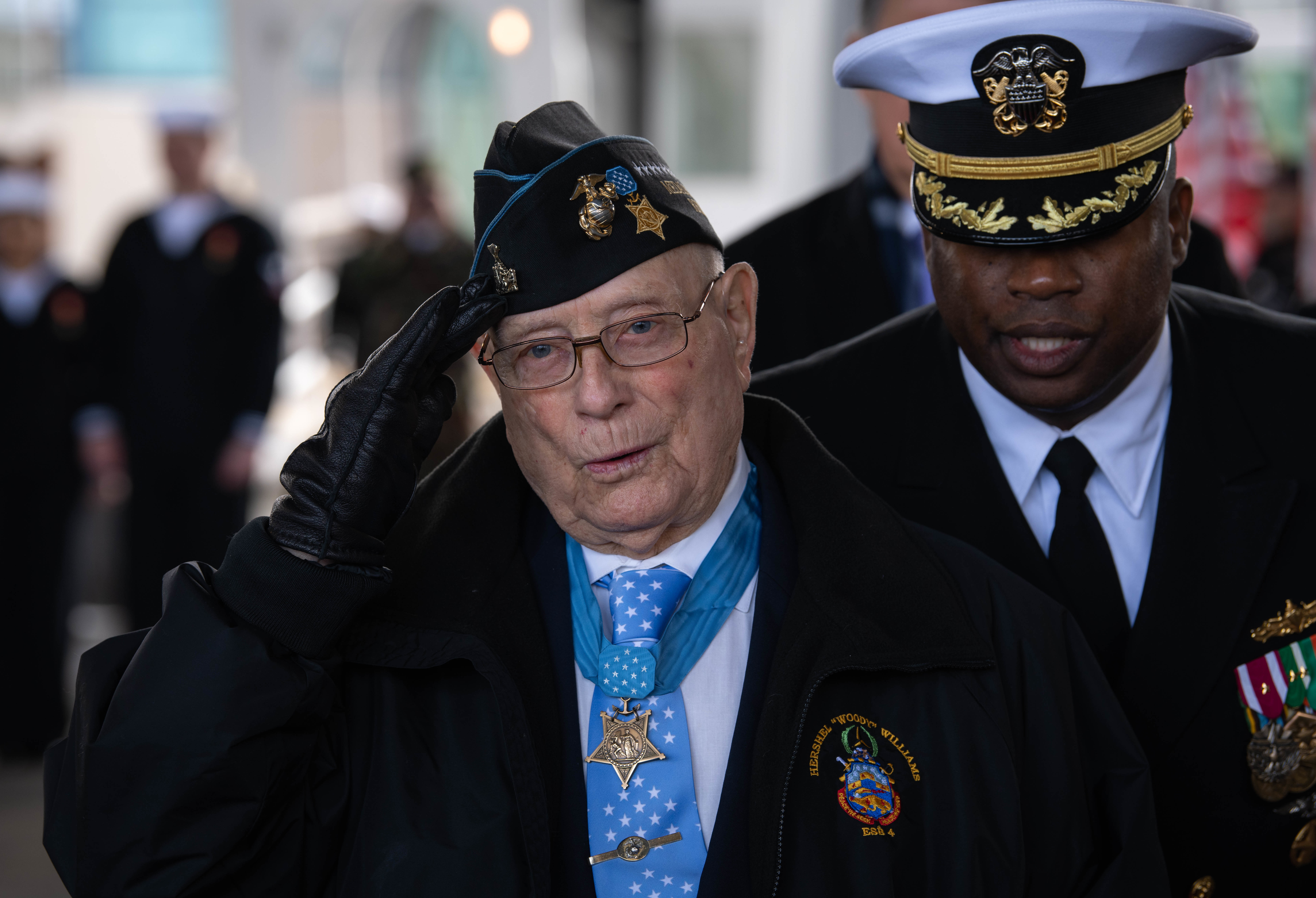
Williams in March 2020

In 2010, the not-for-profit Hershel Woody Williams Congressional Medal of Honor Education Foundation, Inc. was established "to honor Gold Star Families, relatives, and Gold Star Children who have sacrificed a loved one in the service of their country." Williams served on the foundation's Founders Advisory Board.

On February 4, 2018, Williams along with 14 other living Medal of Honor recipients was honored at the Super Bowl LII during the coin toss. Williams was selected to do the official coin toss for the game. The coin toss ceremony set a record for most coin toss participants as Super Bowl LII was dedicated to them.

Named in his honor:

- Hershel "Woody" Williams VA Medical Center in Huntington, West Virginia
- Hershel "Woody" Williams VFW (Veterans of Foreign Wars) Post 7048 in Fairmont, West Virginia
- West Virginia National Guard Armory in Fairmont, West Virginia
- Bridge at Barboursville, West Virginia
- Athletic field at Huntington, West Virginia
- USS Hershel "Woody" Williams (ESB-4), a Mobile Landing Platform built by General Dynamics NASSCO at their San Diego shipyard. In August 2016, Williams was joined by Edward Byers at the ship's keel laying ceremony.
  - On March 7, 2020, Williams was present for the ship commissioning ceremony.

== See also ==
- List of Medal of Honor recipients for the Battle of Iwo Jima
- List of Medal of Honor recipients for World War II
- List of members of the American Legion

== Notes ==
Honorary titles
Preceded by Don Young	Persons who have lain in state or honor in the United States Capitol rotunda July 14, 2022	Succeeded by Jimmy Carter
