= USAID Distinguished Honor Award =

US government prize

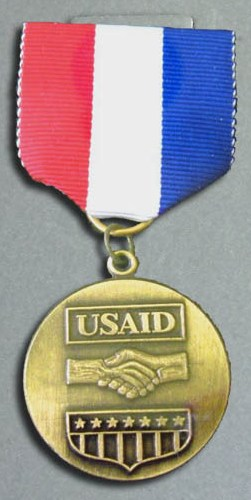
- Type: Military medal
- Awarded for: "Exceptionally outstanding service or achievements of marked national or international significance"
- Presented by: United States Agency for International Development
- Eligibility: Foreign Service, Civil Service, US Military
- Status: Currently awarded
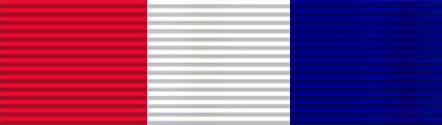
- Ribbon

Precedence
- Next (higher): Thomas Jefferson Star for Foreign Service
- Next (lower): USAID Superior Honor Award

The Distinguished Honor Award is an award of the United States Agency for International Development. Similar versions of the same award exist for the former U.S. Information Agency, Arms Control and Disarmament Agency, and Department of State. It is presented to groups or individuals in recognition of exceptionally outstanding service or achievements of marked national or international significance.

The award consists of a gold medal set and a certificate signed by an assistant secretary, an official of equivalent rank or the Mission Director. Due to the demanding nature of the criteria, the award is not routinely issued.

== Criteria ==
The following criteria are applicable to granting a Distinguished Honor Award:

- Exceptionally outstanding service to the agencies or the U.S. Government resulting in achievements of marked national or international significance;
- Exceptionally outstanding service and/or leadership in the administration of one or more agency programs that results in the highly successful accomplishment of mission, or in a major attainment of objectives or specific accomplishment to meet unique or emergency situations; and
- Outstanding accomplishments over a prolonged period that involve the exercise of authority or judgment in the public interest.

== Nominating and approval procedures ==
Nominations for USAID employees are submitted on Form JF-66, Nomination for Award, through supervisory channels to the Joint Country Awards Committee for review and recommendation to the Mission Director for final action.

Nominations initiated in Washington are reviewed by the USAID bureau/office with final approval by the appropriate assistant administrator or office head.

== Military use ==
Upon authorization, members of the U.S. military may wear the medal and ribbon in the appropriate order of precedence as a U.S. non-military personal decoration.

== See also ==
- Department of State Distinguished Honor Award
- Awards of the United States Department of State
- Awards and decorations of the United States government
- United States Department of State
- U.S. Foreign Service
