= USAID Superior Honor Award =

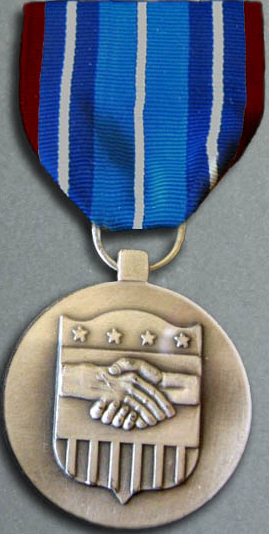
- USAID Superior Honor Award medal
- Type: Military medal
- Awarded for: "A special act or service or sustained extraordinary performance covering a period of one year or longer"
- Presented by: United States Agency for International Development
- Eligibility: Foreign Service, Civil Service, US Military
- Status: Currently awarded
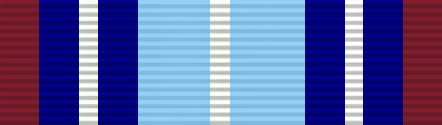
- Ribbon

Precedence
- Next (higher): USAID Distinguished Honor Award
- Next (lower): USAID Meritorious Honor Award

The Superior Honor Award is an award of the United States Agency for International Development. Similar versions of the same award exist for the former U.S. Information Agency, Arms Control and Disarmament Agency, and Department of State. It is presented to groups or individuals in recognition of a special act or service or sustained extraordinary performance covering a period of one year or longer.

The award consists of a certificate signed by an assistant secretary, an official of equivalent rank or the Mission Director. While some medal sets are still available, medals are no longer issued.

== Criteria ==
The following criteria are applicable to granting a Superior Honor Award:

- Contributions, which had a substantial impact on the accomplishment of the agency's missions, goals, or objectives;
- Accomplishments, which substantially contributed to the advancement of U.S. Government interests;
- Exceptional performance in one or more areas of the employee's official duties as defined in the Work Requirements Statement (Foreign Service) or Performance Plan (Civil Service);
- Innovation and creativity in accomplishing long-term tasks or projects;
- Contributions that resulted in increased productivity and efficiency, and economy of operations at agency level; and/or
- Exceptional devotion to duty under adverse conditions.

== Nominating and Approval Procedures ==
Nominations for USAID employees are submitted on Form JF-66, Nomination for Award, through supervisory channels to the Joint Country Awards Committee for review and recommendation to the Mission Director for final action.

Nominations initiated in Washington are reviewed by the USAID bureau/office with final approval by the appropriate assistant administrator or office head.

== Military Use ==
Upon authorization, members of the U.S. military may wear the medal and ribbon in the appropriate order of precedence as a U.S. non-military personal decoration.

== See also ==
- Department of State Superior Honor Award
- Awards of the United States Department of State
- Awards and decorations of the United States government
- United States Department of State
- U.S. Foreign Service
