= USIA Superior Honor Award =

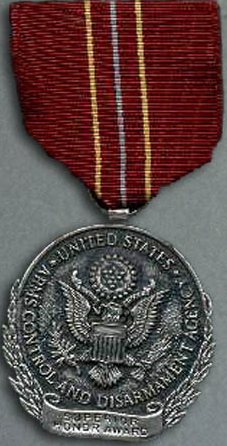
- ACDA Superior Honor Award medal, similar in appearance to the USIA Superior Honor Award medal
- Type: Medal
- Awarded for: " A special act or service or sustained extraordinary performance covering a period of one year or longer"
- Presented by: United States Information Agency
- Eligibility: Foreign Service, Civil Service, US Military
- Status: Obsolete
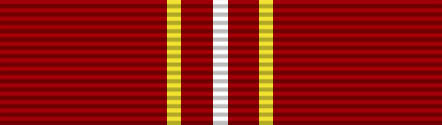
- Ribbon

Precedence
- Next (higher): USIA Distinguished Honor Award
- Next (lower): USIA Meritorious Honor Award

The Superior Honor Award is an award of the United States Information Agency, an independent agency charged with public diplomacy which has since been merged into the Department of State. Similar versions of the same award exist for the United States Agency for International Development, the Department of State, and the former Arms Control and Disarmament Agency. This award has been replaced with the State Department's Superior Honor Award. This award was presented to groups or individuals in recognition of a special act or service or sustained extraordinary performance covering a period of one year or longer.

The award consists of a certificate signed by an assistant secretary, an official of equivalent rank or the USIA Director.

== Criteria ==
The following criteria are applicable to granting a Superior Honor Award:

- Contributions, which had a substantial impact on the accomplishment of the agency’s missions, goals, or objectives;
- Accomplishments, which substantially contributed to the advancement of U.S. Government interests;
- Exceptional performance in one or more areas of the employee’s official duties as defined in the Work Requirements Statement (Foreign Service) or Performance Plan (Civil Service);
- Innovation and creativity in accomplishing long-term tasks or projects;
- Contributions that resulted in increased productivity and efficiency, and economy of operations at agency level; and/or
- Exceptional devotion to duty under adverse conditions.

== Military Use ==
Upon authorization, members of the U.S. military may wear the medal and ribbon in the appropriate order of precedence as a U.S. non-military personal decoration.

== See also ==
- Department of State Superior Honor Award
- Awards of the United States Department of State
- Awards and decorations of the United States government
- U.S. Information Agency
- U.S. Foreign Service
