= Secretary's Career Achievement Award =

Secretary’s Career Achievement Award
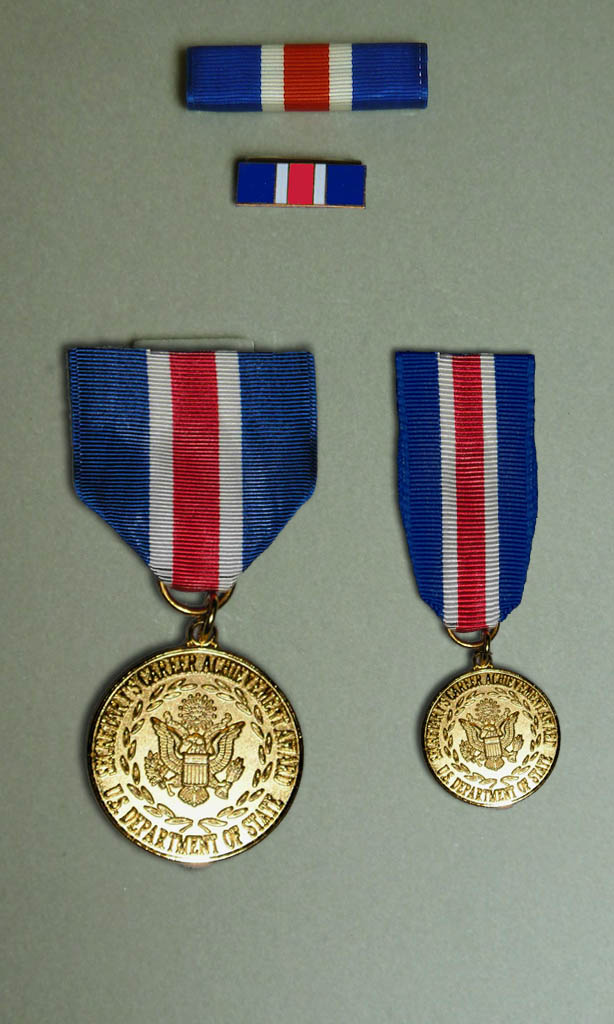
- Type: Military medal Service medal
- Awarded for: "Twenty five or more years of government service performed with dedication and determination"
- Presented by: United States Department of State
- Eligibility: Foreign Service, Civil Service
- Status: Currently awarded
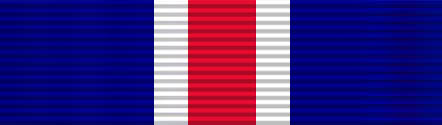
- Ribbon

Precedence
- Next (higher): Expeditionary Service Award
- Next (lower): John Jacob Rogers Award (obsolete)

The Secretary’s Career Achievement Award is an award of the United States Department of State. It is presented to retiring career employees in the Department who, over a period of 25 years or more, of U.S. Government and/or military service, have performed with dedication and distinction.

The award consists of a gold medal set and a certificate signed by the Secretary. While the Foreign Affairs Manual still stipulates award of a medal set, per a 2007 ALDAC (a cable intended for distribution to all diplomatic and consular posts), medals are no longer issued.

== Nominating and approval procedures ==
There is no nomination procedure. The Secretary’s Career Achievement Award is automatically awarded to all Department of State employees with 25 or more years of service performed with “dedication and distinction.”

== Military use ==
This award is not issued to active-duty military.

== Wilbur J. Carr Award ==
The Secretary’s Career Achievement Award was initially issued as the ‘Wilbur J. Carr Award’’, named after former Minister Wilbur J. Carr, who has been referred to as the "father of the Foreign Service." Minister Carr served as the head of the legation to the former Czechoslovakia in 1937 before the mission was closed. The medal was later changed to be the Secretary's Career Achievement Award, and although the medal itself changed, the ribbon retained the same color scheme.

== See also ==
- Awards of the United States Department of State
- Awards and decorations of the United States government
- United States Department of State
- U.S. Foreign Service
