= USIA Distinguished Honor Award =

Award of former United States Information Agency

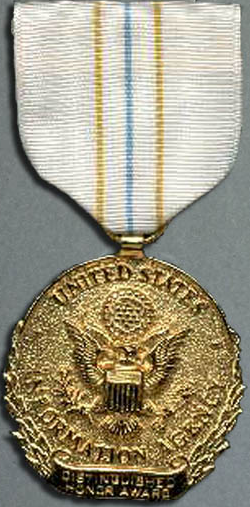
- USIA Distinguished Honor Award medal
- Type: Medal
- Awarded for: "Exceptionally outstanding service or achievements of marked national or international significance"
- Presented by: United States Information Agency
- Eligibility: Foreign Service, Civil Service, US Military
- Status: Obsolete
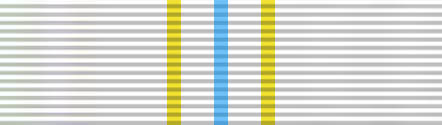
- Ribbon

Precedence
- Next (higher): Thomas Jefferson Star for Foreign Service
- Next (lower): USIA Superior Honor Award

The Distinguished Honor Award is an award of the United States Information Agency, an independent agency charged with public diplomacy which has since been merged into the Department of State. Similar versions of the same award exist for the United States Agency for International Development, the Department of State, and the former Arms Control and Disarmament Agency. This award has been replaced with the State Department's Distinguished Honor Award. This award was presented to groups or individuals in recognition of exceptionally outstanding service or achievements of marked national or international significance.

The award consists of a certificate signed by an assistant secretary, an official of equivalent rank or the USIA Director.

== Criteria ==
The following criteria are applicable to granting a Distinguished Honor Award:

- Exceptionally outstanding service to the agencies or the U.S. Government resulting in achievements of marked national or international significance;
- Exceptionally outstanding service and/or leadership in the administration of one or more agency programs that results in the highly successful accomplishment of mission, or in a major attainment of objectives or specific accomplishment to meet unique or emergency situations; and
- Outstanding accomplishments over a prolonged period that involve the exercise of authority or judgment in the public interest.

== Military Use ==
Upon authorization, members of the U.S. military may wear the medal and ribbon in the appropriate order of precedence as a U.S. non-military personal decoration.

== See also ==
- Department of State Distinguished Honor Award
- Awards of the United States Department of State
- Awards and decorations of the United States government
- U.S. Information Agency
- U.S. Foreign Service
