= USAID Meritorious Honor Award =

US government prize

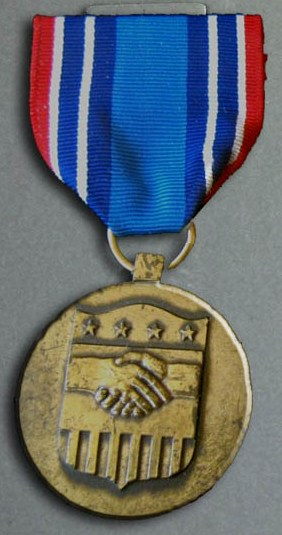
- Type: Military medal
- Awarded for: "A special act or service or sustained outstanding performance"
- Presented by: United States Agency for International Development
- Eligibility: Foreign Service, Civil Service, US Military
- Status: Currently awarded
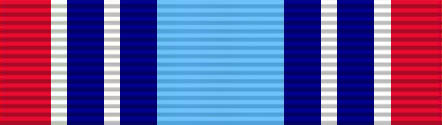
- Ribbon

Precedence
- Next (higher): USAID Superior Honor Award
- Next (lower): Expeditionary Service Award

The Meritorious Honor Award is an award of the United States Agency for International Development. Similar versions of the same award exist for the former U.S. Information Agency, Arms Control and Disarmament Agency, and Department of State. It is presented to groups or individuals in recognition of a special act or service or sustained outstanding performance.

The award consists of a certificate signed by an assistant secretary, an official of equivalent rank or the Mission Director. While some medal sets are still available, medals are no longer issued.

== Criteria ==
The following criteria are applicable to granting a USAID Meritorious Honor Award:

- Outstanding service in support of a one-time event (e.g., support for a major conference or summit meeting);
- Innovation and creativity in accomplishing short-term tasks or projects;
- Outstanding performance in one or more areas of the employee’s official duties as defined in the Work Requirements Statement (Foreign Service) or Performance Plan (Civil Service); and/or
- Contributions that resulted in increased productivity and efficiency, and economy of operations at post or bureau level.

== Nominating and Approval Procedures ==
Nominations for USAID employees are submitted on Form JF-66, Nomination for Award, through supervisory channels to the Joint Country Awards Committee for review and recommendation to the Mission Director for final action.

Nominations initiated in Washington are reviewed by the USAID bureau/office with final approval by the appropriate assistant administrator or office head.

== Military Use ==
Upon authorization, members of the U.S. military may wear the medal and ribbon in the appropriate order of precedence as a U.S. non-military personal decoration.

== See also ==
- Department of State Meritorious Honor Award
- Awards of the United States Department of State
- Awards and decorations of the United States government
- United States Agency for International Development
- U.S. Foreign Service
