= Merchant Marine Korean Service Medal =

Merchant Marine Korean Service Medal (Ribbon)
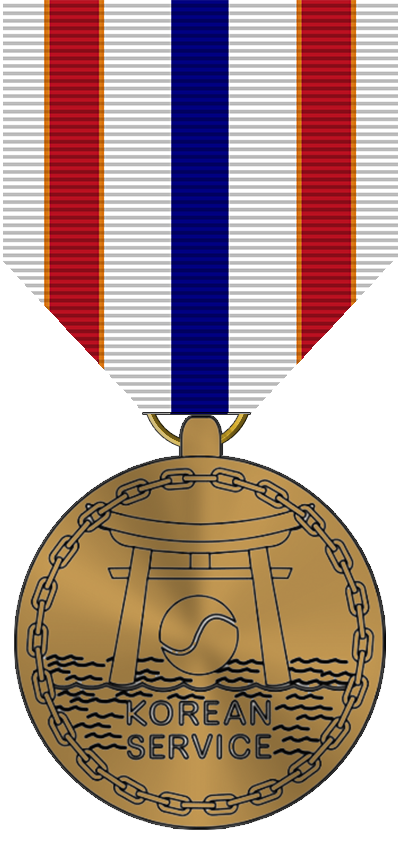
- Merchant Marine Korean Service Medal
- Type: Military medal Service medal
- Awarded for: Service during the Korean War
- Presented by: United States Maritime Administration
- Ribbon

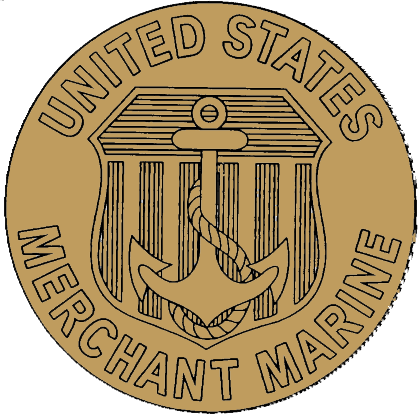
- Reverse
- Campaign: Korean War
- Status: inactive
- Established: July 24, 1956

Highlights
- Total: 2,000+

Precedence
- Next (higher): Merchant Marine World War II Victory Medal
- Equivalent: Korean Service Medal
- Next (lower): Merchant Marine Vietnam Service Medal

The Merchant Marine Korean Service Medal (Ribbon) is a decoration of the United States Merchant Marine awarded for service during the Korean War.

== History ==
The decoration was created by the United States Maritime Administration on July 24, 1956.

== Conditions ==
The decoration is awarded to officers and men for service aboard merchant vessels flying the American flag in waters adjacent to Korea between June 30, 1950, and September 30, 1953, during the Korean War.

Prior to 1992, the Merchant Marine Korean Service Medal was a ribbon-only decoration. Later, a medal was affixed to the ribbon. The following is a design note: "the torii gate and taeguk are traditionally associated with Korea. The ship's chain alludes to maritime service."

== See also ==
- Awards and decorations of the United States government
- Awards and Decorations of the United States Maritime Administration
- Awards and decorations of the United States Merchant Marine
- Awards and decorations of the United States military
