= Vietnam Service Medal =

American campaign medal

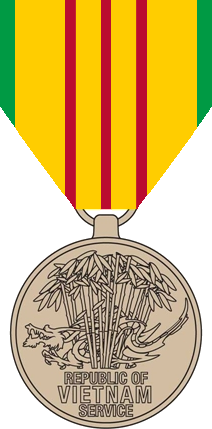
- Obverse
- Type: Military medal Service medal
- Awarded for: Service in geographical theater areas of Vietnam, Thailand, Laos, or Cambodia from 4 July 1965 through 28 March 1973 and the evacuation of Saigon (USN, USMC, and USAF) from 29–30 April 1975. The Armed Forces Expeditionary Medal was issued for initial operations in South Vietnam, Laos, and Cambodia from 1 July 1958 through 3 July 1965, and may be exchanged for the VSM.
- Presented by: the U.S. Department of Defense
- Eligibility: Members of the U.S. Armed Forces
- Reverse
- Campaign: Vietnam War
- Status: Obsolete
- Established: 8 July 1965 – Executive Order 11231; 28 November 1967 – Amended, E.O. 11382; 2 February 2003 – Amended, E.O. 13286
- First award: 4 July 1965; Retroactive to 1 July 1958
- Final award: 30 April 1975
- Service ribbon and campaign streamer

Precedence
- Next (higher): Armed Forces Expeditionary Medal
- Next (lower): Southwest Asia Service Medal
- Related: Republic of Vietnam Campaign Medal; Vietnam Civilian Service Award; Merchant Marine Vietnam Service Medal

The Vietnam Service Medal was a military award of the United States Armed Forces established on 8 July 1965 by order of President Lyndon B. Johnson. The medal is awarded to recognize service during the Vietnam War by all members of the U.S. Armed Forces provided they meet the award requirements.

The distinctive design has been attributed to both sculptor Thomas Hudson Jones, a former employee of the Army Institute of Heraldry and Mercedes Lee who created the design.

== Award criteria ==
The Vietnam Service Medal (VSM) was awarded to all members of the U.S. Armed Forces who served in Vietnam and its contiguous waters or airspace, after 3 July 1965 through 28 March 1973. Members of the U.S. Armed Forces in Thailand, Laos, Cambodia, or airspace thereover, during the same period and serving in direct support of operations in Vietnam are also eligible for the award.

Requirements

Individuals must meet one of the following requirements:

- Be attached to or regularly serve for 1 or more days with an organization participating in or directly supporting military operations.
- Be attached to or regularly serve for 1 or more days aboard a U.S. naval vessel directly supporting military operations.
- Actually participating as a crewmember in one or more aerial flights into airspace above Vietnam and contiguous waters directly supporting military operations.
- Serve on temporary duty for 30 consecutive days or 60 non-consecutive days in Vietnam or contiguous waters, except that time limit may be waived for personnel participating in actual combat operations.
- No person will be entitled to more than one award of the VSM.
- Individuals qualified for the Armed Forces Expeditionary Medal (AFEM) for reason of service in Vietnam between 1 July 1958 and 3 July 1965 (inclusive) will remain qualified for that medal. Upon request (unit personnel officer) any such individual may be awarded the VSM instead of the AFEM. In such instances, the AFEM will be deleted from the list of authorized medals in personnel records. No person will be entitled to both awards for Vietnam service.
- Service members who earned the AFEM for Operation Frequent Wind between 29 and 30 April 1975, may elect to receive the VSM instead of the AFEM. No service member may be issued both medals for service in Vietnam.
- Vietnam and contiguous waters, as used herein, is defined as an area which includes Vietnam and the water adjacent thereto with the following specified limits: from a point on the East Coast of Vietnam at the juncture of Vietnam with China southeastward to 21 degrees north latitude, 108 degrees, 15 minutes longitude; then southward to 18 degrees, north latitude, 108 degrees, 15 minutes east longitude; then southward to 17 degrees, 30 minutes north longitude, 111 degrees east longitude; then southward to 11 degrees north latitude, 111 degrees east latitude; then southward to 7 degrees north latitude, 105 degrees east latitude; then westward to 7 degrees north latitude, 103 degrees east latitude; then northward to 9 degrees, 30 minutes north latitude, 103 degrees east latitude; then northeastward to 10 degrees, 15 minutes north latitude, 104 degrees, 27 minutes east latitude; then northward to a point on the West Coast of Vietnam at the juncture of Vietnam and Cambodia.
- The VSM may be awarded posthumously.

The Vietnam Service Medal is retroactive to 1 July 1958 and supersedes and replaces the Armed Forces Expeditionary Medal which was issued for initial operations in South Vietnam, Laos, and Cambodia from that date through 3 July 1965. Defense Department regulations do not permit the simultaneous presentation of both the Vietnam Service Medal and the Armed Forces Expeditionary Medal, for the same period of service in Vietnam, however the AFEM may be exchanged for the VSM upon request from a service member. Veterans of the Vietnam War may exchange the AFEM for the VSM and have military records updated to reflect the difference by contacting the National Personnel Records Center, which is the current agency that provides record corrections reflecting an AFEM conversion to the Vietnam Service Medal.

Though the Mayaguez incident is often referred to as the last battle of the Vietnam War, U.S. military personnel who participated in it are not eligible for the Vietnam Service Medal by virtue of participating that battle alone, as the eligibility period for the medal ended in April 1975, a few weeks before the battle took place. Instead of the VSM, the AFEM is authorized for military members who participated in that battle. A congressional bill was introduced in 2016 to award veterans of the Mayaguez battle the VSM, but the bill was never voted out of committee, effectively ending it.

South Vietnam also issued its own service medal for the Vietnam War, known as the Republic of Vietnam Campaign Medal. This is a separate military award which was accepted by the U.S. Congress and the U.S. military in accordance with DoD 1348 C7. Six months of service in support of South Vietnamese military operations was the general U.S. requirement for the award.

== Appearance ==
Ribbon with silver star, denoting service in 5 campaigns

The Vietnam Service Medal is a rounded bronze shaped medal, 1 1/4 inches in diameter with a green, yellow, and red suspension ribbon. The obverse side of the medal consists of a figure of an oriental dragon (representing the subversive nature of the conflict) behind a grove of bamboo trees located above the inscription "REPUBLIC OF VIETNAM SERVICE". On the reverse, a crossbow (representing the ancient weapon of Vietnam) facing upwards with a ready to be fired lighted torch of the Statue of Liberty, above an arched inscription "UNITED STATES OF AMERICA".

The service ribbon of the medal is 1 3/8 inches wide and consists of the following vertical stripes: three narrow (1/16 inch) strips of red with wider (5/32 inch) stripes of yellow in the center, flanked by even wider (5/16 inch) stripes of yellow on each side and narrow 1/8-inch stripes of primitive green on the ends. The yellow (yellow is traditionally the imperial color of Vietnam) with red stripes (the red represents the three ancient Vietnamese empires of Tonkin, Annam, and Cochin China) resembles the former flag of South Vietnam. The green border on each side alludes to the jungle of that country.

Ribbon devices

The Vietnam Service Medal is authorized three devices for wear on the suspension and service ribbon of the medal:

- Arrowhead device: assigned or attached member of a U.S. Army or Air Force unit with direct combat assault credit for a parachute jump, helicopter assault landing, combat glider landing, or amphibious assault landing.
- FMF combat operation insignia: for Naval personnel assigned to a Marine Corps unit during Marine Corps combat operations.
- Service star (campaign star): for participation in or support of operations in the seventeen designated campaigns of the Vietnam War, a 3/16 inch bronze service star is authorized for wear on the Vietnam Service Medal suspension and service ribbon for each of the campaigns from 15 March 1962 to 28 January 1973; a 3/16 inch bronze star is also authorized for Operation Frequent Wind, 29–30 April 1975, for Navy, Marine Corps, and Air Force personnel. A 3/16 inch silver star is authorized in lieu of five bronze stars.

One 3/16 inch bronze service star is authorized for each campaign under the following conditions:

1. Assigned or attached to and present for duty with a unit during the period in which it participated in combat.
2. Under orders in a combat zone and in addition meets any of the following requirements:
a. Awarded a combat decoration.
b. Furnished a certificate by a Commanding General of a corps, higher unit, or independent force that soldier actually participated in combat.
c. Served at a normal post of duty (as contrasted to occupying the status of an inspector, observer, or visitor).
d. Aboard a vessel other than in a passenger status and furnished a certificate by the home port commander of the vessel that he or she served in the combat zone.
e. Was an evadee or escapee in the combat zone or recovered from a POW status in the combat zone during the time limitations of the campaign. POWs will not be accorded credit for the time spent in confinement or while otherwise in restraint under enemy control.

== Vietnam War campaigns ==
The U.S. Department of Defense established thirty military campaigns during the Vietnam War which covered all U.S. service branches. In 2010, the Department of Defense consolidated the original list of campaigns from the original thirty to a list of eighteen by combining the U.S. Air Force campaign list with the other armed services. The U.S. Army, and U.S. Coast Guard recognize seventeen 3/16" bronze service stars (also known as campaign stars; 3 silver stars and 2 bronze stars) on the Vietnam Service campaign streamer. Additionally, the Navy, Marine Corps, and Air Force recognize Operation Frequent Wind (29–30 April 1975).

=== U.S. Department of Defense consolidated campaign periods ===
DoD consolidated campaign periods for all services

Name of campaign	Start date	End date
Vietnam Advisory Campaign (Note: Campaign period authorized by Department of Defense Manual 1348.33 Volume 2, dated 23 November 2010)	15 March 1962	7 March 1965
Vietnam Defense Campaign	8 March 1965	24 December 1965
Vietnam Counteroffensive.	25 December 1965	30 June 1966
Vietnam Counteroffensive Phase II	1 July 1966	31 May 1967
Vietnam Counteroffensive Phase III	1 June 1967	29 January 1968
Tet Counteroffensive	30 January 1968	1 April 1968
Vietnam Counteroffensive Phase IV	2 April 1968	30 June 1968
Vietnam Counteroffensive Phase V	1 July 1968	1 November 1968
Vietnam Counteroffensive Phase VI	2 November 1968	22 February 1969
Tet 69 Counteroffensive (Note: Campaign period originally authorized by the Department of the Air Force but now consolidated with the Department of Defense list)	23 February 1969	8 June 1969
Vietnam Summer–Fall 1969	9 June 1969	31 October 1969
Vietnam Winter–Spring 1970	1 November 1969	30 April 1970
Sanctuary Counteroffensive	1 May 1970	30 June 1970
Vietnam Counteroffensive Phase VII	1 July 1970	30 June 1971
Consolidation I	1 July 1971	30 November 1971
Consolidation II	1 December 1971	29 March 1972
Vietnam Cease-fire	30 March 1972	28 January 1973
Operation Frequent Wind (USN, USMC, and USAF only)	29 April 1975	30 April 1975

=== U.S. Air Force original campaign periods ===
Original USAF campaign periods before DoD consolidation

Name of campaign	Start date	End date
Vietnam Initial Advisory Campaign	15 November 1961	1 March 1965
Vietnam Air Defensive Campaign	2 March 1965	30 January 1966
Vietnam Air Counteroffensive	31 January 1966	28 June 1966
Vietnam Air Offensive	29 June 1966	8 March 1967
Vietnam Air Offensive Phase II	9 March 1967	31 March 1967
Vietnam Air/Ground Campaign	22 January 1968	7 July 1968
Vietnam Air Offensive Phase III	1 Apr 1968	31 October 1968
Vietnam Air Offensive Phase IV	1 November 1968	22 February 1969
Tet 69 Counteroffensive	23 February 1969	8 June 1969
Vietnam Summer–Fall 1969	9 June 1969	31 October 1969
Vietnam Winter–Spring 1970	1 November 1969	30 April 1970
Sanctuary Counteroffensive	1 May 1970	30 June 1970
Southwest Monsoon	1 July 1970	30 November 1970
Commando Hunt V	1 December 1970	14 May 1971
Commando Hunt VI	15 May 1971	31 October 1971
Commando Hunt VII	1 November 1971	29 March 1972
Vietnam Cease-fire	30 March 1972	28 January 1973
Operation Frequent Wind	29 April 1975	30 April 1975

== See also ==
- Vietnam Campaign Medal
- Gallantry Cross (Vietnam)
