= Meritorious Honor Award =

Award of the United States Department of State

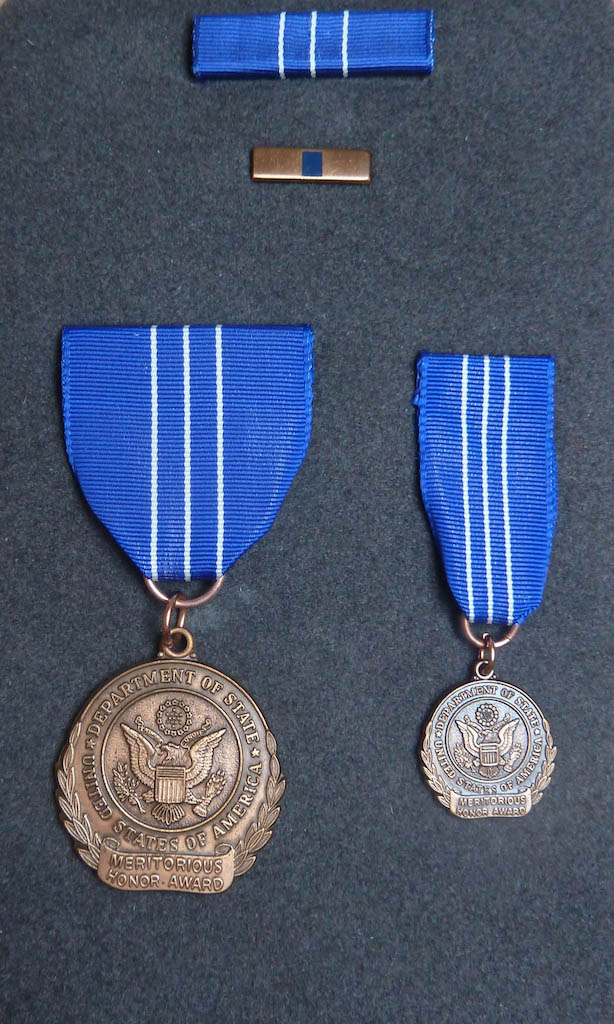
- Type: Military medal
- Awarded for: "A special act or service or sustained outstanding performance"
- Presented by: United States Department of State
- Eligibility: Foreign Service, Civil Service
- Status: Currently awarded
- Ribbon

Precedence
- Next (higher): Superior Honor Award
- Next (lower): Expeditionary Service Award

The Meritorious Honor Award is an award of the United States Department of State. Similar versions of the same award exist for the former U.S. Information Agency, Arms Control and Disarmament Agency, and USAID. It is presented to groups or individuals in recognition of a special act or service or sustained outstanding performance.

The award consists of a certificate signed by an assistant secretary, an official of equivalent rank or the Chief of Mission. The FAM was updated to remove the issue of the medal set.

== Criteria ==
The following criteria are applicable to granting a Meritorious Honor Award:

- Outstanding service in support of a one-time event (e.g., support for a major conference or summit meeting);
- Innovation and creativity in accomplishing short-term tasks or projects;
- Outstanding performance in one or more areas of the employee’s official duties as defined in the Work Requirements Statement (Foreign Service) or Performance Plan (Civil Service); and/or
- Contributions that resulted in increased productivity and efficiency, and economy of operations at post or bureau level.

== Nominating and Approval Procedures ==
Nominations for State and USAID employees are submitted on Form JF-66, Nomination for Award, through supervisory channels to the Joint Country Awards Committee for review and recommendation to the Chief of Mission for final action.

Nominations initiated in Washington are submitted to the appropriate area awards committee for final action. For USAID, nominations initiated in Washington are reviewed by the USAID bureau/office with final approval by the appropriate assistant administrator or office head.

== Military use ==
Upon authorization, members of the U.S. military, may wear the medal and ribbon in the appropriate order of precedence as a U.S. non-military personal decoration.

The Marine Corps is not permitted to wear the MHA.

== See also ==
- USAID Meritorious Honor Award
- Awards of the United States Department of State
- Awards and decorations of the United States government
- United States Department of State
- U.S. Foreign Service
