= John Jacob Rogers Award =

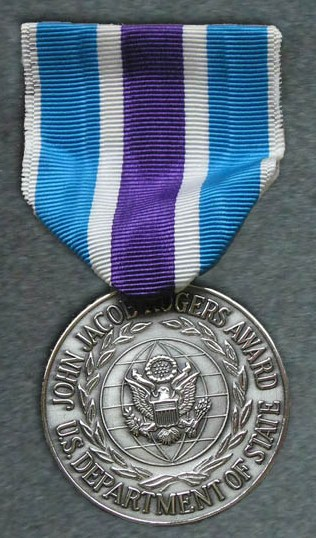
- Type: Military medal Service medal
- Awarded for: "Twenty five or more years of government service performed with dedication and determination"
- Presented by: United States Department of State
- Eligibility: Foreign service, civil service
- Status: Obsolete, replaced with the Secretary’s Career Achievement Award
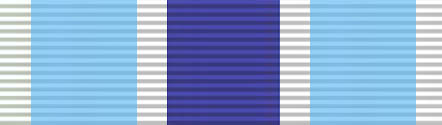
- Ribbon

Precedence
- Next (higher): Secretary’s Career Achievement Award

The John Jacob Rogers Award is an obsolete award of the United States Department of State. It has since been replaced with the Secretary’s Career Achievement Award. It was presented to retiring career employees in the Department who, over a period of 25 years or more, of U.S. government or military service, performed with dedication and distinction.

The award consisted of a silver medal set and a certificate signed by the secretary. It was named for Congressman John Jacob Rogers, for whom the Rogers Act of 1924 is named. The Rogers Act consolidated the diplomatic and consular officers into one diplomatic corps, which is now the US Foreign Service.

The original medal was sterling silver with the text "John Jacob Rogers Award" inscribed across the top, "U.S. Department of State" across the bottom, and the Great Seal of the United States superimposed over a globe surrounded by laurel wreath.

== Nomination and approval procedures ==
There is no nomination procedure. The John Jacob Rogers Award was automatically awarded to all Department of State employees with 25 or more years of service performed with “dedication and distinction.”

== Military use ==
This award is not issued to active-duty military.

== See also ==
- Awards of the United States Department of State
- Awards and decorations of the United States government
- United States Department of State
- U.S. Foreign Service
