= Merchant Marine Vietnam Service Medal =

Merchant Marine Vietnam Service Medal (Ribbon)
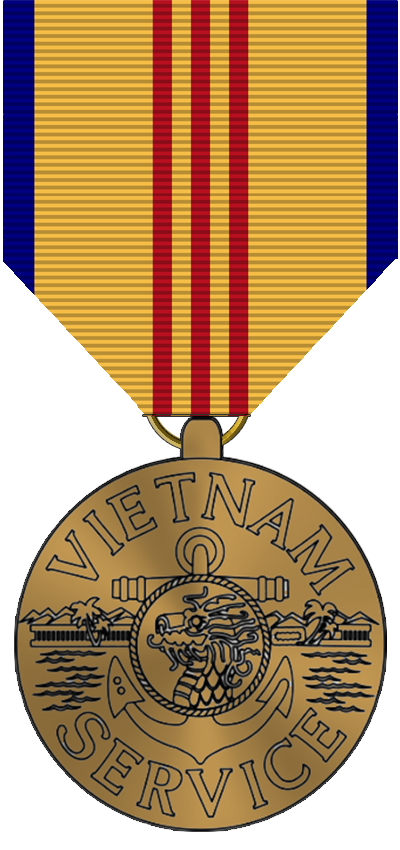
- Merchant Marine Vietnam Service Medal
- Type: Military medal Service medal
- Awarded for: Service in waters adjacent to Vietnam.
- Presented by: United States Maritime Administration
- Ribbon

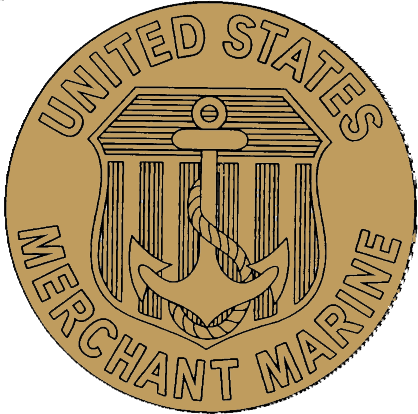
- Reverse
- Campaign: Vietnam War
- Status: inactive
- Established: May 20, 1968

Highlights
- Total: 5,000+

Precedence
- Next (higher): Merchant Marine Korean Service Medal
- Equivalent: Vietnam Service Medal; Vietnam Civilian Service Award
- Next (lower): Merchant Marine Expeditionary Medal

The Merchant Marine Vietnam Service Medal (Ribbon) is a decoration of the United States Merchant Marine authorized on May 20, 1968.

== Conditions ==
The decoration is awarded to officers and men for service aboard merchant vessels flying the American flag in Vietnam waters between July 4, 1965 and August 15, 1973.

== Design ==
Prior to 1992, the Merchant Marine Vietnam Service Medal was a ribbon-only decoration. Afterwards, a medal was affixed to the ribbon. As follows is a design note: "the dragon is traditionally associated with Vietnam, the shoreline denotes service in the coastal waters adjacent to Vietnam, and the anchor symbolizes maritime service."

== See also ==
- Awards and decorations of the United States government
- Awards and Decorations of the United States Maritime Administration
- Awards and decorations of the United States Merchant Marine
- Awards and decorations of the United States military
