= Merchant Marine World War II Victory Medal =

U.S. merchant marine medal

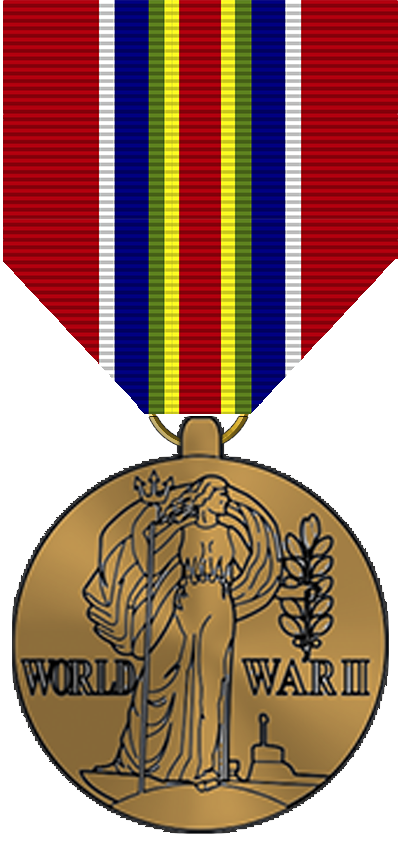
- The obverse side of the medal.
- Type: Military medal
- Awarded for: Service during World War II
- Presented by: United States Maritime Administration
- Eligibility: Merchant mariners
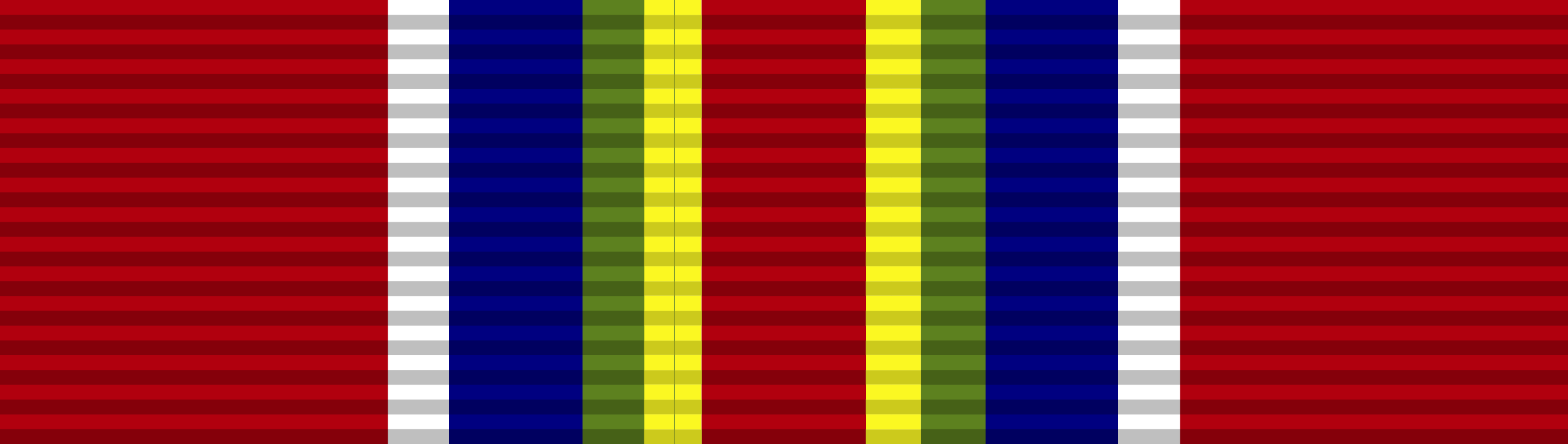
- Ribbon

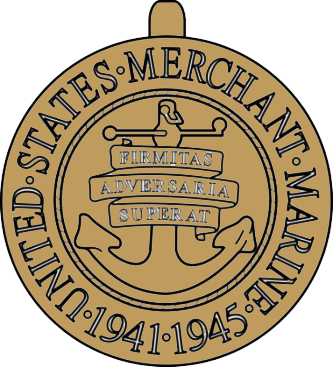
- Reverse
- Campaign: World War II (1941-1945)
- Established: August 8, 1946

Precedence
- Next (higher): Merchant Marine Pacific War Zone Medal
- Equivalent: World War II Victory Medal
- Next (lower): Merchant Marine Korean Service Medal

The Merchant Marine World War II Victory Medal is a decoration of the United States Merchant Marine established by an Act of Congress on August 8, 1946.

== Conditions ==
The decoration is awarded to officers and men of the U.S. Merchant Marine who served aboard American-flagged merchant ships for at least 30 days between December 7, 1941, and September 2, 1945.

== Design ==
The medal is a bronze disc suspended from a ribbon with wide red edges and a red center flanked by narrow stripes of yellow, green, blue, and white. The front of the medal shows a woman standing on the ocean's surface holding a trident in her right hand and an olive branch in her left hand. To the left of the woman is the word "WORLD" and to the right of her is "WAR II". The reverse side shows an anchor inside a rope circle, around which is wound a ribbon marked "FIRMITAS", "ADVERSARIA", and "SUPERAT" (Latin for "The strength to overcome an adversary"). In a circle around the edge of the reverse side are the words "UNITED STATES MERCHANT MARINE 1941-1945".

John R. Sinnock designed the medal.

== See also ==
- Awards and decorations of the United States government
- Awards and Decorations of the United States Maritime Administration
- Awards and decorations of the United States Merchant Marine
- Awards and decorations of the United States military
- World War II Victory Medal (United States)
