= World War II Victory Medal =

American service medal

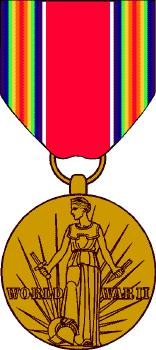
- Obverse
- Type: Military medal Service medal
- Presented by: Department of War and Department of the Navy
- Eligibility: Served in the armed forces between 7 December 1941 and 31 December 1946.
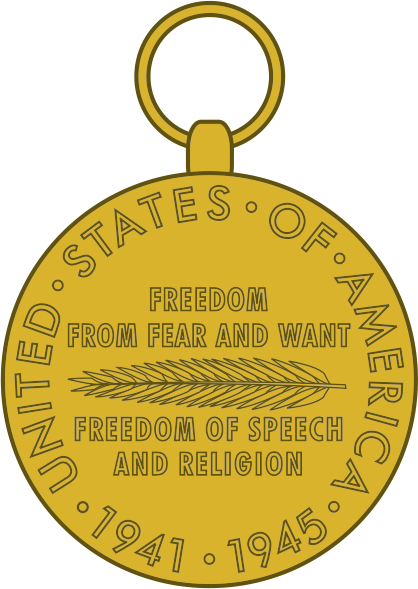
- Reverse
- Status: Obsolete
- Service ribbon (top) and campaign streamer (bottom)

Precedence
- Next (higher): European-African-Middle Eastern Campaign Medal
- Equivalent: Merchant Marine World War II Victory Medal
- Next (lower): Army of Occupation Medal or Navy Occupation Service Medal

The World War II Victory Medal was a service medal of the United States military which was established by an Act of Congress on 6 July 1945 (Public Law 135, 79th Congress) and promulgated by Section V, War Department Bulletin 12, 1945.

== History ==
The World War II Victory Medal was established by an Act of Congress on 6 July 1945 (Public Law 135, 79th Congress) and promulgated by Section V, War Department Bulletin 12, 1945. The bronze medal was designed by Thomas H. Jones and approved by the Secretary of War on 5 February 1946. Consequently, it did not transition from a ribbon to a full medal until after World War II had ended. The World War II Victory Medal was first issued as a service ribbon, referred to as the "Victory Ribbon."

The Congressional authorization for the medal specified that it was to be awarded to any member of the United States military, including members of the armed forces of the Government of the Philippine Islands, who served on active duty, or as a reservist, between 7 December 1941 and the ending of hostilities as declared by the president.

On 8 August 1946, the separate Merchant Marine World War II Victory Medal was established for members of the United States Merchant Marine who served during World War II.

== Criteria ==
The World War II Victory Medal was awarded for service between 7 December 1941 and 31 December 1946, both dates inclusive, with no minimum time in service requirement. The National Personnel Records Center has reported some cases of service members receiving the award for only a few days of service. As hostilities during the Second World War ended on 2 September 1945, there may be cases of service members who had enlisted, entered officer candidate school, or had been a cadet or midshipman at the U.S. Military Academy, the U.S. Naval Academy or the U.S. Coast Guard Academy between 3 September 1945 and any date in 1946, receiving the medal without having been a veteran of the period of active hostilities during the war; the reason for this late date is that President Harry S. Truman did not declare an official end to hostilities until the last day of 1946.

As every member of the United States Armed Forces who served from 7 December 1941 to 31 December 1946 was eligible for the medal, there were over twelve million eligible recipients, making the World War II Victory Medal the second most widely awarded military award of the United States, after the National Defense Service Medal.

== Appearance ==
The bronze medal is 1 1/2 inches in width. The obverse is a figure of Liberation standing full length with head turned to dexter looking to the dawn of a new day, right foot resting on a war god's helmet with the hilt of a broken sword in the right hand and the broken blade in the left hand, the inscription WORLD WAR II placed immediately below the center. On the reverse are inscriptions for the Four Freedoms: FREEDOM FROM FEAR AND WANT and FREEDOM OF SPEECH AND RELIGION separated by a palm branch, all within a circle composed of the words UNITED STATES OF AMERICA 1941 1945.

The suspension and service ribbon of the medal is 1 3/8 inches wide and consists of the following stripes: 3/8 inch double rainbow in juxtaposition (blues, greens, yellows, reds (center), yellows greens and blues); 1/32 inch White 67101; center 9/16 inch Old Glory Red 67156; 1/32 inch White; and 3/8 inch double rainbow in juxtaposition. The rainbow on each side of the ribbon is a miniature of the pattern used in the World War I Victory Medal.

Although the World War I Victory Medal included clasps, the World War II Victory Medal did not, as individual campaign medals were awarded instead (e.g. the European–African–Middle Eastern Campaign Medal).

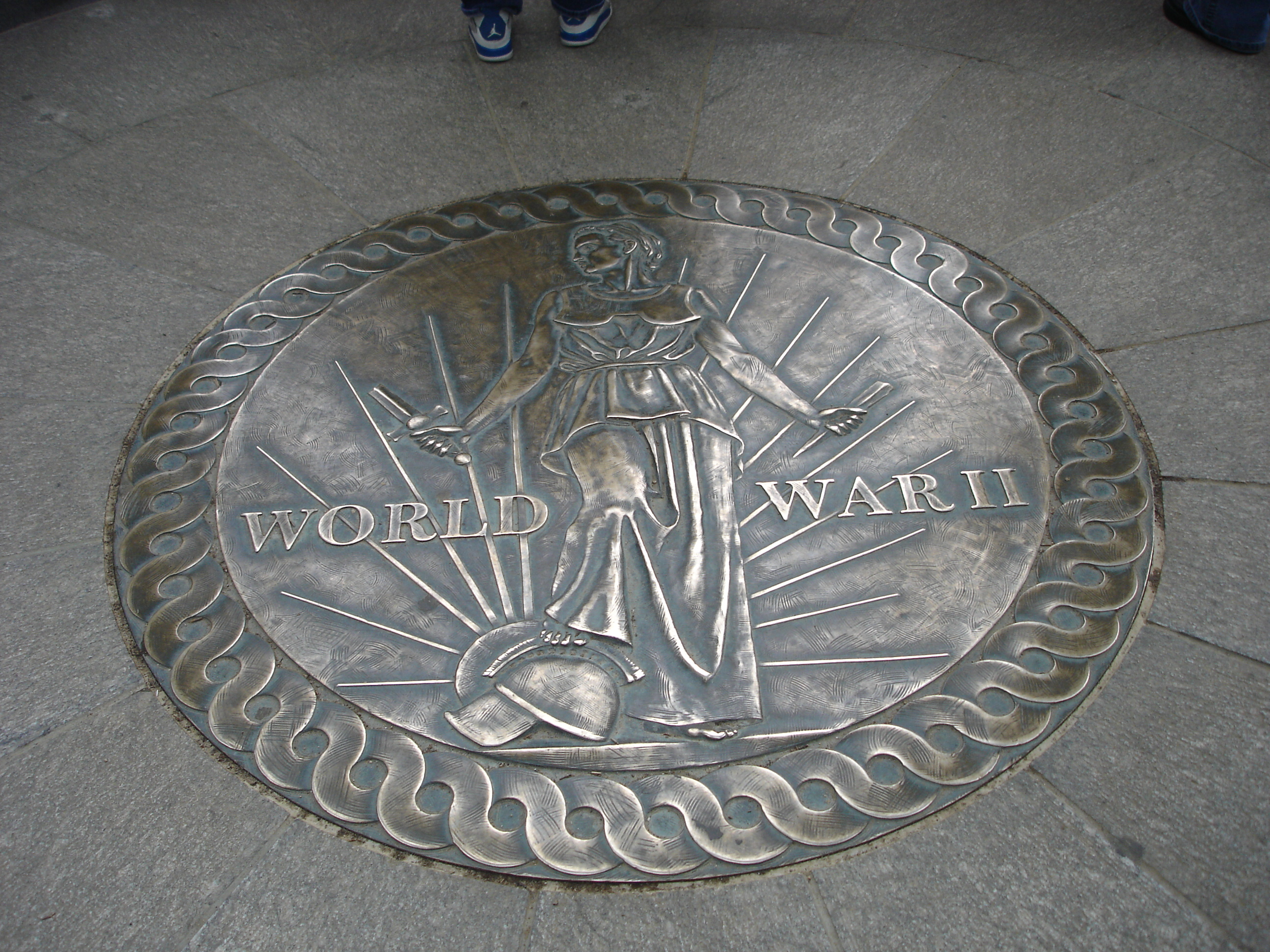
The National World War II Memorial has an engraving of it in one of the two pavilions

== See also ==
- Awards and decorations of the United States military
- Merchant Marine World War II Victory Medal
