= Expeditionary Service Award =

United States Department of State award

- Type: Service award
- Awarded for: "Expeditionary service in designated field locations"
- Presented by: United States Department of State
- Eligibility: Foreign Service, Civil Service
- Status: Currently awarded
- First award: 2011

Precedence
- Next (higher): USAID Meritorious Honor Award
- Next (lower): Secretary's Career Achievement Award

The Expeditionary Service Award is an award of the United States Department of State. It is presented to employees in the Department who serve in designated field locations. Currently, the following locations have been designated expeditionary by the Director General of the Foreign Service:

- Iraq
- Afghanistan

The award consists of a certificate signed by the Secretary and a lapel pin. There is no cash award associated with recognition.

== Nomination and approval ==
The Assistant Secretary of a regional bureau may seek approval to present the Expeditionary Service Award to State Department employees who meet the award's criteria of a year’s assignment with successful service, to arduous and difficult field locations. The regional bureau will identify eligible field locations where State Department employees work and live in exceptionally difficult circumstances. The bureau also sees that a suitable citation is drafted for the Secretary’s approval. The awards committee or approving official will vet the recipients through the Office of the Inspector General, Office of Investigations, before the award is approved.

As a civilian award, it is not issued to active-duty military personnel.

== See also ==
- Awards of the United States Department of State
- Awards and decorations of the United States government
- United States Foreign Service
