= John F. McCarthy Jr. =

Engineer

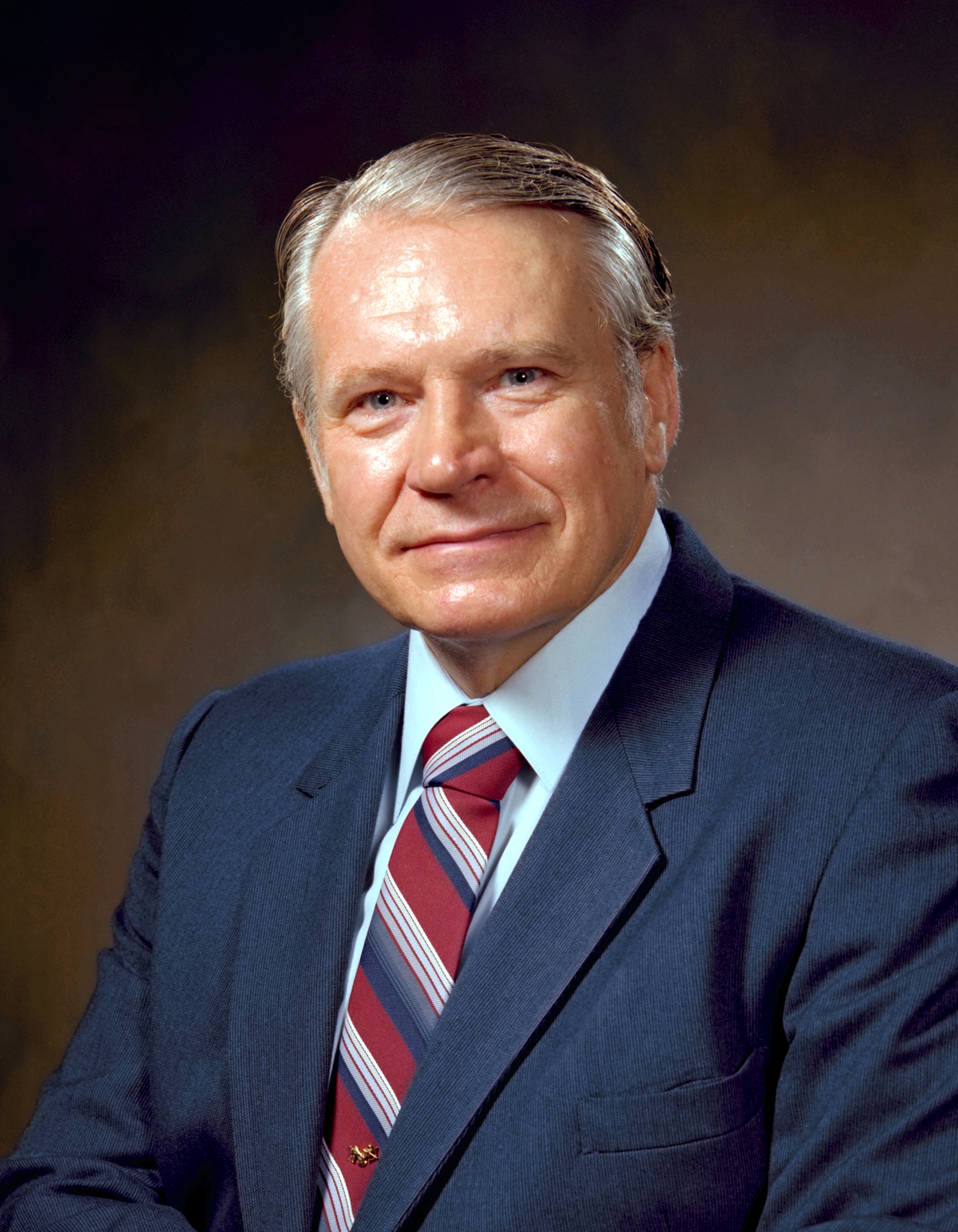
- Born: August 28, 1925; Boston, Massachusetts, US
- Died: February 7, 1986 (aged 60); Boston, Massachusetts, US
- Resting place: Fairhaven Memorial Park, Santa Ana, California
- Education: Massachusetts Institute of Technology (BS 1950, MS 1951); California Institute of Technology (PhD 1962)
- Occupations: Engineer and Scientist
- Employers: Massachusetts Institute of Technology; National Aeronautics and Space Administration; Northrop Corporation
- Spouse: Camille
- Children: 5
- Awards: Apollo Achievement Award; Air Force Meritorious Civilian Service Award; Department of the Air Force Decoration for Exceptional Civilian Service; NASA Distinguished Service Medal

John Francis McCarthy Jr. (August 8, 1925 – February 7, 1986) was an American scientist and engineer. He worked for the Massachusetts Institute of Technology as director of its Center for Space Research; the National Aeronautics and Space Administration (NASA) as the director of its Lewis Research Center; the United States Air Force, where he served with the Strategic Air Command and as a member of the United States Air Force Scientific Advisory Board; North American Rockwell, where he oversaw the design and development of the Apollo command and service module that took the first men to the Moon, and the S-II of the Saturn V rocket. His work doubled, and in the case of the Lockheed C-5 Galaxy, tripled, the service life of aircraft.

== Early life ==
John Francis McCarthy Jr. was born on August 8, 1925. He had a sister and four brothers. He served in the military during World War II from 1944 to 1946, and worked for Trans World Airlines in Rome, Italy. He entered the Massachusetts Institute of Technology (MIT), where he earned a Bachelor of Science in aeronautical engineering in 1950 and a Master of Science degree in aeronautical engineering in 1951.

== Aircraft and spacecraft ==
McCarthy worked as a project manager in the Aeroelastic and Structures Research Laboratory at MIT from 1951 to 1955, where he investigated the phenomenon of supersonic flutter, and developed the first tests for it. From 1955 to 1961, he was an operations analyst with the United States Air Force (USAF) Strategic Air Command. He then became vice-president of research and engineering in the Space Division of North American Rockwell. He received a Ph.D. from the California Institute of Technology in 1962, writing his thesis on the subject of "Hypersonic Wakes". At North American he oversaw the design and testing of the Apollo command and service module that took the first men to the Moon, and the S-II of the Saturn V rocket that launched it. For his services, he received the Apollo Achievement Award from NASA in 1969, and the Air Force Meritorious Civilian Service Award from the USAF in 1973.

In 1971 McCarthy returned to MIT as a professor in the Department of Aeronautics and Astronautics. In 1974 he became director of MIT's Center for Space Research. He became the director of the National Aeronautics and Space Administration (NASA) Lewis Research Center in Cleveland, Ohio, in 1978. He concurrently served as a member of the United States Air Force Scientific Advisory Board and as chairman of its Aeronautical Systems Division Advisory Group. He headed a review of the Lockheed C-5 Galaxy that investigated problems with its wing design. Modifications suggested by his group tripled the structural life of the aircraft. He subsequently headed study groups that identified ways and means of increasing the structural life of the Boeing B-52 Stratofortress, McDonnell Douglas F-4 Phantom II, Fairchild Republic A-10 Thunderbolt II, and Boeing KC-135 Stratotanker. The structural life of these aircraft was increased by 1.05 to 2.0 times. He was awarded the Department of the Air Force Decoration for Exceptional Civilian Service in 1978, and the NASA Distinguished Service Medal in 1982.

McCarthy returned to private industry in 1982 as the vice president and general manager of the Electro-Mechanical Division of Northrop Corporation in Anaheim, California. While on a business trip to Boston on February 7, 1986, McCarthy suddenly died from a blood clot in his lungs. His remains were returned to California, where he was interred in Fairhaven Memorial Park in Santa Ana, California.
