= Air and Space Campaign Medal =

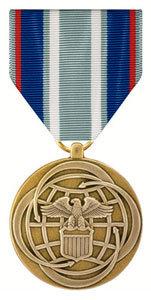
- Obverse
- Type: Military medal Service medal
- Awarded for: Participating in or directly supporting a significant U.S. military operation designated by the Air Force chief of staff.
- Presented by: the Department of the Air Force
- Eligibility: U.S. Air Force and U.S. Space Force personnel
- Status: Currently awarded
- Established: 24 April 2002
- Air and Space Campaign Medal ribbon

Precedence
- Next (higher): Remote Combat Effects Campaign Medal
- Next (lower): Nuclear Deterrence Operations Service Medal

The Air and Space Campaign Medal (ASCM) is an award of the United States Air Force and United States Space Force which was first created on April 24, 2002 by order of Secretary of the Air Force James G. Roche. The ASCM may be awarded to members of the USAF and USSF who, after March 24, 1999, supported a significant U.S. military operation designated by the Chief of Staff of the United States Air Force as qualifying for the ASCM at home station or from outside the geographic area of combat. The Remote Combat Effects Campaign Medal (RCECM) is a similar medal established on 22 May 2019 for Air Force personnel who directly participated in a U.S. Department of Defense (DoD) combat operation from a remote location.

== Eligibility ==
To be eligible for the Air and Space Campaign Medal a service member must provide support of a military operation for at least thirty consecutive days or for sixty non-consecutive days. "Direct support" is defined as deploying in support of an ASCM approved operation outside the geographic area of combat which historically were deployed forward. This includes, but is not limited to, sortie generation, intelligence, surveillance, targeting, etc. Squadron Commanders may determine other functions that meet the intent of this award.

Members who provided direct support for 30 consecutive or 60 nonconsecutive days to one of these operations outside of the geographic area of combat qualify for the ASCM.

The Air and Space Campaign Medal is only authorized for Air Force personnel and is prohibited for issuance if another campaign or service medal has already been received for the operation in question. Additional awards are denoted by service stars.

== Qualifying Operations ==
- Operation Allied Force 24 March 1999 – 10 June 1999
- Operation Allied Harbour 4 April 1999 – 1 September 1999
- Operation Sustain Hope/Shining Hope 4 April 1999 – 10 July 1999
- Operation Noble Anvil 24 March 1999 – 20 July 1999
- Kosovo Task Force Hawk 5 April 1999 – 24 June 1999
- Kosovo Task Force Saber 31 March 1999 – 8 July 1999
- Operation Joint Guardian 11 June 1999 – 31 December 2013
- Kosovo Task Force Falcon 11 June 1999 – 31 December 2013
- Kosovo Task Force Hunter 1 April 1999 – 1 November 1999
- Operation Odyssey Dawn 26 February 2011 – 31 October 2011
- Operation Unified Protector 26 February 2011 – 31 October 2011

Operations related to the Global War on Terrorism (to include Operation Iraqi Freedom and Operation Enduring Freedom) are not eligible for the ASCM.
