= Ed Dwight =

American Air Force test pilot, astronaut, and sculptor (born 1933)

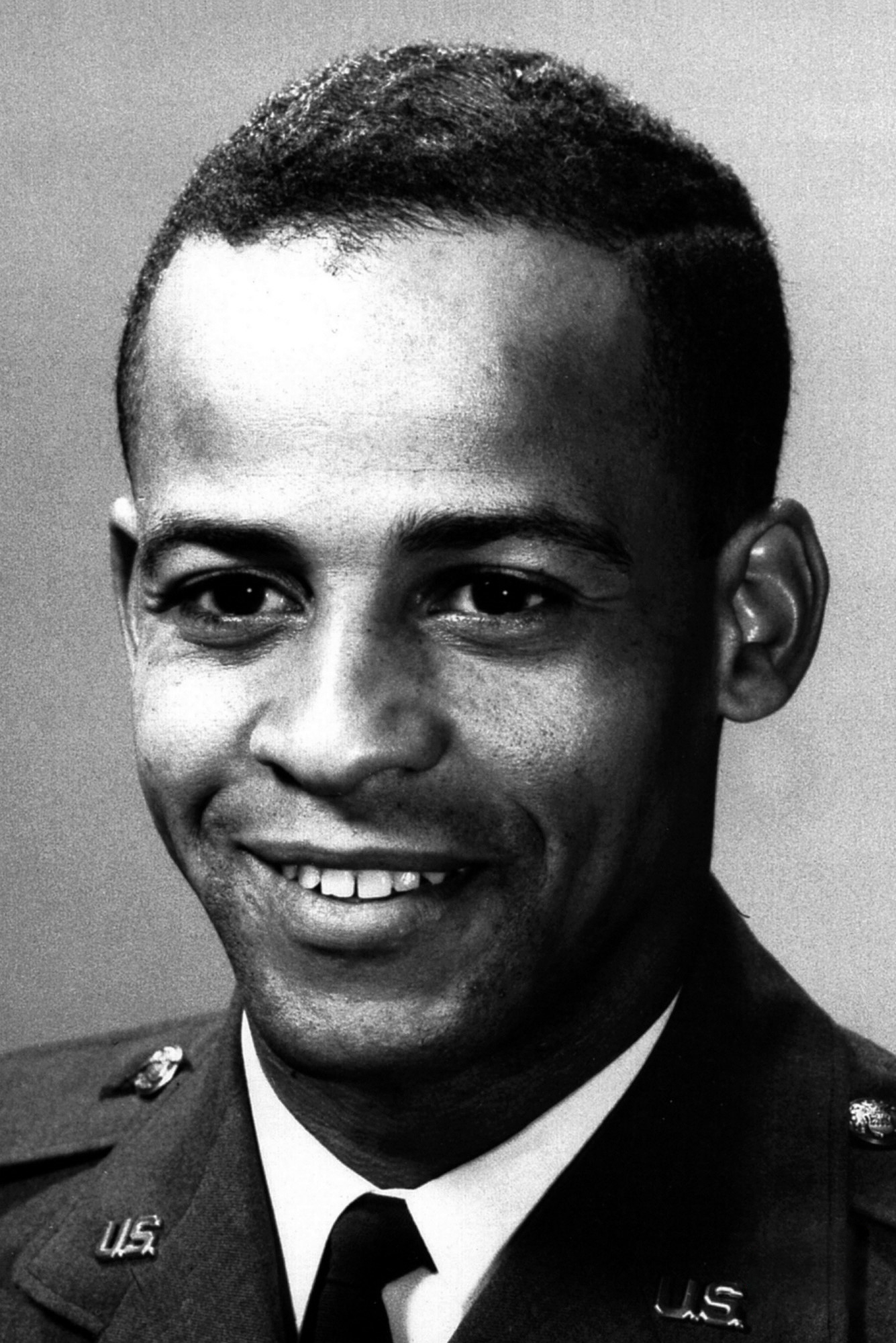
- Dwight in Air Force uniform
- Born: Edward Joseph Dwight Jr. September 9, 1933 (age 92); Kansas City, Kansas, U.S.
- Education: Kansas City Junior College (AA); Arizona State University, Tempe (BS); University of Denver (MFA)
- Known for: First African-American to enter the U.S. Air Force program from which astronauts were selected; Oldest person to ever fly in space; Sculpting several public monuments
- Military career
- Allegiance: United States
- Branch: United States Air Force
- Service years: 1953–1966
- Rank: Captain
- Awards: Air Force Commander's Award for Public Service
- Space career

Spaceflight participant
- Flight time: 9m 53s
- Selection: Space for Humanity (2024)
- Missions: Blue Origin NS-25
- Mission insignia
- Website: eddwight.com

Edward Joseph Dwight Jr. (born September 9, 1933) is an American sculptor, author, retired test pilot, and astronaut. Dwight enlisted in the U.S. Air Force in 1953 and was commissioned a lieutenant in 1955. In 1961, at the direction of President John F. Kennedy, he became the first African American to enter the Air Force training program from which NASA selected astronauts. Although he completed training at the Aerospace Research Pilot School in 1963 and advanced to the second round of the program, in the end he was not selected for the Astronaut Corps.

Dwight finally traveled into space on the Blue Origin NS-25 mission in 2024, becoming the oldest person to ever participate in a spaceflight, a record previously held by William Shatner. In 2020, he became an honorary member of the U.S. Space Force during a ceremony at the Pentagon.

An accomplished sculptor, Dwight has completed a number of public monuments, including the Texas African American History Memorial on the grounds of the Texas State Capitol, and the African American History Monument on the grounds of the South Carolina State House.

== Biography ==
=== Early life ===
Dwight was born on September 9, 1933, in the racially segregated Kansas City, Kansas area, to Georgia Baker Dwight (1910–2006) and Edward Joseph Dwight Sr. (1905–1975), who played second base and centerfield for the Kansas City Monarchs and other Negro league teams from 1924 to 1937.

At age four, Dwight built a toy airplane out of orange crates in his backyard. As a child, he was an avid reader and talented artist who was mechanically gifted and enjoyed working with his hands. He attended grade school at Our Lady of Perpetual Help in Kansas City. While delivering newspapers, he saw Air Force pilot Dayton Ragland, a Black man from Kansas City, on the front page of The Call. Having grown up in racist segregation, he instantly "wigged out", becoming inspired to follow this career path while thinking "This is insane. I didn't even know they let black pilots get anywhere near airplanes. ... Where did he get trained? How did he get in the military? How did all this stuff happen right before my nose?" In 1951, he became the first African-American male to graduate from Bishop Ward High School, a private Catholic high school in Kansas City, Kansas. He was a member of the National Honor Society and earned a scholarship to attend the Kansas City Art Institute. Dwight enrolled at Kansas City Junior College and graduated with an Associate of Arts degree in engineering in 1953.

=== Career ===
==== Piloting ====
Dwight enlisted in the United States Air Force in 1953. He completed his airman and cadet pre-flight training at Lackland Air Force Base near San Antonio, Texas. He then traveled to Malden Air Base in Malden, Missouri, to finish his primary flight training. He earned a commission as an Air Force second lieutenant in 1955 before being assigned to Williams Air Force Base, southeast of Phoenix, Arizona.

While training to become a test pilot, Dwight attended night classes at Arizona State University. In 1957, he graduated cum laude with a Bachelor of Science degree in aeronautical engineering. Dwight later completed Air Force courses in experimental test piloting and aerospace research at Edwards Air Force Base in 1961 and 1962, respectively. He earned the rank of captain while serving in the Air Force.

==== Pre-astronaut training ====
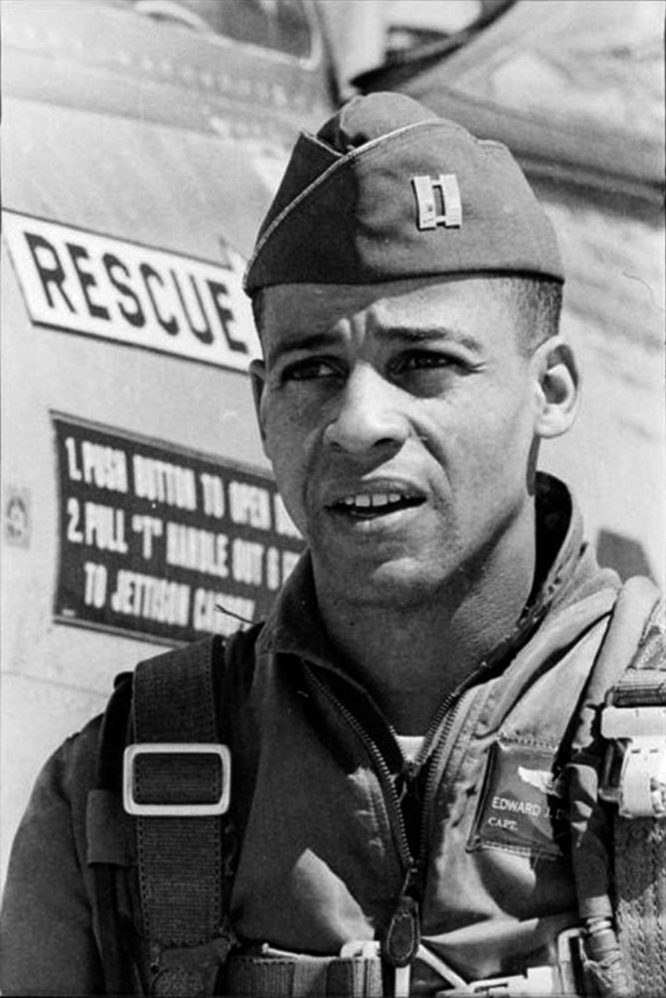
Dwight in his Air Force uniform, with captain's insignia.

In 1961, Chuck Yeager ran the Aerospace Research Pilot School (ARPS), a U.S. Air Force program that had sent some of its graduates into the NASA Astronaut Corps. According to Yeager, Air Force General Curtis LeMay called and told him: "Bobby Kennedy wants a colored in space. Get one into your course." Dwight was supposedly selected to enter ARPS shortly after this phone call. According to Dwight, civil rights leader Whitney Young personally advocated the idea of a Black astronaut to President Kennedy at a meeting involving Kennedy, Martin Luther King Jr., and A. Philip Randolph, and this was the "genesis of the administration's actions" that led to his selection as a trainee. In Dwight's telling, this meeting occurred in 1959, before Young became director of the National Urban League and while Kennedy was a U.S. senator from Massachusetts. While Dwight affirms that Young personally "confided that story" to him, Young's biographer states that this purported meeting did not happen. Regardless, it was the president who selected him to enter the program, when in 1961 Dwight "received a letter from the Pentagon, authorised by President John F Kennedy, asking him if he'd like to become the first black astronaut." Dwight's selection into the Air Force program garnered international media attention, and he appeared on the covers of news magazines such as Ebony, Jet, and Sepia.

During an interview with French media outlet Radio Campus Orléans in October 2024, Dwight claimed that President Kennedy asked Wernher Von Braun if he could include a black astronaut in NASA's program, which Von Braun refused on the grounds that it would "destroy NASA with a fight with black people at NASA".

Dwight proceeded to Phase II of ARPS, and "placed eighth as a contender for Nasa's Astronaut Group 3 in October 1963," but "[o]nly the first seven" on this list "were selected." Dwight was one of the "26 potential astronauts recommended to NASA by the Air Force," but NASA did not ultimately select him. Dwight has stated, "The day the president got killed, my life changed." Kennedy died on a Friday and, according to Dwight, by Monday "he had papers in his mailbox shipping him out to Germany." However, after meeting with Dwight, Attorney General Robert F. Kennedy "had the Pentagon cancel those orders," and a day later he received new papers "sending him to Canada." In January 1964, Dwight was stationed at Wright-Patterson Air Force Base in Ohio. Dwight resigned from the Air Force in 1966, claiming, according to The Guardian, that "racial politics had forced him out of NASA and into the regular officer corps". Nonetheless, he denies being bitter about the experience, stating: "Here you get a little 5-foot-four guy who flies airplanes and the next thing you know this guy is in the White House meeting all these senators and congressmen," remarking that it "opened the world to me.”

In August 2020, Dwight was made an honorary United States Space Force member in Washington, D.C.

==== Sculpting ====
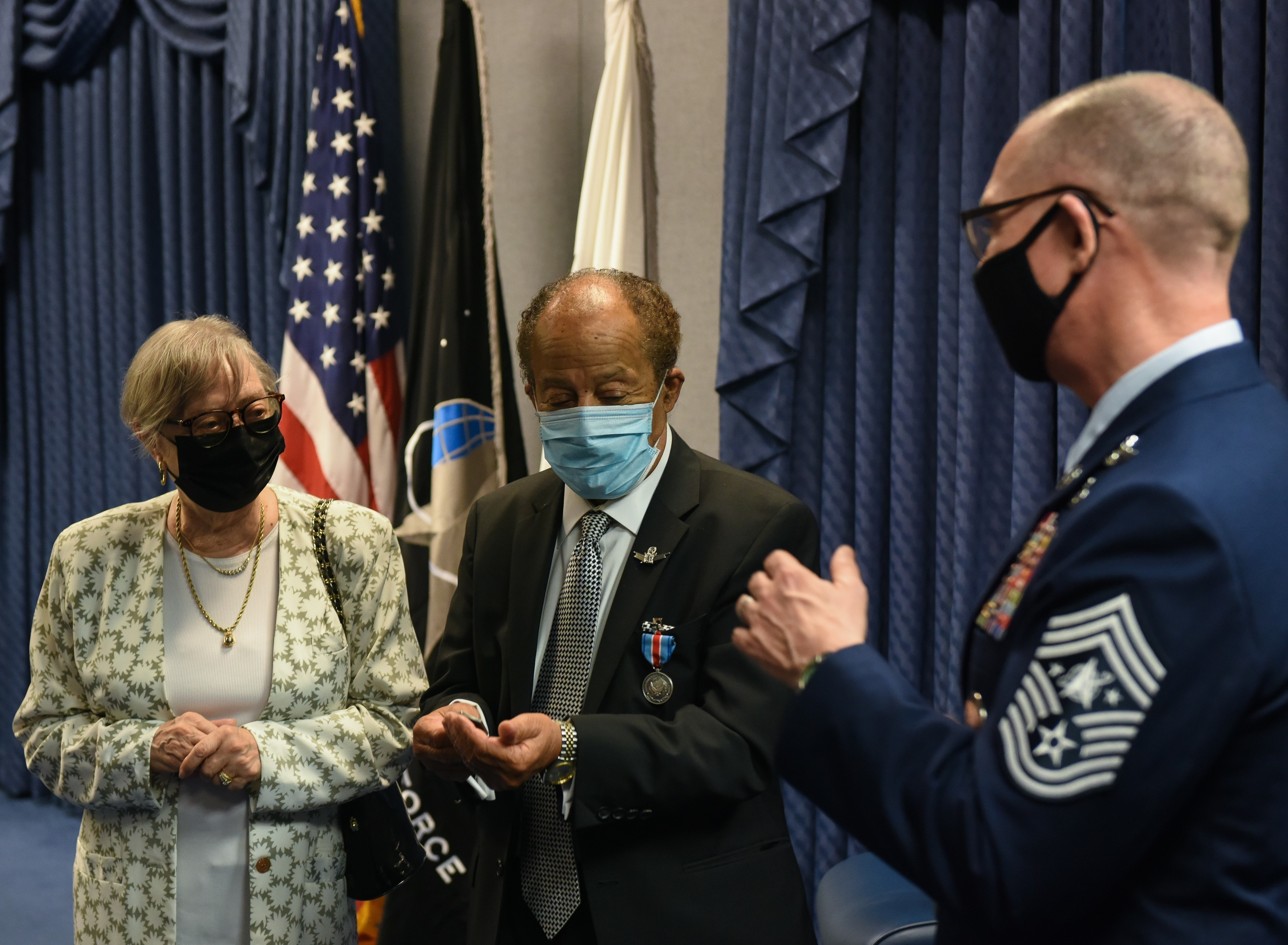
Dwight at the Pentagon in 2020, during his honorary induction into the U.S. Space Force.

After resigning from the Air Force, Dwight worked as an engineer, in real estate, and for IBM. He opened a barbecue restaurant in Denver. Dwight was also a successful construction entrepreneur and occasionally "built things with scrap metal". Dwight's artistic interest in sculpting and interest in learning about black historical icons grew after Colorado's first black lieutenant governor, George L. Brown, commissioned him to create a statue for the state capitol building in 1974. Upon completion, Dwight moved to Denver and earned an M.F.A. in sculpture from the University of Denver in 1977. He learned how to operate the University of Denver's metal casting foundry in the mid-1970s.

Dwight has been recognized for his innovative use of negative space in sculpting. Each of his pieces depict Black Americans and civil rights activists, with a focus on the themes of slavery, emancipation, and post-reconstruction. Most of the pieces depict only Black people, but the Underground Railroad Sculpture in Battle Creek also honors Erastus and Sarah Hussey, who were conductors on the Underground Railroad. Dwight's first major work was a commission in 1974 to create a sculpture of Colorado Lieutenant Governor George L. Brown. Soon after, he was commissioned by the Colorado Centennial Commission to create a series of bronze sculptures entitled "Black Frontier in the American West".

Soon after he completed the "Black Frontier in the American West" exhibit, Dwight created a series of more than seventy bronze sculptures at the St. Louis Arch Museum at the request of the National Park Service. The series, "Jazz: An American Art Form", depicts the evolution of jazz and features jazz performers such as Louis Armstrong, Miles Davis, Duke Ellington, Ella Fitzgerald, Benny Goodman, and Charlie Parker.

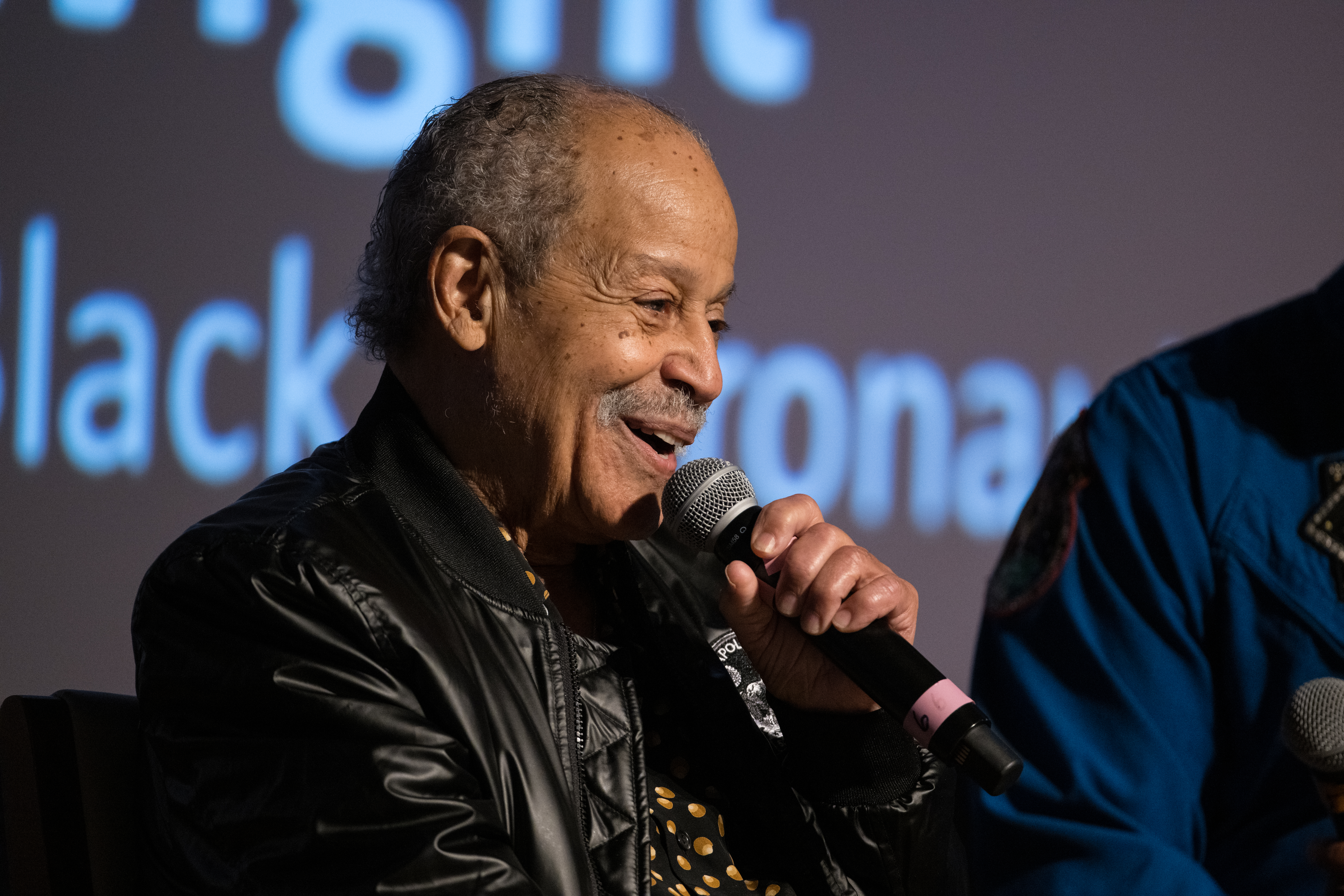
Dwight speaks at the National Museum of African American History and Culture in 2024.

Dwight owns and operates Ed Dwight Studios, based in Denver. Its 25,000 square feet (2,300 m^{2}), facility houses a studio, gallery, foundry, and a large collection of research material. The gallery and studio is open to the public.

==== Suborbital spaceflight on New Shepard ====
In 2024, Dwight was selected for a suborbital spaceflight mission and flew on Blue Origin's New Shepard NS-25, sponsored by Space For Humanity on May 19, 2024. He became the oldest person to fly in space at 90 years 8 months and 10 days, surpassing William Shatner by 48 days. Post-flight, Dwight articulated experiencing the overview effect, "Out the window, I could see the Earth. Everything looked ordered and neat and wonderful and beautiful. There was no separation between countries or states. And you ask yourself: As wonderful as it all is, why can’t the people who live on it get along? Why don’t they want to take care of such a beautiful place?"

The other members of the crew were Mason Angel, Sylvain Chiron, Carol Schaller, Kenneth Hess and Thotakura Gopichand. Victor Glover, former NASA administrator Charles Bolden, Leland D. Melvin, Bernard A. Harris Jr. and Livingston L. Holder Jr. attended the launch.

== Awards and honors ==
- 1986 – Honorary doctorate from Arizona State University
- 2020 – Air Force Commander's Award for Public Service
- 2020 – Bonfils-Stanton Foundation Artist Award
- 2021 – Asteroid 92579 Dwight
- 2022 – University of Denver CAHSS Lifetime Achievement Award

== Personal life ==
Dwight was raised and is Catholic, and served as an altar boy. In 1997, he was the lead sculptor on the statue of the Madonna and Child for the Our Mother of Africa Chapel, a structure devoted to African-American Catholics in the Basilica of the National Shrine of the Immaculate Conception, the largest church in North America. Dwight was the only black artist involved in the project. He was inducted into Phi Beta Sigma fraternity as an honorary brother at their 2023 conclave, held in Houston, Texas.

== Sculptures ==
As of late 2024, Dwight has created 132 memorial sculptures and over 20,000 gallery pieces, which include paintings and sculptures. His works include these:

Name	Picture	Location	Unveiled	Notes
African American History Monument		South Carolina State House grounds – Columbia, South Carolina	March 29, 2001	
Alex Haley / Kunta Kinte Memorial		The City Dock – Annapolis, Maryland	December 1999	
Black Revolutionary War Patriots Memorial		Constitution Gardens – Washington, D.C.	1991	
Captain Walter Dyett Statue		Chicago, Illinois		
Concerto		Folly Theater – Kansas City, Missouri		
Dr. Benjamin Mays		Morehouse College Commons – Atlanta, Georgia		
Dr. Martin Luther King Jr.		Anne Arundel Community College – Annapolis, Maryland	2006	
Statue of Martin Luther King Jr.		Houston, Texas	2007	
Dr. Martin Luther King Jr. Memorial		City Park – Denver, Colorado	2002	
Dr. Martin Luther King Jr. & Coretta Scott King		Allentown, Pennsylvania	2011	
Gateway to Freedom International Memorial to the Underground Railroad		Philip A. Hart Plaza – Detroit, Michigan	2001	
George Washington Williams bust		Ohio Statehouse – Columbus, Ohio		
Hank Aaron		Atlanta–Fulton County Stadium – Atlanta, Georgia	1982	
Inauguration of History and Hope – Inaugural Sculpture Scene of President Barack Obama		Touring exhibit	2010	
Jack Trice Memorial		Iowa State University – Ames, Iowa		
Jazz: An American Art Form		St. Louis Arch Museum – St. Louis, Missouri		
John Hope Franklin Tower of Reconciliation		Tulsa, Oklahoma		
Mayor Harold Washington		Harold Washington Cultural Center – Chicago, Illinois	2004	
Memorial to Rosa Parks, Mother of the Civil Rights Movement		Grand Rapids, Michigan	2010	
Mother of Africa Chapel		Basilica of the National Shrine of the Immaculate Conception – Washington, D.C.	1997	
Mr. Frederick Douglass		Frederick Douglass National Historic Site – Washington, D.C.	1980	Dwight's first commission
Quincy Jones Sculpture Park		Chicago, Illinois		
Soldiers Memorial		Lincoln University – Jefferson City, Missouri	2007	
Texas African American History Memorial		Texas State Capitol – Austin, Texas	November 19, 2016	Erected by the Texas African American History Memorial Foundation.
Tower of Freedom International Memorial to the Underground Railroad		Civic Esplanade – Windsor, Ontario	2001	
Underground Railroad Memorial		Kellogg Foundation headquarters – Battle Creek, Michigan	1994	
United House of Prayer for All People		Lincoln Cemetery – Suitland, Maryland	2008	
William E. Smith, Director of Airports		Denver, Colorado		
Denmark Vesey Monument		Charleston, South Carolina	2014	

Furthermore, Dwight said in October 2024 that he was currently working on a memorial to Normandy beaches in honor of the black soldiers of World War II.

== See also ==
- Tuskegee Airmen
- Robert Henry Lawrence Jr.
