= Texas African American History Memorial =

Memorial and sculpture by Ed Dwight in Austin, Texas, U.S.

- The memorial in 2017
- Artist: Ed Dwight
- Year: 2016
- Location: Austin, Texas, United States; 30.2733°N 97.7415°W

The Texas African American History Memorial is an outdoor monument commemorating the impact of African Americans in Texas, installed on the Texas State Capitol grounds in Austin, Texas, United States. The memorial was sculpted by Ed Dwight and erected by the Texas African American History Memorial Foundation in 2016. It describes African American history from the 1500s to present, and includes depictions of Hendrick Arnold and Barbara Jordan, as well as Juneteenth (June 19, 1865), when African Americans were emancipated.

== See also ==
- 2016 in art
