= Air Force Meritorious Civilian Service Award =

United States Air Force award

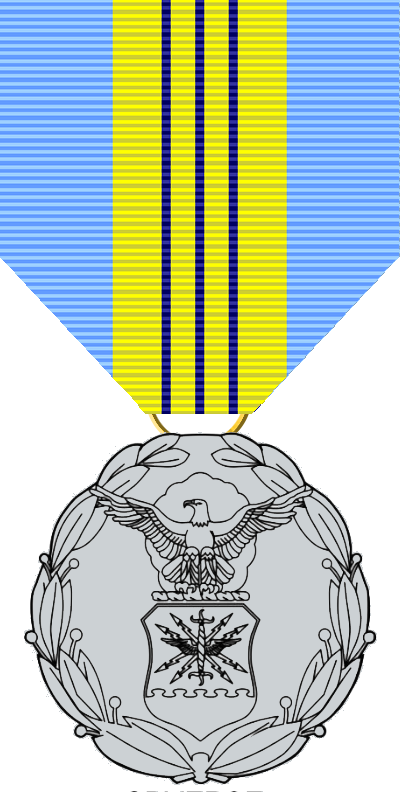
- Meritorious Civilian Service Award medal
- Awarded for: "outstanding service to the Air Force in the performance of duties in an exemplary manner."
- Country: United States
- Presented by: Department of the Air Force
- Eligibility: Air Force civilian employees
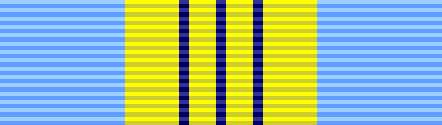
- Ribbon

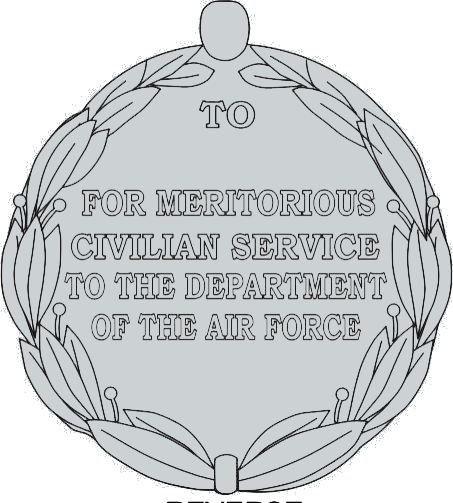
- Reverse

Precedence
- Next (higher): Air Force Civilian Award for Valor
- Next (lower): Air Force Command Civilian Award for Valor

The Air Force Meritorious Civilian Service Award is the fourth-highest award granted to civilian personnel by the United States Department of the Air Force. It consists of a medal, lapel button, and citation certificate. Nominees must have established a pattern of exemplary service over at least one year.

== Eligibility ==
The Meritorious Civilian Service Award may be awarded for performance of assigned duties for at least one year in an exemplary manner, with a reasonable degree of command-wide mission impact, setting a record of individual achievement and serving as an incentive to others to improve the quality and quantity of their work performance. Employees may also be considered for:

- Exercising unusual initiative in devising new and improved work methods and procedures that result in a substantial savings in manpower, time, materials, or other items of expense
- Improving safety or health of employees
- Improving morale of employees in a unit which resulted in improvement of work performance and esprit de corps.

This award may also be given at the time of retirement.

== Description ==
The medal of the award is an oxidized finish silver plated disc, 1 1/2 in (38 mm) in diameter. On the obverse in the center is the coat of arms of the Air Force as found on the Flag of the United States Air Force. The reverse of the medal is inscribed TO, with a space for engraving a name, and FOR MERITORIOUS CIVILIAN SERVICE TO THE DEPARTMENT OF THE AIR FORCE. The edge on both sides is surrounded by a laurel wreath. The medal is suspended from a Brittany blue ribbon 1 3/8 in (35 mm) wide with a 9/16 in (14 mm) wide central stripe of Air Force Yellow, equally divided by three 1/32 in (0.79 mm) width stripes of Ultramarine Blue.

== See also ==
- Awards and decorations of the United States government
