= Air Force Commander's Award for Public Service =

Air Force Commander's Public Service Award
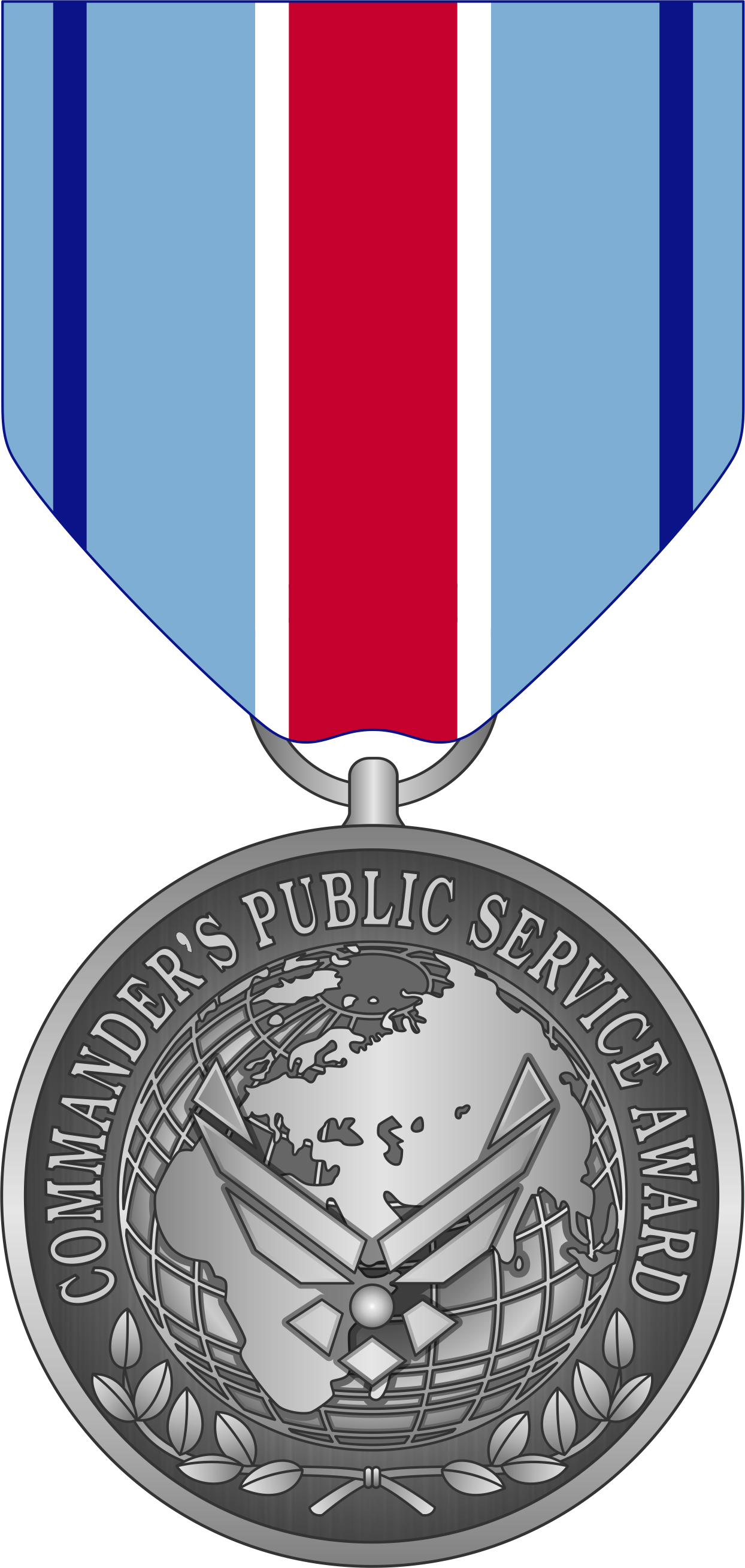
- Commander's Public Service Award Medal
- Country: United States
- Presented by: Secretary of the Air Force
- Eligibility: Non-Employee Civilians "who have assisted [the Air Force] with specific achievements, major unit projects or helped a unit reach major milestones, or who have provided support to the base/unit over a set and limited period of time."
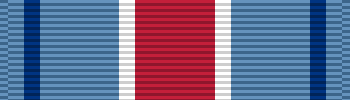
- Ribbon

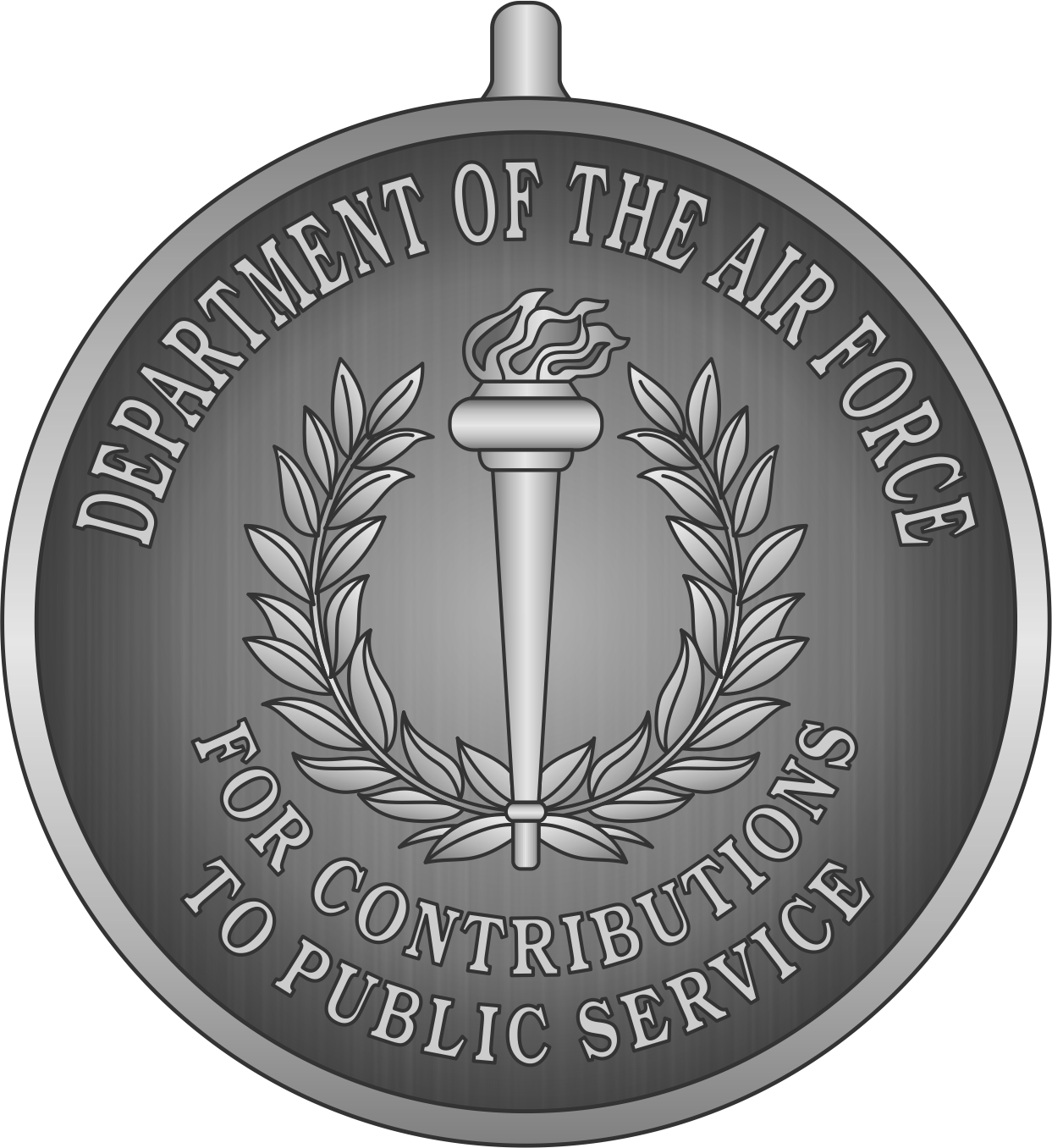
- Reverse

Precedence
- Next (higher): Secretary of the Air Force Distinguished Public Service Award
- Next (lower): Certificate of Appreciation

The Department of the Air Force Commander's Public Service Award is a lower level award granted by the Secretary of the Air Force to a non-employee civilian. It consists of a cased medal, ribbon, and lapel button, as well as a citation certificate.

The award was created in 2005 to further supplement the U.S. Department of the Air Force's awards for non-employees and in the following year a higher level awarded was similarly created namely the Air Force's "Distinguished Public Service Award."

The medal is silver in color and suspended on a ribbon which is largely pale blue with symmetrical stripes in dark blue, red, and white.

== Eligibility ==
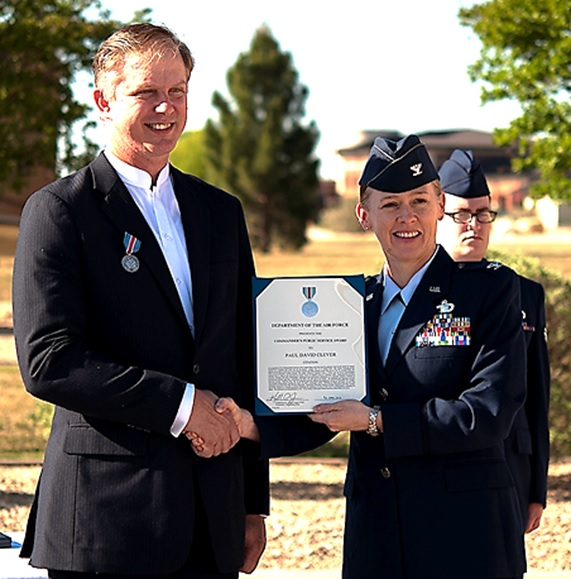
A Commander's Public Service Award Presentation at Goodfellow Air Force Base, Texas

According to Department guidelines "[c]itizens of entities (groups, business firms or organizations) not employed by the Department of AF, who have assisted with specific achievements, major unit projects or helped a unit reach major milestones, or who have provided support to the base/unit over a set and limited period of time. Service must clearly demonstrate specific examples of how the citizen's dedication and commitment significantly contributed to the improvement of conditions for base personnel, facilities or mission. AF policy expressly prohibits recognizing individuals or entities in a commercial or profit making relationship with the DoD (to include contractors) with this award (refer to paragraph 7.2 of this publication). A civic leader may only receive this award once every five years. The nomination must contain comments that the services cited were voluntary, performed as a public service, or motivated by patriotism with no implication to remuneration, and that the person recommended had no commercial or profit-making relationship with the AF."

== Examples of Service and Related Information ==
Air Force Commendation Medal

Examples of award worthy achievements include, but are not limited to:

"Significant achievements which resulted in significant savings of time, manpower, or money to the government. Achievement and effort in the areas of humanitarian efforts, mission impact, unit facilities, and/or support of unit personnel. Personal time and/or resources expended that helped achieve a successful project outcome."

This award is roughly comparable to the Air Force Commendation Medal for military service members and if worn by those who later join a uniformed service this award comes before general service medals, for example, but after military decorations or unit citations.

Note this award is often erroneously labelled as the "Commander's Award for Public Service" however according to its citation and the regulations governing its awarding it is officially referred to as the "Commander's Public Service Award."

== Notable recipients ==
Vice Commander of Osan Air Base, ROK presenting Chaplain James A. Moser Commander's Public Service Award (2017.)

- Mr. Paul and Mrs. Nita Clever - For "distinguished service in recovering human remains from a (1969) Vietnam crash site..."
- Ms. Hillary Merritt - For work as the Trust for Public Land project manager and contributions to an Air Force Agency.
- Chaplain, Major James Moser - For 20 years distinguished volunteer service as a member of Civil Air Patrol and in support of Air Force Chaplain Corps service in PACAF prior to joining the US Air Force Reserve.
- Major General (Ret.) Dr. Ronald M. Sega - For service in an advisory capacity to the Secretary of the Air Force and contributed immeasurable to Air Force education.
- Mr. Conner Thomas - For "extensive support of veterans in his community, including raising more than $10,000 to help homeless..."
- Ed Dwight - Former Air Force captain and the first African-American astronaut candidate. For "...contributions to the U.S., space, and history during times of overt racism in the field of science."

== See also ==
- Awards and decorations of the United States government
