= Air Force Outstanding Civilian Career Service Award =

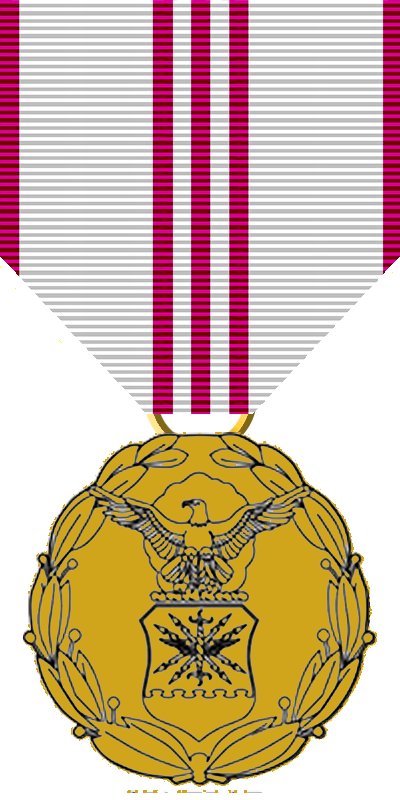
- Awarded for: Outstanding civilian service to the US Air Force
- Sponsored by: Department of the Air Force
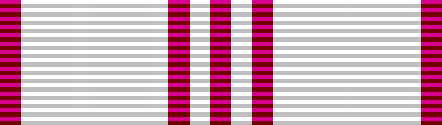
- Ribbon

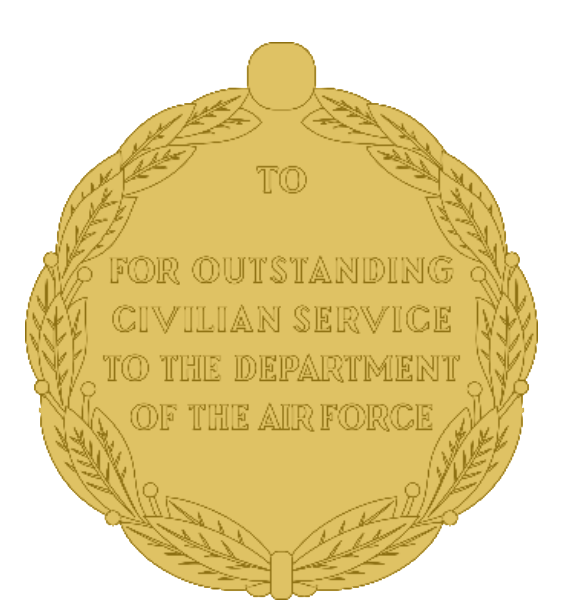
- Reverse

Precedence
- Next (higher): Department of the Air Force Decoration for Exceptional Civilian Service
- Next (lower): Air Force Civilian Award for Valor

The Air Force Outstanding Civilian Career Service Award is an award of the Secretary of the Air Force to recognize outstanding civilian employees at the time of their retirement.

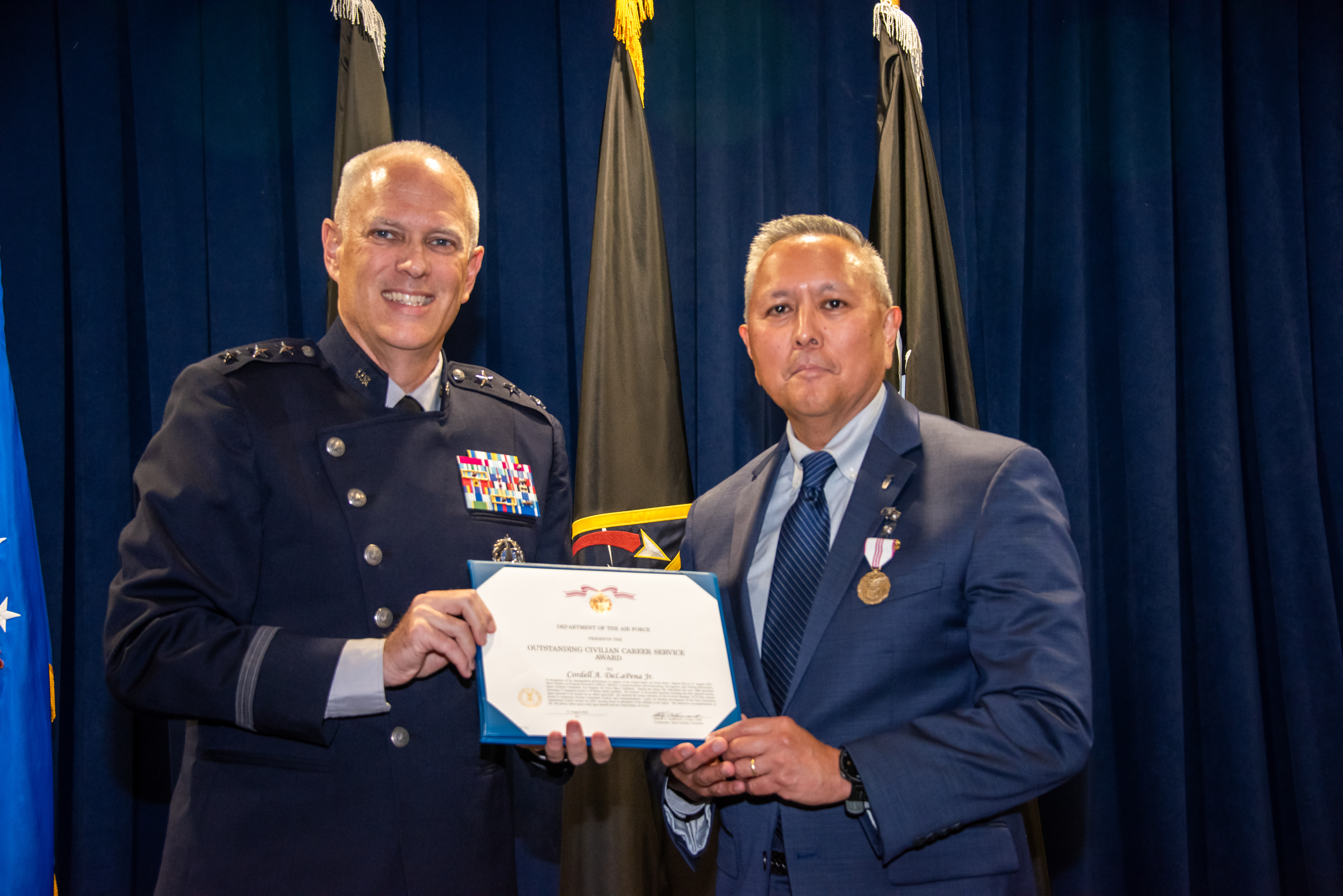
U.S. Space Force Lt. Gen. Philip Garrant, presents Mr. Cordell A. DeLaPena Jr., with the Department of the Air Force Outstanding Civilian Career Service Award during his retirement at Los Angeles Air Force Base, El Segundo, Calif.

== Description ==
According to the Department of the Air Force Civilian Recognition Program, the medal is bronze-colored with the Department of the Air Force coat of arms inside a laurel wreath. The ribbon is white, with three thin maroon strips in the center and one on either side.

== Eligibility ==
The award can be given to civilian employees who, throughout their career, provided leadership or unusual competence, and their noteworthy accomplishments had a significant impact upon the Department of the Air Force mission.
