= Remote Combat Effects Campaign Medal =

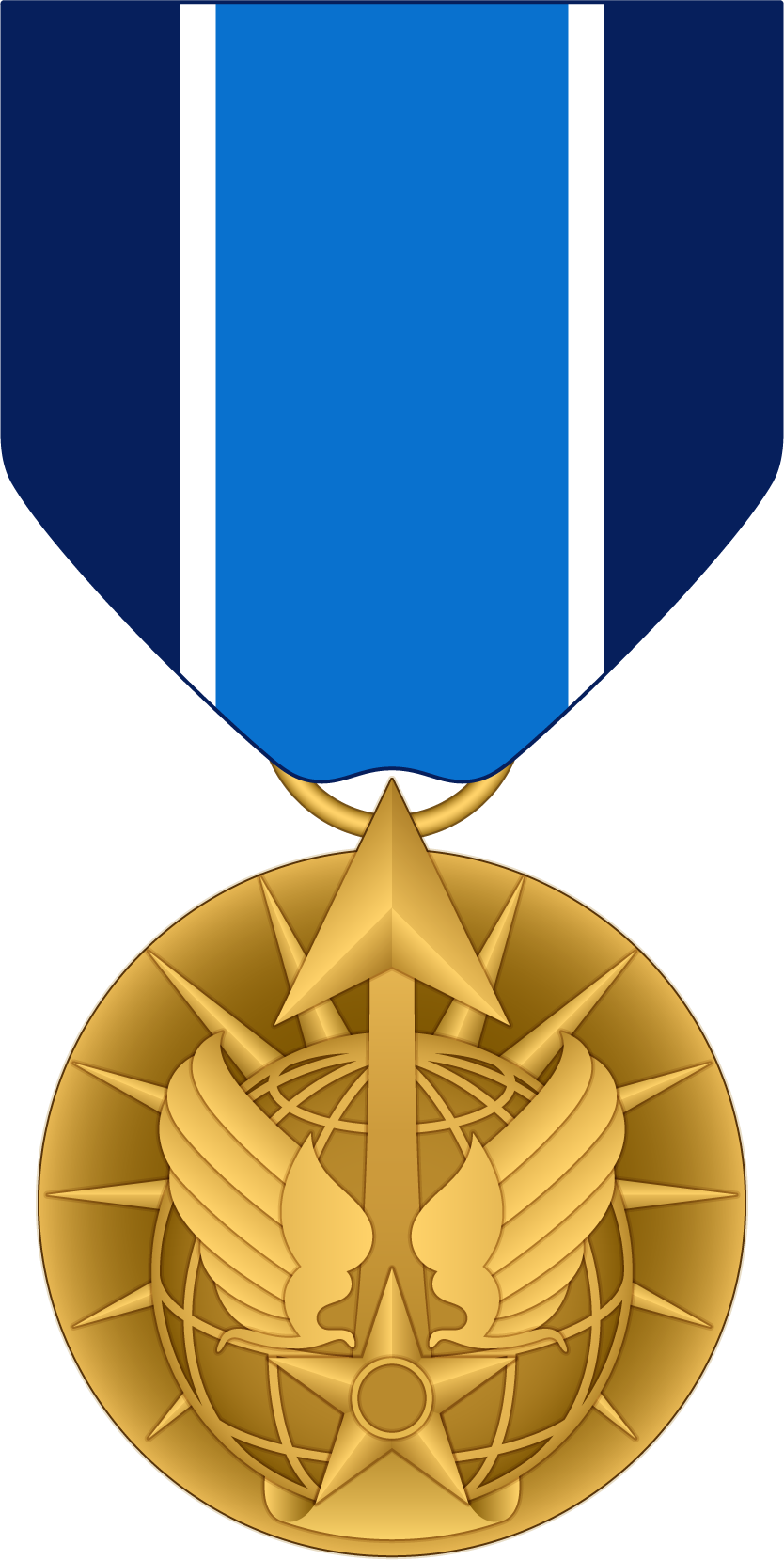
- Obverse
- Type: Military medal Service medal
- Awarded for: Participating in a combat operation from a remote location in a non-deployed status on or after September 11, 2001
- Presented by: the U.S. Department of the Air Force
- Eligibility: U.S. Air Force and U.S. Space Force personnel
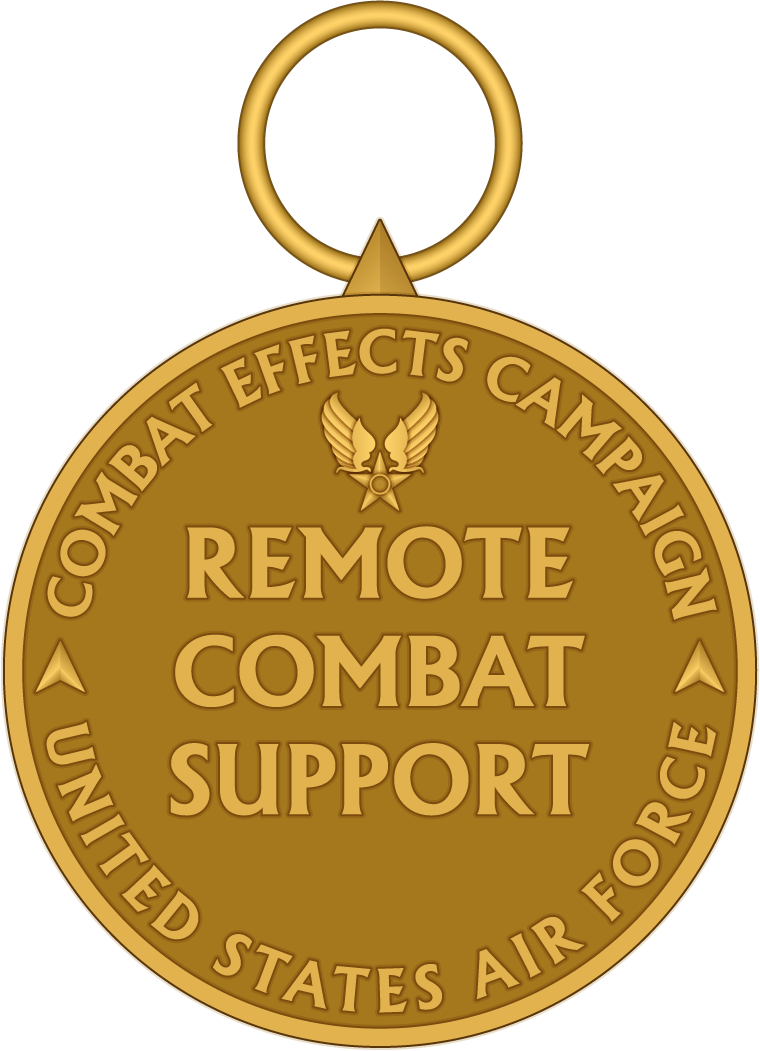
- Reverse
- Status: Currently awarded
- Established: 22 May 2019
- First award: 2019 (retroactive to September 11, 2001)
- Service ribbon of the medal

Precedence
- Next (higher): Military Outstanding Volunteer Service Medal
- Next (lower): Air and Space Campaign Medal

The Remote Combat Effects Campaign Medal (RCECM) is a United States Air Force and United States Space Force campaign medal established on 22 May 2019. The medal recognizes air force personnel, "in non-deployed status who directly participated in a U.S. Department of Defense (DoD) combat operation from a remote location.

== Eligibility ==
The RCECM will be awarded to airmen and guardians serving in remotely piloted aircraft, cyber, space and intelligence, surveillance and reconnaissance career fields, who create direct combat effects from remote locations and lead to strategic outcomes or the delivery of lethal force. In some circumstances, airmen and guardians from other career fields may be considered for the RCECM, which will be considered on a case-by-case basis.

Service members may be awarded the RCECM for actions completed on or after 11 September 2001, while also serving under the following conditions:

1. Was assigned or attached to a unit directly in support of a DoD combat operation as approved by the chief of staff of the Air Force (listed below)
2. Was serving in a remotely piloted aircraft; cyber; space or intelligence, surveillance and reconnaissance career field
3. Personally provided hands-on employment of a weapon system that had direct and immediate impact on combat operations
4. Was not physically exposed to hostile actions or at risk of exposure to hostile action

=== Qualifying campaigns ===
Qualifying DoD combat operations:

Operation	From	To
Enduring Freedom (OEF)	11 September 2001	28 December 2014
Iraqi Freedom (OIF)	19 March 2003	31 August 2010
Nomad Shadow (ONS)	5 November 2007	TBD
New Dawn (OND)	1 September 2010	31 December 2011
Inherent Resolve (OIR)	15 June 2014	30 March 2016
Freedom's Sentinel (OFS)	1 January 2015	31 August 2021
Odyssey Lightning (OOL)	1 August 2016	19 December 2016
Operation Pacific Eagle (OPE–P)	5 October 2017	TBD

Eligible personnel will be only awarded one medal upon meeting the initial criteria for the award. A separate bronze campaign star is worn on the medal suspension or ribbon to recognize each qualifying DoD combat operation in which the personnel participated for one or more days.

== Description ==
The medal bears a bronze color 1 ¼ inch metal disc bearing a starburst. The starburst behind the grid-lined sphere conveys power and the ability to remotely effect the battlefield, anywhere in the world. The delta followed by the contrail portrays the remotely piloted aircraft and weapons systems. The Hap Arnold symbol denotes the U.S. Air Force. The reverse bears a circular inscription, “COMBAT EFFECTS CAMPAIGN” above, and “UNITED STATES AIR FORCE” below, and a “Hap Arnold” symbol above a stacked inscription that reads “REMOTE COMBAT SUPPORT”. A pair of beveled deltas flank the circular inscription.

The ribbon is predominantly blue, with a wide light blue center stripe flanked on either side by a narrow white stripe. The colors represent the U.S. Air Force.
