= Department of the Air Force Decoration for Exceptional Civilian Service =

Air Force Decoration for Exceptional Civilian Service
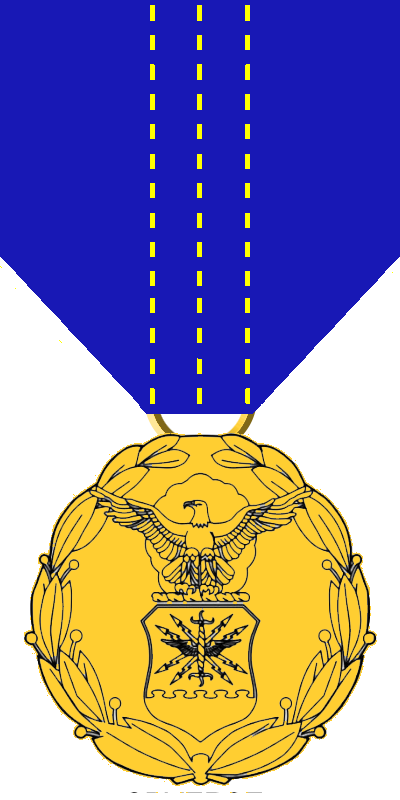
- Country: United States
- Presented by: Secretary of the Air Force
- Eligibility: "Profound Air Force-wide impact to programs or projects as documented by development of improved methods or procedures, initiation of revolutionary ideas, or unprecedented achievements or benefits to the government."
- Ribbon

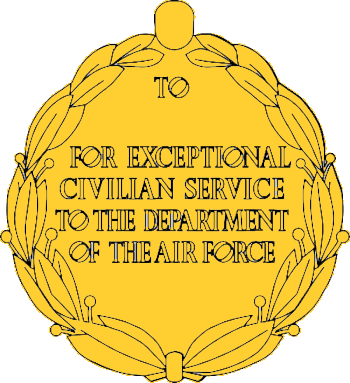
- Reverse

Precedence
- Next (lower): Air Force Outstanding Civilian Career Service Award

The Department of the Air Force Decoration for Exceptional Civilian Service is the highest award granted by the Secretary of the Air Force to civilian employees of the U.S. Department of the Air Force. It consists of a medal, lapel button, and citation certificate. With the exception of nominations for bravery, nominees must have established a demonstrable pattern of excellence and achievement which normally have been recognized by previous awards up to and including the Meritorious Civilian Service Award.

The ribbon is blue with three yellow dashed vertical stripes.

== Eligibility ==
Eligibility is determined by measuring contributions against the following example levels of achievement:

- Accomplished assigned duties of major program significance to the Department of the Air Force in such a way as to have been clearly exceptional or preeminent among all persons who have performed similar duties.
- Developed and improved major methods and procedures, developed significant inventions, or was responsible for exceptional achievements that effected large-scale savings or were of major significance in advancing the missions of the Department of the Air Force, Department of Defense, and the Federal government of the United States.
- Provided outstanding leadership to the administration of major Air Force programs resulting in highly successful mission accomplishment or in the major redirection of objectives or accomplishments to meet unique or emergency situations.
- Exhibited great courage and voluntary risk of life in performing an act resulting in direct benefit to the Government or its personnel.

This award is comparable to the Air Force Distinguished Service Medal for military service members.

== See also ==
- Awards and decorations of the United States government
