= Caldwell Hall (Catholic University of America) =

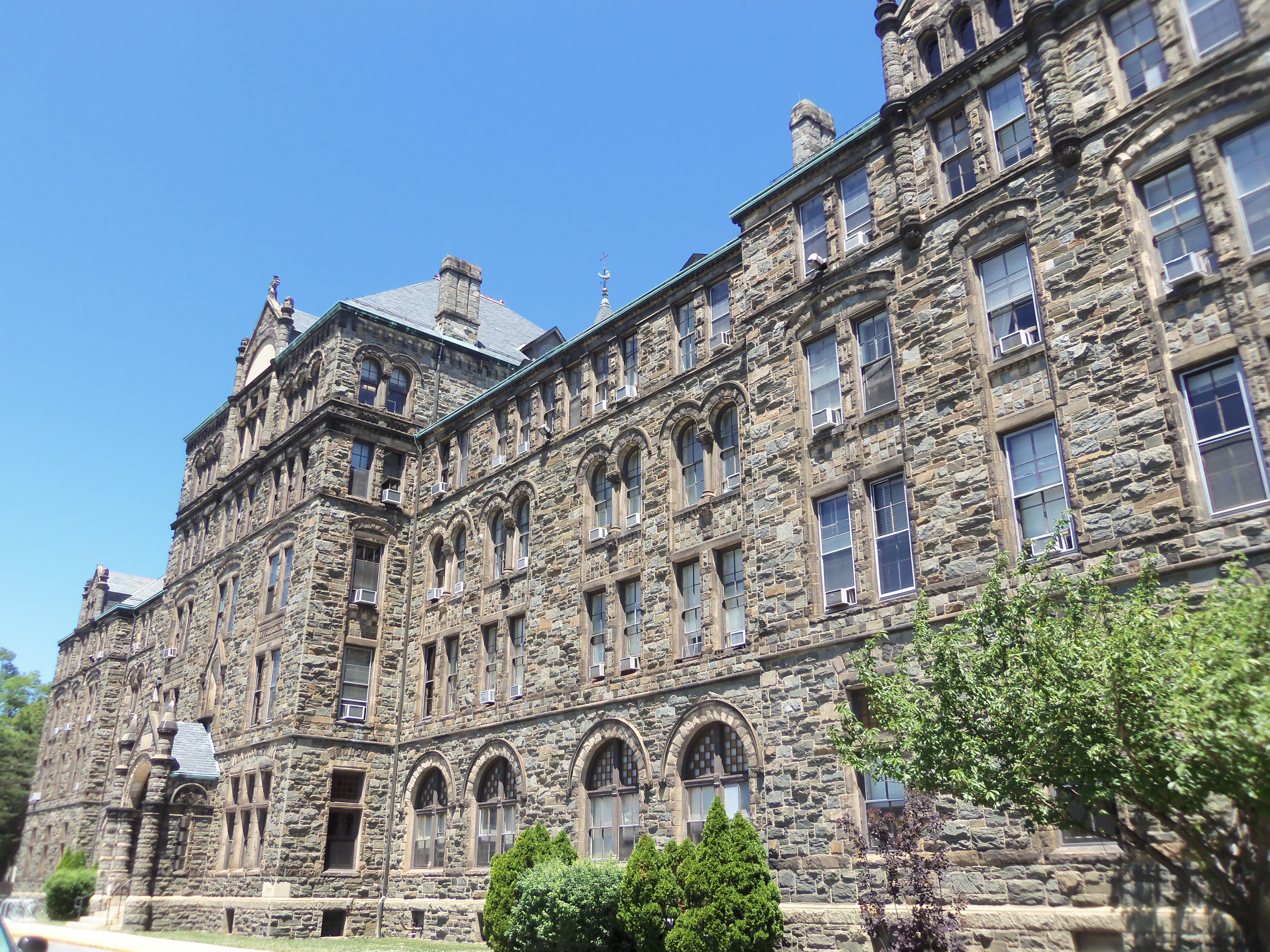
- Caldwell Hall in 2013
- Interactive map of the Caldwell Hall area

General information
- Type: Dormitory
- Location: 620 Michigan Ave., N.E. Washington, DC 20064; United States
- Coordinates: 38°56′08″N 77°00′02″W
- Completed: May 24, 1888

Design and construction
- Architect: Ephraim Francis Baldwin

Caldwell Hall is a male dormitory for 42 upper-class students and one of 10 housing options for students at the Catholic University of America. Cardinal James Gibbons, Archbishop of Baltimore, and President Grover Cleveland dedicated the building on May 24, 1888. It was named for Mary Gwendolin Caldwell. Sealed in the cornerstone is the original letter dated April 10, 1887 from Pope Leo XIII approving the University's founding. The building contains a chapel, paid for by Caldwell's sister, Mary Elizabeth, and a wing of the building known as "the House," which is inhabited by student ministers.

== Schools ==
Caldwell Hall houses the School of Canon Law as well as the School of Theology and Religious Studies.
