= Patrick McCormick =

Patrick McCormick may refer to:

- Patrick Joseph McCormick (1880-1953), American prelate of the Roman Catholic Church
- Patrick McCormick (footballer) (1914-1991), English footballer, see List of Oldham Athletic A.F.C. players (25–99 appearances)
- Patrick McCormick (producer), see BAFTA Award for Best Film
- Patrick McCormick (golfer), see Maryland Open
