= Murry Sidlin =

Murry Sidlin (born 1940 in Baltimore, United States) is an American conductor and professor.

== Early life and education ==
Sidlin was born in Baltimore, Maryland, in 1940. He studied at the Peabody Institute, where he graduated in 1968 with a master's degree.

== Career ==
Sidlin's first appointment after graduating was as Assistant Conductor at the Baltimore Symphony Orchestra under Sergiu Comissiona. He was later appointed Resident conductor at the National Symphony Orchestra under Antal Doráti, and with Oregon Symphony Orchestra. He was also the music director of the New Haven Symphony Orchestra, the Long Beach Symphony Orchestra, and the Tulsa Philharmonic.

For 32 years, he served as co-director (together with David Zinman) of the American Academy of Conducting at Aspen Festival. Alumni of the program during his tenure include Peter Oundjian, Cristian Macelaru, Tomas Netopil, Tito Muñoz, Philippe Bach, José De Eusebio, Hugh Wolff, James Gaffigan, Apo Hsu, Lawrence Golan, Kenneth Woods, Sasha Mäkilä, Kenneth Kiesler, Josep Caballé Domenech, and David Hayes.

In 2001, Sildin was named an Ordinary professor of Conducting at Catholic University of America's Benjamin T. Rome School of Music. The next year, he was named Dean of the School, a position he held until 2010.

== Memberships and awards ==
Sidlin is a member of Prague Society for International Cooperation, a NGO. In 2011, Sidlin was awarded the Johns Hopkins University Alumni Association’s Distinguished Alumni Award.
