= WCUA =

WCUA may refer to:

- WCUA (Catholic University of America), an unlicensed college radio station
- WCUA-LP, a defunct low-power radio station (101.9 FM) formerly licensed to serve Peoria, Illinois, United States
