= Sharon Christman =

American soprano and professor

Sharon Christman is an American soprano and professor. She serves as director of the Vocal Division of the Benjamin T. Rome School of Music, Catholic University of America, in Washington, DC.

== Early life ==
Christman started singing as a young child, and by the sixth grade she would sing in her parents' two-car garage. By the age of sixteen, she was singing in the lead role of Jules Massenet's Manon.

== Career ==
Christman sang the role of Queen of the Night at the New York City Opera's performance of The Magic Flute, a role she also played in 1990 in Milwaukee. Christman was one of the principals in the Los Angeles Opera's 1988 production of Die Fledermaus. Her first performance in Washington, D.C. was a 1991 performance of Anna Bolena at the Summer Opera Theatre. Her 1996 performance of Poliuto was described as "deeply expressive".

== Awards and honors ==
In 1981, Christman received the Puccini Award from the Baltimore Opera Company.
