= John H. Garvey =

Lawyer, former university president

15th President of the Catholic University of America
- In office July 1, 2010 – July 1, 2022
- Preceded by: David M. O'Connell
- Succeeded by: Peter Kilpatrick

Personal details
- Born: September 28, 1948 (age 77) Sharon, Pennsylvania, U.S.
- Spouse: Jeanne Walter Garvey
- Education: University of Notre Dame (BA); Harvard University (JD)
- Profession: University administrator, legal scholar

John Hugh Garvey (born September 28, 1948) is an American attorney and university administrator who served as the 15th president of the Catholic University of America from 2010 to 2022.

== Education ==
John H. Garvey attended the University of Notre Dame where he received a Bachelor of Arts degree in 1970. He was candidate for a Master of Theological Studies degree at Harvard Divinity School (1970–71), and then entered the Harvard Law School, where he earned a Juris Doctor degree in 1974.

== Career ==
Garvey was law clerk to Judge Irving R. Kaufman, United States Court of Appeals, Second Circuit from 1974 to 1975, associate of Morrison & Foerster, San Francisco, California, from 1975 to 1976, assistant to solicitor general Ted Olson in the Department of Justice in the Ronald Reagan administration, from 1981 to 1984, professor at the University of Kentucky College of Law from 1976 to 1994, visiting professor at the University of Michigan Law School from 1985 to 1986, professor at the Notre Dame Law School from 1994 to 1999 and dean of Boston College Law School from 1999 to 2010. In September 2009, Garvey joined 75 fellow Boston College Law faculty members in a letter denouncing the actions of faculty member Scott Fitzgibbon and stating that his statements critical of same-sex marriage were his personal opinion and not the teaching of the Law School. This has led to articles in Catholic Culture criticizing his later appointment as president of the Catholic University of America.

== Presidency of the Catholic University of America ==
On June 15, 2010, Garvey was appointed CUA's 15th president, effective July 1, 2010. He became the third lay president in the university's history.

In an article in the Wall Street Journal, Garvey announced the decision to change the Catholic University of America's dormitory policy, opting for single sex dormitories, instead of the more commonplace co-ed by floor policy. Although the decision was received relatively well with parents, many students and advocacy groups challenged the policy as a form of sexism. The DC Office of Human Rights dismissed a case filed by G.W. Law School Professor John Banzhaf, concluding that "same-sex dormitories do not constitute unlawful discrimination." The policy was gradually implemented into sophomore housing by 2012.

Garvey oversaw a restructuring of the University's board of trustees to allow for greater lay participation, and made improvements to residence halls, athletic fields, the school's counseling center, the Center for Cultural Engagement, and the Center for Academic and Career Success. During his tenure the university raised more than $500 million and the $400 million Light the Way campaign was so successful that, as of 2021, the university is considering raising the goal to $500 million. Student retention also increased by more than 11%. During the COVID-19 pandemic, Garvey took a 20% pay cut to help preserve jobs on campus. Other employees also took cuts.

On September 22, 2021, Garvey announced that he would be stepping down as president of Catholic University on June 30, 2022. He had considered making the move for several years, but promised to stay on to see the completion of a $400 million capital campaign. At the announcement of his retirement, he said he had been studying Italian in preparation for a move to Rome where he would teach at CUA's Rome campus.

Academic offices
Preceded by David M. O'Connell	President of the Catholic University of America; 2011–2022	Succeeded by Peter Kilpatrick
