= Catholic University of America School of Canon Law =

Roman Catholic university in United States of America

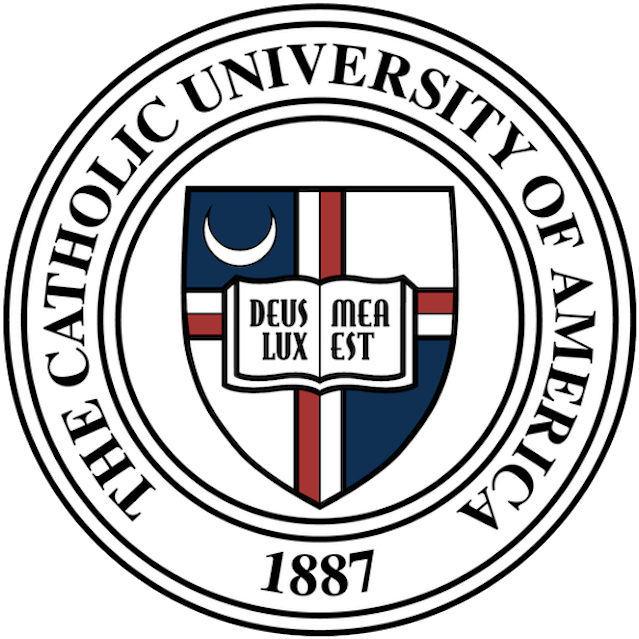
- Type: Ecclesiastical faculty
- Established: 1923; 103 years ago
- Parent institution: Catholic University of America
- Affiliations: Catholic Church
- Dean: Msgr. Ronny Jenkins
- Students: 81
- Location: Washington, D.C., U.S. 38°56′07.9″N 77°00′02.6″W
- Campus: Caldwell Hall (Catholic University of America)
- Website: canonlaw.cua.edu

The Catholic University of America School of Canon Law is the only faculty of Catholic canon law in the United States. It is one of the twelve schools at Catholic University of America, located in Washington, D.C., and one of the three ecclesiastical schools at the university, together with the School of Theology and Religious Studies and the School of Philosophy. The school is part of the main campus in the Brookland neighborhood in Northeast D.C. and is housed in Caldwell Hall. It offers the Licentiate of Canon Law and the Doctor of Canon Law ecclesiastical degrees, as well as civil and joint ecclesiastical-civil degree programs.

== History ==
Catholic University was empowered to grant ecclesiastical degrees in canon law by the apostolic letter of Leo XIII Magni nobis gaudii of 7 March 1889. The School of Theology issued canon law degrees until 1923, when a separate faculty of canon law was established by the Holy See. Catholic University is the only U.S. university with an ecclesiastical faculty of canon law.

== Degree programs ==
The School of Canon Law is the only graduate program in canon law in the United States and offers ecclesiastical, civil, and dual degree programs:

=== Ecclesiastical ===
- J.C.L.
- J.C.D.

=== Civil ===
- Masters in Church Administration (M.C.A.)

=== Dual civil/ecclesiastical ===
Along with the Columbus School of Law, the School of Canon Law jointly accepts certain credits from the Juris Doctor program toward the degree requirements for the Licentiate of Canon Law. Each school issues their degree by their own authority, so a graduate will receive 2 separate degrees: one civil (J.D.), the other ecclesiastical (J.C.L.).

== The Jurist ==
The Jurist is the only journal published in the United States devoted to the study and promotion of the canon law of the Catholic Church. It was initiated in 1940 to serve the academic and professional needs of Catholic church lawyers. It originally focused on the canon law of the Latin Church, but came to include Eastern Catholic canon law as well. Beginning with volume 71, the journal has been published for the School of Canon Law by the Catholic University of America Press. The editorial board consists of the faculty of the School of Canon Law. The journal is published in print form, but also forms part of the electronic collection Project MUSE.

== Institute on Matrimonial Tribunal Practice ==
Since 1967, the School of Canon Law has organized an annual program via the Institute on Matrimonial Tribunal Practice, designed for those without formal training in canon law.
