= Joseph M. Corrigan =

Catholic bishop (1879–1942)

Most Reverend Joseph M. Corrigan
- Rector of The Catholic University of America
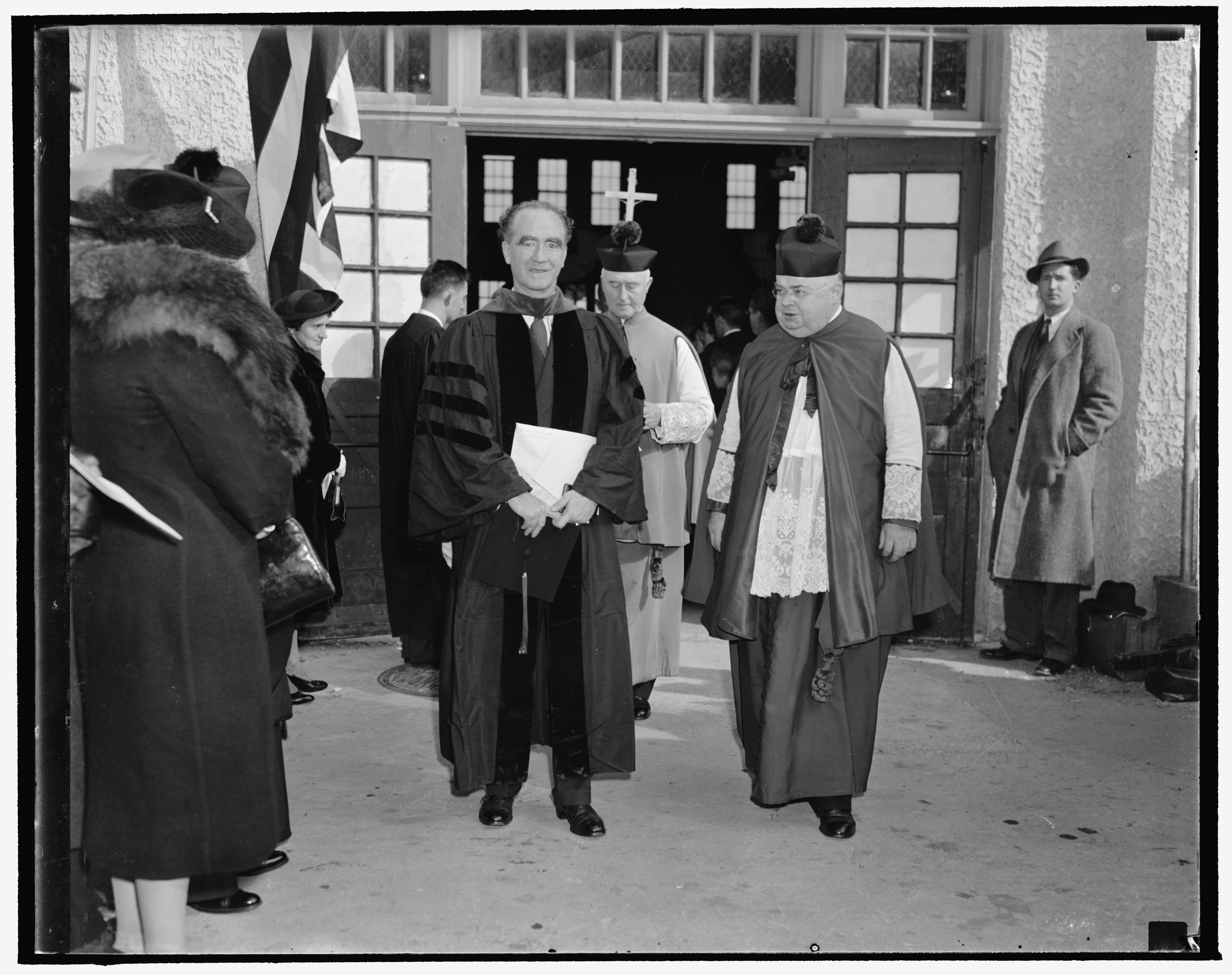
- Corrigan (right)
- Church: Catholic Church
- See: Titular See of Bilta
- Appointed: February 3, 1940
- In office: April 2, 1940 – June 9, 1942

Orders
- Ordination: June 6, 1903 by Pietro Respighi
- Consecration: April 2, 1940 by Michael Joseph Curley

Personal details
- Born: May 18, 1879 Philadelphia, Pennsylvania
- Died: June 9, 1942 (aged 63) Washington, D.C.

Joseph M. Corrigan (May 18, 1879 – June 9, 1942) was a bishop of the Catholic Church in the United States. He served as the sixth rector of The Catholic University of America from 1936 to 1942.

== Biography ==
=== Early life and education ===
Joseph Moran Corrigan was born in Philadelphia, Pennsylvania. He completed his studies for the priesthood in Rome at the Pontifical North American College. Kennedy was ordained a priest in Rome for the Archdiocese of Philadelphia on June 6, 1903, by Cardinal Pietro Respighi, the Vicar General of Rome.

=== Priesthood ===
After he returned to Pennsylvania, Corrigan served as an assistant pastor in several parishes, director of the Madonna House and settlement work with Italian immigrants, Director of Catholic Charities in the archdiocese and the Catholic Children’s Bureau. He also served on the board of directors of the Community Council of Philadelphia (the Welfare Federation), as the state chaplain of the Pennsylvania State Council of the Knights of Columbus, as a judge on the archdiocesan marriage tribunal, moderator of the priests’ vigilance committee and retreat master for the Philadelphia Laymen’s Weekend Retreat League.

Corrigan joined the faculty and served as rector of St. Charles Borromeo Seminary from 1918 to 1936. Pope Pius XI named him a Domestic Prelate with the title of Monsignor in 1918. Corrigan was named the rector of The Catholic University of America in 1936. During his time as rector Curley Hall was built, and he was among five American Catholic leaders and a politician who condemned Nazi violence against the Jews in a radio broadcast on November 16, 1938.

=== Episcopacy ===
Pope Pius XII appointed him as the Titular Bishop of Bilta on February 3, 1940. He was consecrated a bishop by Cardinal Dennis Dougherty, Archbishop of Philadelphia, on April 2, 1940. The principal co-consecrators were Archbishops Michael Curley of Baltimore-Washington and Edward Mooney of Detroit. He died suddenly on June 9, 1942, at the age of 63.

Academic offices
Preceded by James Hugh Ryan	Rector of the Catholic University of America; 1936–1942	Succeeded by Patrick J. McCormick
Catholic Church titles
Preceded by –	— TITULAR — Titular Bishop of Bilta; 1940–1942	Succeeded by –
