= WCUA (Catholic University of America) =

Radio station at The Catholic University of America

WCUA is the college radio station broadcast from The Catholic University of America. Due to a lack of an FCC broadcast license, the station currently only broadcasts over the internet at their website.

Much of the programming consists of talk and rock/jazz/country music. Breaks between and during shows are done through a preset playlist by either the station producer or the station manager.

== History ==
=== 1920–1958: WQAW and WGIB ===
As a university with an electrical engineering school, students expressed interest in varied aspects of radio broadcasting. In 1921, the Electrical Engineering Department successfully built a working radio transmitter. In December, 1922, a CUA Tower article reports,

"Installation of the radio experimental station in the Engineering Building has been completed and is now in operation. The call for this station is 3-X-I."

Based on these successes, the university applied for and received a broadcast license on February 23, 1923. Called WQAW, the station broadcast at 834 kHz (AM) at five watts power on "unlimited time."

"Broadcast was begun immediately, the programs consisting of phonograph records, occasional "live" talent, talks and discussions. Considerable interest was shown in the station. However, with the growth of commercial broadcasting, the University authorities felt that station WQAW was "hopelessly outclassed."... Consequently, when the station license expired, August 23, 1923, - a license which had placed the station on 1,270 kHz and permitted it to use 50 watts power - no application for renewal was made and the station was deleted by the federal government on June 11, 1924."

In the 1930s, CUA's Columbus School of Law offered lectures on communications law and the Federal Radio Commission (later the Federal Communications Commission.)

During the Spring semester of 1948, students Al Wolcek and Howie Benson, who had both served in the Navy as radio technicians, broadcast on what would today be referred to as a "micro" station at 880 AM. Benson recalled,

"I had built a small one tube transmitter to use as a wireless connection to my record turntable to my radio. This also allowed others near us to listen to my records. It turned out that it radiated further than I expected..."

This transmitter only had enough power to reach fellow students of Gibbons Hall, so they dubbed it WGIB. They had hoped to spark interest in a radio club that would bring about a campus-wide station called WCUA, but did not pursue this with school administrators.

=== 1958–1962: The Beginning - Mullen Library and Albert Hall ===
WCUA was formed in 1958, sponsored by the student council and starting with 75 volunteers. The October, 1958 issue of the 'CUA Bulletin' contains a blurb entitled "Radio Station WCUA to Start"

WCUA, conducted by the students and moderated by Rev. Dr. Raymond Hain, Assistant to the Vice Rector, is to broadcast programs covering University events and activities, religious ceremonies, live and recorded shows, music tapes, and lectures. The station is expected to start operations the end of October. Electrical Engineering majors under George McDuffie, Instructor, will operate the station. Transmitters will be so located as to serve students and faculty in the various residences and groups of buildings of the University community."

Due to delays, the official opening occurred on March 13, 1959. Announcers included actor Jon Voight, (B.A. 1960.) A 1971 Tower article reviews the early years:

WCUA was also plagued by delays before regular broadcasting due to unavailability of parts and difficulties with equipment. It finally began operations five months behind schedule with the blessing of the Rector, dedicating "the voice of the Catholic University of America to the service of Almighty God, and the welfare of our beloved University."

WCUA broadcast from the basement of Mullen Library because, the radio committee said, "There is no building on campus more permanent and solid than the University Library.If the radio station were to be located in this building, it could be on a permanent basis.

By October, 1961, the broadcasting studio was moved to Albert Hall for indefinite reasons. WCUA died in May 1962, for lack of student support and funds to renovate ailing equipment. One of the problems facing WCUA was that of poor transmission equipment making the signal very weak even when the programs were good.

=== 1962–1971: In the Wilderness ===
Attempts to revive the station in 1964 were not successful. In the Fall of 1968, a Broadcast Club formed to work for an FM license. (It does not appear that the University actually applied for a broadcast license, but if it did, it lost out to Pacifica station WPFW.)

=== 1971–1984: Saint John's Hall ===
In April, 1971, An ad hoc student government committee met to discuss creation of a campus radio station. Later that month, initial funding was approved. That October, students began construction on studios in 314 Saint John's Hall. It would share the 3rd floor with The Tower Newspaper and The Cardinal Yearbook. Manager Jim English hoped to open in November, but delays with equipment pushed back the starting date. On February 1, 1972. WWCU commenced broadcasting with "Do You Believe in Magic" by the Lovin' Spoonful.

The studio consisted of a three-room suite. The middle room contained the broadcast booth entered from the hallway, which had a soundproof window and door into the smaller news/production studio by the outside wall. One adjacent room was used for office space and meetings; the other room served as the record library. Later, a separate room across the hall was used for the record library, freeing up a room for meetings and overflow office space. One of the unofficial perks of volunteering for WCUA in this location was access to the sizable roof overlooking the football stadium. "St. John's Beach" proved an ideal location for social gatherings, football related and otherwise.

The station was called WWCU until Fall, 1981, when the station adapted the original WCUA call letters. Station Manager Jeff Duke led a reorganization of the station. For several years, WCUA broadcast consistently for eighteen hours daily with a staff of 60-70.

During the early 1980s, the University administration enacted plans to evacuate St. John's and move student organizations to University Center West (formerly Cardinal Hall.) Offices in UCW were found for The Tower and The Cardinal, but WCUA remained because a suitable space was not yet available. Finally, in the Fall of 1983, five rooms facing the CUA Mall were set aside. Station engineers began framing the new studios and construction work. University administrators determined that such work had to be completed by licensed contractors, so a $10,000 job soon tripled in cost. The station had to leave St. John's, but Could not move into UCW until the completion of construction. Negotiations with the Undergraduate Student Government and the Treasury Board delayed funding, so the station did not broadcast during Fall 1984 or the beginning of the Spring 1985 semester.

=== 1985–2003: University Center West ===
After much struggle and expense over the 1984-85 school year, professional contractors and WCUA volunteers completed construction of the new studios on the 4th floor of University Center West (previously Cardinal Hall.) On April 21, 1985, University President Father William S. Byron, S.J., led the opening ceremonies to the new, six-room studios. Although crafted from multiple rooms, open access was limited to one main door. It opened onto the reception area/offices. Down the hallway were the production studios, broadcast booth, equipment room, and lockable library. Additional shelves for LP records were placed in the hallway.

=== 2004–2012: Pryzbyla Center ===
WCUA remained in UCW until student organizations were relocated to the first floor of the new Edward J. Pryzbyla Center in January 2004. In the Spring of 2005, WCUA returned to the "airwaves" with both state-of-the-art broadcast and recording studios. Initially the station had a broadcast and production studios in two rooms. In later years, the Office of Campus Affairs determined that The Tower newspaper needed more space, so the production room was shared between WCUA and The Tower.

=== Since 2012: Ward Hall ===
During the Summer of 2012 the university moved the offices of several student groups including WCUA. The station was relocated from the Pryzbala Center to Ward Hall, home of the Benjamin T. Rome School of Music. The new broadcast facility is located in the Music Department's former recording studio, a windowless room unused for several years. The station consists of a single room, reportedly possessing more square footage than the previous studio. WCUA will work with the departments of Music and Information Technology to set up equipment, including a new web server, and recommence webcasting Autumn 2012.

According to a February 2016 Tower article, the station was closed by the university for "faulty licensing" (not explained in article) during the Fall 2015 semester. Station Manager Joseph D'Antonio, Assistant Station Manager Christopher Neyhart and other volunteers brought back music and talk shows. A February 24, 2016 profile of a visit to the cluttered Ward music studio at the Radio Survivor website provides a look around the station and an interview with Manager Joseph D'Antonio.

== Broadcasting Methods ==
Beginning in March, 1959, The station initially broadcast to the CUA campus via AM carrier current transmitters. Although eventually replaced by FM modulators, some dormitories were still served by AM as late as the 1980s.

During the 1970s, the university had hopes of a campus-wide closed-circuit television service to dormitories and other buildings. Although the TV service was not developed, the coaxial cable buried between buildings allowed the radio station to use the TV cabling to distribute an FM signal. The signal originated from a modulator located at the studios in St. John's Hall and was carried by coaxial cable to amplifiers installed in each dormitory. The amplifiers boosted the signal, then sent it through coaxial cables previously installed inside the buildings.

While the FM signal had clearer sound than AM, there were service interruptions when construction on campus caused damage or breaks to the cabling. As cable repair was not a top priority of the university administration, WWCU and WCUA staff and supporters held "digging parties" to locate and repair breaks in the cable. Over time, with portions of the underground coaxial cables irreparable and new dormitory buildings being constructed, the station purchased additional frequency-agile FM modulators set to the same broadcast frequency. These modulators were installed in buildings across campus and fed audio signals distributed from the studio using existing "dry pair" telephone cables installed across campus. In order to further improve audio quality, compressors and expanders were installed in the audio signal chain.

During certain periods of the 1990s, WCUA was available on campus via cable television. In 2000, the station began streaming its signal on the World Wide Web.

== Current status ==
WCUA maintains a university website at https://nest.cua.edu/organization/wcua and a webcast location at http://wcua.caster.fm which incorporates a live webcast from September through April. The station is equipped with automation equipment that provides an unannounced music feed when DJs are not available.

Until the advent of the internet and web broadcasting, WCUA had always been an exclusively on-campus broadcast service. Except for the license held by WQAW from 1923–24, the University has never held an FCC broadcast license, and the opportunity to do so in one of the most crowded and expensive radio markets in the United States poses considerable challenges. Nonetheless, the station currently seeks Alumni sponsorship to obtain a licensed radio station with paid internships and staff for the radio station of the Catholic University of America.
