= Benjamin T. Rome School of Music, Drama, and Art =

Arts school at the Catholic University of America

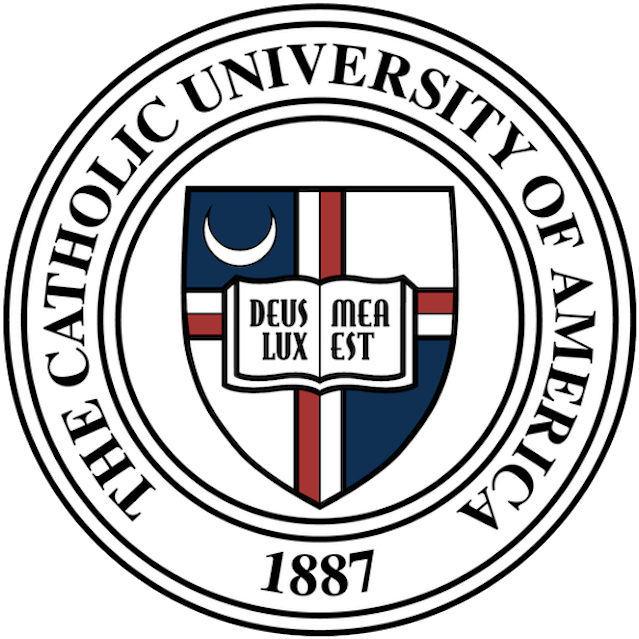
- Established: 1965/2018
- Parent institution: Catholic University of America
- Affiliations: Catholic
- Dean: Dr. Jacqueline Leary-Warsaw
- Students: 300
- Undergraduates: 160
- Postgraduates: 140
- Location: Washington D.C., U.S. 38.935123°N 77.001636°W
- Website: music.catholic.edu

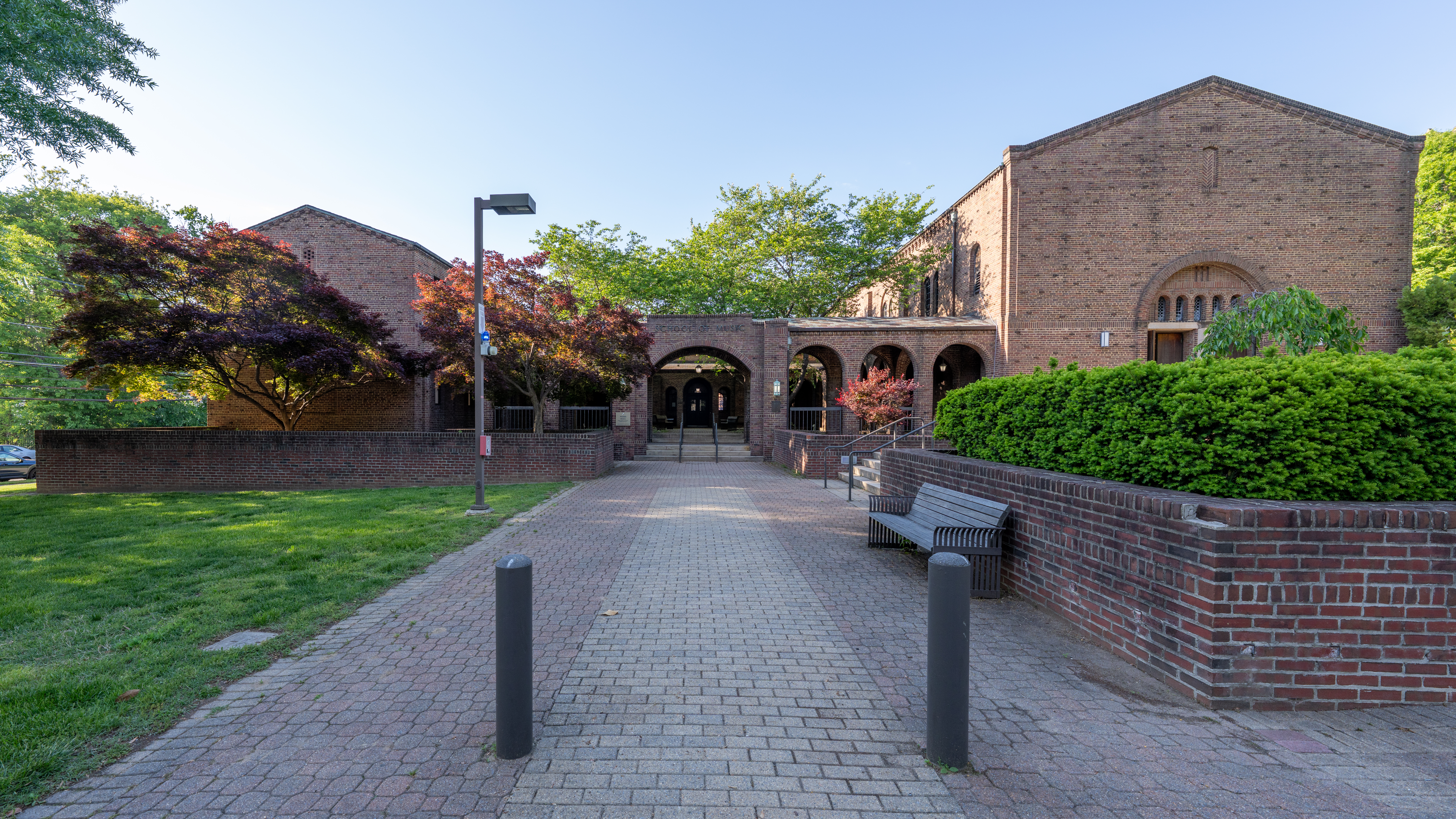
Ward Hall (2026)

The Benjamin T. Rome School of Music, Drama, and Art is the school of arts with the School of Music, Department of Drama, and Department of Art of The Catholic University of America, located in Washington D.C.

The school is fully accredited by the National Association of Schools of Music.

== History ==
The Catholic University of America first began offering music courses in 1927. In 1950 a music department was established and in 1965 the department became the School of Music. The school was named the Benjamin T. Rome School of Music in the spring of 1984, in honor of alumnus, Trustee Emeritus, and benefactor, Benjamin T. Rome. In 2018, the school's name changed to Benjamin T. Rome School of Music, Drama, and Art.

On January 30, 2025, University President Peter Kilpatrick announced plans to merge the music and drama departments of the Rome School into a newly-created College of Arts and Sciences, and the art department into an expanded School of Architecture and Planning.

== Notable faculty ==
- Murry Sidlin
- Sharon Christman
