= Patrick Joseph McCormick =

His Excellency, The Most Reverend Patrick Joseph McCormick
- Auxiliary Bishop of Washington; Titular Bishop of Atenia
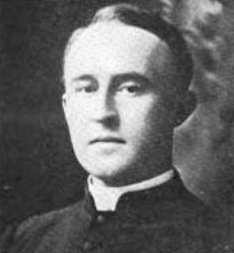
- Church: Roman Catholic Church
- See: Archdiocese of Washington
- Other post: Titular Bishop of Atenia (1950 to 1953)
- Previous post: Rector of Catholic University of America (1943 to 1950)

Orders
- Ordination: July 26, 1904 by Michael Tierney
- Consecration: September 21, 1950 by Amleto Giovanni Cicognani

Personal details
- Born: December 10, 1880 Norwich, Connecticut, US
- Died: May 18, 1953 (aged 72) Washington, D.C., US
- Education: Catholic University of America

Patrick Joseph McCormick (December 10, 1880 – May 18, 1953) was an American prelate of the Roman Catholic Church who served as an auxiliary bishop of the Archdiocese of Washington in the District of Columbia from 1950 to 1953. He previously served as rector of Catholic University of America in Washington.

== Early life ==
Joseph McCormick was born on December 10, 1880, in Norwich, Connecticut to Daniel J. McCormick and Margaret E. McCormick. He attended the parochial school of St. Patrick's Parish in Norwich along with public schools in that city. After deciding to become a priest, McCormick in 1899 entered St. Joseph's Seminary in Yonkers, New York.

=== Priesthood ===
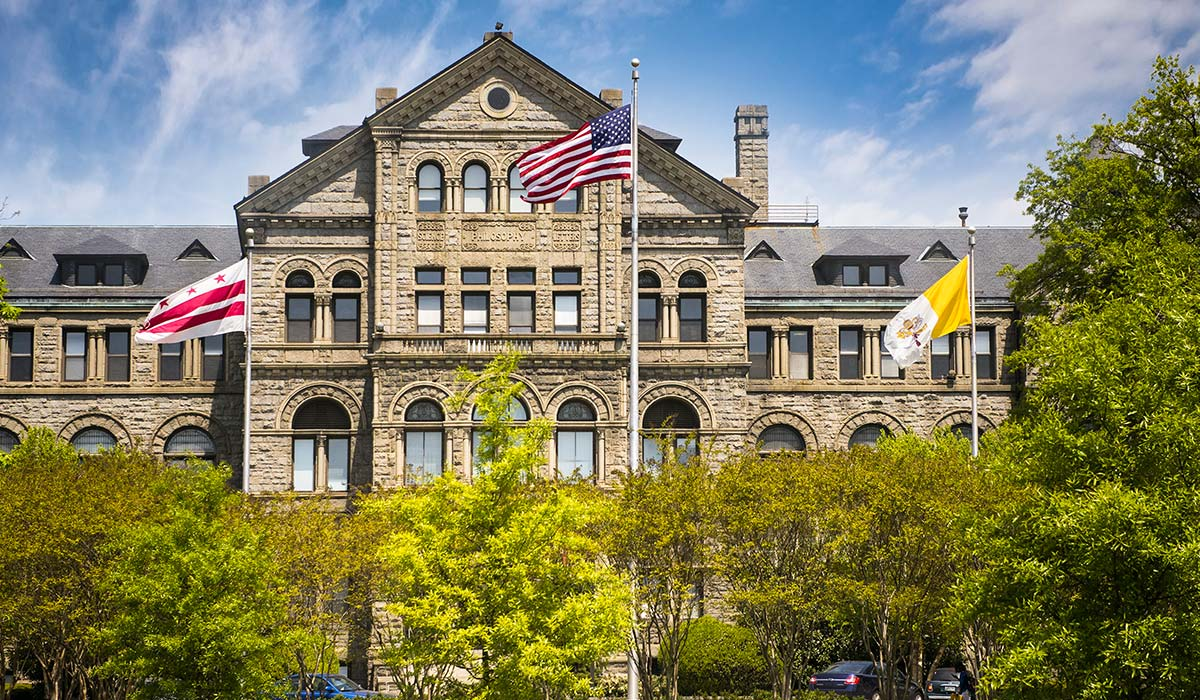
Catholic University of America, Washington, D.C. (2019)

McCormick was ordained a priest on July 26, 1904, for the Archdiocese of Hartford by Bishop Michael Tierney. He entered the Catholic University of America (CUA) in Washington, D.C. in 1905. McCormick received a Bachelor of Sacred Theology degree in 1905 and a Licentiate in Sacred Theology in 1906.

McCormick returned to Connecticut in 1906 to become superintendent of schools for the Archdiocese of Hartford. In 1911, he returned to CUA to join the education department as an instructor. He received a Doctor of Philosophy degree from CUA in 1911

McCormick later became the department head and the dean of the Catholic Sisters College at CUA.In 1929, the Vatican elevated McCormick to the rank of domestic prelate. He was named vice rector of CUA in 1936. McCormick was appointed rector of CUA by Pope Pius XII in 1943, becoming the first alumnus to hold that title.

McCormick was an editor and contributor from 1921 to 1944 of the Catholic Educational Review. He also served as president of the Catholic Educational Press. He was also an important contributor to the Cyclopedia of Education and The Encyclopedia of Sunday Schools

=== Auxiliary Bishop of Washington ===
Pius XII named McCormick on June 14, 1950, as an auxiliary bishop of Washington and titular bishop of Atenia. He was consecrated by Cardinal Amleto Giovanni Cicognani on September 21, 1950, at the National Shrine of the Immaculate Conception in Washington.

=== Death ===
McCormick died in Washington on May 18, 1953. He was buried at Mount Olivet Cemetery in that city.

Academic offices
Preceded by Joseph M. Corrigan	Rector of CUA; 1943–1953	Succeeded by Bryan J. McEntegart
