= Peter Kilpatrick =

American academic

Peter K. Kilpatrick

16th President of the Catholic University of America
- Incumbent
- Assumed office July 1, 2022
- Preceded by: John H. Garvey

Personal details
- Born: April 30, 1956 (age 70) Montgomery, Alabama, U.S.
- Education: Occidental College (BA); University of Minnesota (PhD)
- Profession: University administrator, chemical engineer

Peter K. Kilpatrick is an American chemical engineer and academic administrator currently serving as the 16th president of the Catholic University of America since July 2022. He previously served as provost of the Illinois Institute of Technology in Chicago from 2018 to 2022 and as dean of the Notre Dame College of Engineering from 2008 to 2018.

== Early life and education ==
Kilpatrick was born at Maxwell Air Force Base in Montgomery, Alabama. His father was a founding member of the United States Air Force and so his family moved often including to Guam and Turkey. He was not raised Catholic but, at the age of 10, experienced a personal Great Awakening and asked his parents to purchase him a 10 volume set of books known as the Bible Series. A childhood friend was the son of a Methodist minister, and the minister baptized Kilpatrick that year. He later fell away from the faith.

Kilpatrick attended Occidental College in Los Angeles, California, for undergraduate studies. He received a Bachelor of Arts with a major in chemistry from Occidental College in 1978 and a Ph.D. in chemical engineering from the University of Minnesota in 1983.

== Career ==
He began his teaching career at North Carolina State University in 1983. He rose from an assistant to associate and then full professor of chemical engineering. He served as the associate head of the department from 1996 to 1999 and then head of the chemical and biomolecular engineering department from 1999 to 2007. During the years of 2004 to 2007, Kilpatrick was the founding director of the Biomanufacturing Training and Education Center.

From 2008 to 2018, Kilpatrick served as the dean of the Notre Dame College of Engineering at the University of Notre Dame. While there, he launched a joint Doctor of Philosophy program with the private Pontifical Catholic University of Chile. He also built a chapel in the engineering building where masses were celebrated, in part to build a community of believers in the engineering program. During this time Kilpatrick also started a lecture series on the intersection of faith and science and helped sponsor many trips of 1,000 people to the March for Life in Washington, D.C. During this time, enrollment in the engineering school grew by 60%.

Kilpatrick then moved to the Illinois Institute of Technology in Chicago, where he was the provost and vice president for academic affairs from 2018 to 2022. During this time, he developed an online master's program geared towards students in China. The program is expected to bring in $10 million in net tuition revenue by 2025. He also hired four new deans and seven department chairs. He was planning to retire and return to North Carolina, but received a phone call from a friend asking him to consider applying for the president's position at The Catholic University of America. He originally refused the proposal, citing his plans to retire to the home in Cary, North Carolina he built in 2018 and to earn a Doctor of Philosophy in theology.

As a chemical engineer, Kilpatrick owns or co-owns 12 patents. He has published more than 100 journal articles.

== Personal life ==
=== Family life ===
During their freshman year in Occidental College, he met his future wife, Nancy. They were assigned to the same chemistry research project during the summer after their junior year and were engaged by the end of the summer. Nancy was Catholic and, while preparing to marry, the couple met with a priest. After Kilpatrick originally demurred, saying he wanted his children to make up their own minds, the priest persuaded him to agree to raise any future children in the Catholic faith "under a little duress."

The Kilpatricks have four children, Elisabeth, Zachary, Charlie, and Alexandra, and three grandchildren, Lucy, Oliver, and Anna. When their first child, Elisabeth, was born, they visited their local parish in Minneapolis to have her baptized and Kilpatrick began attending mass. He was so moved by the priest's pro-life homily that he "almost immediately converted." He went through the Rite of Christian Initiation for Adults (RCIA) and has been a practicing Catholic ever since. He later taught RCIA and Family Intergenerational Religious Education (FIRE) classes at St. Michael the Archangel Parish in Cary, North Carolina, his home parish. The Kilpatricks are still parishioners there, even though they don’t currently live in Cary.

=== Political views ===
Kilpatrick describes himself as "apolitical." He is pro-immigration and describes climate change as "very, very serious." He is also strongly pro-life.

== Awards ==
Kilpatrick won the American Society for Engineering Education Regional Teaching Award and a pro-life award from Notre Dame, among others. He holds an honorary doctorate from the Pazmany Peter Catholic University of Budapest, Hungary.
