= School of Theology and Religious Studies =

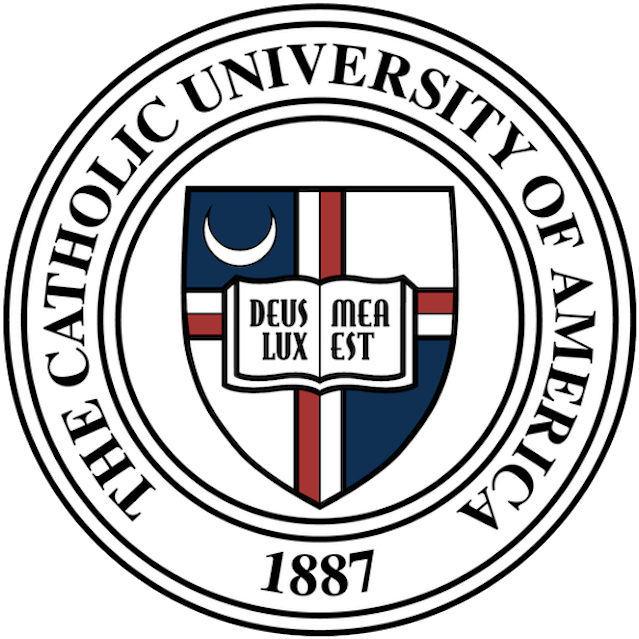
- Established: 1887; 139 years ago
- Parent institution: The Catholic University of America
- Affiliation: Roman Catholic
- Dean: Very Rev. Mark Morozowich
- Academic staff: 43
- Administrative staff: 10
- Location: Washington, D.C., U.S. 38°55′52.7″N 76°59′54.4″W
- Website: trs.cua.edu

The School of Theology and Religious Studies is one of the twelve schools at The Catholic University of America in Washington, D.C., and one of the three ecclesiastical schools at the university, together with the School of Canon Law and the School of Philosophy. The school is part of the main campus in the Brookland neighborhood in Northeast Washington, D.C.

== Programs of study ==
=== Undergraduate programs ===
- Bachelor of Arts in Theology & Religious Studies
- BA/MA Combination Degree Program in Theology & Religious Studies
- Minor in Theology & Religious Studies
- Certificate in Pastoral Ministry

=== Graduate programs ===
The School of Theology and Religious Studies offers either Civil, Ecclesiastical, or Pastoral degrees:

- Civil
  - M.A.
  - Ph.D.
- Ecclesiastical
  - S.T.B.
  - S.T.L.
  - S.T.D.
- Pastoral
  - M.Div.
  - M.R.E.
  - D.Min.
