= Catholic University of America =

Private university in Washington, D.C., US

The Catholic University of America
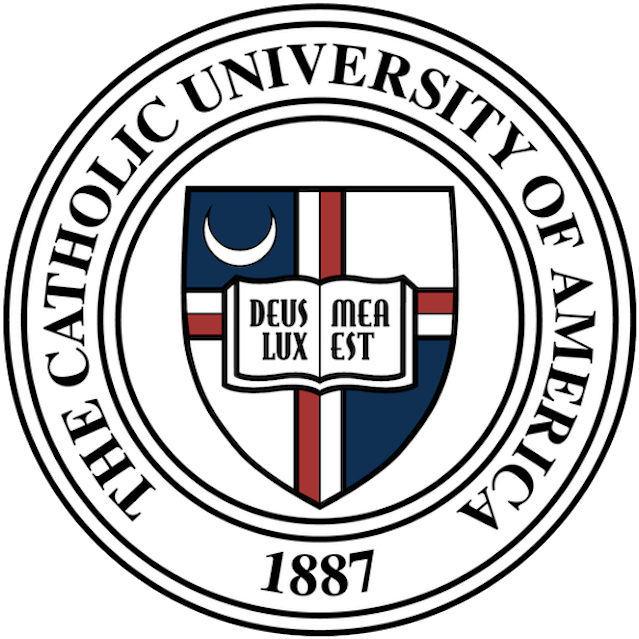
- Motto: Deus Lux Mea Est (Latin)
- Motto in English: "God Is My Light"
- Type: Private research university
- Established: April 10, 1887; 139 years ago
- Accreditation: MSCHE
- Religious affiliation: Catholic Church
- Academic affiliations: ACCU; ORAU; CUWMA
- Endowment: $390.9 million (2025)
- Chancellor: Robert W. McElroy
- President: Peter Kilpatrick
- Provost: Aaron Dominguez
- Faculty: 455 full-time and 328 part-time (spring 2022)
- Students: 5,366 (Spring 2022)
- Undergraduates: 3,055
- Postgraduates: 2,311
- Location: Washington, D.C., United States; 38°56′01″N 76°59′55″W
- Campus: Urban, 176 acres (71 ha)
- Newspaper: The Tower
- Colors: Gold and white (academic) Red and black (athletics)
- Nickname: Cardinals
- Sporting affiliations: NCAA Division III – Landmark Conference; NEWMAC; MARC
- Mascot: Cardinal
- Website: catholic.edu
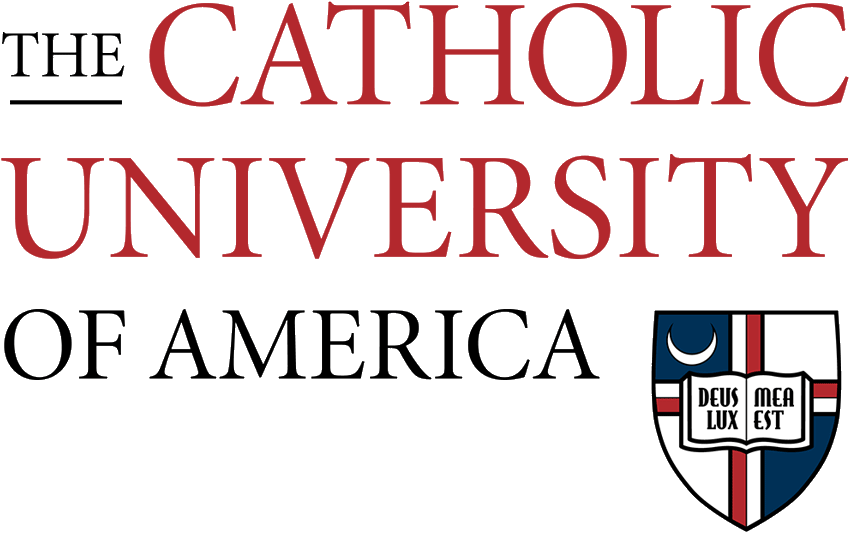

The Catholic University of America (CUA) is a private Catholic research university in Washington, D.C., United States. It is one of two pontifical universities of the Catholic Church in the United States – the only one that is not primarily a seminary – and the only institution of higher education founded by the United States Conference of Catholic Bishops. Established in 1887 as a graduate and research center following approval by Pope Leo XIII, the university began offering undergraduate education in 1904. In the Carnegie Classification of Institutions of Higher Education, it is classified as an R1 university.

Its campus is adjacent to the Brookland neighborhood, known as "Little Rome," which contains 60 Catholic institutions, including Trinity Washington University, the Dominican House of Studies, Archbishop Carroll High School, and the Basilica of the National Shrine of the Immaculate Conception.

CUA's programs emphasize the liberal arts, professional education, and personal development. The school stays closely connected with the Catholic Church and Catholic organizations. The residential U.S. cardinals put on the American Cardinals Dinner each year to raise scholarship funds. The university also has a long history of working with the Knights of Columbus; its law school has dedications to the involvement and support of the Knights.

== History ==
=== Founding ===
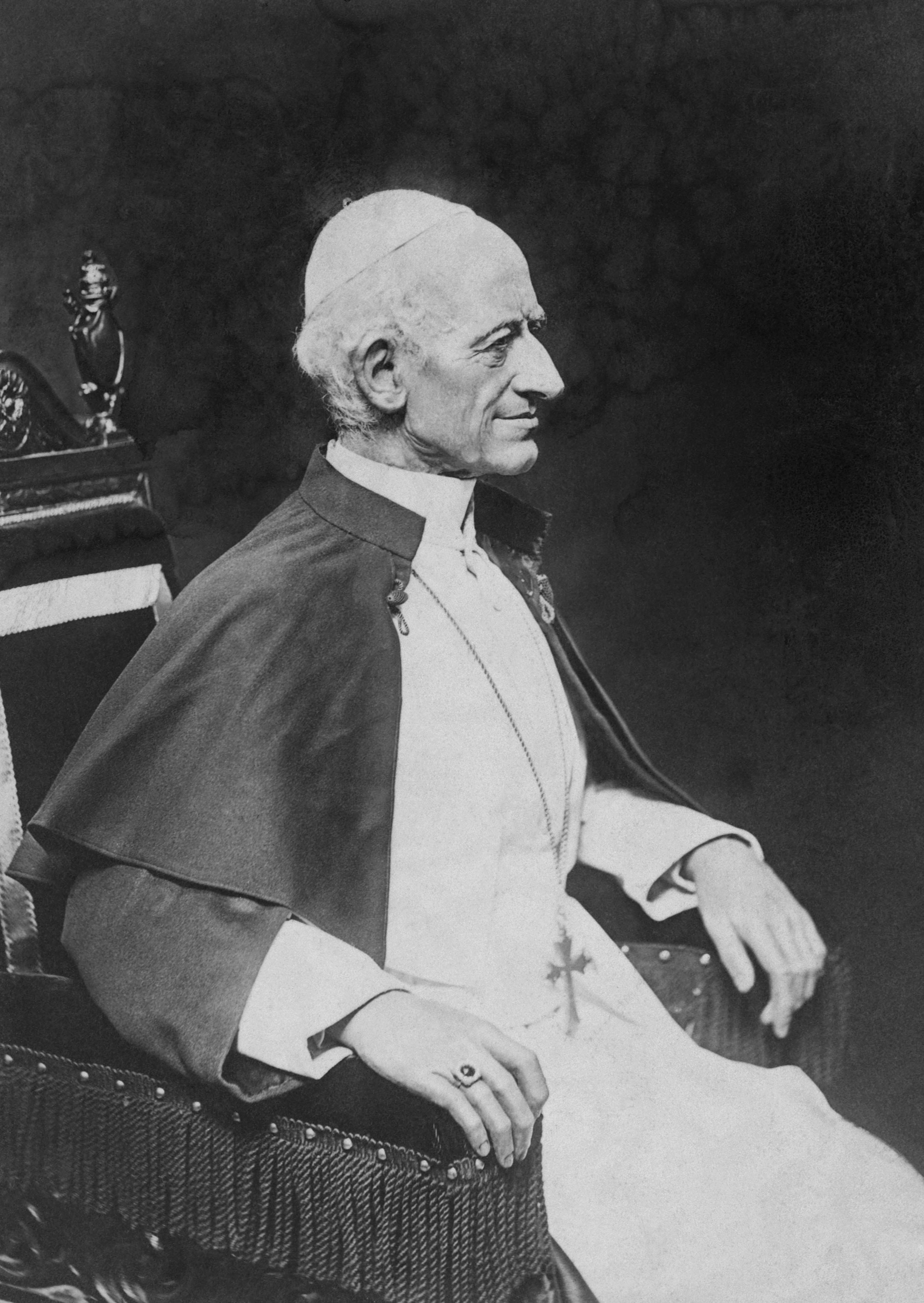
Pope Leo XIII, who granted Catholic University of America its charter in April 1886

At the Second Plenary Council of Baltimore in 1866, the United States Conference of Catholic Bishops first discussed the need for a national Catholic university. At the Third Plenary Council on January 26, 1885, bishops chose the name The Catholic University of America for the institution.

In 1882, Bishop John Lancaster Spalding went to Rome to obtain Pope Leo XIII's support for the university, also persuading his family friend Mary Gwendoline Caldwell to pledge $300,000 to establish it. On April 10, 1887, Pope Leo XIII sent James Cardinal Gibbons a letter granting permission to establish the university. On March 7, 1889, the Pope issued the encyclical Magni Nobis, granting the university its charter and establishing its mission as the instruction of Catholicism and human nature together at the graduate level. By developing new leaders and new knowledge, the university was intended to strengthen and enrich Catholicism in the United States.

The university was incorporated in 1887 on 66 acres (27 ha) of land next to the Old Soldiers Home. President Grover Cleveland was in attendance for the laying of the cornerstone of Divinity Hall, now known as Caldwell Hall, on May 24, 1888, as were members of Congress and the U.S. Cabinet.

=== 19th century ===
When the university first opened on November 13, 1889, the curriculum consisted of lectures in mental and moral philosophy, English literature, the sacred scriptures, and the various branches of theology. At the end of the second term, lectures on canon law were added. The first students were graduated in 1889. By 1900, CUA was one of the 14 colleges that offered doctorate programs which formed the Association of American Universities.

=== 20th century ===
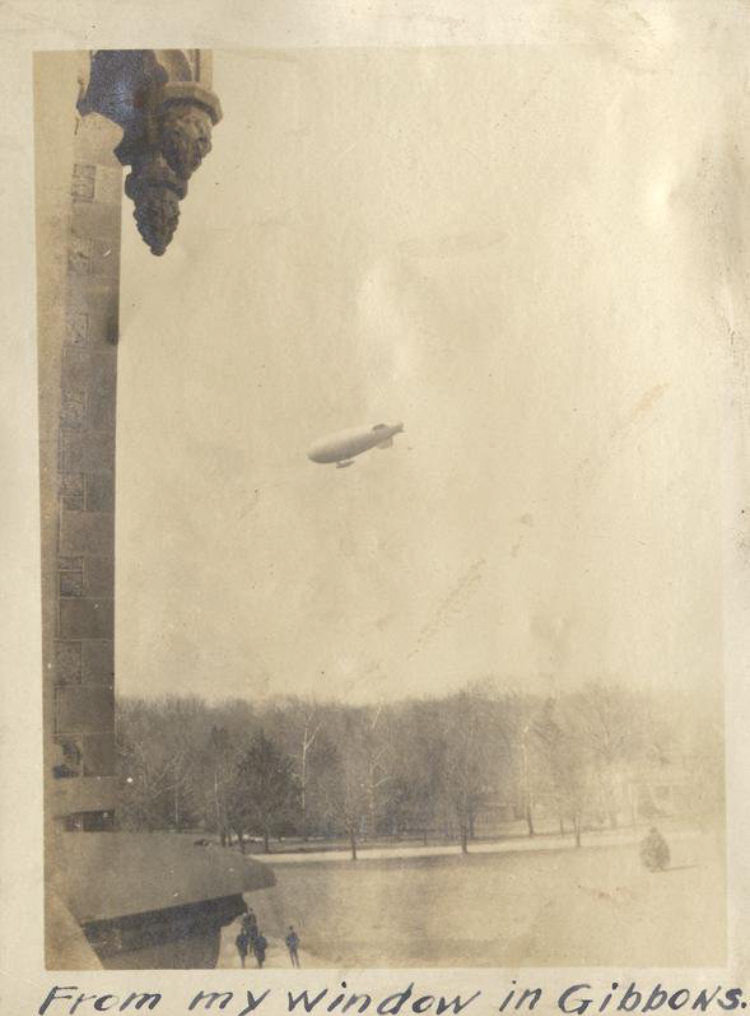
A blimp over Gibbons Hall during the 1917–18 school year

In 1904, the university added an undergraduate program. The president of the first undergraduate class was Frank Kuntz, whose memoir of that period was published by The Catholic University of America Press. The university gives an annual award named for Kuntz.

Bishop and Rector Thomas J. Shahan gave a speech to the Ancient Order of Hibernians in 1894 in which he advocated for Irish independence in language, culture, and politics. This resulted in the Hibernians endowing a chair of Gaelic Languages and Literature at the university. Only Harvard University had a similar position at the time, and this attracted the attention of William Butler Yeats. During a trip to the United States, Yeats spoke to students in McMahon Hall on February 21, 1904. In a follow-up letter to Shahan, he said: "you have surely a great university and I wish we had its like in Ireland."

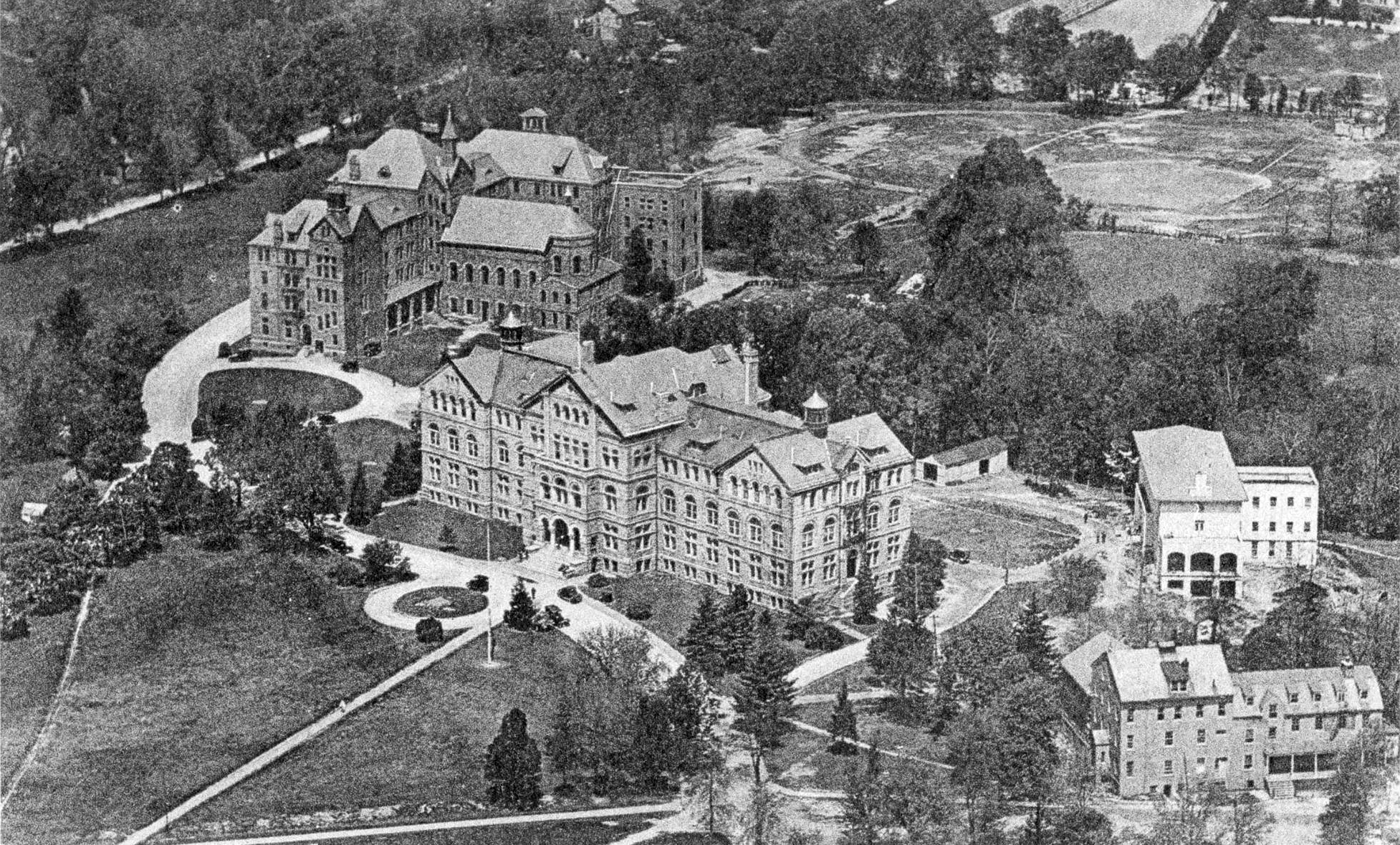
An aerial view of the university's campus in 1920

Despite Washington, D.C., being a Southern and segregated city when the university was founded, it admitted black Catholic men as students. At the time, the only other college in the District to do so was Howard University, founded for African-American education after the Civil War. In 1895, Catholic University had three black students, all from DC. "They were simply tested as to their previous education, and this being found satisfactory, no notice whatever was taken of their color. They stand on exactly the same footing as other students of equal intellectual calibre and acquirements", according to Keane. Conaty, speaking to President William McKinley during a visit on June 1, 1900, said that the university, "like the Catholic Church ... knows no race line and no color line." However in 1914 the school ended this policy and commenced denying admission to Black students, with CUA kowtowing to the segregationist policies that swept through the nation's capital following the election of Woodrow Wilson.

In 1935, the university's coat of arms was designed by Pierre de Chaignon la Rose.

A victory parade for the 1936 Orange Bowl champions went up Pennsylvania Avenue on its circular route from Union Station to campus. President Franklin D. Roosevelt, "on his way to church, became an unwitting parader, when the march de triumph jammed traffic in front of the White House."

In 1938, due to the rise of the antisemitic priest Charles Coughlin and not long after Kristallnacht, CUA officials asked CBS and NBC to broadcast an event live from the university campus. The broadcast had little effect, participating clerics did not mention Coughlin, and barely mentioned Nazi conduct by name, while offering general support for Jews.

The university began admitting Black students again in 1936, following protests from Thomas Wyatt Turner, the Federated Colored Catholics and NAACP (both of which Turner co-founded), and the Catholic Interracial Council. Forty Black students were enrolled by 1939 with most in the School of Arts and Sciences. However, Black students continued to experience discrimination at the university with segregation practiced in many parts of the campus until the mid-1940s.

The presence of CUA attracted other Catholic institutions to the area, including colleges, religious orders, and national service organizations. Between 1900 and 1940, more than 50 international Catholic institutions rented or owned property in neighboring Brookland. Following World War II, Catholic University had a dramatic expansion in enrollment, thanks to veterans making use of the G.I. Bill to complete college educations.

=== Law school ===
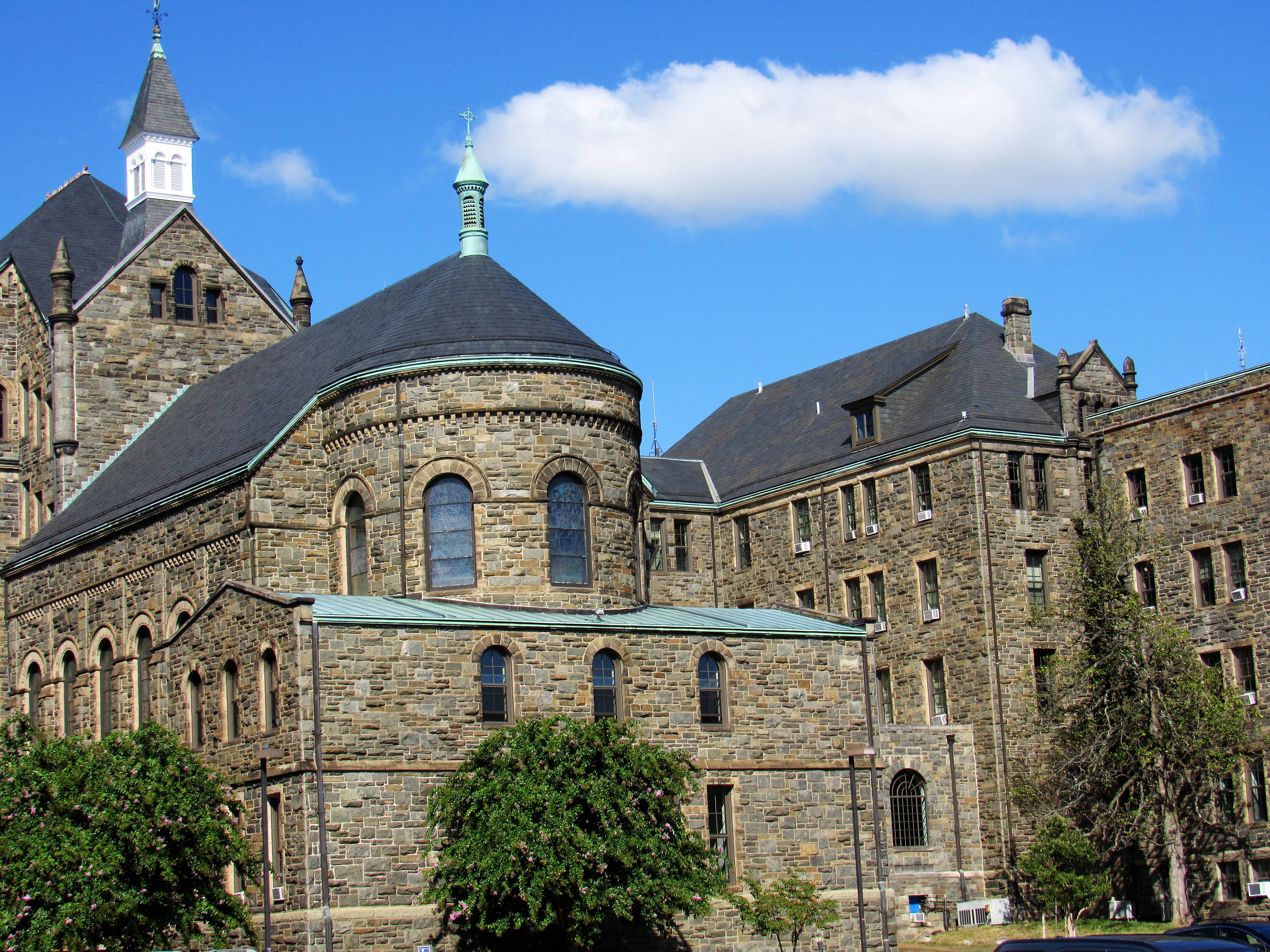
Caldwell Hall in August 2019

In 1954, Columbus University merged with the law program of CUA to become the Columbus School of Law at Catholic University of America, after the American Bar Association in 1951 challenged law schools not affiliated with a university. The CUA law school was the first professional school of the university.

=== 21st century ===
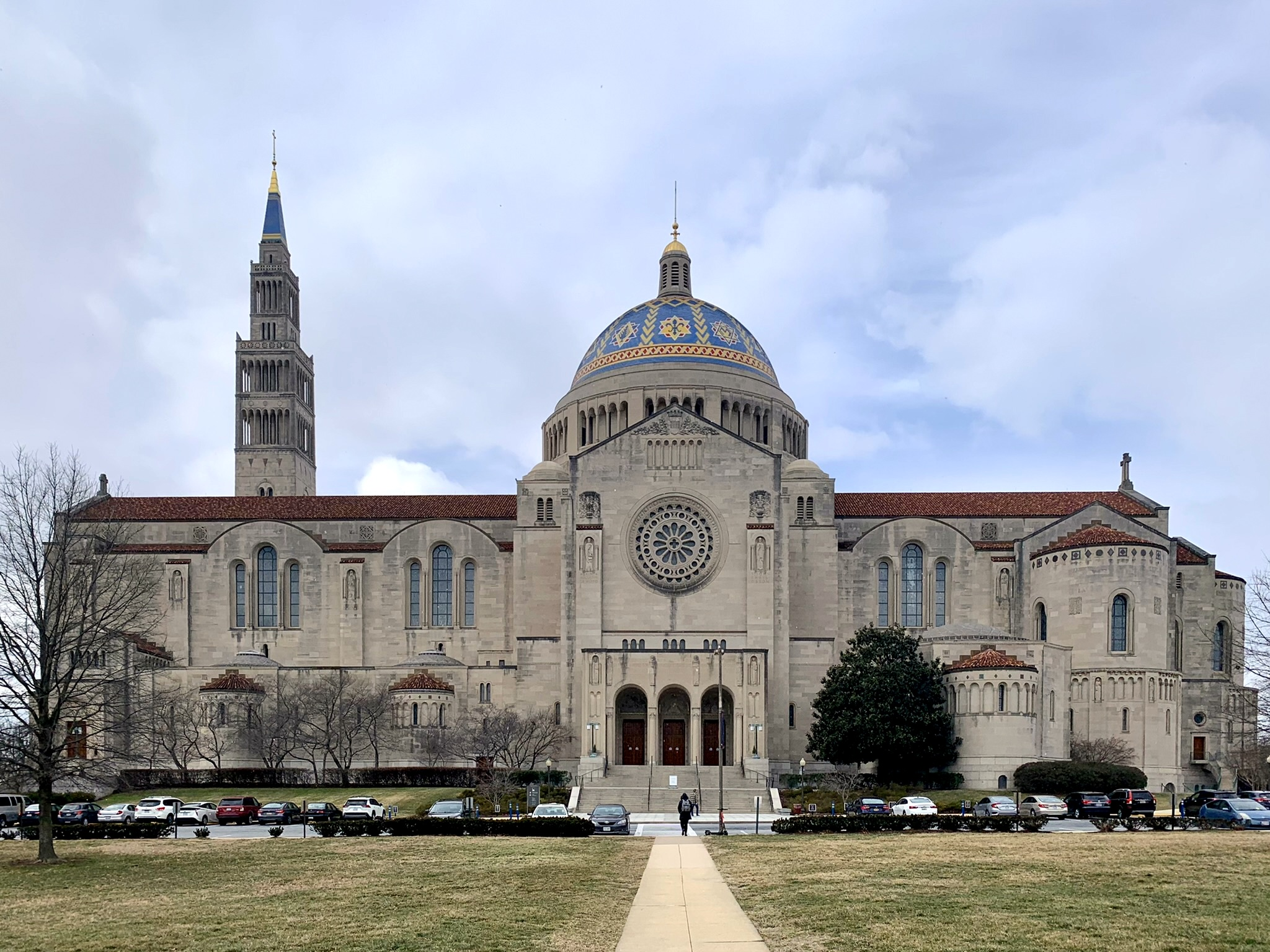
The Basilica of the National Shrine of the Immaculate Conception at the center of the university's campus, in February 2022

By the early 21st century, the university had over 6,000 students from all 50 states and around the world. In 2018, the university experienced some challenges as administrators worked to reduce a $3.5 million deficit. Some faculty objected to the draft plan and voted "no confidence" in the president and provost.

On September 22, 2021, it was announced that John Garvey would be stepping down as President of Catholic University on June 30, 2022.

== Knights of Columbus ==
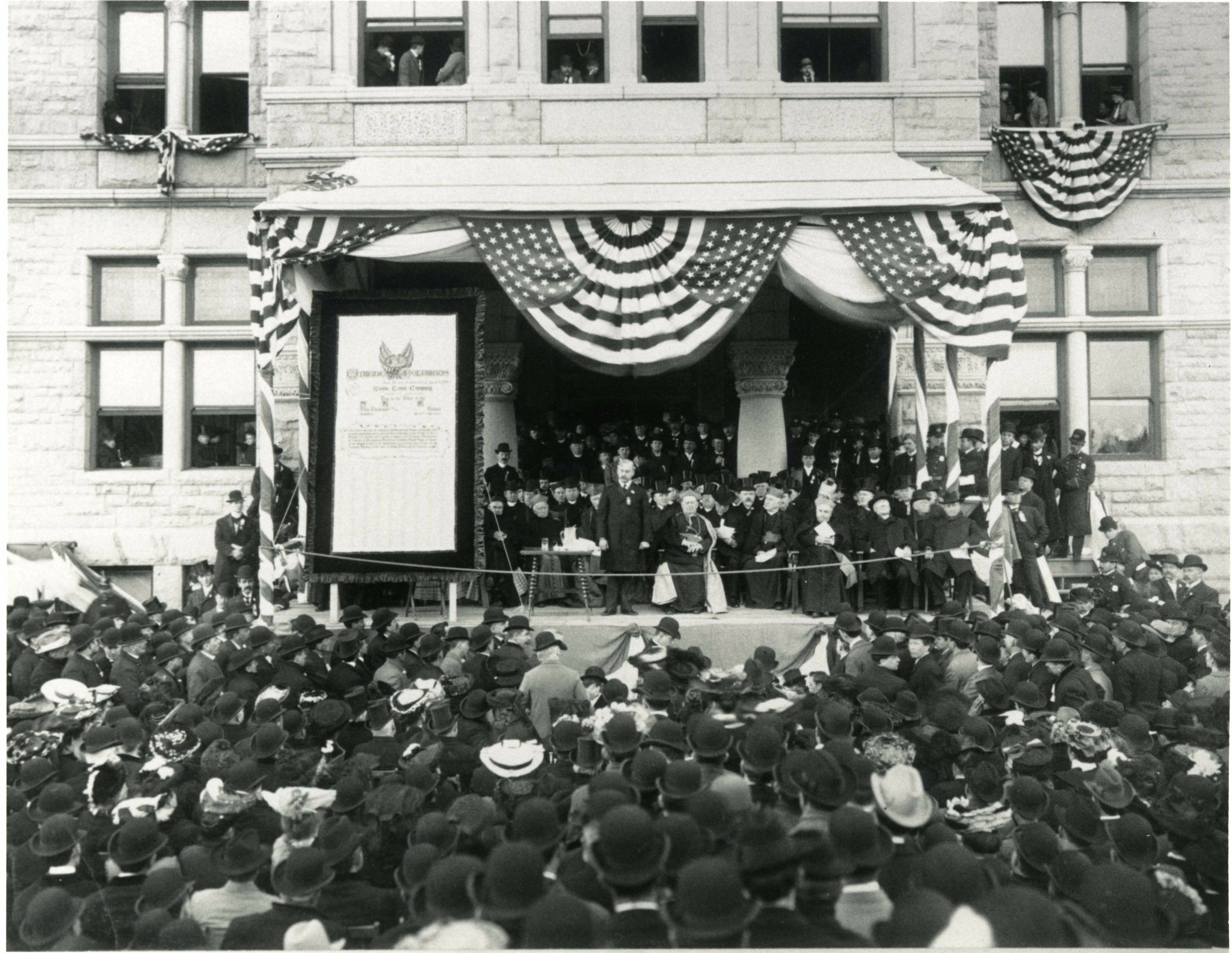
In 1904, Knights of Columbus gave the university a check for over $55,000, which it used to establish its Chair of American History

The Knights of Columbus and Catholic University of America have a history of "a close and supportive relationship" that dates almost to the founding of the university.

In 1899, the National Council of the Knights of Columbus established a Knights of Columbus Chair of American History at the university. More than 10,000 Knights were on hand on April 13, 1904, to present a $55,633.79 check (equivalent to $1,993,544 in 2025) to endow the chair.

In December 1904, Cardinal Gibbons appealed to the Knights for more financial aid to help meet operating costs after some investments went sour. The Order gave nearly $25,000. By 1907 the financial situation of Catholic University had improved but was still shaky. Every Knight was asked to contribute $1 a year for a five-year period, and in December 1913, a $500,000 endowment was established.

In 1920, the order contributed $60,000 toward the Catholic University gymnasium and drill hall, which later was adapted for use as the Crough Building housing the School of Architecture. In 2006, the Knights announced an $8,000,000 gift to the university to renovate Keane Hall and rename it as McGivney Hall, after the Knights' founder, Michael J. McGivney. The building, which was vacant, now houses the Washington session of the Pontifical John Paul II Institute for Studies on Marriage and Family, funded by the Knights and established at the Dominican House of Studies adjacent to the CUA campus in 1988.

In August 1965, a $1 million fund was established to underwrite the Pro Deo and Pro Patria Scholarship, providing twelve undergraduate scholarships annually to the university. In 1989 the Knights voted a $2,000,000 birthday gift to the U.S. bishops on their bicentennial, to be given to Catholic University and used to fund special projects jointly chosen by the university and the Knights. Part of it was used to build the Columbus School of Law.

== Papal visits ==
CUA is the only American university to have been visited by three popes and is one of only two universities to have any visits by a pontiff. Pope John Paul II visited on October 7, 1979. On April 16, 2008, Pope Benedict XVI gave an address at the campus about Catholic education and academic freedom. Pope Francis visited on September 23, 2015, during his trip to the United States, where he celebrated Mass on the east portico of the Basilica of the National Shrine of the Immaculate Conception.

== Campus ==
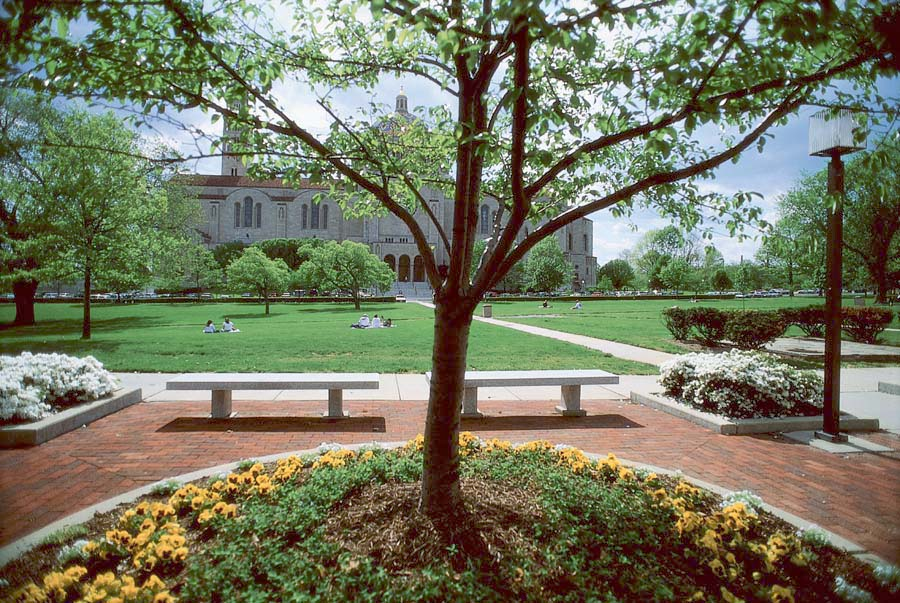
Pryzbyla Plaza, with the National Shrine in the background in May 2006

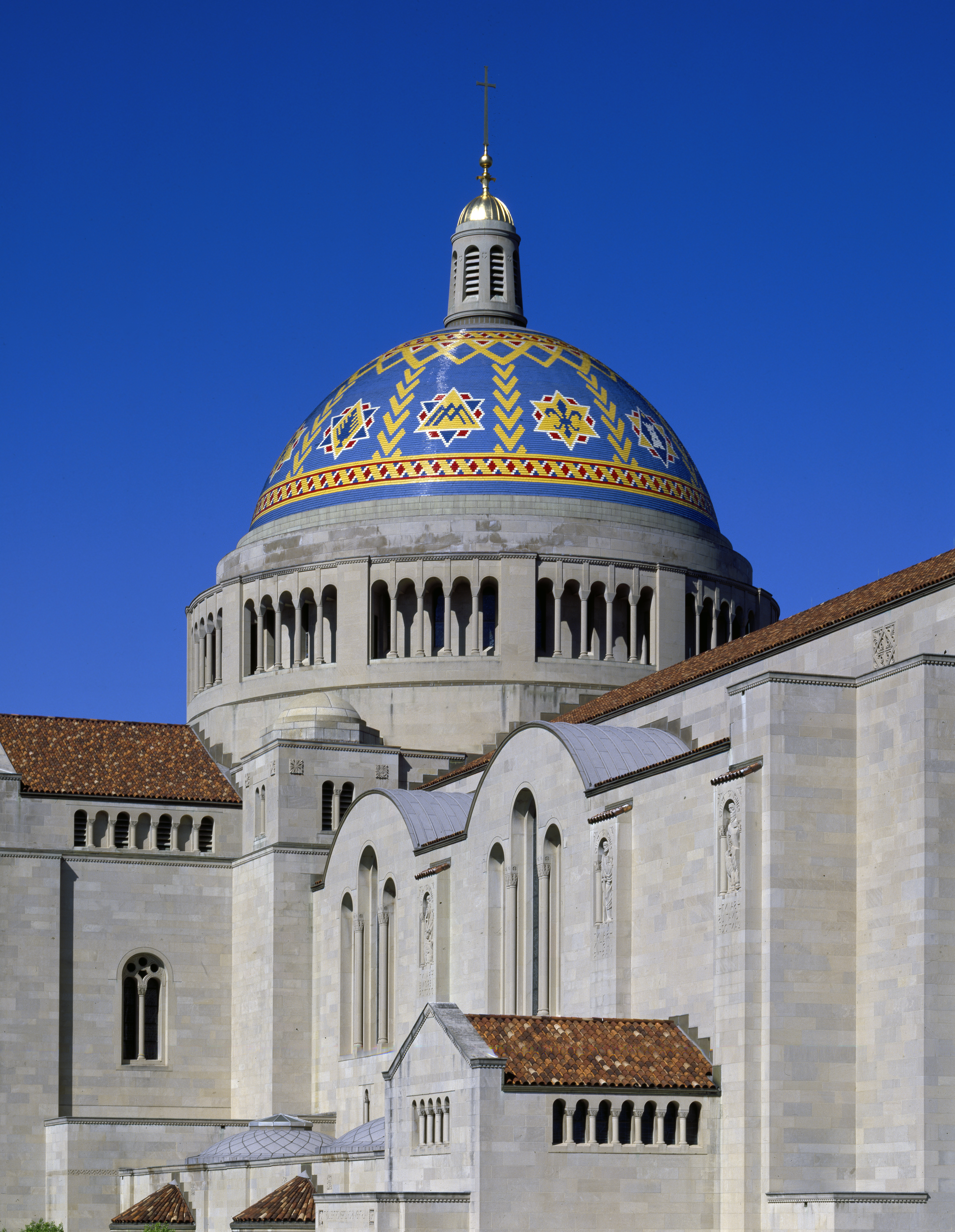
The dome of the Basilica

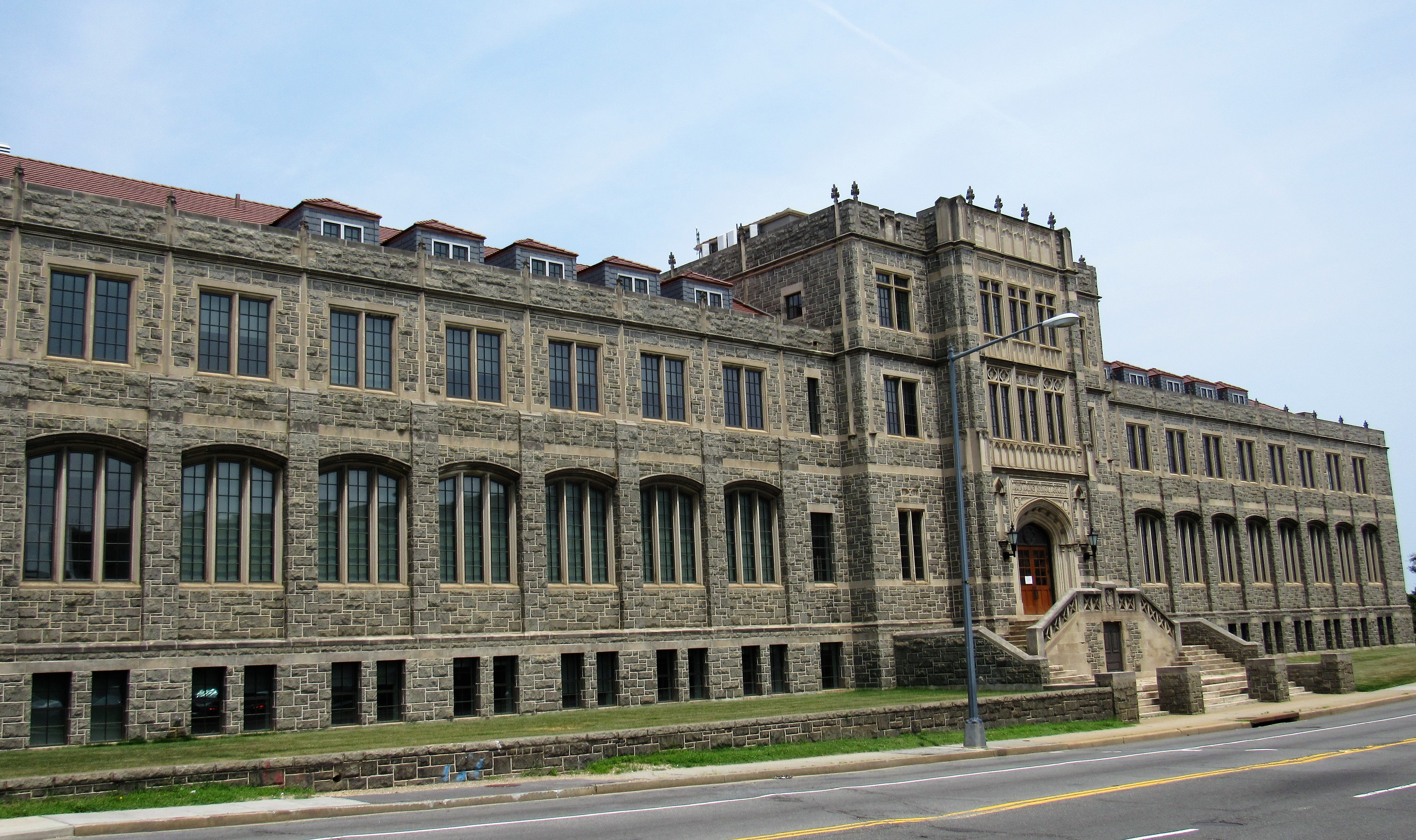
Maloney Hall

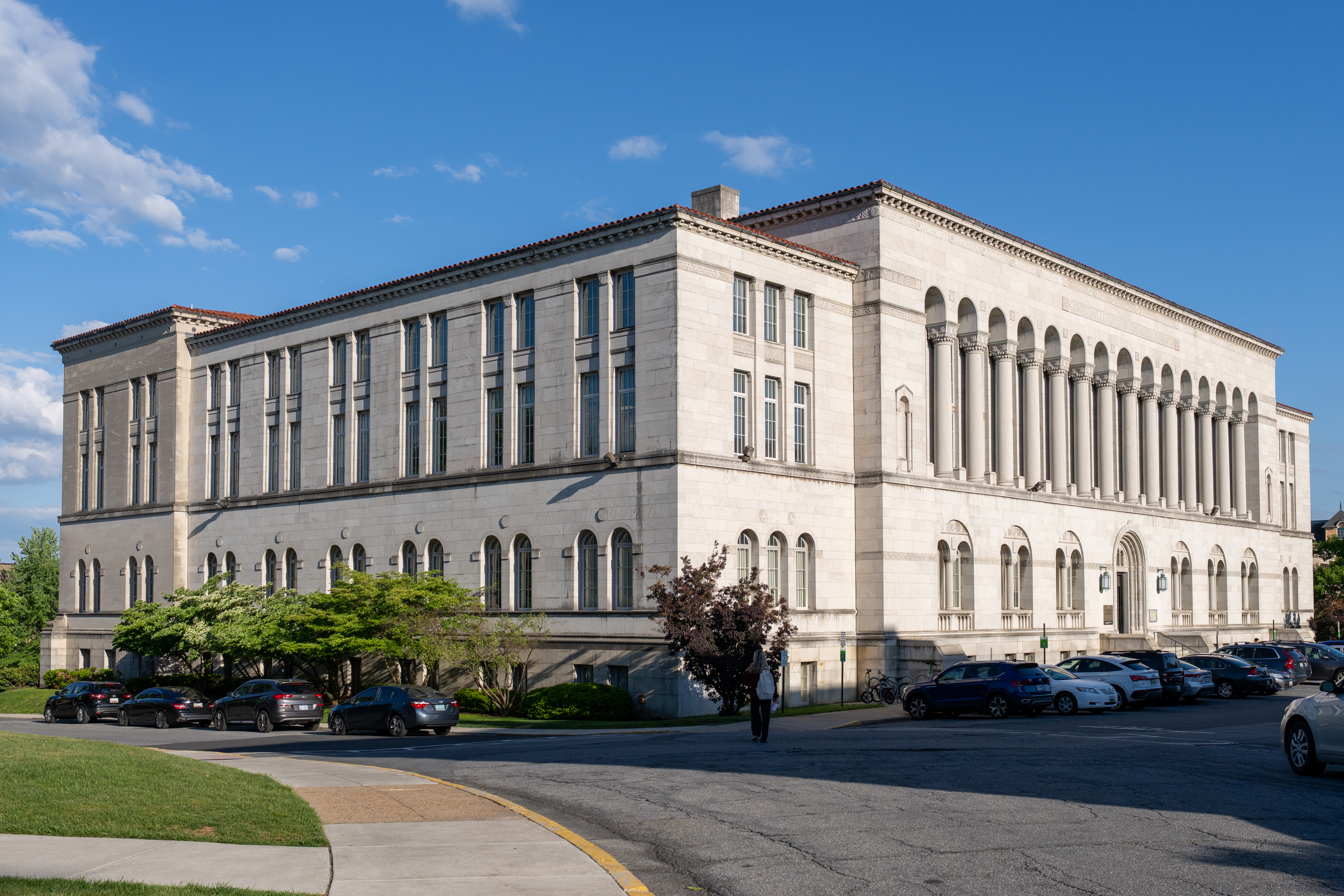
John K. Mullen of Denver Memorial Library (2026)

CUA's campus is in the residential community of Brookland in Northeast Washington; its main entrance is 620 Michigan Ave., NE. The campus is bound by Michigan Avenue to the south, North Capitol Street to the west, Hawaii Avenue to the north, and John McCormick Road to the east. It is three miles (5 km) north of the Capitol building.

The tree-lined campus is 193 acres (78 ha). Romanesque and modern design dominate among the university's 48 major buildings. Between McMahon and Gibbons halls and alongside the Basilica of the National Shrine of the Immaculate Conception runs The Mall, a large strip of grass often used by Ultimate Frisbee players and sunbathers. Conte Circle is in the middle of Centennial Village, a cluster of eight residential houses.

The Edward J. Pryzbyla University Center opened in the spring of 2003, bringing student dining services, the campus bookstore, student organization offices, an 800-person ballroom, a convenience store, and more student services under one roof. The John K. Mullen Library completed a $6,000,000 renovation in 2004.

Columbus School of Law is on the main campus and has a building with mock courtrooms, a library, chapel, classrooms, and offices.

Theological College, the United States' national Catholic seminary, is affiliated with CUA, sending students there for their studies. Also located near campus is the St. John Paul II Seminary, a minor seminary for the Archdiocese of Washington but also serving nearby dioceses and hosting seminarians from dioceses around the country. Students from the minor seminary study for their undergraduate philosophy degrees at the university. Several organizations of religious life also have seminaries nearby—including the Josephites, Carmelites, Franciscans, Oblates of Mary Immaculate, and Paulist Fathers, each of which send students to CUA.

In April 2004, CUA purchased 49 acres (20 ha) of land from the Armed Forces Retirement Home. It is the largest plot of open space in the District and makes CUA the largest university in D.C. by area. There are no plans for the parcel other than to secure it for future growth.

In 2007, CUA unveiled plans to expand its campus by adding three new dormitories to the north side of campus. The first of these, the seven-story Opus Hall, was completed in 2009 in the university's traditional Collegiate Gothic style. It houses 420 upper-class students and is Washington's first LEED-certified dormitory. Opus Hall is the first residential community to house both male and female students since the 2007 adoption of a single-sex dormitory policy.

In 2022, Welcome Plaza, located between Fr. O’Connell and Gibbons halls, was built to house the 4 ton sculpture Angels Unawares by Canadian artist Timothy Schmalz. A fountain was installed below the sculpture, creating an illusion that the boat is sailing forward within Welcome Plaza.

In 2011, CUA demolished Spalding, Conaty and Spellman dormitories, which allowed for the development of Monroe Street by Bozzuto contracting. In partnership with the university, Monroe Street Market and the Brookland Arts Walk opened in 2014. A CUA Barnes & Noble bookstore opened on Monroe. New apartments in the development allow older students the opportunity to reside off campus within walking distance of the university.

The campus is served by the Brookland-CUA station on the Red Line of the Washington Metro. Near the campus are the offices of the United States Conference of Catholic Bishops and the Franciscan Monastery of the Holy Land in America.

=== Green initiatives and sustainability ===
CUA has environmental sustainability programs, including participation in Earth Day, Casey Trees tree planting, and Campus Beautification Day. CUA's newest building, Opus Hall, is LEED-compliant, and the school buys 30% of its electricity from green sources. CUA participated in the 2010 College Sustainability Report Card rating.

In 2009, the School of Architecture and Planning introduced a Master of Science program in sustainable design.

== Satellite campuses ==
=== Rome ===
In 2015, CUA began a partnership with the Australian Catholic University to effectively own and operate a second campus in Rome, Italy. It is housed in a former convent and includes a chapel. Before being sent home during the COVID-19 pandemic, 35 students were at the campus.

=== Tucson ===
By 2015, Catholic University officials had recognized that most Hispanics in the United States are Catholics but historically have not had access to Catholic higher education in their areas. According to a university press release, an analysis by Catholic University found that of "the 25 U.S. cities with the largest total increases in the Hispanic population, nine have no Catholic college or university in close proximity."

Given this demographic reality, in 2017 Catholic University began exploring partnerships with existing institutions in the Southwest. Several cities with large populations of Hispanics and Catholics were considered when then-Tucson Mayor Jonathan Rothschild heard of Catholic University's desire to open a satellite campus and facilitated meetings between University leadership and then-Bishop of Tucson Gerald Kicanas.

In 2019, a partnership with Pima Community College was announced under which students could earn an associate degree from Pima and a bachelor's degree in business management from Catholic University's Metropolitan School of Professional Studies. Between 20 and 25 students were initially be admitted to the program, with 14 eventually enrolling for their studies at Catholic University Tucson.

Over the course of the program, two-thirds of courses are taken remotely and one-third are taken on the Pima campus. Local business leaders as well as faculty and staff at the Catholic University of America main campus in Washington, DC serve as adjunct professors.

The first class of four students graduated in 2024, and the program has grown from 14 to 65 students, with the further goal to double their enrollment by fall 2026.

=== Alexandria ===
In 2021, a new site in Alexandria, Virginia, occupying 18,500 square feet (1,720 m^{2}) on the second floor of Catholic Charities USA's headquarters building, was opened to offer a number of noncredit certificate programs. On May 31, 2024, the university closed the Alexandria facility due to lack of demand for the programs offered there.

== Academics ==
Academic rankings

National
- Forbes: 289
- U.S. News & World Report: 171 (tie)
- Washington Monthly: 232
- WSJ/College Pulse: Unranked

Global
- ARWU: Unranked
- QS: Unranked
- THE: 601–800
- U.S. News & World Report: 1,060 (tie)

Catholic University has 12 schools:

- School of Architecture and Planning
- School of Arts and Sciences
- Tim and Steph Busch School of Business
- School of Canon Law
- College of Engineering, Physics, and Computing
- Columbus School of Law
- Benjamin T. Rome School of Music, Drama, and Art
- Conway School of Nursing
- School of Philosophy
- Metropolitan School of Professional Studies
- National Catholic School of Social Service
- School of Theology and Religious Studies

It also has 21 research centers and facilities as well as serving as home to the Catholic University of America Press, established in 1939. The 12 schools offer Doctor of Philosophy degrees (or appropriate professional degrees) in 66 programs and Master's Degrees in 103 programs. Undergraduate degrees are awarded in 72 programs by six schools: architecture and planning, arts and sciences, engineering, music, nursing, and philosophy.

Undergraduates combine a liberal arts curriculum in arts and sciences with courses in a major field of study. The Metropolitan School provides programs for adults who wish to earn baccalaureate degrees or participate in continuing education and certificate programs on a part-time basis. Catholic University is the only U.S. university with an ecclesiastical faculty of canon law (established by the Holy See in 1923) and is one of the few U.S. universities with ecclesiastical faculties of philosophy and sacred theology. Theological College, the university seminary, prepares men for the priesthood. The School of Theology and Religious Studies is a member of the Washington Theological Consortium.

The Catholic University of America announced on January 8, 2013, the creation of a School of Business and Economics. Previously housed in the School of Arts and Sciences as Department of Business and Economics, the university's board of trustees voted in December 2012 to confirm the creation of the school commencing January 1, 2013, after a three-year process of discernment, evaluation, and planning. In fall 2013, the School of Library and Information Science became a department of the School of Arts and Sciences, giving the university its present composition.

Ninety-eight percent of full-time faculty have doctoral or terminal degrees and 68% teach undergraduates. Of the full-time faculty, 59% are Catholic. In 2018, every tenured and tenure track professor of biology received funding from the National Institutes of Health, which is "quite rare in any university".

CUA was one of the fourteen founding members of the Association of American Universities, although it withdrew its membership in 2002, citing a conflict with its mission. In addition, it has been recommended by the Cardinal Newman Society in The Newman Guide to Choosing a Catholic College. It was described as one of the 25 most underrated colleges in the United States.

=== Research centers and facilities ===
According to the National Science Foundation, CUA spent $25.5 million on research and development in 2018.

Over time, several national Catholic scholarly associations became based at the university, including the Catholic Biblical Association of America, publisher of the Catholic Biblical Quarterly, and (for many years) the American Catholic Philosophical Association. The university is also home to the Catholic University of America Press.

Research institutes located here include:

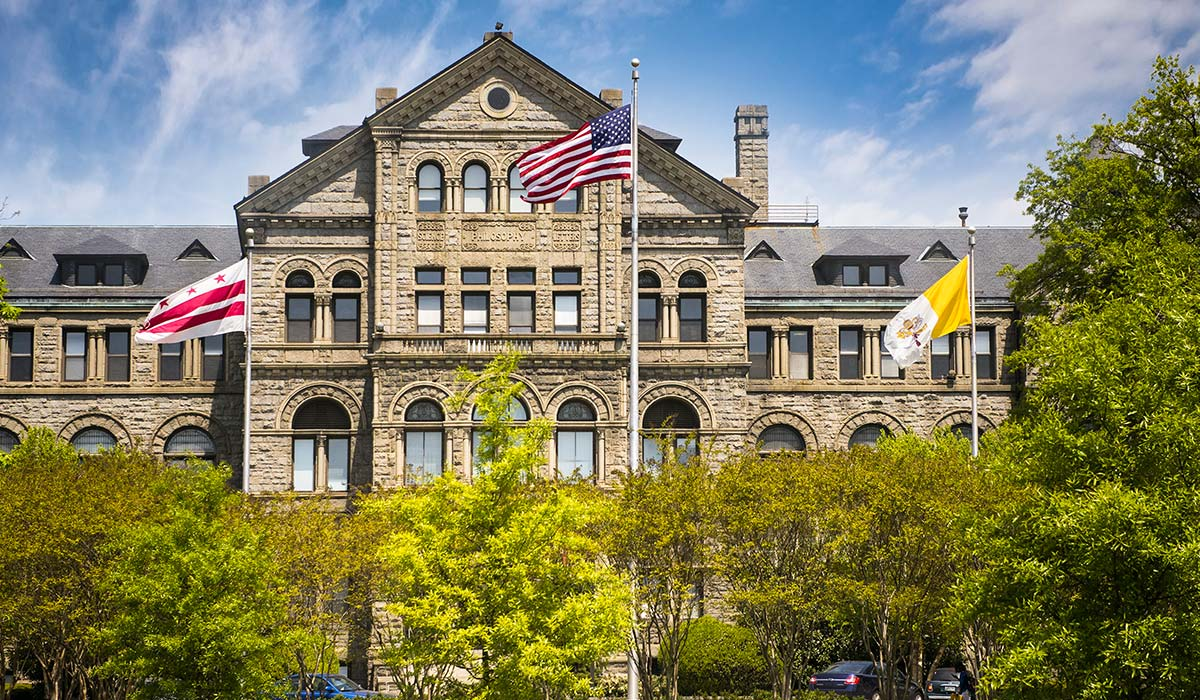
- McMahon Hall
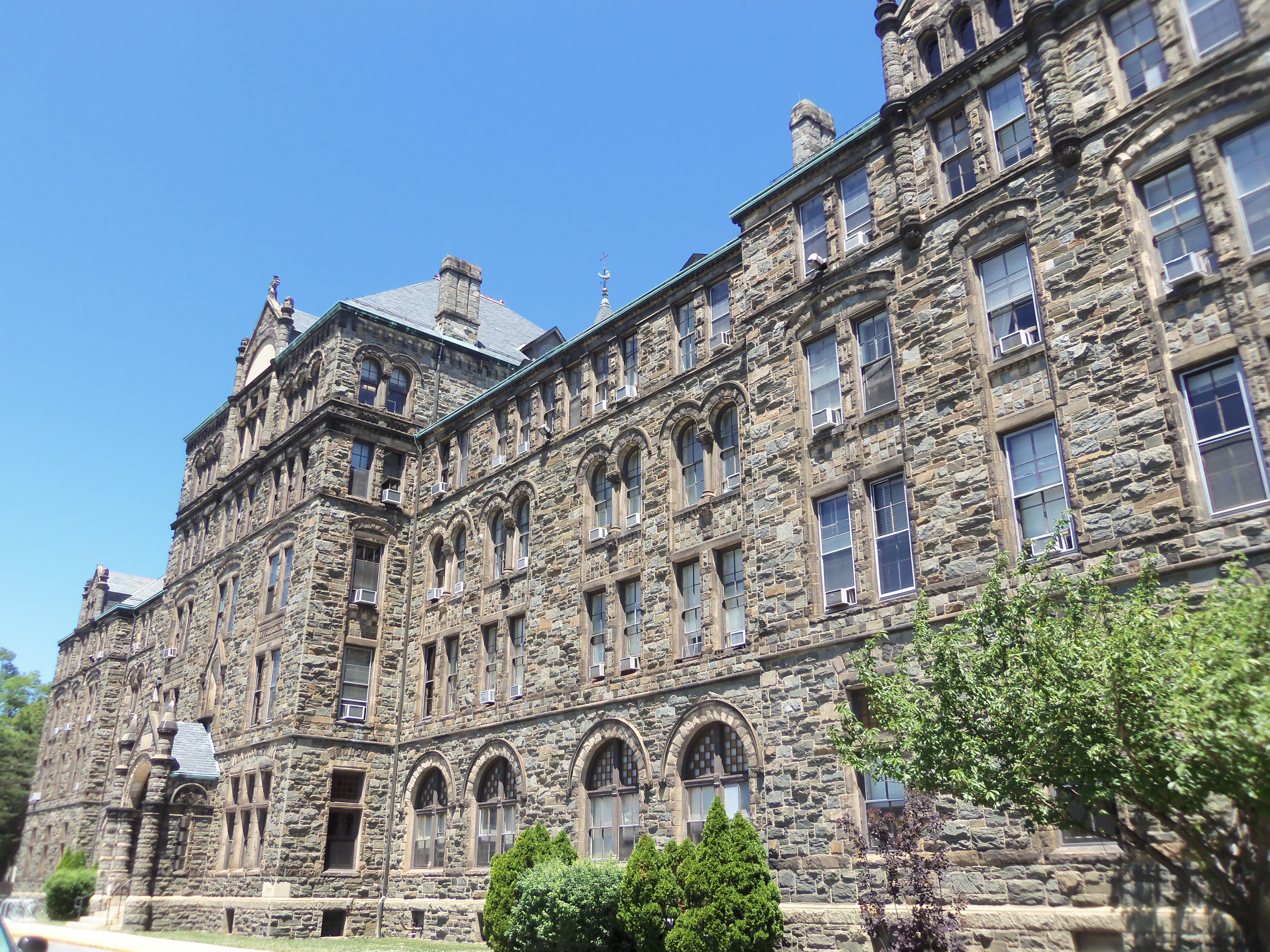
  Caldwell Hall
  Center for Advanced Training in Cell and Molecular Biology
- Center for Advancement of Catholic Education
- Center for American Catholic Studies
- Center for Catalan Studies
- Center for Irish Studies
- Center for Medieval and Byzantine Studies
- Center for Pastoral Studies
- Center for the Study of Culture and Values
- Center for the Study of Early Christianity
- Center for the Study of Energy and Environmental Stewardship
- Center for Ward Method Studies
- Homecare and Telerehabilitation Technology Center
- Institute for Astrophysics and Computational Sciences
- Institute for Biomolecular Studies
- Institute for Christian Oriental Research
- Institute for Communications Law Studies
- Institute for Policy Research and Catholic Studies
- Institute for Sacred Music
- Institute for Social Justice
- Institute of Musical Arts
- Latin American Center for Graduate Studies in Music
- Vitreous State Laboratory

=== Libraries ===
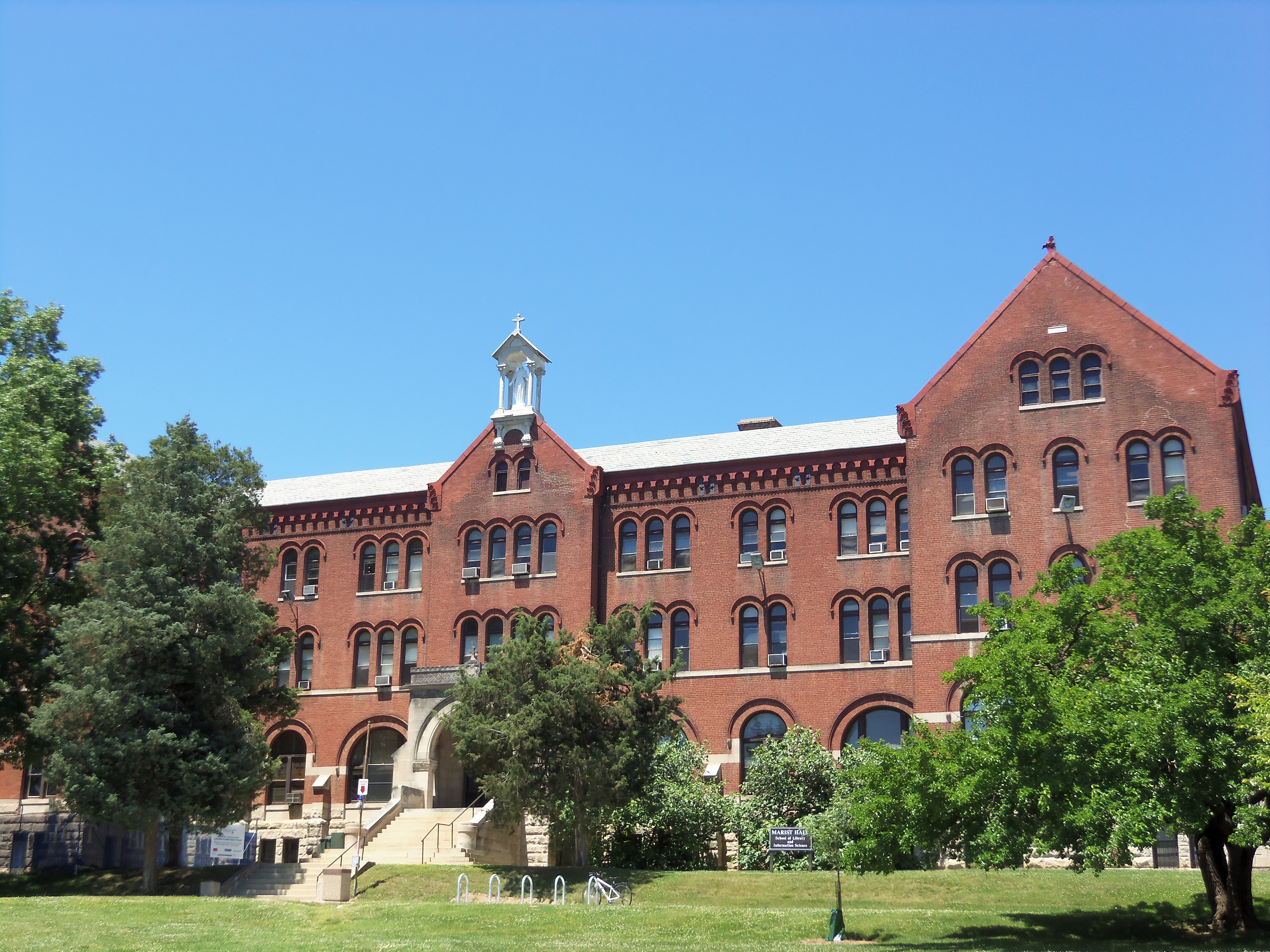
Marist Hall, built in 1899

The main library on campus is the John K. Mullen of Denver Memorial Library. The library system houses more than 1.3 million books and print volumes and provides access to tens of thousands of electronic journals and books. The university is also a partner in the Washington Research Library Consortium. The special collections of the university support advanced research and preserve University records, manuscript collections, and audiovisual materials which document the history of Catholics in America and the history of Catholic University. Rare books collections contain materials ranging from medieval manuscripts to modern first editions. The Semitics/Institute of Christian Oriental Research (ICOR) library supports research on the languages of the Bible and the ancient Near East. A special autonomous library, the Oliveira Lima Library, sometimes referred to as the Ibero-American Library, houses one of the largest collections of rare books on history and literature of Portuguese Brazilian culture outside of Brazil.

=== Academic freedom ===
==== Dismissal of Professor Charles Curran ====
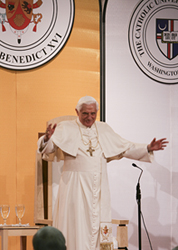
Pope Benedict XVI about to address a crowd at the university in April 2008

In 1967, a tenured professor of theology, Reverend Charles E. Curran, was fired for his views on birth control but was reinstated after a five-day faculty-led strike. In 1986, the Vatican declared that Curran could no longer teach theology at Catholic University after the Curia department in charge of promulgating Catholic doctrine, headed by Joseph Cardinal Ratzinger, decided he was unfit. The areas of dispute included publishing articles that debated theological and ethical views regarding divorce, artificial contraception, masturbation, pre-marital intercourse, and homosexual acts.

A report American Association of University Professors noted, "Had it not been for the intervention of the Sacred Congregation for the Doctrine of the Faith, Professor Curran would undoubtedly still be active in the university's Department of Theology, a popular teacher, honored theologian, and respected colleague." Curran's attorneys argued that CUA did not follow proper procedures or its policy statements in handling the case. In response, CUA claimed that the Vatican's actions against Curran trumped any campus-based policy or tenure rules. In 1989, Curran filed suit against Catholic University, claiming unlawful termination. Curran's case was ultimately dismissed; the court found Catholic University had the right to fire Curran for teaching theology from a viewpoint that contradicted the school's religion.

In 1990, the AAUP defended Curran and censured Catholic University's administration for failing to adhere to the AAUP's Principles on Academic Freedom and Tenure. The AAUP found that "unsatisfactory conditions of academic freedom and tenure have been found to prevail" at The Catholic University of America. As of May 2025, the administration of Catholic University remains on the list of censured institutions. AAUP censure is a purely symbolic designation that does not effect an institution's accreditation or the standing of AAUP members and prospective members on the faculty at a school whose administration remains under censure.

The administration of Catholic University has consistently reached out to the AAUP to explore lifting the censure. The two conditions for having the censure removed are inviting Curran, whose license to teach Catholic theology had been suspended by the Vatican, back to campus and changing the university's "Statement on Academic Freedom". President David M. O'Connell refused to do either, saying, "every American university has a right to govern itself according to its own identity, mission, standards, and procedures." The Vatican's decision regarding Curran's qualifications to teach Catholic theology was made unilaterally and is unlikely to change unless Curran's stances come into compliance with church teachings. The Catholic University of America's bylaws require the school to comply with relevant Vatican policies and designates that the Archbishop of Washington D.C., who is chosen by the Vatican, is ex officio the school's chancellor. This system makes it extremely unlikely Catholic University will amend the school's charter and come into compliance with the current conditions expressed by the AAUP for lifting their censure of the school's administration.

==== Speaker policy ====
The university as a policy does not allow outside guests to speak on campus to any audience if they have previously expressed an opinion on abortion or other serious issues conflicting with the Catholic Church's teaching. Applying this policy in 2004, CUA was criticized for rescinding Stanley Tucci's invitation for a seminar about Italian cinema, because he had lent past support for Planned Parenthood.

The next year, in 2005, the school was criticized for initially rejecting an application for recognition of a student chapter of the NAACP; one of the reasons officials cited in its rejection was the national organization's pro-choice stance. In 2006 the CUA administration barred a student-run on-campus performance of Eve Ensler's The Vagina Monologues.

In 2009, the school made its speaker policy more stringent, prohibiting all candidates for political office from speaking on campus. Representatives of both Democratic and Republican clubs on campus have criticized the decision.

In January 2024, the university terminated a psychology lecturer who had invited a guest speaker whose "views on life issues and on the anthropology of the human person were not consistent with our mission and identity as a faithful Catholic university."

== Demographics ==
The student population in 2019 was 5,059. Approximately 91% of undergraduates receive some form of financial aid. There are slightly more female students at 53%, and a 1:7 faculty to student ratio. 83.8% of full-time faculty have a terminal degree.

== Student life ==
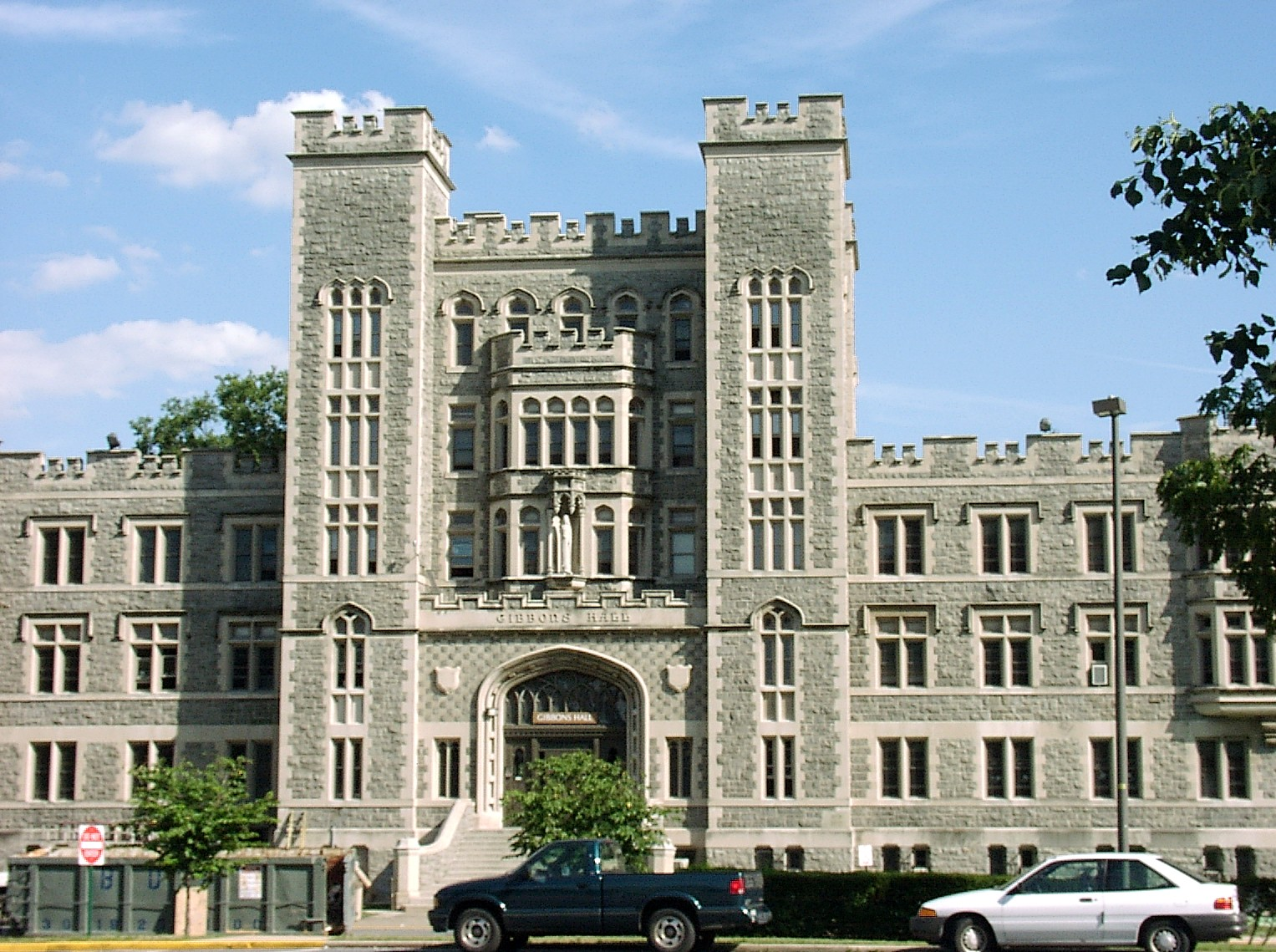
Gibbons Hall, a residence hall at the university built in 1911

There are over 100 registered student clubs and organizations at CUA for a wide variety of interests including athletics, academics, social, Greek life, service, political and religious. Annual events include week-long Homecoming celebrations, the Mr. CUA competition, and several dances including the Beaux Arts Ball, the Mistletoe Ball, and the Athletes Ball. In addition to radio station WCUA, other campus media outlets include The Crosier, a scholarly publication concerning Catholic social teaching, The Tower, the campus' independent weekly newspaper, and CRUX, a literary magazine. Although Catholic University states that it does not have any Greek life on campus, it has three Greek social organizations and one Greek service organization. Catholic University Greek life includes Alpha Delta Gamma, the national Catholic social fraternity–Kappa chapter, and Kappa Tau Gamma, the local Christian social-service sorority. Although not officially recognized by the university, the Sigma-Psi chapter of Kappa Sigma fraternity received an official charter in 2014. The members are all students of the university and are active on and around the campus. Alpha Phi Omega, a national service fraternity, has Zeta Mu chapter first chartered in 1950.

=== Music and drama ===
The music and drama programs, as part of a class, stage productions each semester, performances ranging from Broadway productions to plays and operas. Catholic University students also participate in a symphony orchestra and choral groups, including a cappella groups Take Note, RedLine, and the Washingtones.

There have been several songs associated with the university over the years. The most recent fight song, written by Steve Schatz, was adopted in 2002. The original fight song, "The Flying Cardinals", dates back to before the 1930s. There are two alma maters, considered to be the university's official songs. The first, "Hail CUA" was set to music composed by Victor Herbert and was adopted in 1920. The other, "Guardians of Truth" by Fr. Thomas McLean, actually came in 2nd place in the 1920 competition but was widely adopted in the ensuing years.

Albert Von Tilzer, composer of Take Me Out to the Ball Game, wrote two songs for the university, We're Rooting For You and CU Will Shine Tonight. The earliest sports song, Through the Town, dates from 1916. Drink a Highball was a popular song during Prohibition. In honor of the university's 125th anniversary, an hour-long nostalgic musical revue was performed.

=== Campus ministry and religious life ===
84% of undergraduates and 59% of graduate students self-identify as Catholic. The campus ministry has two groups of student ministers: the resident ministers, who live in residence halls and focus primarily on upperclassmen, and the house members, who focus on first year freshmen.

The Friday Night Planning Committee works with the house members to plan activities for Friday nights that are alcohol-free. Campus ministry also coordinates university liturgies, plans and runs retreats, and operates the online Prayernet.

== Athletics ==
Catholic University of America's athletic teams are the Catholic University Cardinals. The university is a member of the Division III of the National Collegiate Athletic Association (NCAA), primarily competing in the Landmark Conference for most of its sports since the 2007–08 academic year. They are associate members of the Mid-Atlantic Rowing Conference for rowing. The team colors are red (PMS 1805) and black. The first recorded football game was played against Mount Saint Mary's College on November 28, 1895, but records indicate earlier track and field events.

The university beat the University of Mississippi at the second Orange Bowl in 1936, 20–19. They also tied the Arizona State Teachers College at Tempe (now Arizona State University) in the 1940 Sun Bowl. The basketball Cardinals played in the 1944 NCAA basketball tournament, finishing as the Eastern Fourth Place team in the eight-team era of the tournament. They lost to runner-up Dartmouth College 63-38 in the regional semifinals, and Temple University 55-35 in the regional consolation game.

CUA competes in 25 NCAA Division III intercollegiate varsity sports: Men's sports include baseball, basketball, cross country, football, golf, lacrosse, rowing, soccer, swimming & diving, tennis and track & field (indoor and outdoor); while women's sports include basketball, cross country, field hockey, golf, lacrosse, rowing, soccer, softball, swimming & diving, tennis, track & field (indoor and outdoor) and volleyball.

=== Non-varsity sports ===
Students field club teams in sports including cheerleading, ice hockey, rugby, sailing, and lacrosse.

- The ice hockey team competes in the Delaware Valley Collegiate Hockey Conference (DVCHC) of the ACHA and plays at the Fort Dupont Ice Arena in Washington, D.C. The team won the Mason-Dixon Collegiate Hockey Association (MDCHA) Championship in 2009, the Blue Ridge Hockey Conference (BRHC) Championship in 2015, and the DVCHC Patriot Division Championship in 2019.
- The men's club lacrosse team competes in Division 2 of the Chesapeake Conference in the National College Lacrosse League. The team has secured the NCLL Division 2 National Championship for 2015, 2016, and 2017.
- The men's rugby team competes in the Potomac Rugby Conference of the NSCRO.
- The women's rugby team competes in the Capital Rugby Union of the NSCRO.
- The sailing team competes in the Middle Atlantic Intercollegiate Sailing Association of the ICSA.

== Notable alumni and faculty ==
Notable alumni of Catholic University of America include cardinals, bishops, priests, and nuns. CUA's current total of alumni exceeds 83,000, including 12 living cardinals. In 1942, Catholic University became the first university to award a doctorate in geology to an African American, Marguerite Williams.

Notable Catholic University of America alumni include:

Blessed Fulton J. Sheen, 1920, and faculty from 1926 to 1950 in theology and philosophy, J.C.B., former Auxiliary Bishop of New York and Bishop of Rochester and host, Life is Worth Living

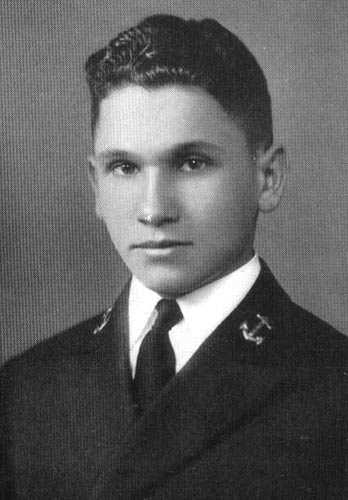
Joseph Weber, Ph.D. 1951, developed the first gravitational wave detectors and first suggested the use of laser interferometry in the field

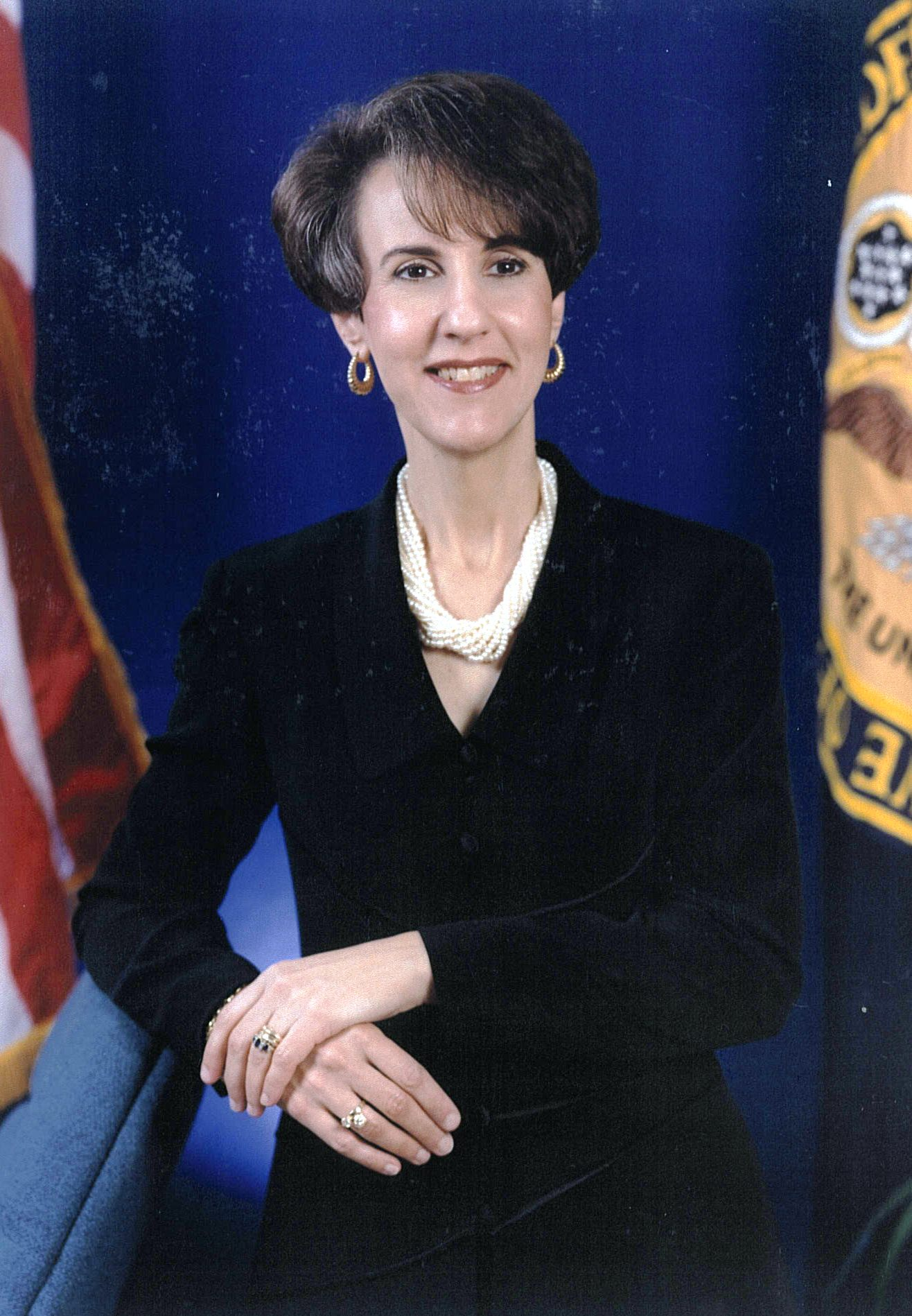
Charlene Barshefsky, J.D. 1975, former U.S. Trade Representative ambassador under Bill Clinton

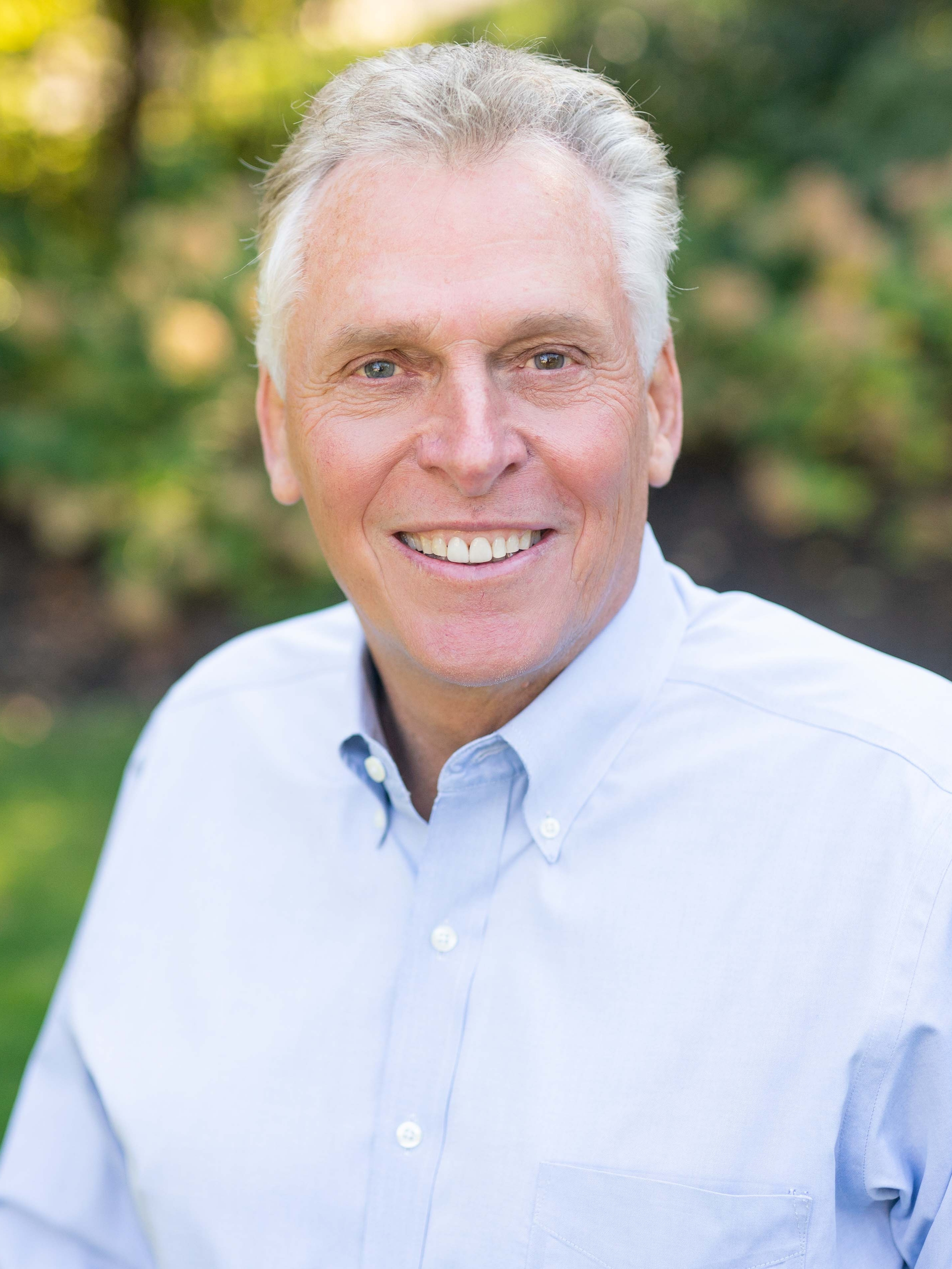
Terence R. McAuliffe, B.A. 1979, former governor of Virginia and former chairman, Democratic National Committee

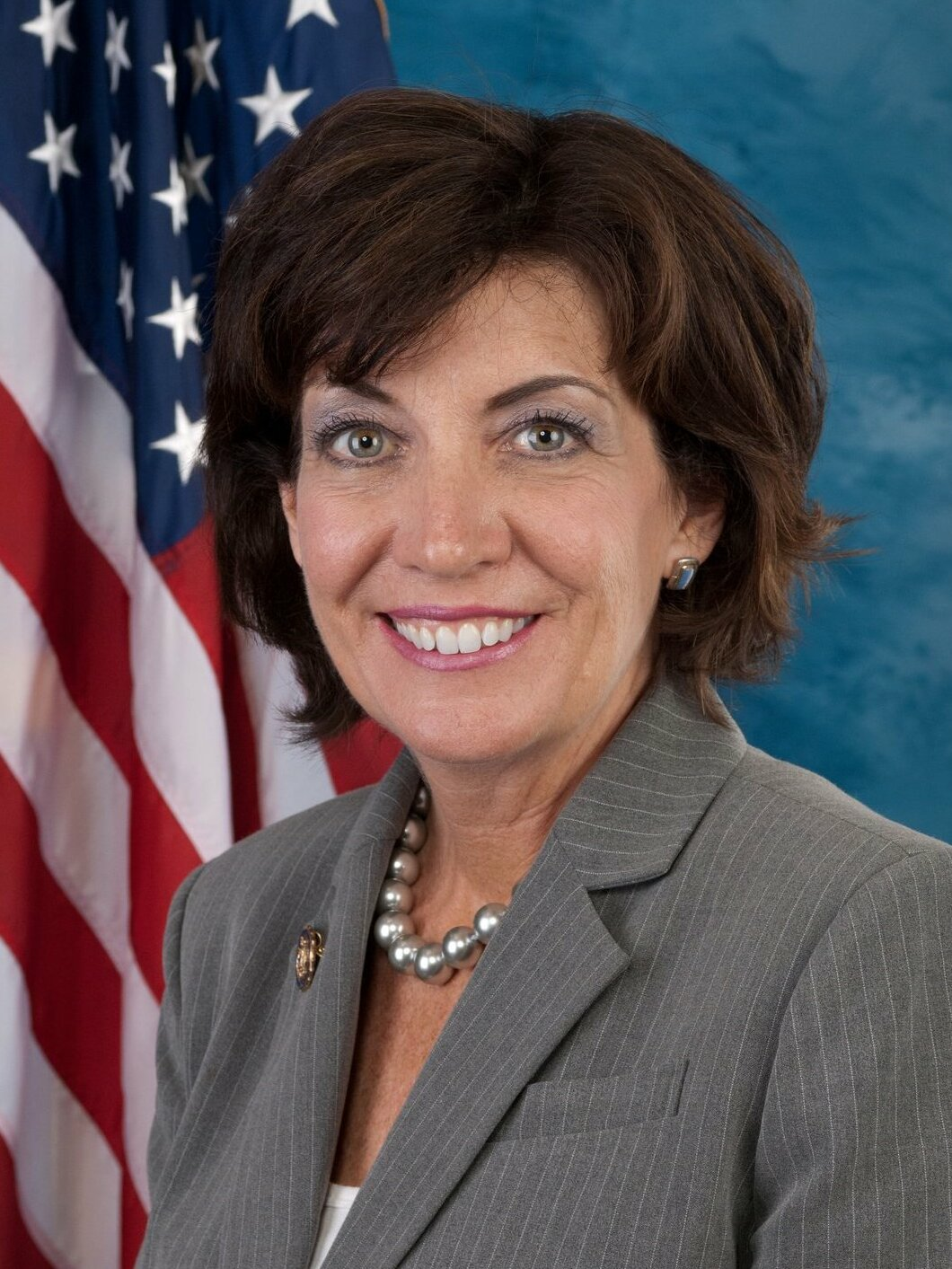
Kathy Hochul, J.D. 1984, 57th Governor of New York

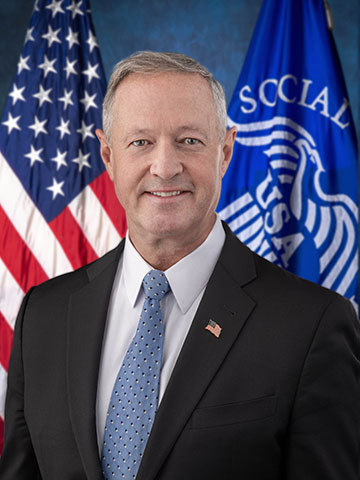
Martin O'Malley, B.A. 1985, former mayor of Baltimore and former governor of Maryland

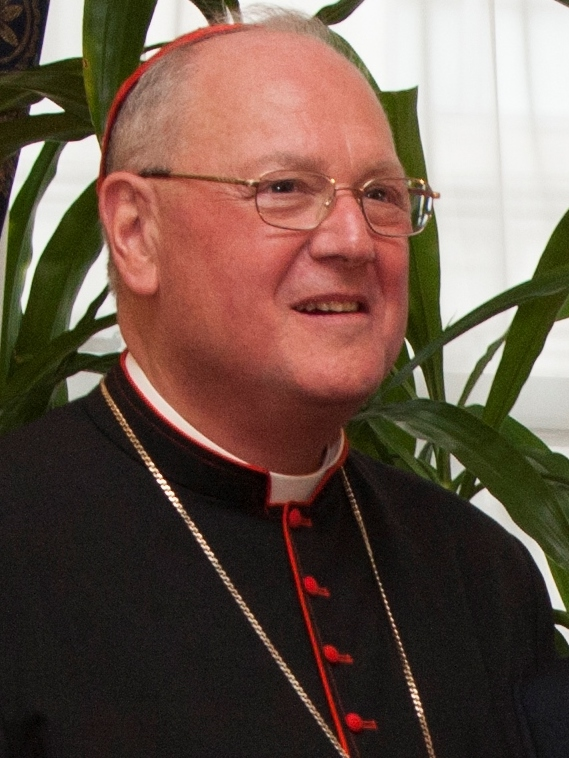
Timothy Dolan, Ph.D., 1985, Cardinal and Archbishop Emeritus of New York

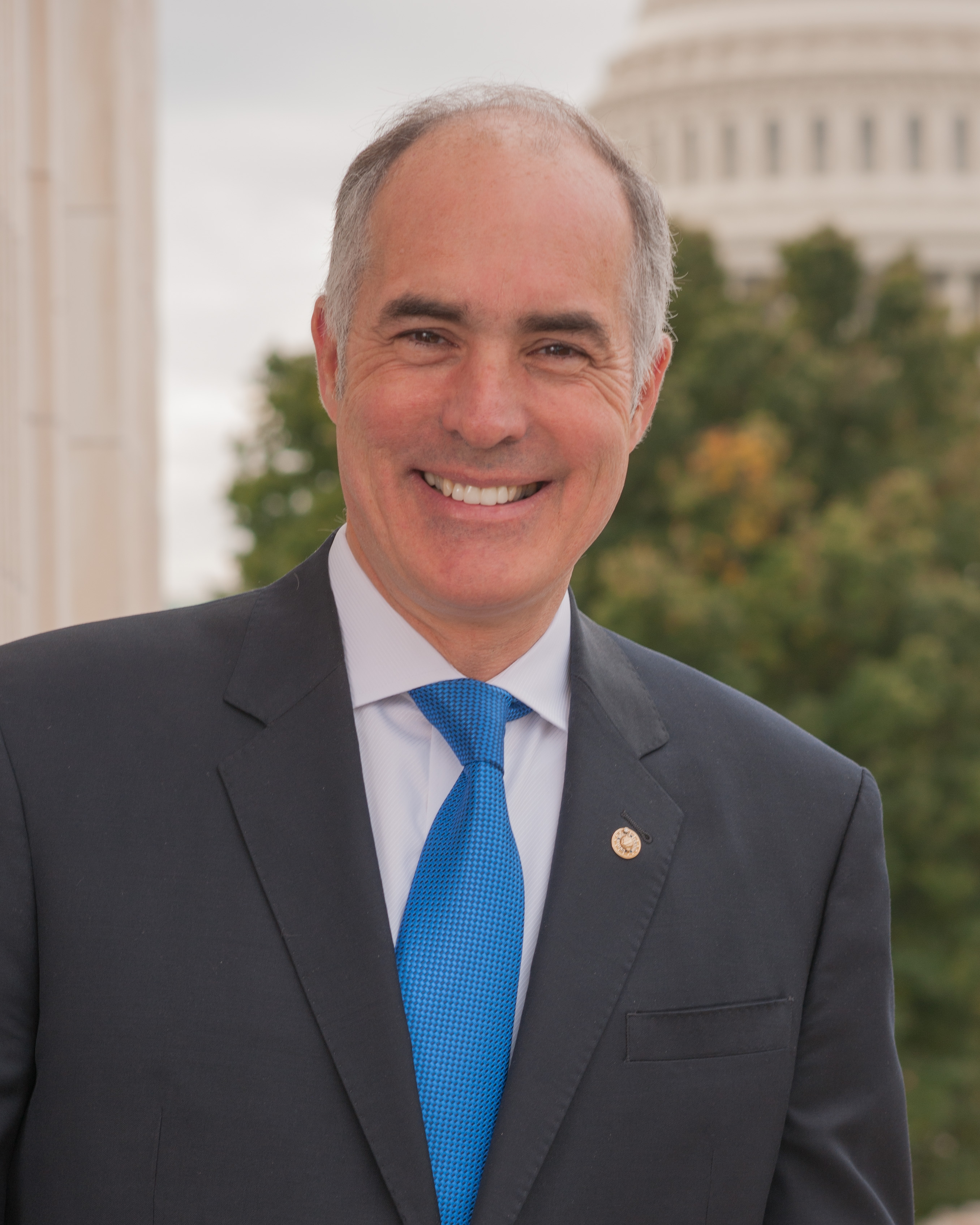
Bob Casey, Jr., J.D. 1988, former U.S. Senator from Pennsylvania

== University rectors and presidents ==
- John J. Keane (1887–1896)
- Thomas J. Conaty (1896–1903)
- Denis J. O'Connell (1903–1909)
- Thomas J. Shahan (1909–1927)
- James Hugh Ryan (1928–1935)
- Joseph M. Corrigan (1936–1942)
- Patrick J. McCormick (1943–1953)
- Bryan J. McEntegart (1953–1957)
- William J. McDonald (1957–1967, last rector)
- Clarence C. Walton (1969–1978, first president)
- Edmund D. Pellegrino (1978–1982)
- William J. Byron (1982–1992)
- Patrick Ellis (1992–1998)
- David M. O'Connell (1998–2010)
- John H. Garvey (2010–2022)
- Peter Kilpatrick (2022–present)

== Board of trustees ==
CUA was founded by the nation's bishops and they continue to have a presence on the board of trustees. There are 48 elected members and the bylaws stipulate that 24 must be clerics, 18 of whom must be members of the bishops' conference. Of the 51 total trustees (including the university president), 24 are bishops (including seven cardinals). In addition, there is one religious sister and two priests.

== See also ==
- Catholic higher education
- Catholic University of Ireland
