= List of Catholic University of America buildings =

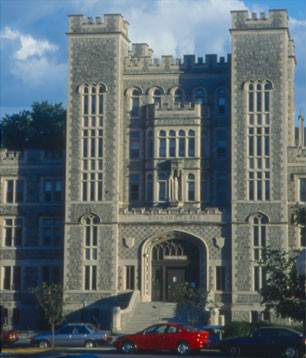
Gibbons Hall

The following is a list of buildings at the Catholic University of America. As with most college campuses, classes of many different fields are taught in most of the buildings; the list of buildings below is not meant to be exhaustive, but is the primary building for those courses.

== South Campus Buildings ==
- Conaty Hall – Demolished March 2011 (property redeveloped as part of Monroe Street Market)
- Saint Bonaventure Hall – Demolished December 2007 (property redeveloped as part of Monroe Street Market)
- Spalding Hall – Demolished March 2011 (property redeveloped as part of Monroe Street Market)
- Spellman Hall – Demolished March 2011 (property redeveloped as part of Monroe Street Market)
- Theological College – University Seminary

== Central Campus Buildings ==
'The Pryz'

McMahon Hall

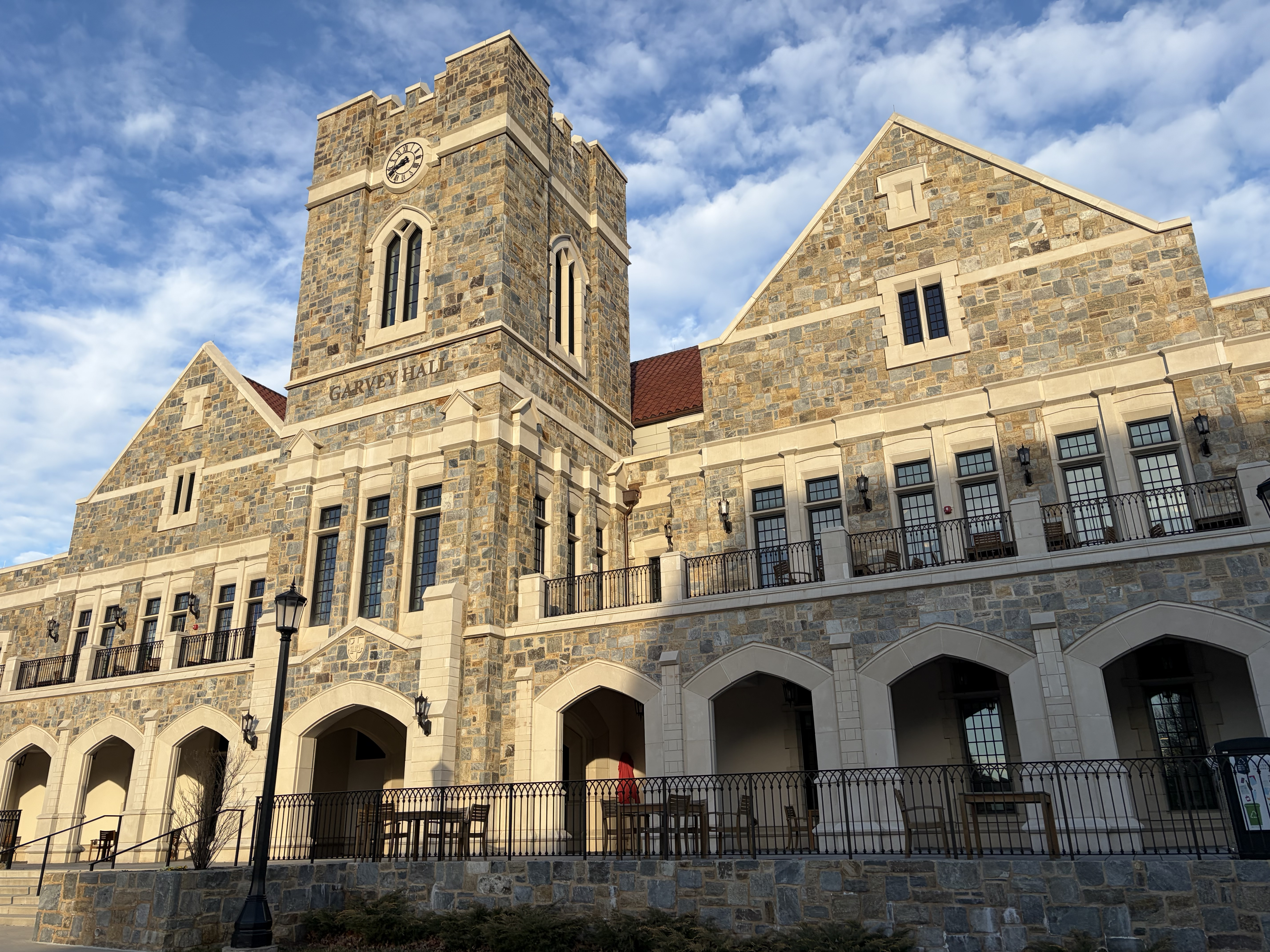
Garvey Hall, built in 2022

- Caldwell Hall (originally known as Divinity Hall) – This was the original building of the university, built in 1888. Caldwell Hall currently serves as the location of the School of Canon Law, the School of Theology and Religious Studies, and the offices of the University Chaplain and Campus Ministry. Caldwell Hall also has housing for graduate and undergraduate students.
  - Elizabeth Ann Seton Wing of Caldwell Hall is the mixed housing wing for undergraduate and graduate women.
  - The House is housing for Campus Ministry student ministers.
- Centennial Village is housing for undergraduates, and contains the following houses:
  - Camalier House
  - Engelhard House
  - McDonald House
  - Quinn House
  - Reardon House
  - Unanue House
  - Walton House
- John H. Garvey Dining Hall (Built 2022)
- Columbus School of Law
- Edward M. Crough Center for Architectural Studies (School of Architecture and Planning); originally Brookland Gymnasium.
- Gibbons Hall contains the Center for the Study of Culture and Values, the Intensive English Program, classrooms, and housing for undergraduates.
- Gowan Hall is the administrative home of the School of Professional Studies and the Institute for Policy Research and Catholic Studies.
- Hannan Hall is the location of the Department of Physics, the Vitreous State Laboratory, and Herzfeld Auditorium.
- Gilbert V. Hartke Theatre includes Callan Theatre, the Lab Theatre, and the offices of the Department of Drama.
- Leahy Hall – Originally built for the Columbus School of Law, Leahy Hall is the chief administrative building of the university, with offices for the departments of Public Safety, Human Resources, Finance and Budget, CUA Press, and the Office of the General Counsel.
- Maloney Hall once housed the Department of Chemistry. It is currently the home of the Busch School of Business and Economics
- McCort-Ward Hall houses classrooms and offices for the Department of Biology and the School of Nursing.
- McGivney Hall (formerly Keane Hall) serves as the home for the North American campus of the Pontifical John Paul II Institute for Studies on Marriage and Family.
- McMahon Hall is the second-oldest building on campus. McMahon Hall contains the offices of the Provost, Graduate Studies, Undergraduate Studies, Undergraduate Advising, Career and Academic Services, the School of Arts and Sciences, the Department of Modern Languages and Linguistics, the Department of Greek and Latin, and the University post office.
- The John K. Mullen of Denver Memorial Library is the University's main library. It houses over 500,000 bound volumes on-site and serves as the home of the Semitics/ICOR Library, the Oliveira Lima Library, and the Rare Books collections. Mullen Library provides a variety of spaces to accommodate collaborative and individual learning and provides technologies which support the use of library resources. Related academic units which provide tutoring services here include the Center for Academic and Career Success, the Math Center and the Writing Center.
- Nursing-Biology Building
- O'Connell Hall (formerly Cardinal Hall and University Center West & East) houses University Admissions, Enrollment Management, Enrollment Services, and Student Financial Services. O'Connell Hall is named for the Most Rev. David M. O'Connell, 14th president of the university and Bishop of Trenton (NJ). It was originally built by the Knights of Columbus and was known as Graduate Hall when it housed the Knights of Columbus fellows.
- Pangborn Hall contains the offices and classrooms of the School of Engineering.
- Edward J. Pryzbyla University Center is the student center for CUA. It contains the offices for the Dean of Students, dining services, disability support services, and various student organizations. "The Pryz" also contains the student cafeteria, a food court, the campus Starbucks, a convenience store, and various meeting spaces.
- Salve Regina Hall is used by the Department of Art for various art studios.
- Shahan Hall holds the main offices and classrooms for the National Catholic School of Social Service.
- Ward Hall contains the offices, classrooms, recital halls and performance halls for the Benjamin T. Rome School of Music, Drama, and Art.

== Former Central Campus Buildings ==
- Albert Hall (also known as Keane Hall). The first residence building along Michigan Avenue, Albert Hall was demolished in 1970.
- Brookland Stadium was located in the lawn area between the Edward J. Pryzbyla University Center and the Columbus School of Law. The remnants of the stadium's bleachers can be found in the sloped areas surrounding the lawn.
- Magner House was demolished in fall 2019 to make way for Garvey Hall.
- Visitors Information Center (formerly a bank) was demolished in Spring 2008.

== North Campus Buildings ==
- Aquinas Hall (formerly Life Cycle Institute) contains the main offices and classrooms of the School of Philosophy. Aquinas Hall also houses the departments of Mathematics and Sociology, and the University Archives.
- Curley Hall is the main priests' residence of the university. It sits on land once used as Edward L. Killion Field, an athletic field named in honor of an alumnus who died in World War I.
- Raymond A. DuFour Athletic Center has a pool, gym, playing fields, and fitness center. The DuFour Center is the university's main intercollegiate athletics facility, and is the location of Cardinal Stadium.
- Grounds Maintenance Complex
- Flather Hall is housing for undergraduate students.
- Eugene I. Kane Student Health and Fitness Center holds the university's infirmary and student gymnasium.
- Marist Hall formerly contained offices and classrooms for the Departments of Anthropology, English, History, Media Studies, Politics, and Sociology, as well as the Center for Medieval and Byzantine Studies. Marist Hall also housed the Office of Marketing and Communications. The building was closed in 2016 over safety concerns and structural issues connected to the building's shifting foundation caused by an earthquake in 2011.
- Marist Hall Annex is the location of University Facilities Management and the Office of Ethics and Compliance, as well as the Department of English and Department of History.
- Millennium Hall (North and South) holds apartments and suites for juniors, seniors, and graduate students.
- Nugent Hall is the office and private residence of the University President.
- O'Boyle Hall contains the Counseling Center and offices of the Departments of Education and Psychology.
- Opus Hall is a 7-story residence hall.
- Regan Hall houses students from the University Honors program.
- Ryan Hall is housing for undergraduate students.
- University Chapel of St. Vincent de Paul is the main chapel for Catholic Masses and periodic music recitals.

== Buildings Adjacent to Campus ==
- The Basilica of the National Shrine of the Immaculate Conception, the largest Catholic church in the United States and North America, one of the ten largest churches in the world, and the tallest habitable building in Washington, D.C., was built on land donated by The Catholic University of America in 1913.
- The Dominican House of Studies is located directly across from O'Connell Hall, and is often associated with the university, as some of the Dominican friars in residence at the Priory of the Immaculate Conception are enrolled at CUA.
