= Frederick V. Murphy =

American architect (1879–1958)

- Born: February 16, 1879; Fond du Lac, Wisconsin
- Died: May 4, 1958 (aged 79); Chevy Chase, Maryland
- Occupation: Architect

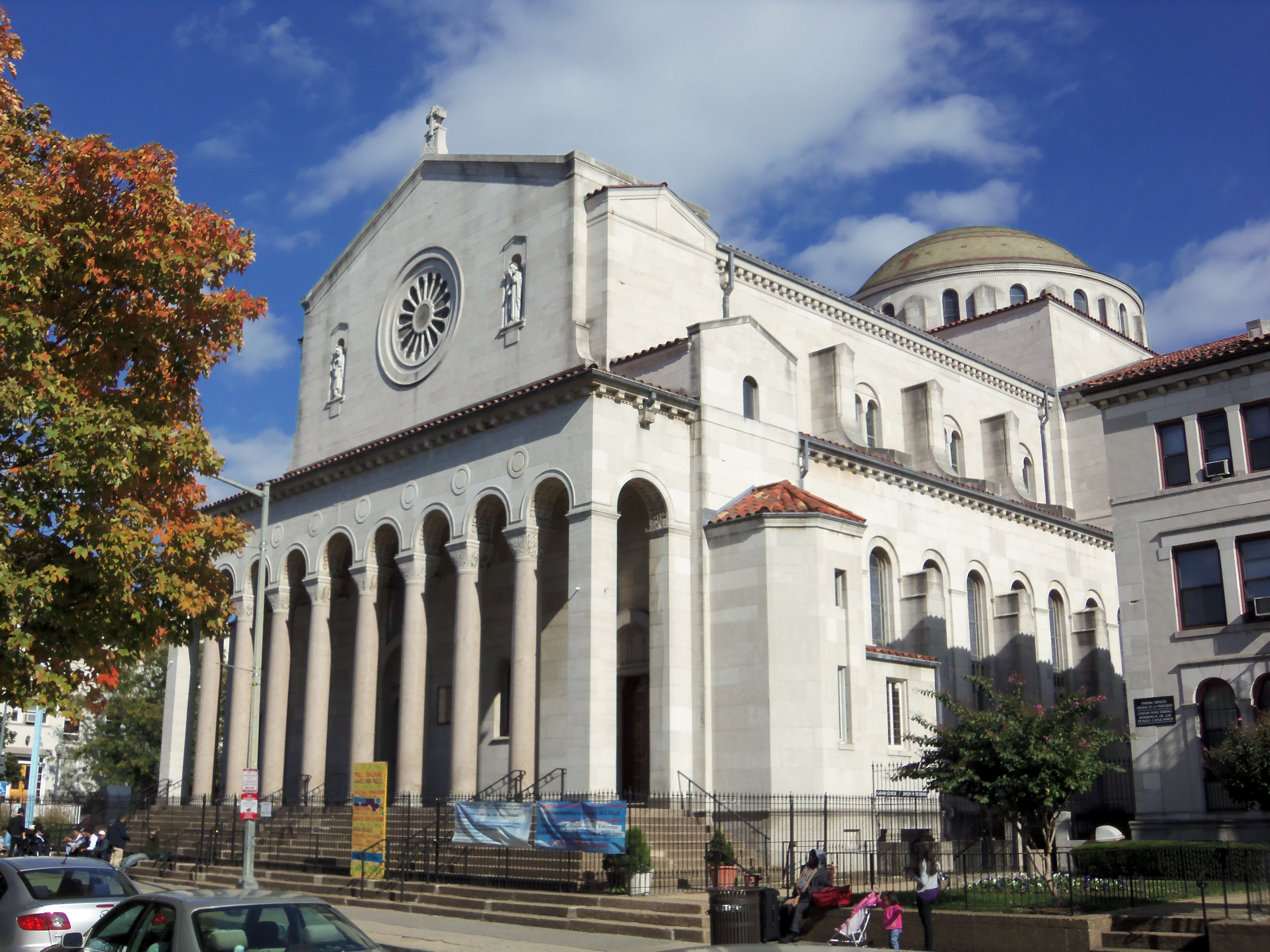
The Shrine of the Sacred Heart in Washington, D.C., completed in 1922.

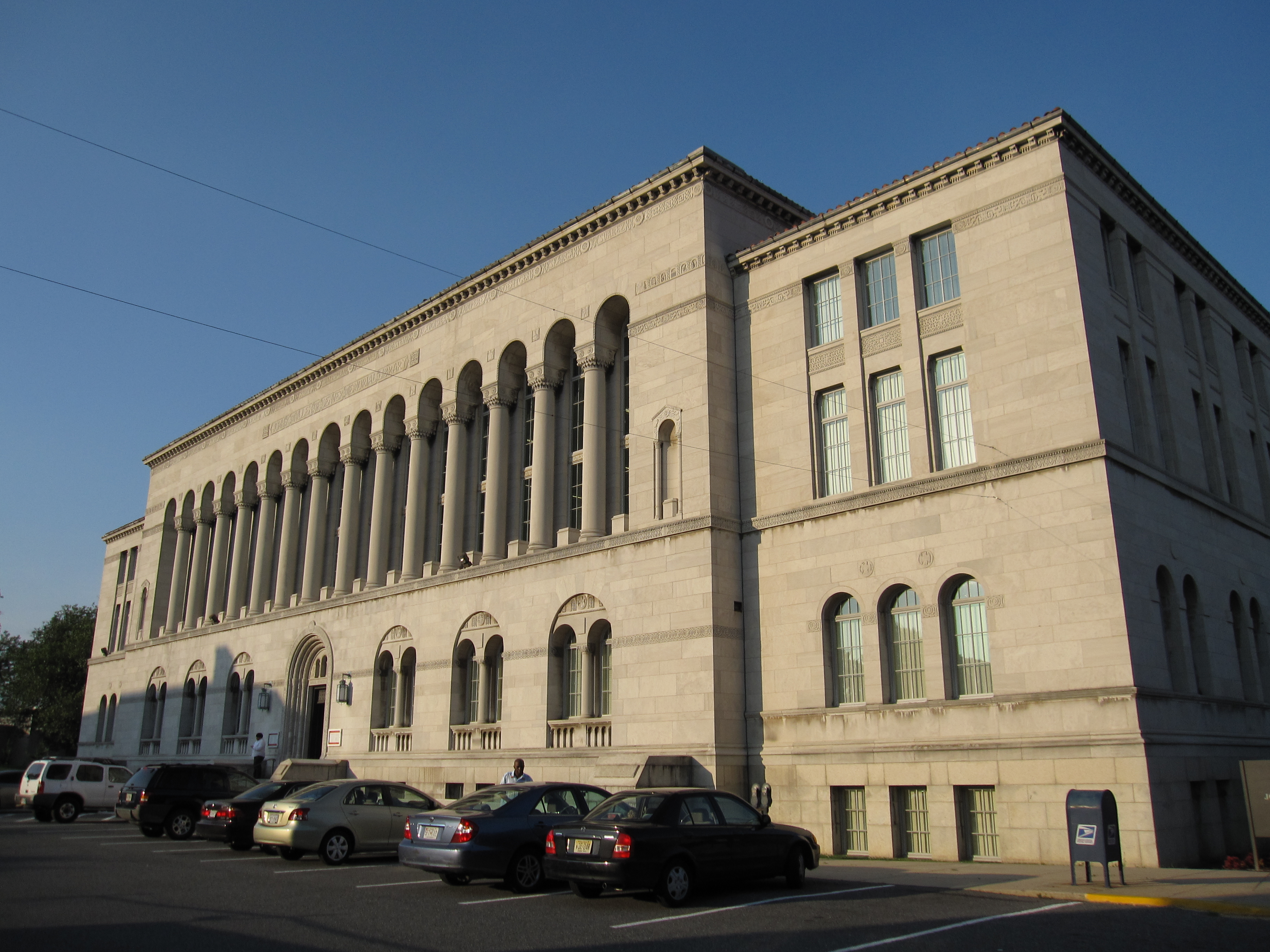
The Mullen of Denver Memorial Library of the Catholic University of America, completed in 1928.

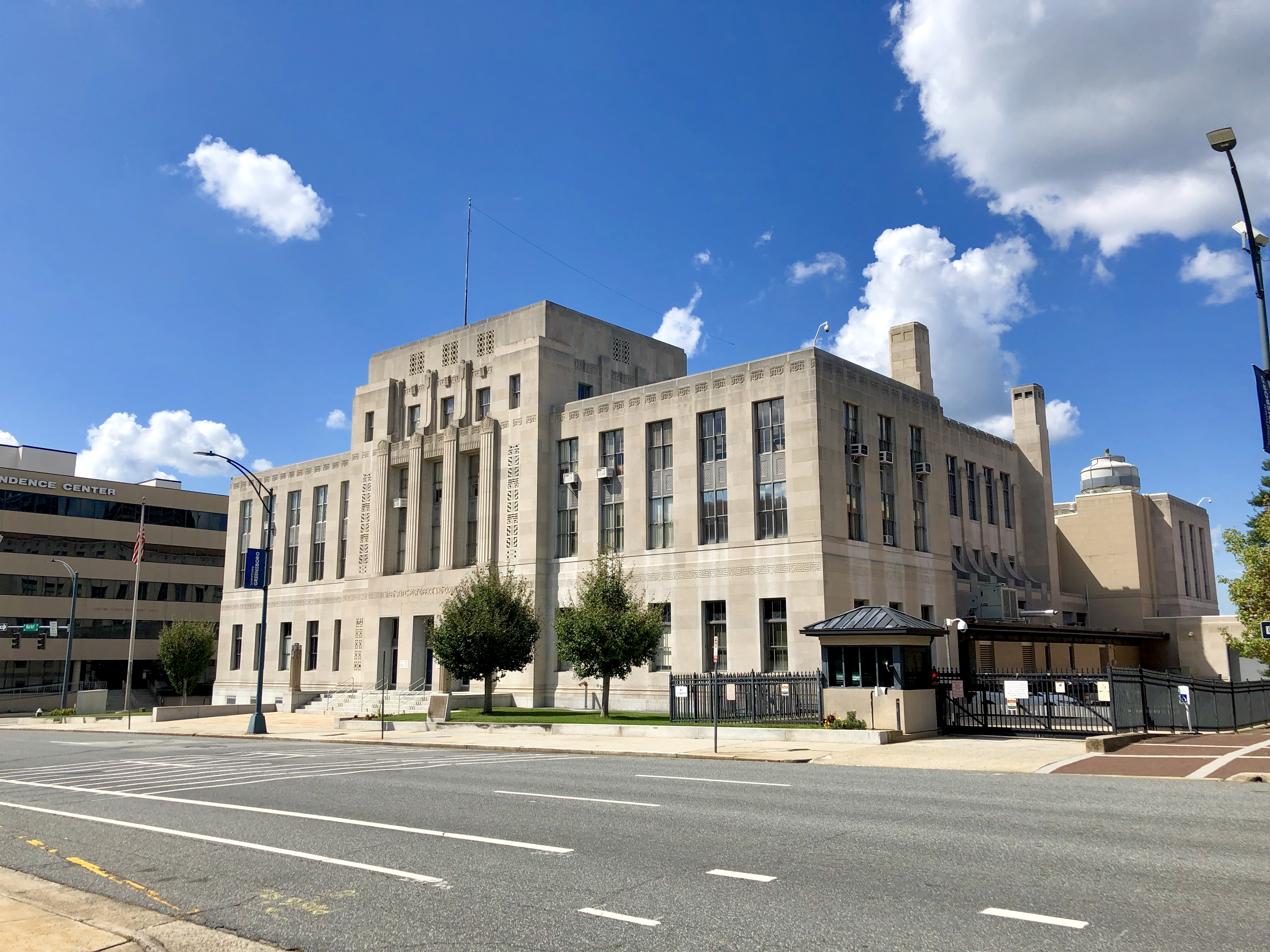
The L. Richardson Preyer Federal Building in Greensboro, North Carolina, completed in 1933.

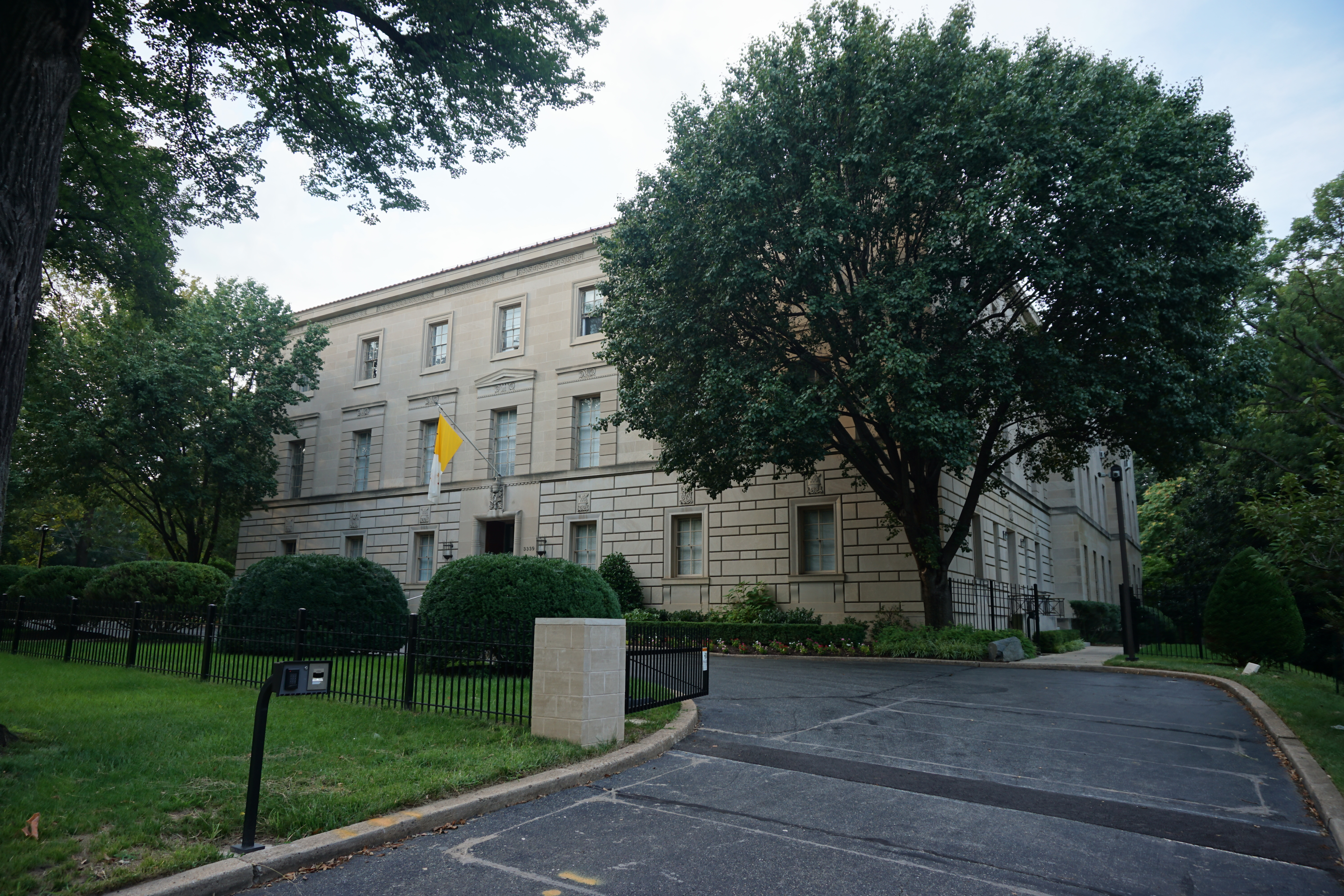
The Apostolic Nunciature to the United States in Washington, D.C., completed in 1937.

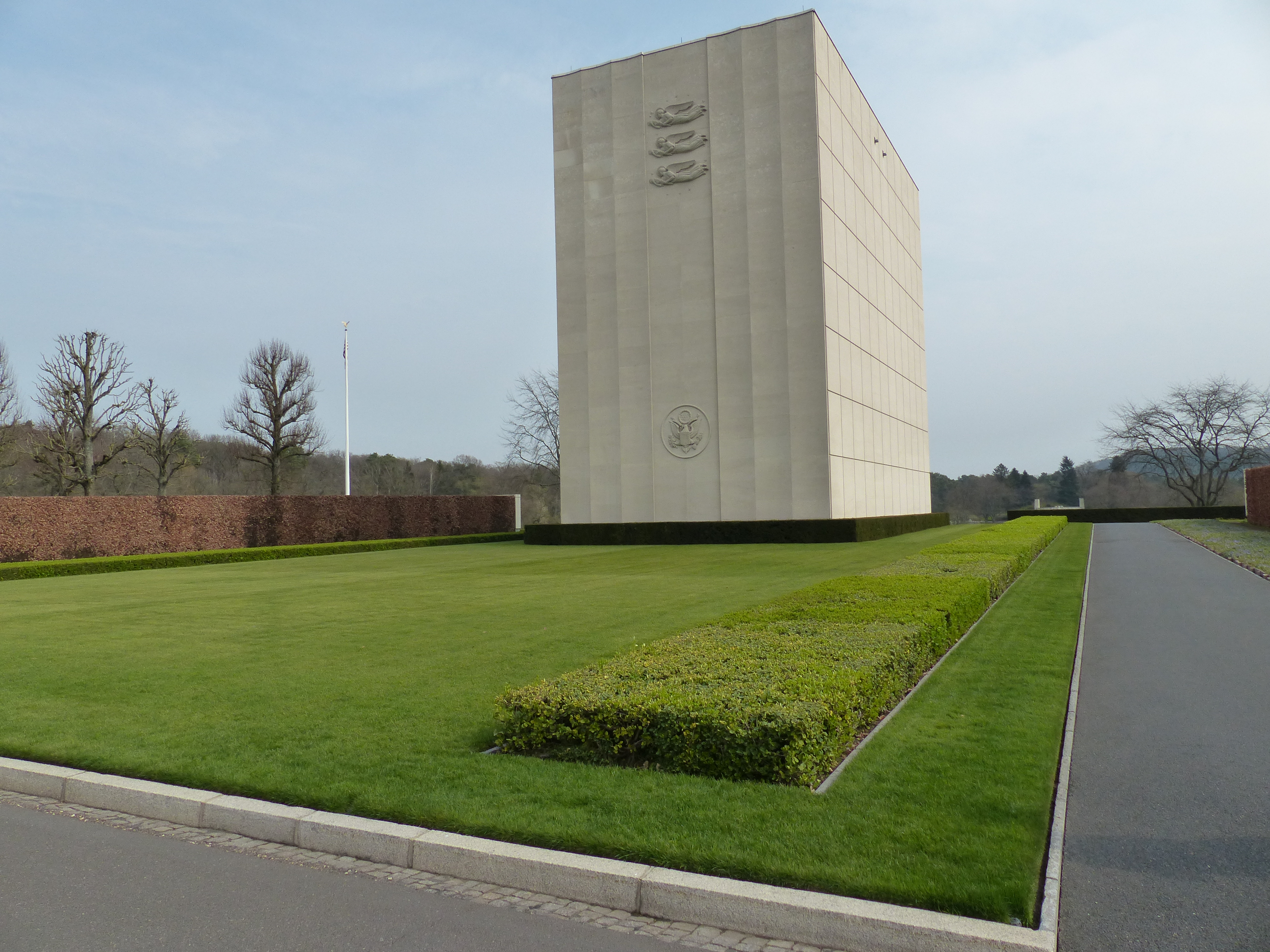
Memorial chapel of the Lorraine American Cemetery and Memorial, completed posthumously in 1960.

Frederick V. Murphy FAIA (February 16, 1879 – May 4, 1958) was an American architect and architectural educator. He was in practice in Washington, D.C. from 1911 to 1954. He was best known for his work for the Catholic church and as the founder and director of the Catholic University School of Architecture and Planning from 1911 to 1949.

== Professional and academic career ==
Frederick Vernon Murphy was born February 16, 1879, in Fond du Lac, Wisconsin to John Vernon Murphy and Alice (McCue) Murphy. In the 1880s the family moved to Chicago, where Murphy attended the public schools, graduating from North Division High School in 1897. He received further instruction at the School of the Art Institute of Chicago and the former Chicago Athenæum before being appointed as teacher of freehand drawing in the Chicago schools. In 1899 he moved to Washington, D.C., where he joined the staff of the Supervising Architect of the Treasury. In 1905 he was awarded the traveling scholarship of the Washington Architectural Club, which enabled him to travel extensively in Europe. While in Paris Murphy took the entrance examinations of the École des Beaux-Arts, and was admitted to the school. In 1909 he was awarded a diplôme and he returned to the Supervising Architect in Washington.

In 1911 Murphy and a colleague, Walter B. Olmsted, left the Supervising Architect to open their own firm, Murphy & Olmsted. They quickly gained a reputation as architects of buildings for the Catholic church. They designed numerous parish churches, buildings for Catholic University and the building of the Apostolic Nunciature to the United States and were associate architects with Maginnis & Walsh of the Basilica of the National Shrine of the Immaculate Conception. Their connections to the Supervising Architect led to several commissions for federal buildings during the first years of the Great Depression, including the United States Post Office in Wellsville, New York and the L. Richardson Preyer Federal Building in Greensboro, North Carolina, both completed in 1933. In the 1930s Olmsted's health declined, and he gradually withdrew from practice. He died in 1937. In 1940 Murphy formed a new partnership, Murphy & Locraft, with Thomas H. Locraft. They remained associated until Murphy retired from practice in 1954. Late works of Murphy's career include the Lorraine American Cemetery and Memorial in France, completed posthumously in 1960. Locraft continued the practice as Murphy & Locraft until 1957 and thereafter as Thomas H. Locraft Associates. Locraft died in 1959.

In 1911, while he was forming his architectural practice, Murphy was appointed professor of architecture of the Catholic University of America and organized what is now the Catholic University School of Architecture and Allied Arts. Initially its sole instructor, he headed the department until 1949, when he was succeeded by Locraft, his business partner and former student.

== Public service and honors ==
As a graduate of the Beaux-Arts, Murphy joined the French Société des Architectes Diplômés par le Gouvernement in 1910 and later the American Society of Beaux-Arts Architects. He joined the American Institute of Architects in 1920 as a member of the Washington chapter, and was elected a Fellow in 1931. In 1945 he was appointed to the United States Commission of Fine Arts by Harry S. Truman, and was the first Washington architect to sit on the commission. He served until 1950. In 1951 he was elected an associate of the National Academy of Design.

In 1926 Murphy was made a Chevalier of the Legion of Honor by the French government and in 1939 he was appointed a knight commander of the Order of St. Gregory the Great by Pope Pius XII.

== Personal life ==
In 1936 Murphy was married to Margery Cannon. They had three children and lived in Chevy Chase, Maryland. Murphy died May 4, 1958, at home at the age of 79.

== Architectural works ==
- Gibbons Hall, Catholic University of America, Washington, D.C. (1911)
- Father O'Connell Hall, Catholic University of America, Washington, D.C. (1914)
- St. Joseph Roman Catholic Church, 711 N Columbus St, Alexandria, Virginia (1915–16)
- Maloney Hall, Catholic University of America, Washington, D.C. (1917)
- Basilica of the National Shrine of the Immaculate Conception, (Note: As associate architect with Maginnis & Walsh.) 400 Michigan Ave NE, Washington, D.C. (1920–59)
- Shrine of the Sacred Heart, 3211 Sacred Heart Way NW, Washington, D.C. (1921–22)
- Holy Family Roman Catholic Church, (Note: As associate architect with W. Lawrence Jaekle.) 140 S Findlay St, Dayton, Ohio (1924–25)
- John K. Mullen of Denver Memorial Library, Catholic University of America, Washington, D.C. (1925–28)
- St. Francis de Sales Roman Catholic Church, (Note: As associate architect with George J. Dietel.) 407 Northland Ave, Buffalo, New York (1926–28)
- St. Mary's Roman Catholic Church, 1458 Old Shell Rd, Mobile, Alabama (1926–28)
- L. Richardson Preyer Federal Building, 324 W Market St, Greensboro, North Carolina (1931–33, NRHP 2014)
- United States Post Office, 40 E Pearl St, Wellsville, New York (1931–33, NRHP 1989)
- Apostolic Nunciature to the United States, 3339 Massachusetts Ave, Washington, D.C. (1937)
- Church of St. Dismas, the Good Thief of the Clinton Correctional Facility, Dannemora, New York (1939–41, NRHP 1991))
- St Anthony of Padua Church, 1029 Monroe St NE, Washington, D.C. (1939)
- Iglesia Cristo Rey, Carrera 23b, Manizales, Caldas Department, Colombia (1948–50)
- Archbishop Carroll High School, 4300 Harewood Rd NE, Washington, D.C. (1951–53)
- Lorraine American Cemetery and Memorial, Saint-Avold, Moselle, France (1953–60)
- Marine Memorial Chapel, Marine Corps Base Quantico, Quantico, Virginia (1955–57)
