= John Selby Spence =

John Selby Spence may refer to:

- John S. Spence (1788–1840), American politician
- John Selby Spence (bishop) (1909–1973), auxiliary bishop of the Roman Catholic Archdiocese of Washington
