= John Selby Spence (bishop) =

American bishop

His Excellency, The Most Reverend John Selby Spence
- Auxiliary Bishop of Washington; Titular Bishop of Aggersel
- Church: Roman Catholic Church
- See: Archdiocese of Washington
- Other post: Titular Bishop of Aggersel

Orders
- Ordination: December 5, 1933 by Francesco Marchetti Selvaggiani
- Consecration: May 19, 1964 by Egidio Vagnozzi

Personal details
- Born: May 19, 1909 Baltimore, Maryland, US
- Died: March 7, 1973 (aged 63) Washington, D.C., US
- Education: Pontifical North American College

John Selby Spence (May 19, 1909 – March 7, 1973) was an American prelate of the Roman Catholic Church. He served as titular bishop of Aggersel and auxiliary bishop of the Archdiocese of Washington in the District of Columbia from 1964 until his death in 1973.

== Biography ==
=== Early life ===
John Spence was born in Baltimore, Maryland on May 19, 1909. He attended St. Mary's Seminary in Baltimore, Maryland then went to the Pontifical North American College in Rome.

=== Priesthood ===
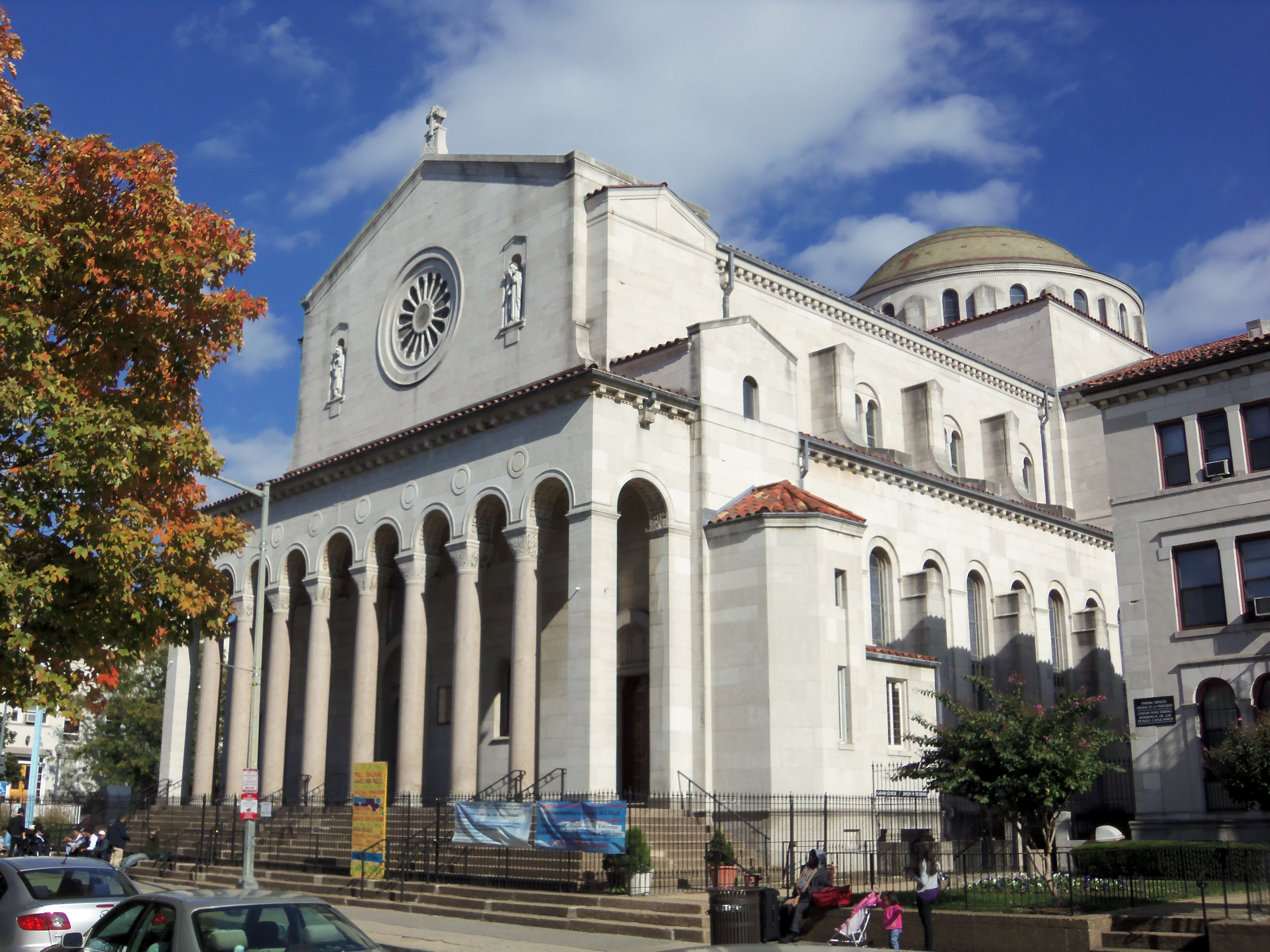
Shrine of the Sacred Heart Church, Washington, D.C. (2013)

Spence was ordained into the priesthood in Rome by Cardinal Francesco Marchetti Selvaggiani to the priesthood on December 5, 1933, for the Archdiocese of Baltimore. Spence was incardinated, or transferred, to the new Archdiocese of Washington when it split from the Archdiocese of Baltimore in 1939. Spence also served as the archdiocesan director of education in 1948. As such, he was tasked by the archbishop with ending racial segregation at all of the archdiocesan schools. Spence was also the founding pastor of St. John the Baptist Parish in Chillum, Maryland, in 1951 and pastor of the Shrine of the Sacred Heart Parish in Washington in 1958.

Spence served as coordinator for the archdiocese for its participation in the 1963 March on Washington, in which Dr. Martin Luther King Jr. gave his famous "I have a dream" speech.

=== Auxiliary Bishop of Washington ===
On March 17, 1964, Pope Paul VI appointed Spence as an auxiliary bishop of Washington and titular bishop of Aggersel; he was consecrated at the Shrine of the Immaculate Conception in Washington by Cardinal Egidio Vagnozzi on May 19, 1964. He remained pastor at Sacred Heart Parish.

=== Death ===
John Spence died in Washington on March 7, 1973, at age 63.
