= Maloney Hall =

Building in Washington, D.C., United States of America

Coordinates: 38°56.025′N 76°59.752′W

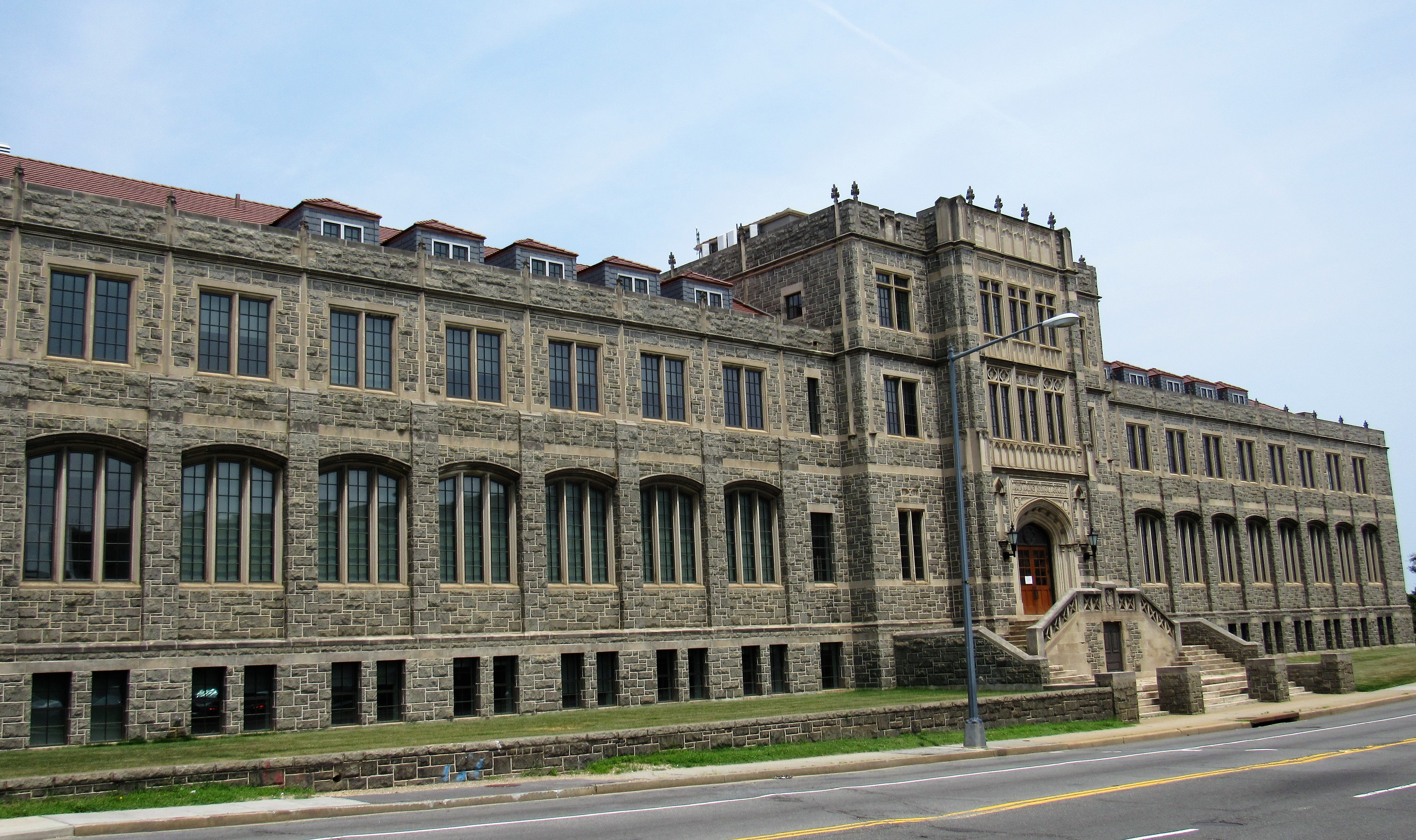
Maloney Hall

Maloney Hall is the home of the Busch School of Business and Economics at the Catholic University of America. It is located in the southeast corner of Catholic University’s main campus, near the Brookland–CUA station. It has been described as "Harvard on the outside, Google on the inside" and "one of the premier academic buildings in Washington, D.C. if not the country."

== History ==
The Martin Maloney Chemical Laboratory was dedicated on November 15, 1917 and named for Martin Maloney, a Philadelphia philanthropist and papal marquis. Maloney gave $120,000 in 1917 to construct the main building and $100,000 in 1923-24 for what is today the 273 seat Della Ratta Auditorium. (Note: The auditorium is named for alumnus and benefactor Joe Della Ratta.) The philanthropist said he hoped the building would "help our Catholic young men and women rise to the level of the great opportunities, which our nation offers them. James A. Farrell, president of the United States Steel Corporation, was a featured speaker at the dedication

The fieldstone Gothic‐style building was designed by architect Frederick V. Murphy who studied at the École nationale supérieure des Beaux-Arts. Upon his return to D.C. from Paris, Murphy introduced himself to the fourth rector of Catholic University, Rev. Thomas Joseph Shahan. The two men, who became great friends, planned the early campus, including Maloney, Father O’Connell, and Gibbons Halls, the John K. Mullen of Denver Memorial Library, and the old gymnasium.

As the lab was opened in Washington D.C. in the midst of World War I, the United States Army took over the lab to conduct chemical research. It was here that the chemical weapon lewisite was initially developed by Winford Lee Lewis.

Maloney Hall underwent renovations and extensions in 1926.

== Busch School ==
=== Renovation ===
In 2016, a $47 million renovation was announced, with a lead gift of $15 million coming from Tim Busch. The renovation turned the building into a "Gothic-chic" home for the Busch School of Business which opened in January 2019. Prior to the renovation, the Busch School took up 25% of McMahon Hall, and the School was scattered throughout six buildings on campus with students taking classes in 10.

The principal architect was Brian Pilot, a Catholic University alumnus, along with his firm, Studios Architecture. Construction was carried out by The Whiting-Turner Contracting Company, and included Chris Saxon, Rachel Hutton, and Nick Carneglia, all of whom are University alumni. It was rededicated in March 2019.

The 61,000 square foot building maintains the original Collegiate Gothic features, but modern updates including tiered case study classrooms modeled after those at Harvard Business School and top business schools around the world. The nine "smart" classrooms are tiered to promote class discussions. The building also features nearly 40 offices, conference rooms, touchdown rooms, and glass-walled study pods for students to use on projects that require teamwork and communication.

=== Saint Michael the Archangel Chapel ===
The 2019 construction also added a chapel dedicated to Saint Michael the Archangel designed by Studio Granda Architects, a Spanish firm. The chapel's original artwork was commissioned by artists in Spain. The stained glass windows feature saints and holy people chosen to serve as inspirations for business students, including Catherine of Alexandria, Enrique Ernesto Shaw, Pier Giorgio Frassati, Margaret Clitherow, Pope Gregory I, Josemaría Escrivá, Elizabeth Ann Seton, Thomas Aquinas, Katherine Drexel, and Maximilian Kolbe.

The altar panel shows Christ in Heaven surrounded by four figures emblematic of the four pillars of Catholic Social Teaching: Saint Matthew the Evangelist representing the common good, Pope John Paul II representing solidarity, Theresa of Calcutta representing human dignity, and Louis Martin and Marie-Azélie Guérin representing subsidiarity. The panel also depicts Pope Leo XIII, the pope who approved the founding of the university. The tabernacle, which is made of marble and gold, is a scale model of the Basilica of the National Shrine of the Immaculate Conception which is nearby on the southwest corner of the campus.

The first mass in the chapel was celebrated by Fr. Louis Maxmillian, O.F.M. Conv., on February 18, 2019. The chapel is the spiritual heart of the building, and the Busch School.

== Works cited ==
- Bahr, Katie (Spring 2019). "Open for Business". Catholic U. The Catholic University of America: 24–33.
