= Shrine of the Sacred Heart =

Shrine of the Sacred Heart Catholic Church
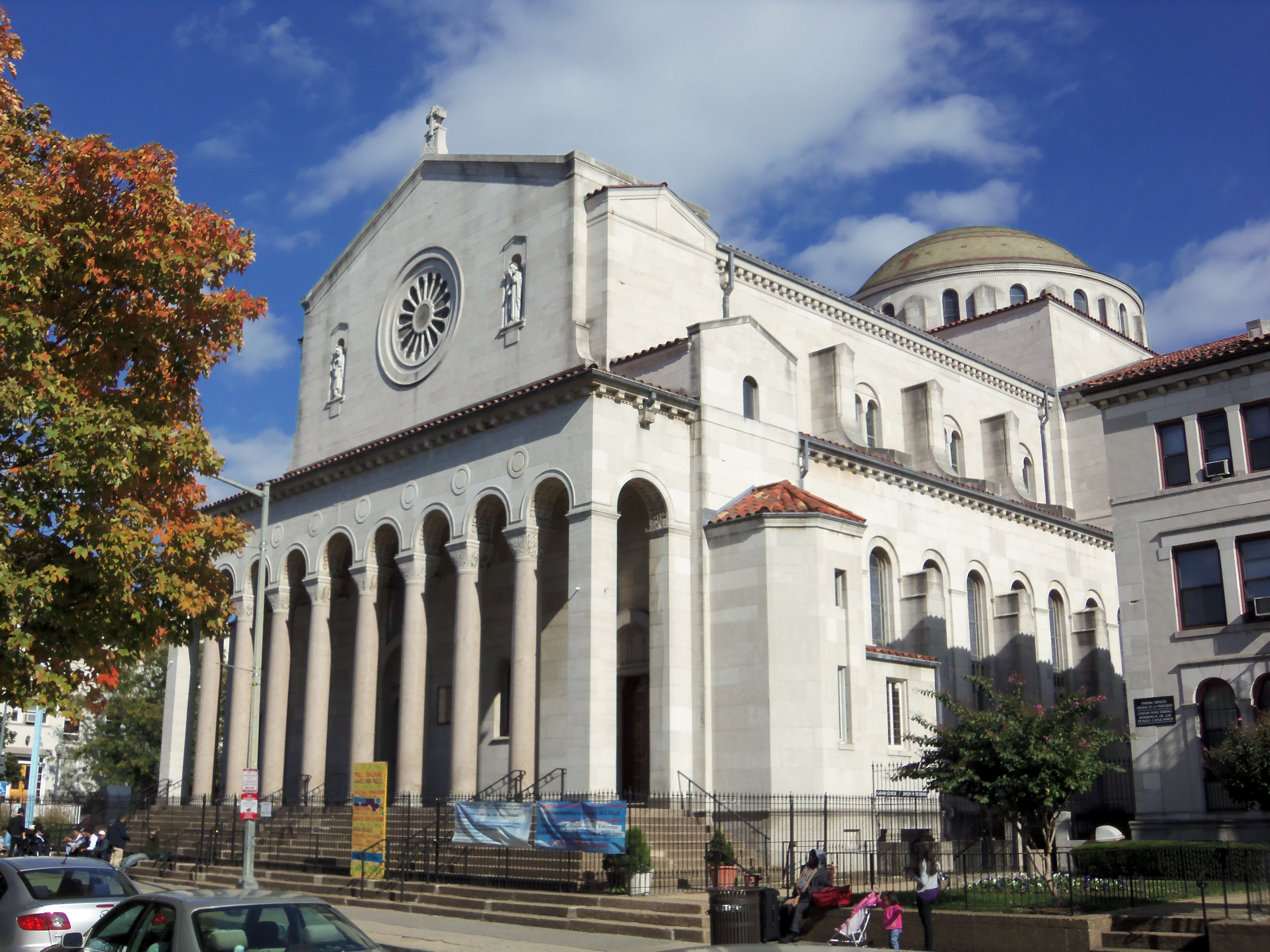
- Shrine of the Sacred Heart Catholic Church
- Shrine of the Sacred Heart Catholic Church
- 38.931175°N 77.035910°W
- Location: 3211 Sacred Heart Way NW, Washington, D.C.
- Country: United States
- Denomination: Catholic

Administration
- Archdiocese: Washington
- Shrine of the Sacred Heart
- U.S. National Register of Historic Places
- NRHP reference No.: 100013249
- Added to NRHP: July 30, 2026

The Shrine of the Sacred Heart is a Catholic parish established in 1899 in the Mount Pleasant/Columbia Heights neighborhood of Washington D.C. The parish church is a large domed Byzantine structure modeled after the Cathedral in Ravenna, Italy.

The current church is actually the second that the Shrine of the Sacred Heart community has called home. The original red brick structure was dedicated in 1901, and the current structure in 1922. Both buildings were influenced by the City Beautiful architectural movement, which overtook Washington from 1901 to 1910. The building was listed on the National Register of Historic Places in 2026.

The parish was originally part of the Archdiocese of Baltimore before the establishment of the Archdiocese of Washington in 1939.

== History ==
Shrine of the Sacred Heart Pastors
| # | Years | Pastor |
| 1 | 1899–1914 | Father Joseph McGee |
| 2 | 1914–1937 | Monsignor Patrick C. Gavan |
| 3 | 1938–1948 | Monsignor James A. Smyth |
| 4 | 1948–1958 | Monsignor E. Jerome Winter |
| 5 | 1958–1970 | Monsignor John S. Spence (Bishop, 1964) |
| 6 | 1970–1973 | Monsignor Martin W. Christopher |
| 7 | 1973–1976 | Father Joseph A. Ranieri (later Monsignior) |
| 8 | 1976-1984 | Father Joaqin A. Bazan (later Monsignior) |
| 9 | 1984–1990 | Father Roman Rozacheson, OFM Cap |
| 10 | 1990–1995 | Father Robert E. McCreary, OFM Cap |
| 11 | 1995–2001 | Father Francis Xavier Russo, OFM Cap |
| 12 | 2001–2010 | Father Stephen Carter, OFM Cap |
| 13 | 2010–2018 | Father Moises Villalta, OFM Cap |
| 14 | 2019–2026 | Father Emilio Biosca Agüero, OFM Cap (later Bishop in 2026) |
| 15 | 2026 – Present | Father Anthony Baetzold, OFM Cap |

The church is located at 3211 Sacred Heart Way (formerly Pine Street, NW), nestled in between the Mt. Pleasant and Columbia Heights regions of the District of Columbia, just off 16th Street Northwest, for a long time a de facto dividing line in the tensely racially divided Washington in the decades after the city's 1968 riots.

The original parish church was located at the corner of 14th Street and Park Road, Northwest (current site of the Tivoli Theater), and the current church was established in the 1920s. The building was designed by the architectural firm of Murphy & Olmsted, and the architectural sculptor was John Joseph Earley. Incorporated into the design is Earley's innovative technique of beautifying concrete by infusing the mixture with fragmented quartz stones, then scraping away the surface of the concrete during drying to further expose the stones as the concrete sets. The same technique can be seen in Earley's work at Meridian Hill Park, a half-mile south. This technique is today known as the Mo-Sai Technique.

Local tradition holds that the church was built on a spur off 16th Street because the artery was home to many mainline Protestant churches, whose leaders objected to a Catholic church joining them on 16th Street, long the home of high-profile religious institutions in Washington. Locals also pass on a similar as-yet-unverified story for the mansion and property next door to the church, which houses a branch of the DC Department of Recreation, supposedly because a previous owner donated it to the city out of a fear that it would eventually fall into Catholic hands if it was sold to another private owner.

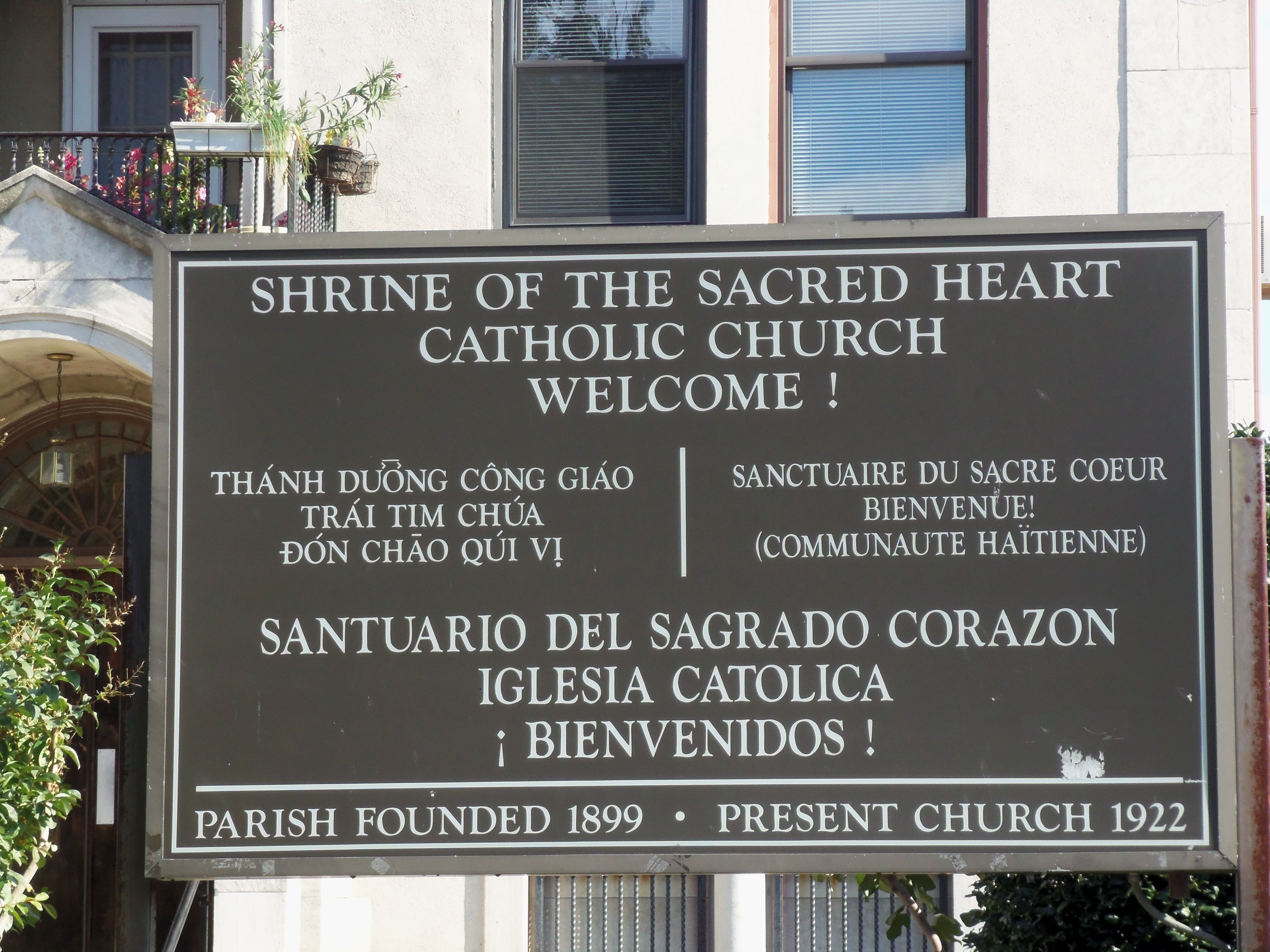
Sacred Heart's multilingual sign

Though the church was built by wealthy patrons, who reportedly raised the funds in three weeks, it is now spiritual home to many lower-income immigrant families, largely Latin American, with a particular concentration of Salvadoran-Americans. The parish regularly celebrates Mass in Spanish, Portuguese, English, Haitian Creole, and Vietnamese. For vigil Masses on Holy Thursday, Easter, and Christmas, the church encourages all communities to celebrate together and the vigil Mass is said in four languages.

The church is administered by priests of the Franciscan Capuchin Order. The current pastor is Fr. Emilio Biosca Agüero, OFM Cap. In July 2010, Fr. Stephen Carter announced that he would be succeeded as pastor by Fr. Moises, and upon his installation, Villalta became the first Salvadoran-American pastor in the history of the diocese.

Among clergy who have served the parish is the late Deacon James W. Quander, who was in the first class of permanent deacons in the Archdiocese of Washington (or anywhere). He was also one of the longest-living juvenile diabetics in the nation.. The disease, also known as Type 1 diabetes, was diagnosed when he was 5. In 1925, he was among the first to use insulin. Deacon and Mrs. Quander's children were the first African-American students admitted to Sacred Heart School.

== Culture ==
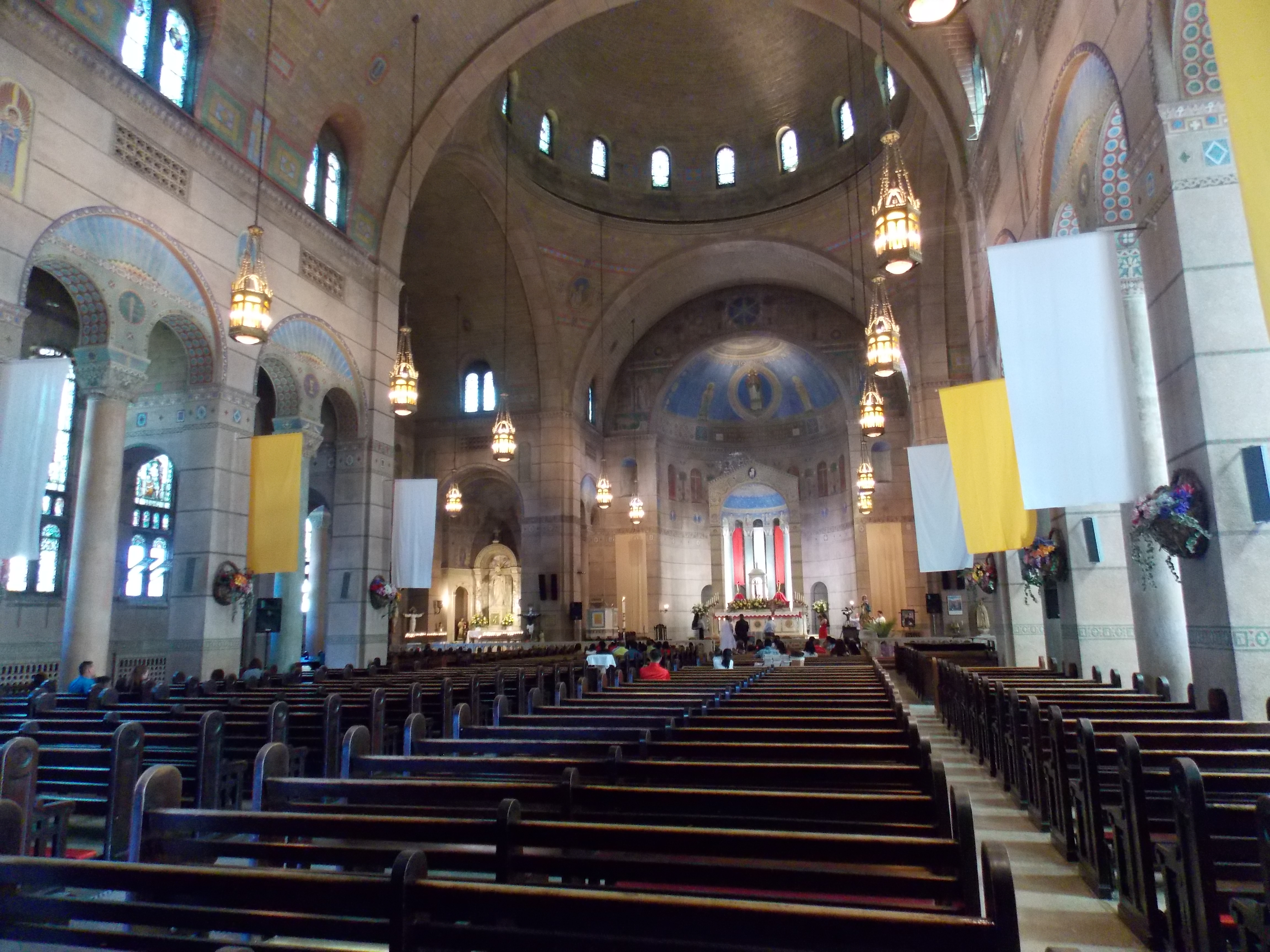
Interior of the shrine

The parish has a long history of social justice ministry, and has been the frequent host of the District's labor Mass on the Feast of St. Joseph the Worker, as well as the home of the Hermano Pedro homeless outreach program and the Shrine of the Sacred Heart Dinner Program, and is affiliated with local social service organizations such as the Spanish Catholic Center and Neighbors Consejo. The parish houses large devotions to Our Lady of Guadalupe (Sacred Heart hosts her feast day December 12 for the entire archdiocese) and Saint Óscar Romero, the martyred Archbishop of San Salvador, though the movement to beatify and possibly canonize Romero appeared stalled until May 2013, when the postulator for his case announced that it was "unblocked." Romero was subsequently canonized in October 2018.

Several dozen flags hang from the church's choir loft, representing the nations of birth and ancestry for the diverse congregation.

== Sacred Heart School ==
The church has a parish school in nearby Mount Pleasant, though it no longer retains full control of the PK-to-8 institution. For most of its history, the school was staffed by the Sinsinawa Dominican Sisters, before gradually evolving into a school staffed by laypersons, like many Catholic schools in the late twentieth century. Among its most famous alums was actress Helen Hayes, widely known as the "First Lady of American Theater."

In the late 1990s, the church realized it could no longer adequately finance the school, a fate shared by several inner-city Washington parishes, despite the continued popularity of Catholic education in a city in need of alternatives to a struggling public school system. In 1997, then-archbishop James Cardinal Hickey established the Center City Consortium, subsidizing these schools from a general archdiocese fund, pooling their resources, and sharing their costs. The archdiocese has direct fiscal oversight over these schools. Sacred Heart's priests still minister to the school spiritually. The Sacred Heart School continues to receive praise and honors, even as several of these Consortium schools continue to be threatened. It is one a very few United States Catholic parish schools operating with a bilingual curriculum.
