= Saint Joseph Catholic Church (Alexandria, Virginia) =

Historic church in Virginia, US

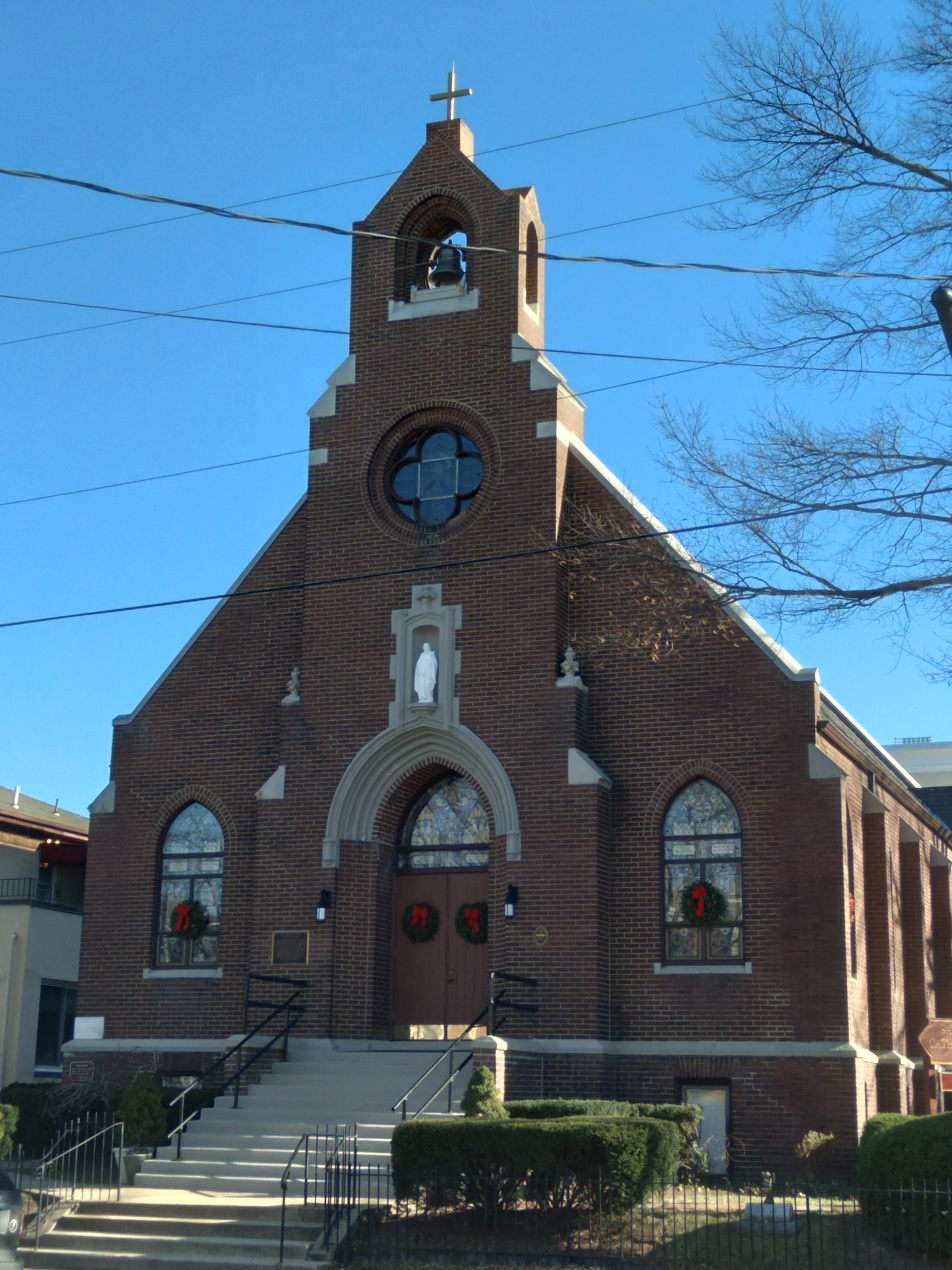
- Saint Joseph Catholic Church, in Old Town, Alexandria, Virginia

- Location in Virginia Location in United States
- 38°48′43.81″N 77°2′47.14″W
- Location: Alexandria, Virginia
- Address: 711 N Columbus St
- Country: United States
- Religious institute: Society of St. Joseph of the Sacred Heart
- Website: stjosephva.org

History
- Founded: 1916
- Dedication: Saint Joseph
- Dedicated: May 14, 1916

Architecture
- Architect: Murphy & Olmsted
- Architectural type: English Gothic Revival architecture
- Groundbreaking: October 8, 1915

Administration
- Diocese: Arlington

Clergy
- Bishop: Michael F. Burbidge
- Priest: Donald M. Fest

Saint Joseph Catholic Church is a predominantly Black Catholic church located at 711 N. Columbus St in historic Old Town Alexandria, Virginia. It was founded in 1916 to provide African-American parishioners of the local St. Mary's Roman Catholic Parish with their own church, freed from the customary restrictions that segregation imposed on them.

Spurred on by Thomas Blair, the Black sexton and sacristan of St. Mary for over thirty years, a lot in the Black neighborhood of ‘Uptown’ was acquired in 1914. (Note: For more on the historic Black neighborhoods of Alexandria, see Courageous Journey, page 16ff.) Groundbreaking for the new Saint Joseph Catholic Church followed the next year, and the brick gothic revival church was dedicated in 1916.

The first priest appointed to the new parish was Rev. Joseph J. Kelly of the Josephites, a mission society founded following the Civil War with a special apostolate in ministry to Black and Native American Catholics. The church Saint Joseph became known as the “colored church” among Alexandrian Catholics until 1969, when it was designated as a territorial parish.

The church continues to cultivate its Black heritage as a proud aspect of its cultural history and is the only Black Catholic parish in the diocese. It remains associated with the Josephites to this day.

Saint Joseph Catholic was the last of nine historic Black churches founded in Alexandria between the Civil War and the First World War. (Note: The Black churches founded during and after the Civil War include Beulah Baptist, 1863; Zion Baptist, 1864; Shiloh Baptist, around 1863; Third Baptist Church, 1865; Meade Memorial, 1869; Ebenezer Baptist, 1881; Good Shepard Episcopal Chapel, 1883; Mt. Jezreel, 1890; and Oakland Baptist, 1891. Two other Black churches had been founded in Alexandria before the Civil War. Alfred Street Baptist Church dates from 1806. Roberts Memorial United Methodist Church dates from 1834.) The church was added to the National Register of Historic Places in 2004. It is a contributing property in the Uptown–Parker–Gray Historic District, listed on the National Register of Historic Places in 2010.

== History ==
African-American parishioners had been documented in the parish records of St. Mary’s Catholic Church in its earliest years 1795 – 1815. Many of these first Black Catholics were enslaved by wealthy Catholic landowners who crossed the Potomac from Maryland to attend mass at St. Mary’s. Along with their names, the parish records included notations for free or enslaved. In accordance with the established rules of contemporary racial division, Black Catholics at St. Mary’s had their own classes, their own catechism, and their own seating area separated from the white congregation.

During the Civil War, Alexandria's population swelled with contrabands who also worshipped at St. Mary's. After the Civil War, Jim Crow laws continued to restrict the rights of African-Americans. Black Catholics sat in the north wing during services, separate from the white congregation at St. Mary's. They had their own religious education classes, and were married by priests in their homes.

By the turn of the 20th century, Black Catholics at St. Mary's were served by their own priest, Rev. Charles Hannigan of the Josephites, a Catholic society whose mission it was to serve the needs of Native and African-American communities. He traveled from Richmond each week to conduct Mass for the Black Catholics of Alexandria.

By 1913, they wanted their own church. Thomas Blair, the African-American sexton of Basilica of St. Mary for over thirty years, convened a committee to explore the possibility of establishing a church. Working with Fr. Hannigan, Mr. Blair held meetings at St. Mary's Lyceum with his fellow parishers and drafted a letter to the Bishop Denis J. O’Connell of Richmond asking to form themselves into a new congregation.

The appeal was approved and, despite the fact that African-Americans were among the poorest of residents of Alexandria, Mr. Blair held a variety of fund-raising activities toward the new parish of St. Joseph Catholic Church. Rev. Hannigan also convinced Katherine Drexel, founder of the Sisters of the Blessed Sacrament and member of a wealthy Philadelphia family, to donate $8,000. In 1914, the committee was able to purchase property in the historically black neighborhood called Uptown, at the northwest corner of Wythe and North Columbus streets.

In 1915, Rev. Joseph J. Kelly, another Josephite, was assigned to the new parish. St. Joseph Catholic Church was dedicated on May 14, 1916. Two weeks later, Mr. Blair, considered the father of St. Joseph Church, died at the age of 65. This dedication marked the formal self-segregation of local African-American Catholics from the Catholic parish of St. Mary’s fifty years after the Civil War.

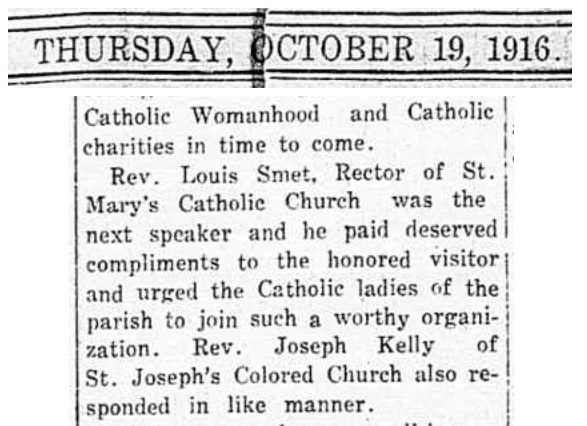

Services were held in the main church and Father Kelly lived in what is now the work sacristy before the church rectory at 709 N. Columbus St. was built in 1921. The parish hall in the basement functioned as a temporary school beginning October 1916. Father Kelly stayed at St. Joseph’s for the next 21 years, providing a solid foundation for this new parish to build upon.

In 1967, Richmond Bishop John J. Russell re-designated St. Joseph's from an African-American mission church to a territorial parish within the Roman Catholic Diocese of Arlington in Virginia. This congregation in Old Town Alexandria remains a vital and inclusive community for Catholics of all races and nationalities.

== School ==
As soon as their church building in the African-American Uptown neighborhood was completed, a school in the lower-level parish hall was opened. Within a few years, St. Joseph's started planning for a separate parochial school building for neighborhood children. A new four-room school building at 721 N. Columbus Street was dedicated in 1931, just 15 years after the dedication of their church. Teachers for the school were African American nuns from the Oblate Sisters of Providence, who commuted daily from their home in Washington, DC. The Oblate Sisters taught and staffed St. Joseph School until it closed in 1969.

== Building ==
The church building was designed by Murphy & Olmsted, Architects. The choice to build within the boundary of the Uptown/Parker-Gray area, like the decisions of other institutions in the same era, is an indication that the neighborhood was quickly becoming the center of the city’s African American community.
