= Millennium North =

Coordinates: 38.93858°N 76.99737°W

Millennium North is a dormitory and one of 10 housing options for students at The Catholic University of America. Built in 2001, it offers suite- and apartment-style options. With Millennium South, it houses 350 upperclassmen.
