= United States Post Office (Wellsville, New York) =

- US Post Office-Wellsville
- U.S. National Register of Historic Places
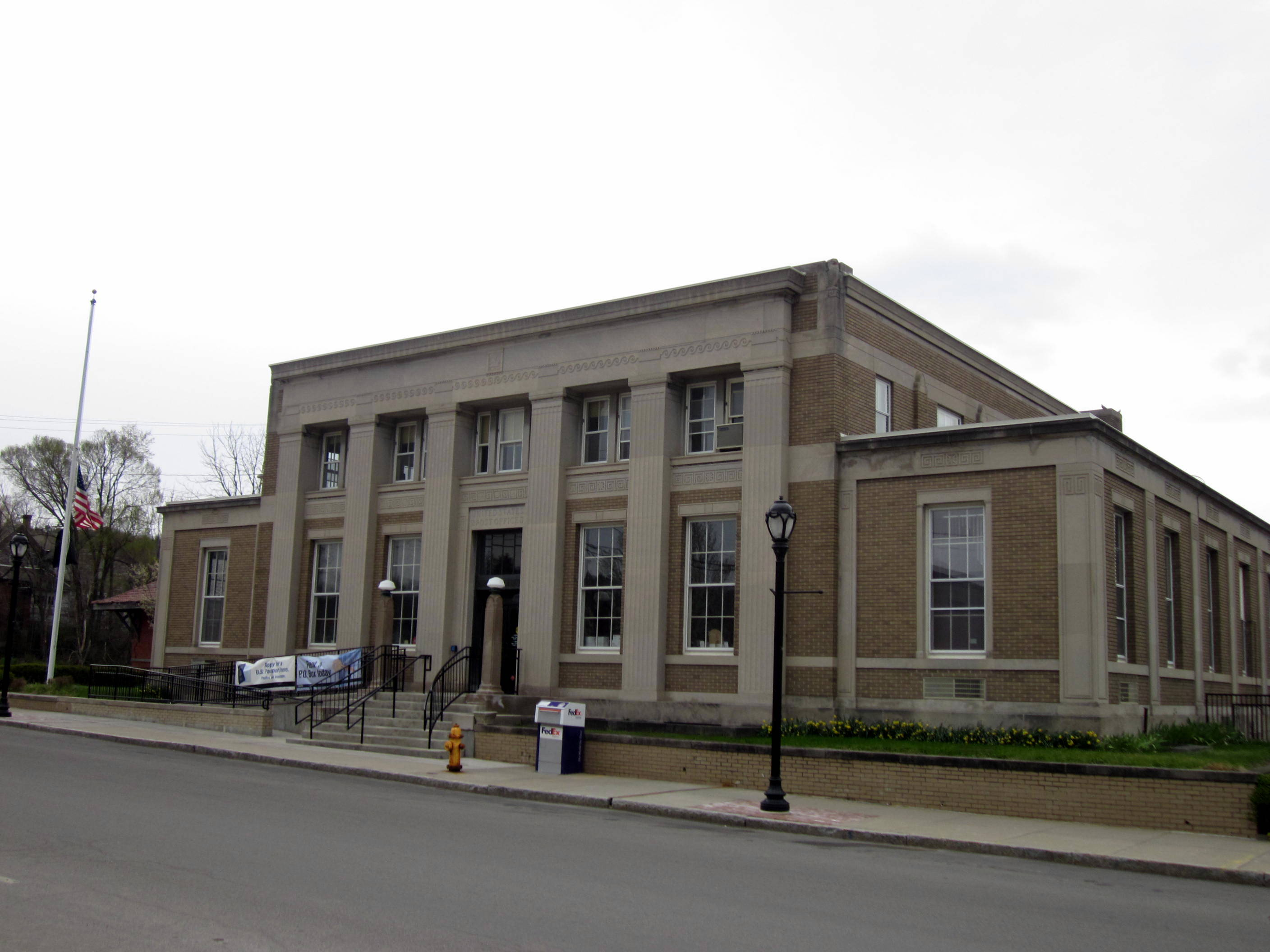
- U.S. Post Office Wellsville, New York, April 2012

- Location within New York Location within the United States
- Location: 40 E. Pearl St., Wellsville, New York
- Coordinates: 42°7′24″N 77°56′56″W
- Area: less than one acre
- Built: 1931
- Architect: Murphy & Olmsted
- Architectural style: Classical Revival
- MPS: US Post Offices in New York State, 1858-1943, TR
- NRHP reference No.: 88002445
- Added to NRHP: May 11, 1989

US Post Office-Wellsville is a historic post office building located at Wellsville in Allegany County, New York. It was designed and built in 1931–1933. It is one of a number of post offices in New York State designed by consulting architects Murphy & Olmsted to the Office of the Supervising Architect of the Treasury Department. It is a two-story, brick clad structure on a limestone clad foundation with two one-story wings. The structure is in the Classical Revival style. The interior includes two bas relief panels; one depicting the first League of Peace of the Iroquois tribes and the second depicting Mary Jemison, "White Woman of the Genesee." It is located across from Wellsville Erie Depot.

It was listed on the National Register of Historic Places in 1989.
