= St. Francis de Sales Roman Catholic Church (Buffalo, New York) =

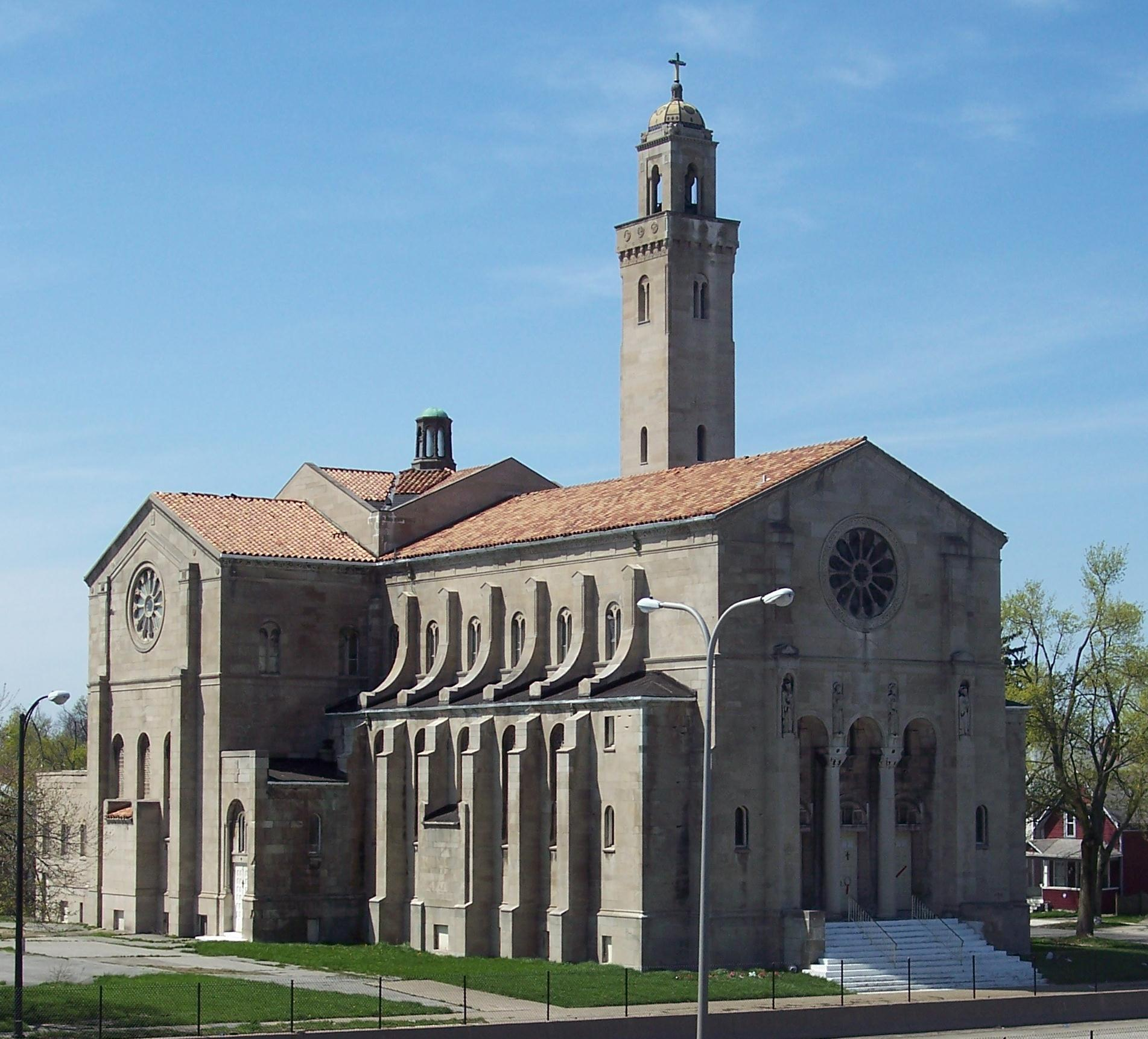
- St. Francis de Sales Roman Catholic Church
- 42.9191578°N 78.844516°W
- Location: 407 Northland Ave, Buffalo, New York
- Country: United States
- Denomination: Roman Catholic

History
- Status: Parish church
- Founded: May, 1912
- Dedicated: April, 1928
- Consecrated: 1926

Architecture
- Functional status: "Unused"
- Architect(s): Murphy & Olmsted; George J. Dietel
- Style: Romanesque
- Completed: April 15, 1928
- Construction cost: US$400 thousand
- Closed: 1993

Specifications
- Capacity: 900
- Height: 140 feet (42.7 m)
- Materials: Indiana limestone

Saint Francis de Sales Roman Catholic Church is located at 407 Northland Ave, in Buffalo, New York. The Italian Romanesque Revival style church previously served as a parish of the Roman Catholic Diocese of Buffalo. The church was closed by the Roman Catholic Diocese in 1993. The church is a Buffalo landmark.

== History ==
This Church was the third to the parish, and was built in response to demand for a larger place of worship. The interior of the church contains a number of mosaics along the wall surfaces. The exterior of the church was built of Indiana limestone, with no structural steel being used in the construction of the building's shell. The church is topped with a Mediterranean tile roof.

While operated by the Roman Catholic Diocese of Buffalo, the church contained a Teller-Kent organ.

== Present day ==
After closing the church, the parish was merged with St. Nicholas Catholic Church. Shortly after, the church building was sold to the Terbernacle Baptist Church. After occupying the building for nearly 10 years, the building fell into disrepair and was abandoned. In 2003, the church was purchased at auction by the Reverend Perry Davis, after having been flipped several times and pillaged. The building itself is deteriorating. The stained-glass windows have been removed and there are areas of roof damage. The old school has been razed. The adjacent rectory is now privately owned.

== Gallery ==
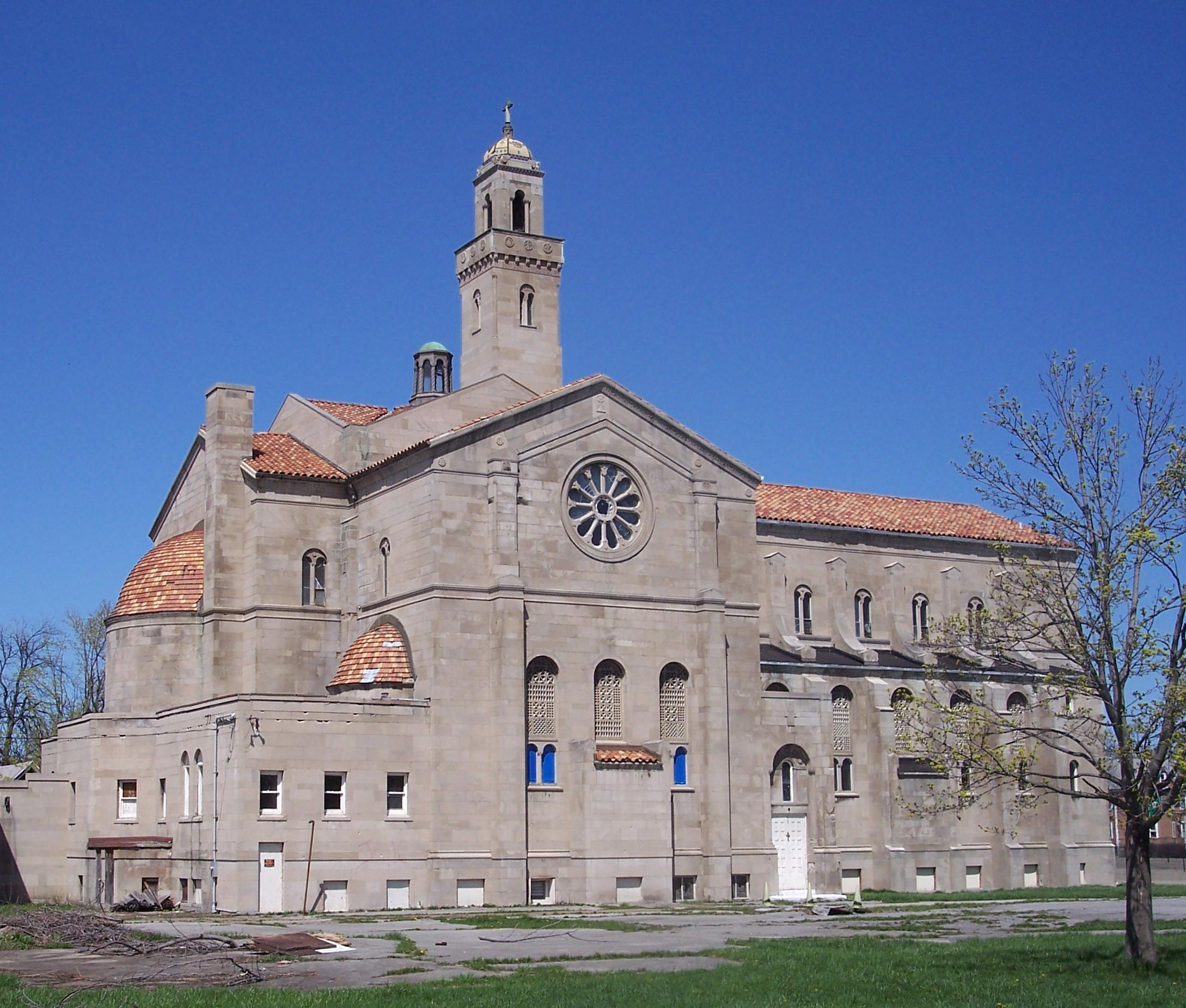
side View

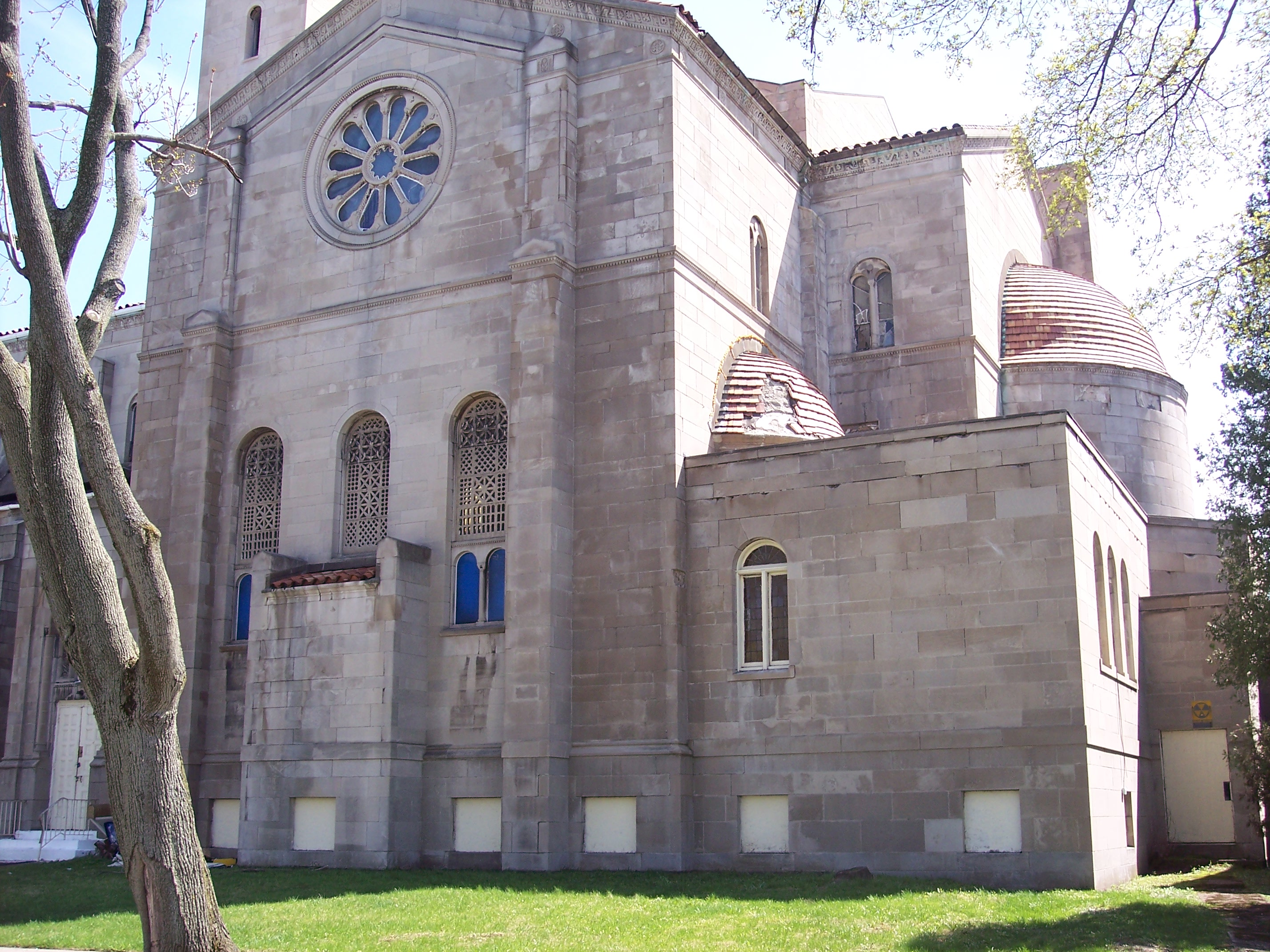
roof and window damage

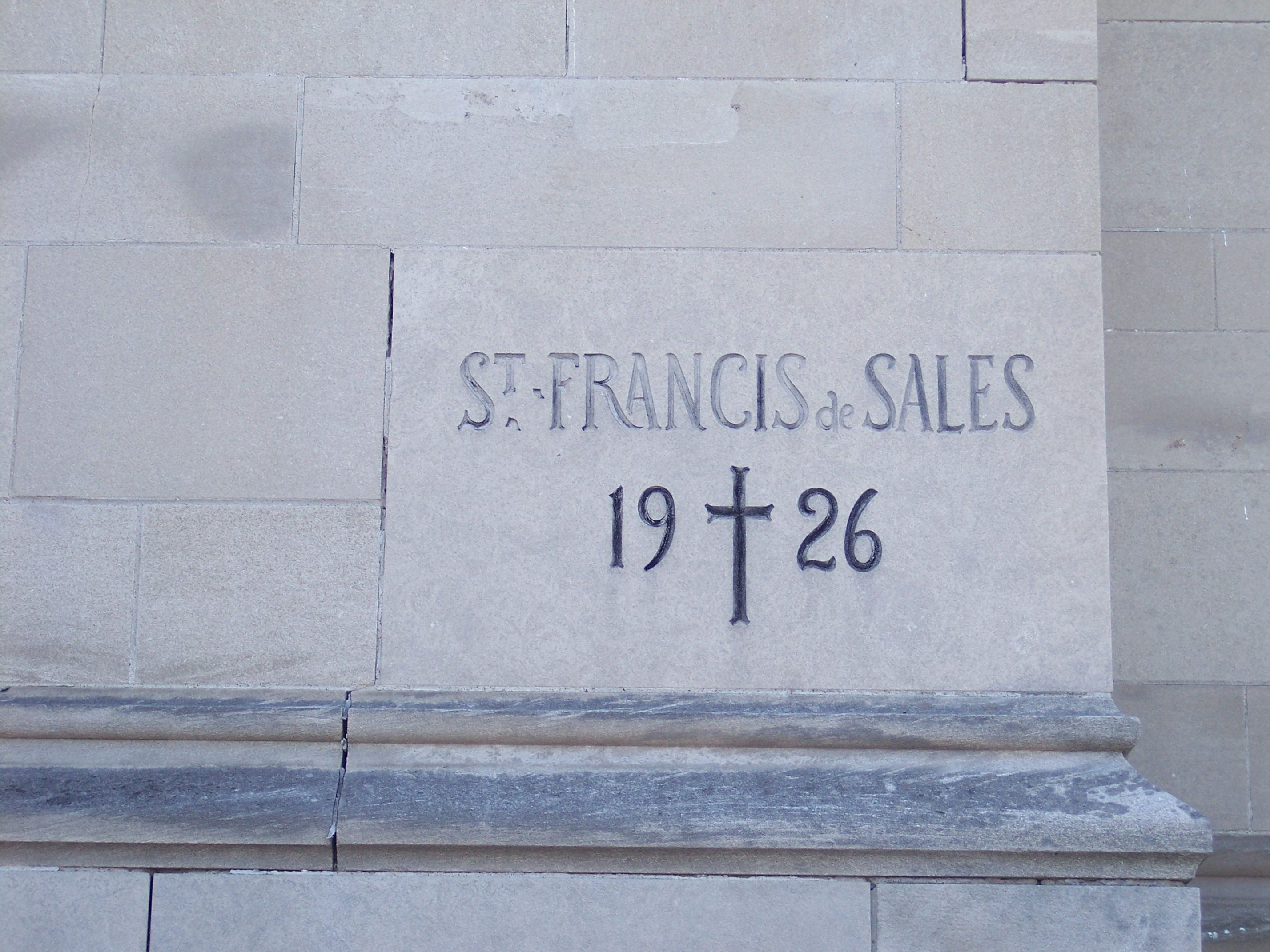
cornerstone

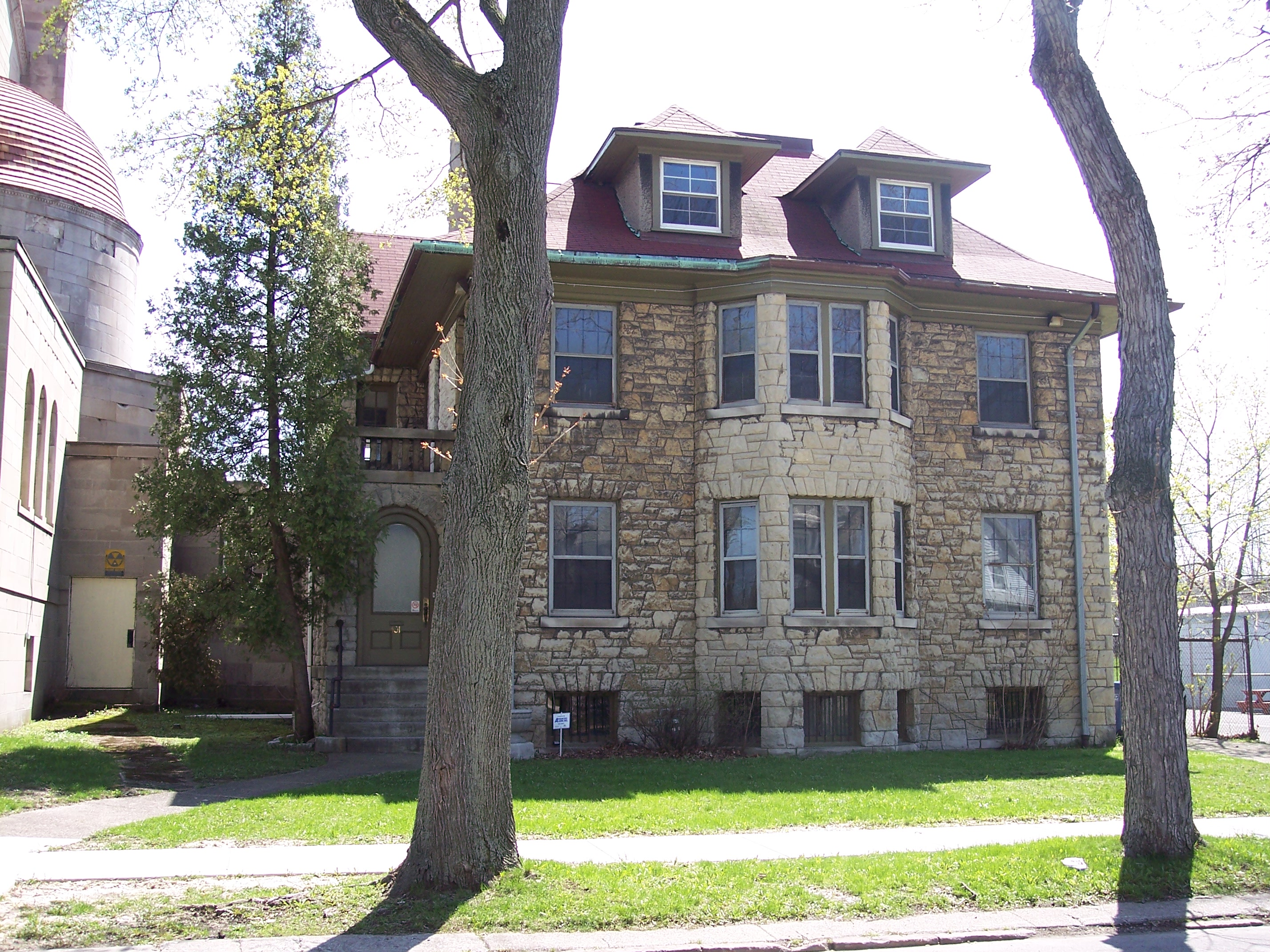
rectory
