= Wellsville station =

Wellsville
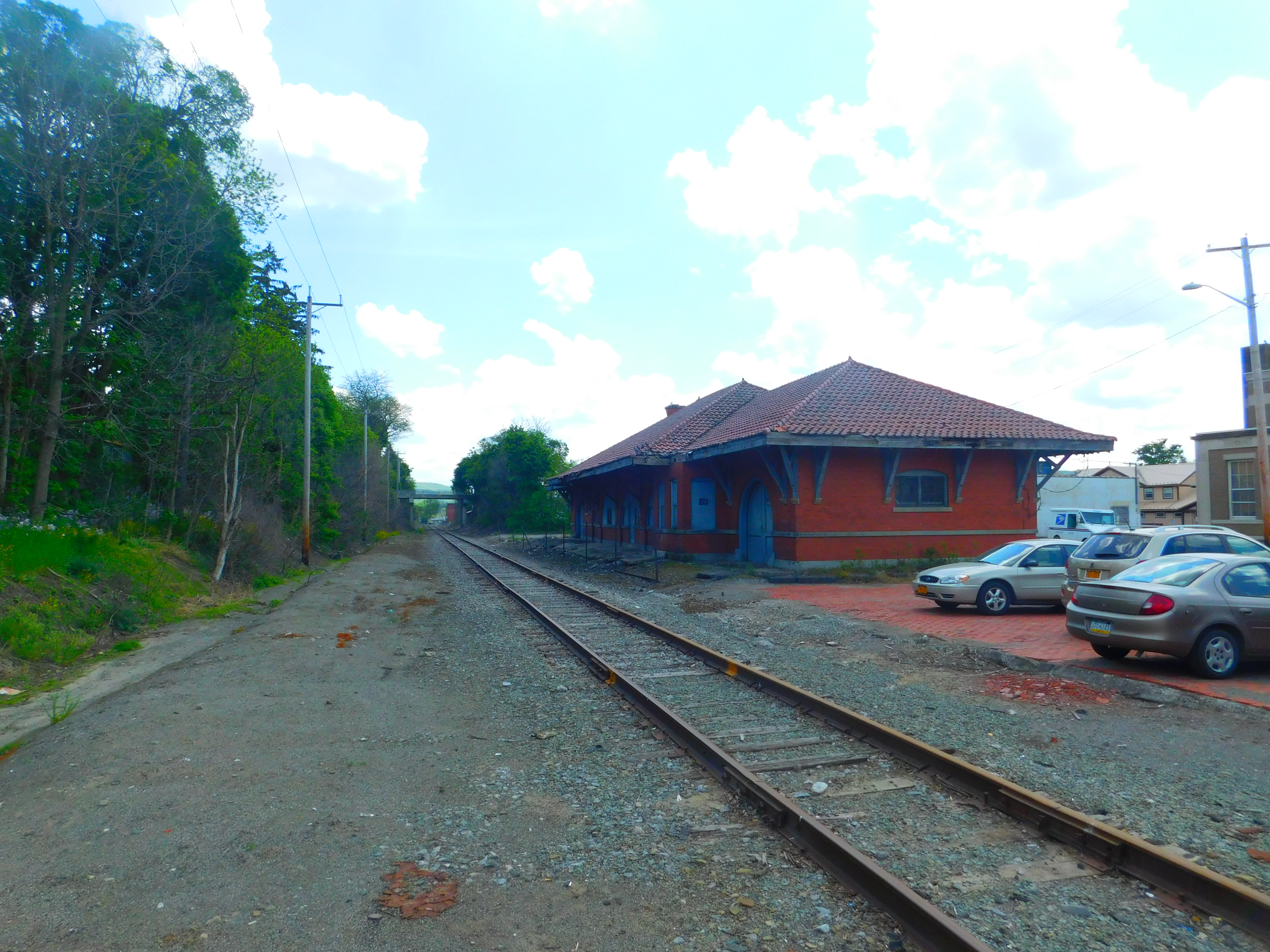
- The Wellsville depot in May 2016.

General information
- Location: 10 Depot Street, Wellsville, New York
- Line: Main Line (Allegany Division)
- Platforms: 1 side platform
- Tracks: 2

Construction
- Platform levels: 1

Other information
- Station code: 4413

History
- Opened: May 14, 1851; 175 years ago
- Closed: January 6, 1970; 56 years ago
- Rebuilt: 1911; 115 years ago

Former services
Preceding station	Erie Railroad	Following station
Scio toward Chicago	Main Line	Andover toward Jersey City
- Wellsville Erie Depot
- U.S. National Register of Historic Places
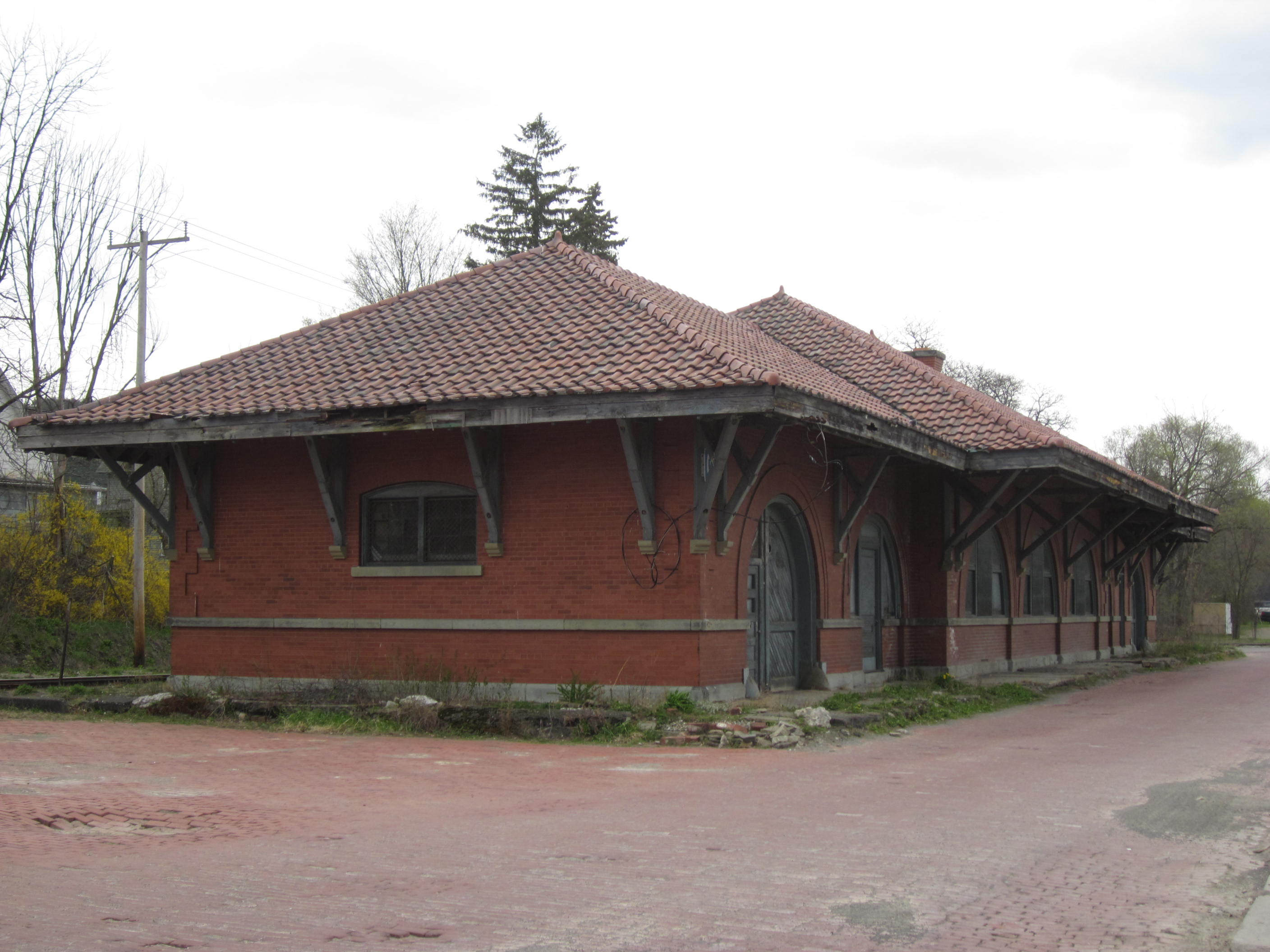
- Wellsville station as seen in April 2012, 101 years after construction of the current depot.

- Location within New York Location within the United States
- Location: Depot St., Wellsville, New York
- Coordinates: 42°7′24″N 77°56′54″W
- Area: less than one acre
- Built: 1911
- Architect: Henry, William
- Architectural style: Queen Anne, Romanesque
- NRHP reference No.: 87001426
- Added to NRHP: August 27, 1987
Location

Wellsville Erie Depot is a historic train station located at Wellsville in Allegany County, New York. It was constructed in 1911, for the Erie Railroad. It is a one-story, 132-foot (40 m) by 33-foot (10 m) structure displaying elements of the Queen Anne and Romanesque Revival styles popular in the late 19th and early 20th century. It is located across the street from the Wellsville Post Office.

Being on the Erie mainline, into the 1960s, the Erie Limited and the Atlantic Express/Pacific Express passenger trains made stops there. The last train making stops there was the Erie Lackawanna's Lake Cities which was discontinued on January 6, 1970.

It was listed on the National Register of Historic Places in 1987.

== See also ==
- List of Erie Railroad structures documented by the Historic American Engineering Record
