= Martin Maloney (philanthropist) =

Philadelphia businessman (1848–1929)

Martin Maloney (November 11, 1848 – May 9, 1929) was a Philadelphia businessman, philanthropist and papal marquis. By the time he was 33 he was regarded as an expert in the process of gas production. He played a role in the development of many Philadelphia gas and light companies.

== Philanthropy ==
Maloney gave $120,000 in 1917 to construct the Maloney Hall at The Catholic University of America and an additional $100,000 in 1923-24 for what is today the building's 273 seat Della Ratta Auditorium. The philanthropist said he hoped the building would "help our Catholic young men and women rise to the level of the great opportunities, which our nation offers them". James A. Farrell, president of the United States Steel Corporation, was a featured speaker at the dedication.

In recognition of his many charitable gifts, he was made a papal marquis in 1902 by Pope Leo XIII. He was made a member of the Papal Household in 1904.

In the 1920s he funded the re-established (suppressed following the French revolution), the Irish Franciscan College - St Anthony's College, Leuven, in Belgium.

== Personal life ==
He was born in Ballingarry, County Tipperary, Ireland, and moved to Scranton, Pennsylvania when he was six years old. Maloney married Margaret Ann Hewiston of Carbondale, Pennsylvania, in 1868. They had seven children, five of whom predeceased Maloney. He had two brothers, Andrew and Thomas. He lived in the Logan Square neighborhood of Philadelphia. His home there, at 220 West Logan Square, was condemned in 1916 and demolished by the city, along with its entire block, when Logan Square was expanded westward to 20th Street as part of the creation of the Benjamin Franklin Parkway. Maloney vacationed in Spring Lake Beach, New Jersey, where he had a home called Ballingarry.
