= St. Anthony of Padua Church (Washington, D.C.) =

St. Anthony of Padua Catholic Church
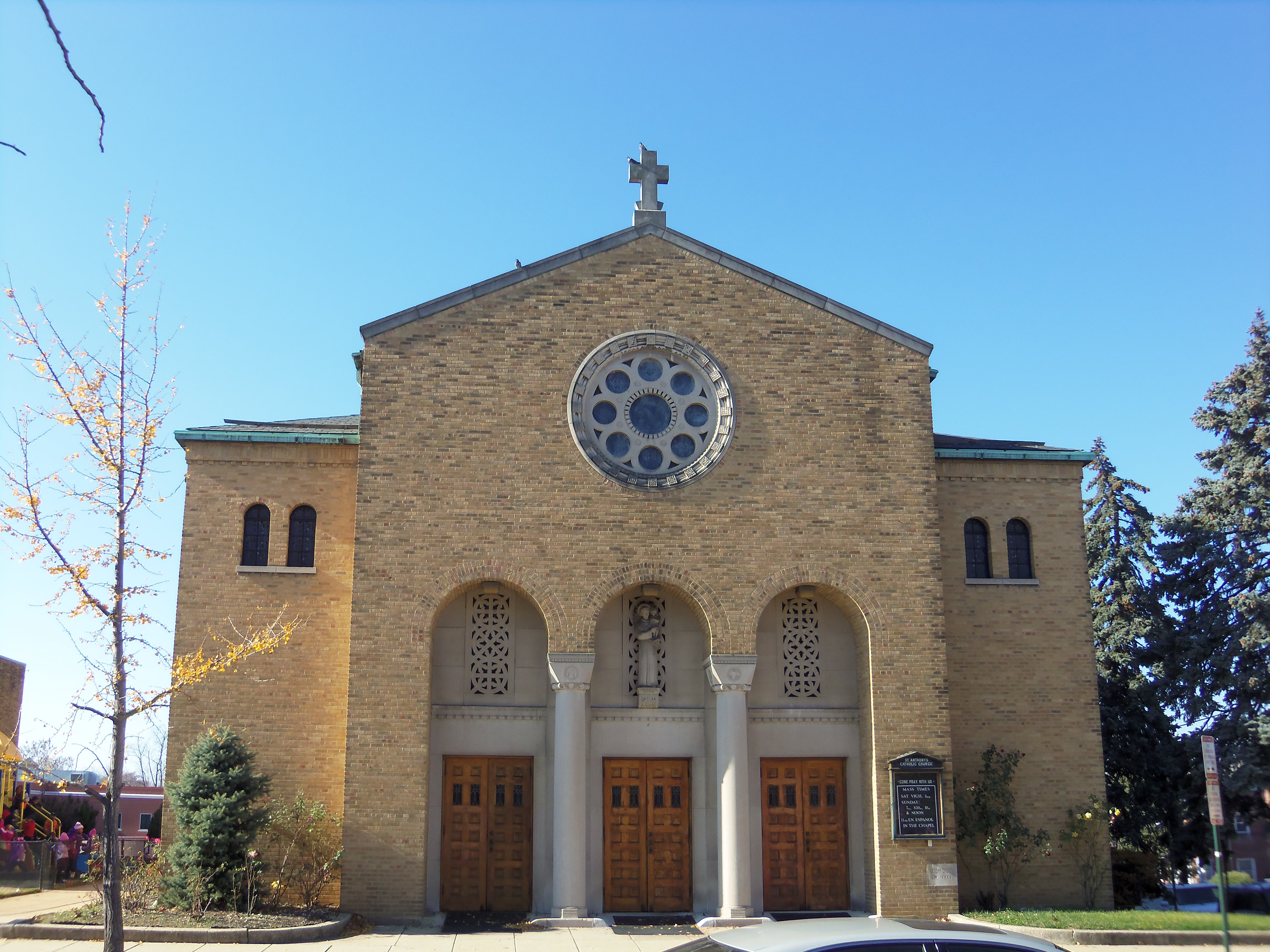
- St. Anthony of Padua Catholic Church
- St. Anthony of Padua; Catholic Church
- 38.9323°N 76.9912°W
- Location: 1029 Monroe Street, NE, Washington, D.C.
- Country: United States
- Denomination: Catholic Church
- Website: www.stanthonyofpaduadc.org

Administration
- Archdiocese: Washington

St. Anthony of Padua Church is the parish church of the Catholic parish in Washington, D.C., within the Archdiocese of Washington. Founded shortly after the Catholic University of America, the Franciscan Monastery, and the Dominican House of Studies, the parish church is located at 1029 Monroe Street NE in the Brookland neighborhood of Northeast Washington, commonly referred to as "Little Rome".

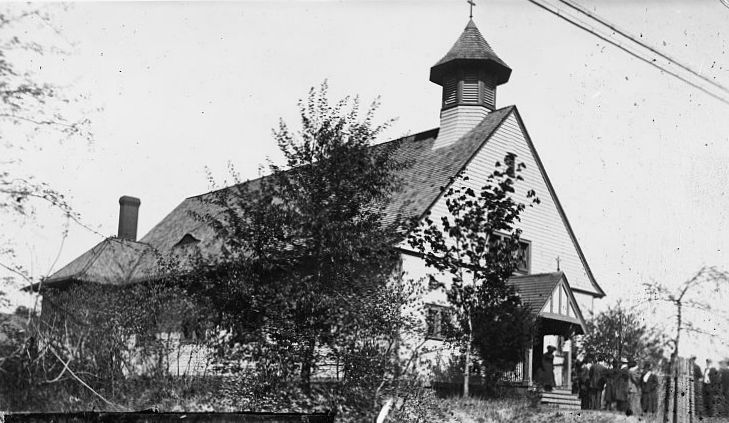
The original church building.

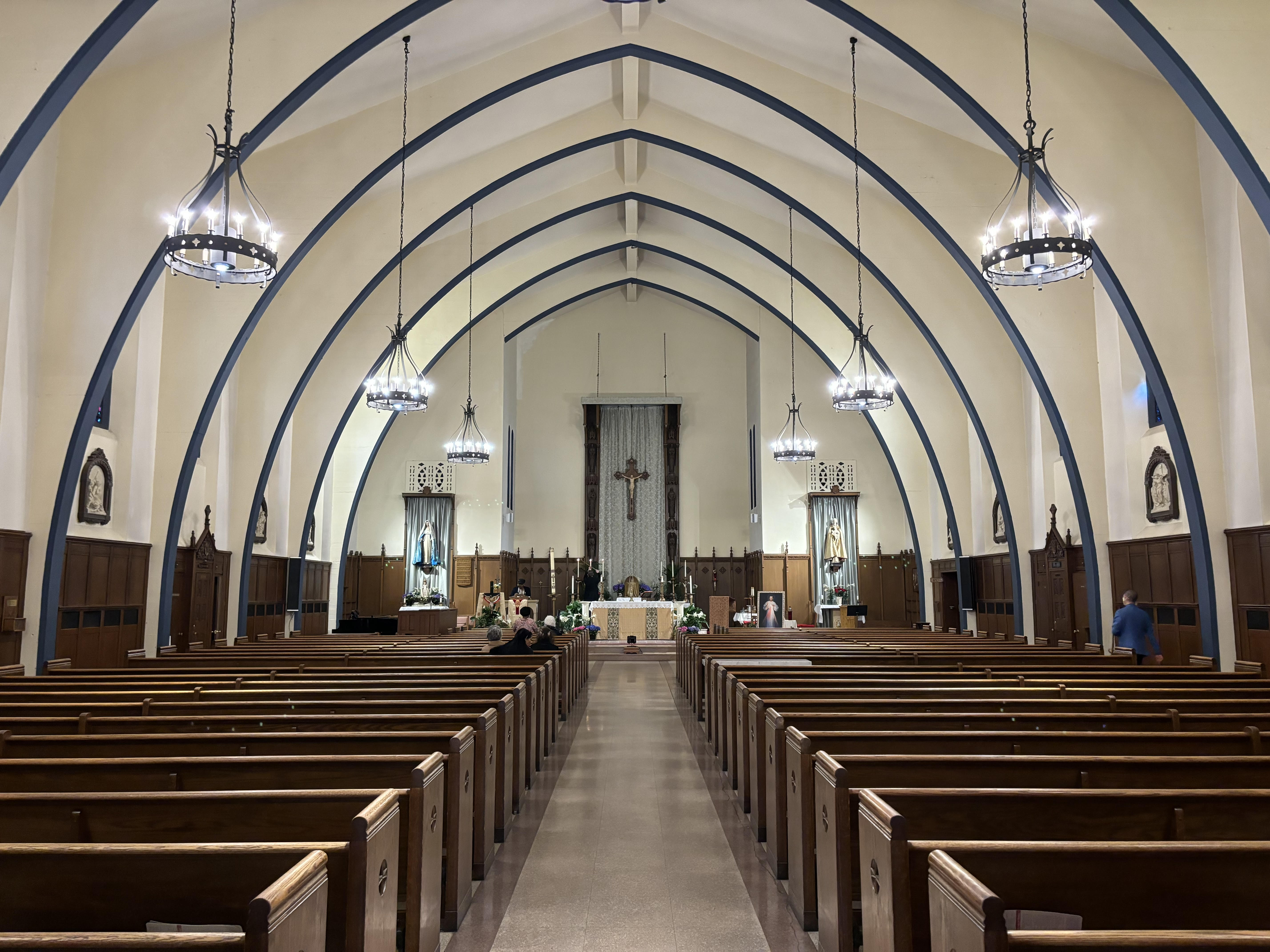
Interior of the present church.

== History ==
In 1891, Antoinette Margot, an associate of Clara Barton and founding member of International Red Cross, moved to the newly developed Brookland area. She and her friend, Leonide Delarue, obtained the assistance of the head of the Ancient Languages Department at the Catholic University of America, Fr. Henri Hyvernat, in the organizing of a new parish for the neighborhood surrounding the university.

The first Mass for the Catholic community was celebrated on September 19, 1891, by Fr. James F. Mackin in the home of Miss Margot and Miss Delarue and her mother, Theodoran, at 10th and Bunker Hill Road, NE. Among the first parishioners were members of the Brooks, Julien, Yznaga, Gannon, Paige and Rianhardt families.

The official parish was later created by Cardinal James Gibbons with the appointment of the first pastor, Desire C. DeWulf.

The parish is adjoined to St. Anthony Catholic School to the present day, now part of the Consortium of Catholic Academies.
