= Aggersel =

Ancient city in the Roman province of Africa Proconsularis

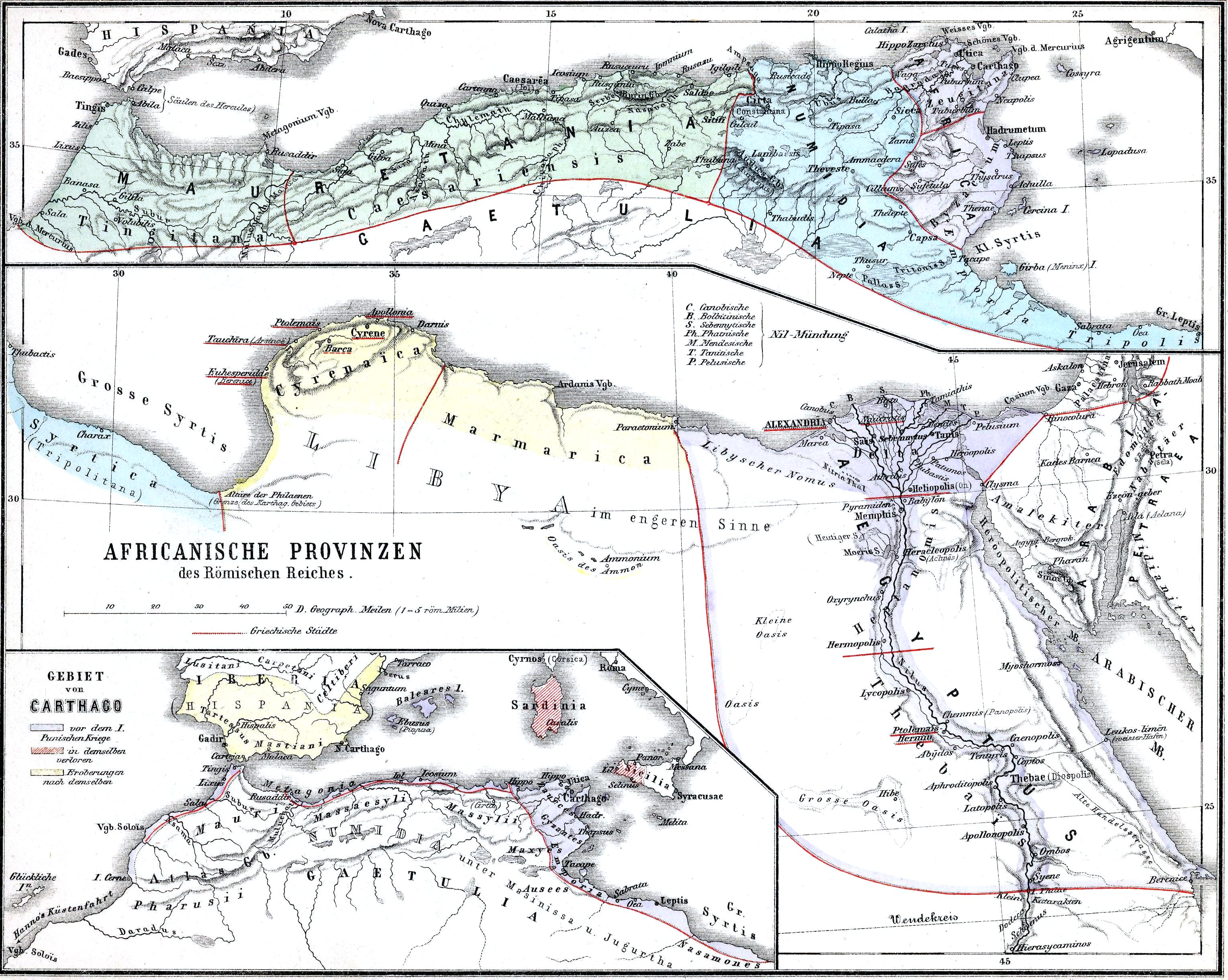
Roman Africa.

Aggersel was an ancient city in the Roman province of Africa Proconsularis. Aggersel was a former Roman Catholic Diocese of the Roman Catholic Church and is now a titular see.
