= Opus Hall =

Dormitory at the Catholic University of America

Coordinates: 38.939403°N 76.998552°W

Opus Hall is a dormitory and one of 10 housing options for students at the Catholic University of America. It opened in 2009 and houses 395 upperclassmen. Opus is the only dormitory building on campus that houses both male and female students; male students reside in the South wing, and females reside in the North wing.

The seven-story, 127,000 square-foot building has 79 suites, each of which has one double and three single bedrooms, a common living room, double sink, bathroom, and shower. Each floor has a full-service kitchen and common area, and the first floor lounge includes a fireplace, central laundry room, and a study area. Outside the building is a 2,100-square-foot elevated terrace. The building is LEED-certified with a “collegiate Gothic” architectural design.
