= Millennium South =

Dormitory for students at The Catholic University of America

Coordinates: 38.93738°N 76.99687°W

Millennium South is a dormitory and one of 10 housing options for students at The Catholic University of America. Built in 2001, it offers suite- and apartment-style options. With Millennium North, it houses 350 upperclassmen.
