= Gibbons Hall =

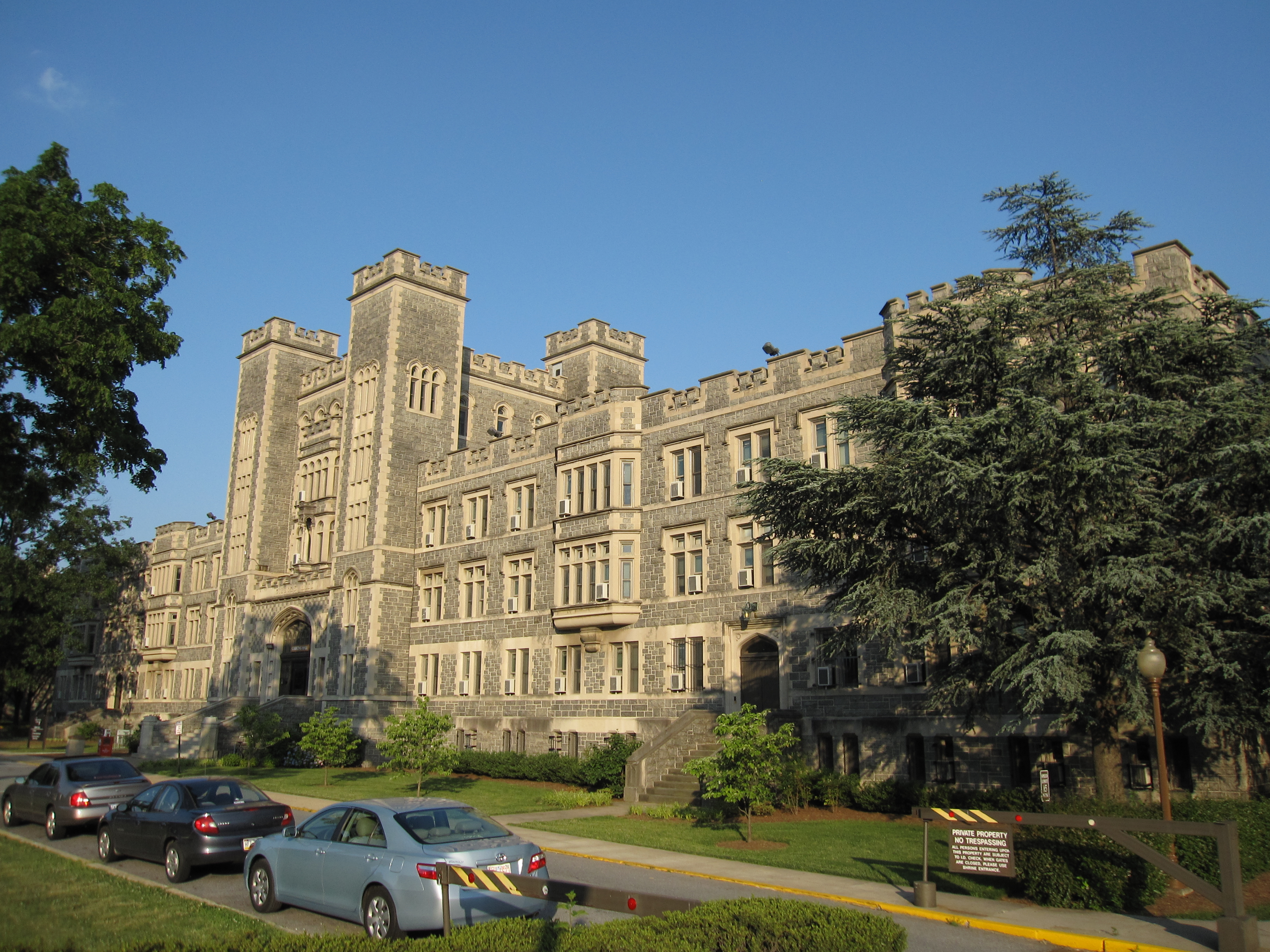
- Gibbons Hall in 2010
- Interactive map of the Gibbons Hall area

General information
- Type: Dormitory
- Location: 620 Michigan Ave., N.E. Washington, DC 20064; United States
- Coordinates: 38°55′56″N 76°59′57″W
- Completed: 1911
- Renovated: 2009

Gibbons Hall is a female dormitory for 138 upper-class students and one of 10 housing options for students at The Catholic University of America. Constructed in 1911 and named for the university's first chancellor, Cardinal James Gibbons, it was renovated in 2009. It is marked by a large central tower.
