= Navy Superior Public Service Award =

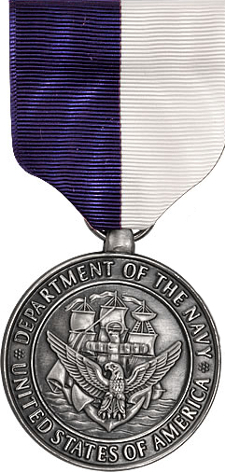
- Medal of the award
- Type: Civil decoration
- Awarded for: Significant contributions that have broad impact on a major organizational element or large geographical area
- Country: United States
- Presented by: Secretary of the Navy
- Eligibility: Private citizens not employed by the Department of the Navy
- Status: Active
- Ribbon bar of the award

Precedence
- Next (higher): Navy Distinguished Public Service Award
- Next (lower): Navy Meritorious Public Service Award
- Related: Navy Superior Civilian Service Award

The Navy Superior Public Service Award is the second highest award that the United States Department of the Navy can present to a private civilian not employed by the department. Like the other Navy Public Service Awards, it is generally awarded "to business and civic leaders, scientists and other nongovernment civilians." It recognizes significant contributions that have broad impact on the mission of the United States Navy. These contributions need not necessarily affect the entire department of the Navy, but "must have substantially benefited a major organizational element or large geographical area." The secretary of the Navy and certain commanding officers may make the award and sign the certificate.

== Design ==
The medal, designed by the United States Mint, is silver in color. The obverse has the Seal of the Navy Department, encircled by the inscription above "DEPARTMENT OF THE NAVY" and below, "UNITED STATES OF AMERICA." The reverse has the words "Awarded to" with a blank tablet for inscription of the recipient's name, resting on a spray of laurel. Arched at the top rim of the reverse of the medal is the word "SUPERIOR." Horizontally, below the tablet, is the word "PUBLIC" and arched along the bottom rim is the word "SERVICE." The medal is suspended by a ribbon using divided in half vertically with blue on the left, and white on the right. Recipients of the award are presented with the full-size medal, in addition to a miniature medal, a mounted ribbon, and a lapel pin. Also included with the award is a certificate signed by the Secretary of the Navy, or the commanding officer authorizing the award.

== Notable recipients ==
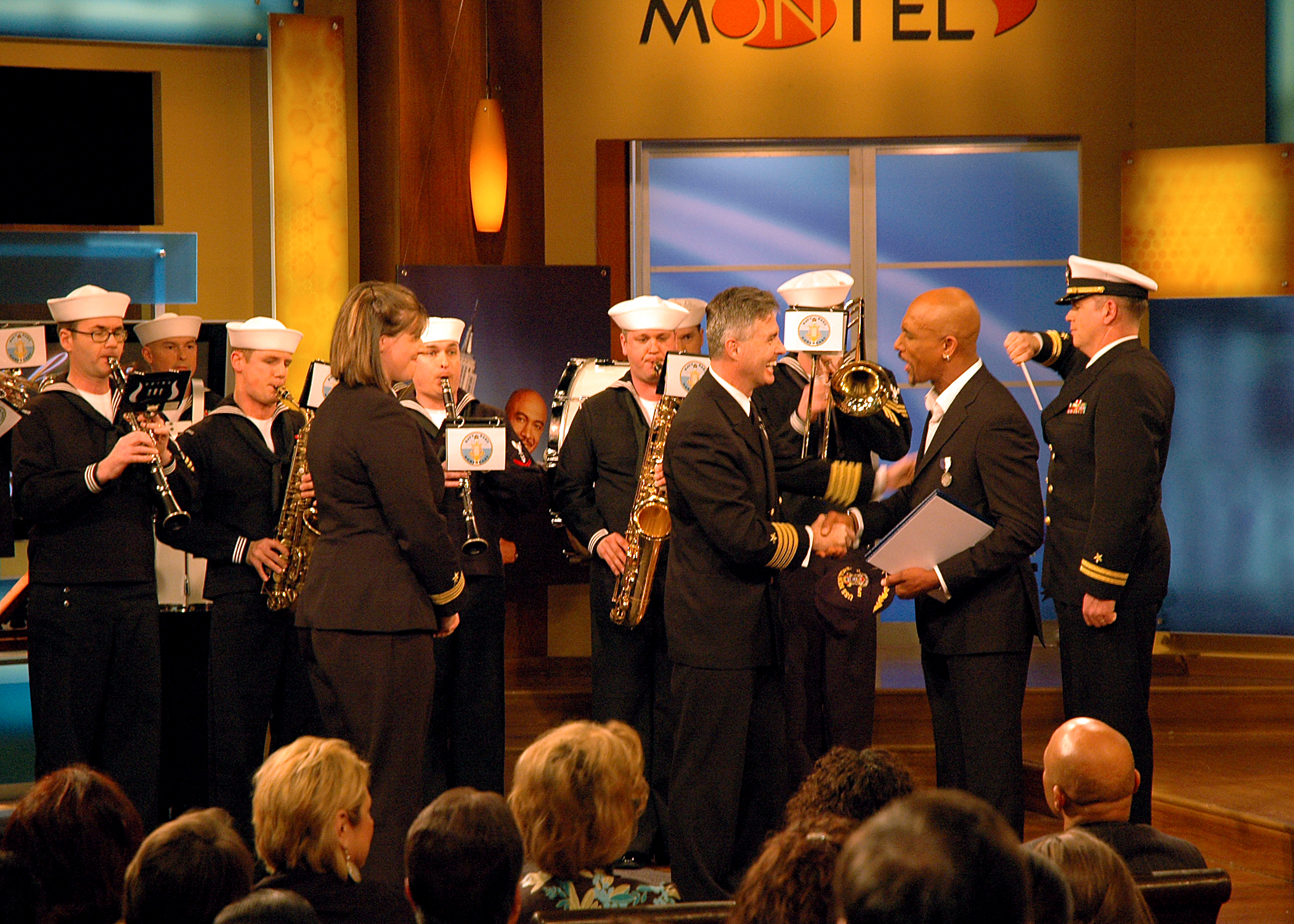
Rear Admiral Kenneth J. Braithwaite presenting the Superior Public Service Award to talk show host Montel Williams

On 7 October 2006, American country music singer Toby Keith was awarded the Superior Public Service Award while performing at a concert outside of Washington, DC. The award was made in recognition of Keith's work touring the world in places such as Iraq, Afghanistan, Kuwait, Bosnia, and Kosovo to entertain United States troops. He also spent time entertaining wounded veterans at Walter Reed Army Medical Center.

Talk show host Montel Williams was awarded the Superior Public Service Award on 19 March 2008. This award was presented to Williams in honor of his "continuous support and recognition of Sailors, Marines and their families throughout his 17 years on television." Williams enlisted in the United States Marine Corps in 1974 and in 1975 he was selected as the first black Marine to attend the Navy Prep School before graduating from the United States Naval Academy in 1980. Williams was commissioned as an intelligence officer specializing in cryptology.

On 28 March 2018, singer Jimmy Buffett was awarded the Superior Public Service Award while performing a concert at the United States Naval Academy in Annapolis, Maryland. The award was given to him to commemorate his contributions and support of the Navy.

== See also ==
- Navy Distinguished Civilian Service Award
- Navy Meritorious Civilian Service Award
