= Thomas H. Locraft =

American architect and academic

- Born: November 13, 1903; Washington, D.C.
- Died: August 31, 1959 (aged 55); Washington, D.C.
- Occupation: Architect
- Practice: Murphy & Locraft; Thomas H. Locraft & Associates

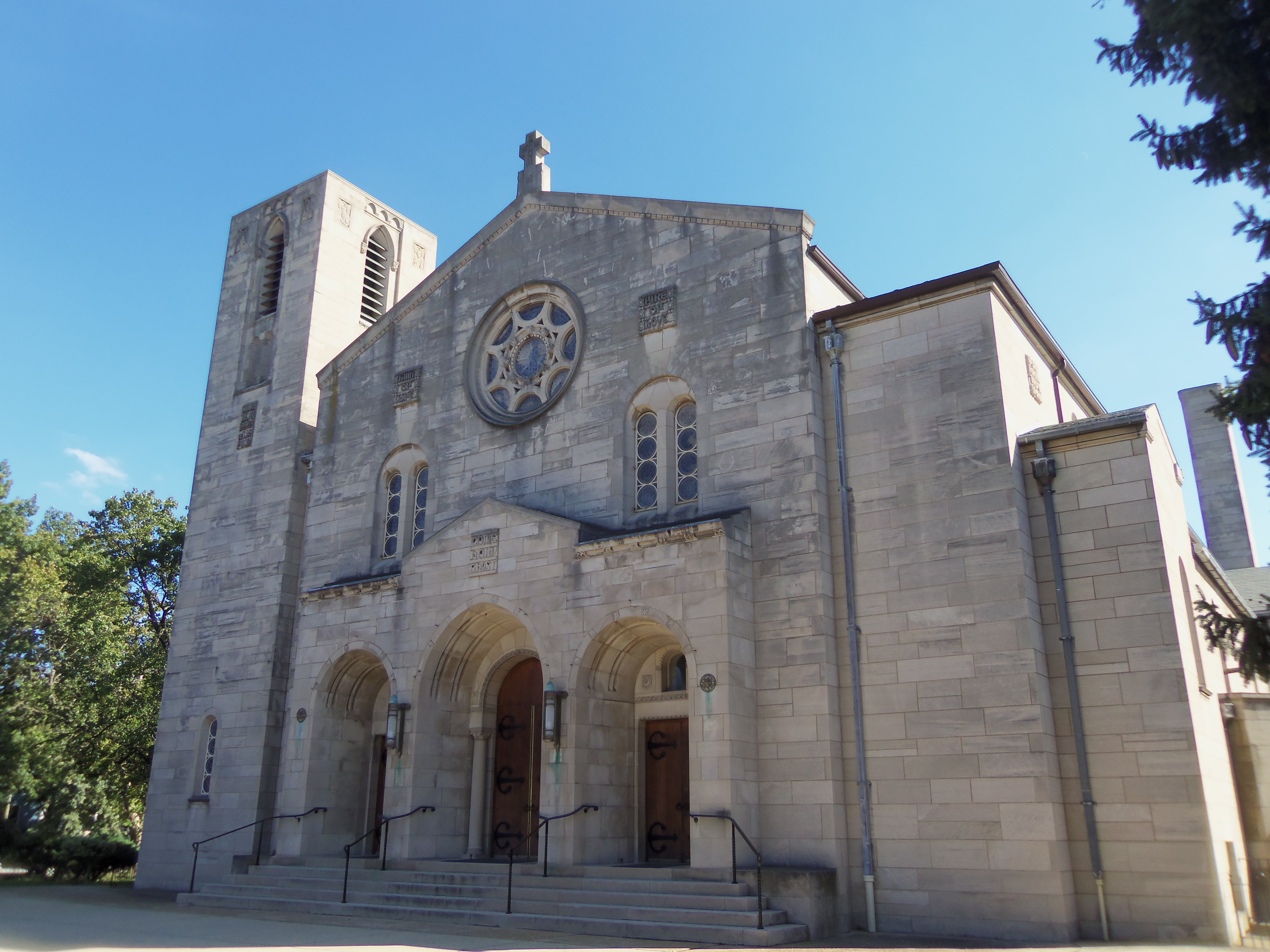
Holy Comforter-St. Cyprian Catholic Church in Washington, D.C., designed by Murphy & Locraft and completed in 1939.

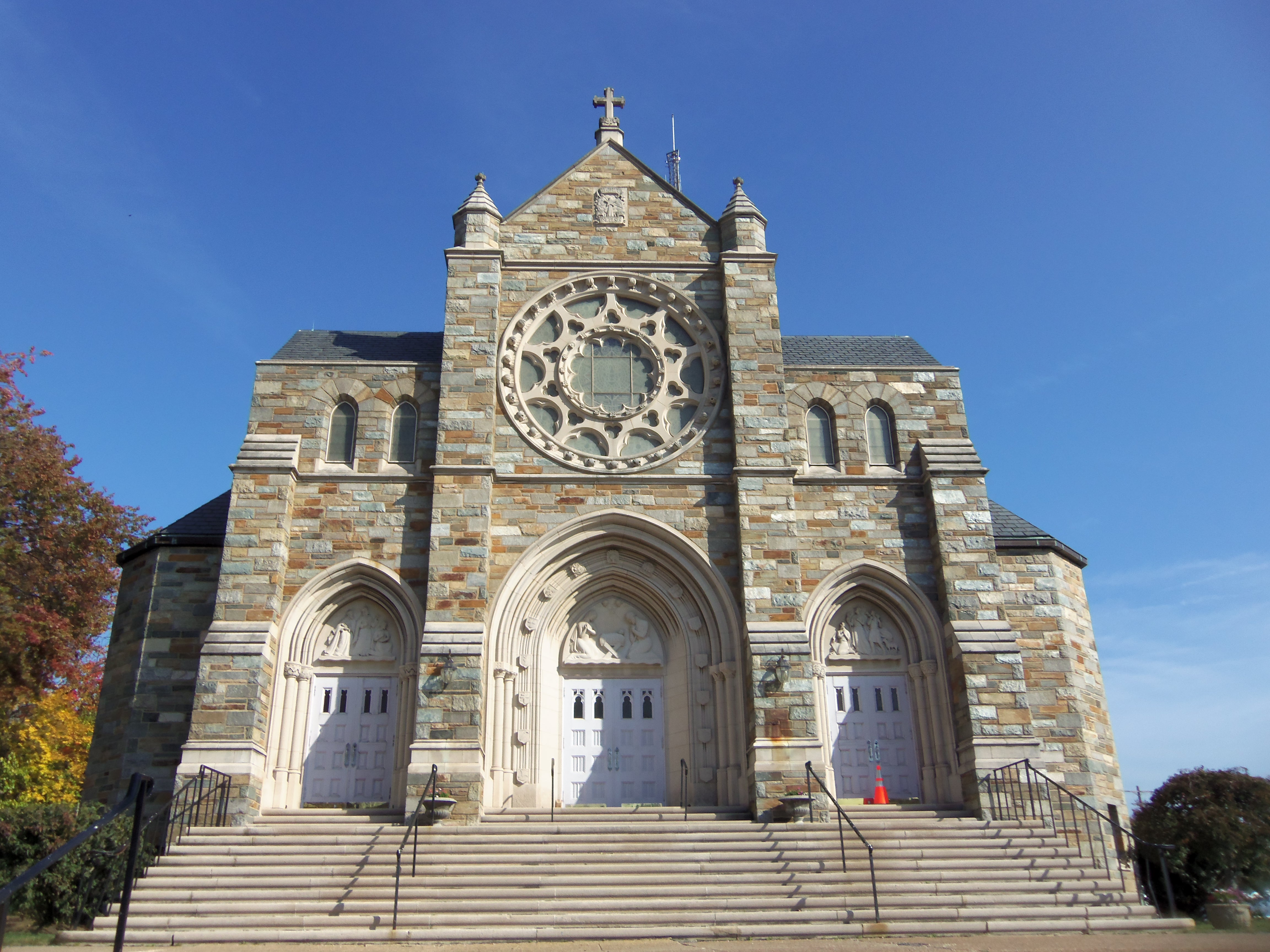
Nativity Catholic Church in Washington, D.C., completed in 1942.

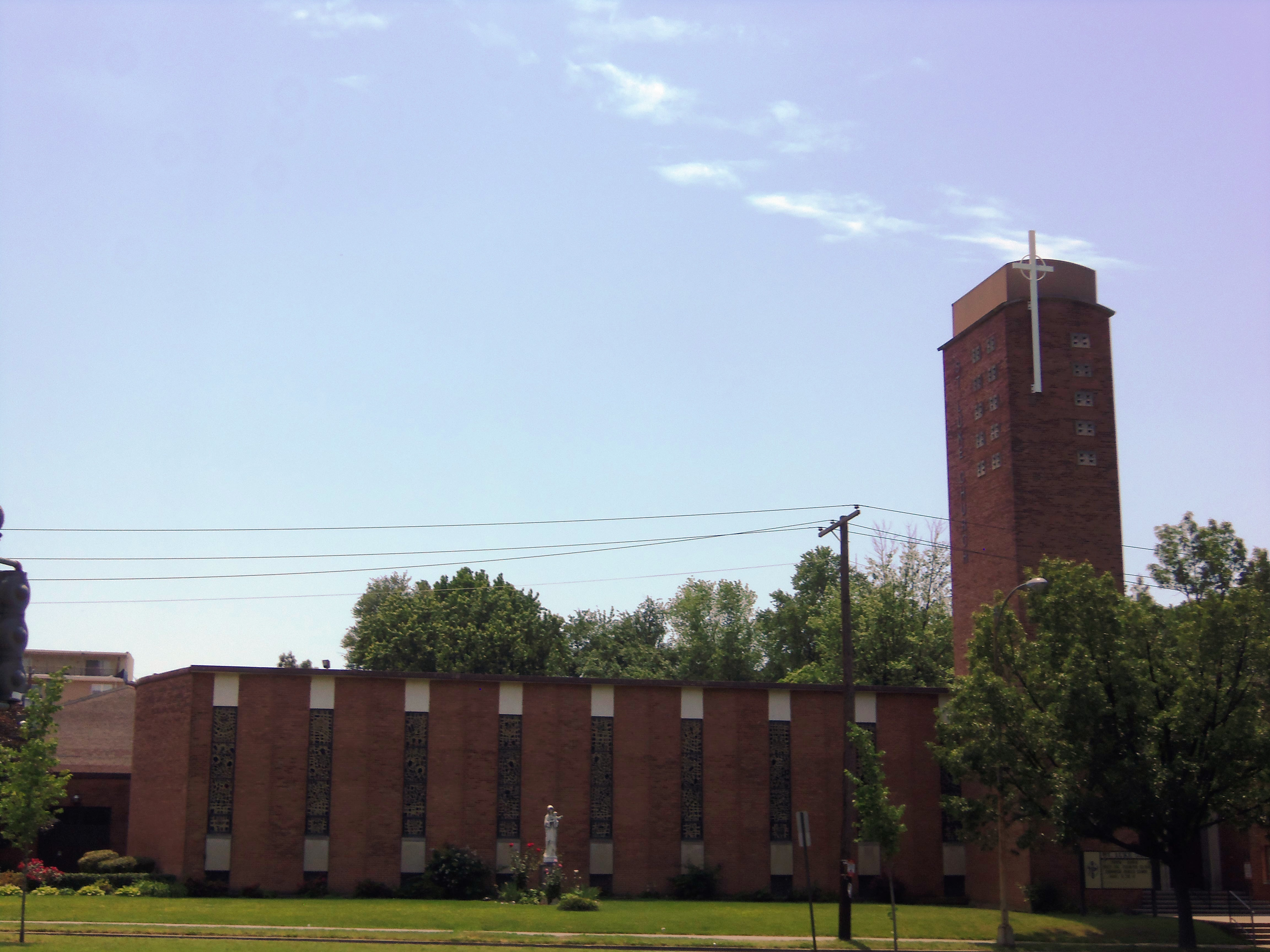
St. Luke Catholic Church in Washington, D.C., completed in 1957.

Thomas H. Locraft FAIA (November 16, 1903 – August 31, 1959) was an American architect and architectural educator. He was in practice in Washington, D.C. from 1937 to 1959 and was head of the Catholic University School of Architecture and Planning from 1949 to 1959.

== Professional and academic career ==
Thomas Hall Locraft was born November 13, 1903, in Washington, D.C. to Bernard Francis Locraft and Marie (DeLacy) Locraft. He was educated at Central High School and at the Catholic University of America (CUA), graduating from the latter in 1926. In 1928 he was recipient of the Paris Prize of the Beaux-Arts Institute of Design, which enabled him to study at the École des Beaux-Arts. Upon his return to the United States in 1931 he was awarded a PhD in architecture from CUA, and thereafter began teaching in the CUA architecture department. Before, during and after his education he worked for architects James Berrall, Jules Henri de Sibour, Frederic B. Pyle and Waddy B. Wood before joining Murphy & Olmsted, the practice of Frederick V. Murphy, head of CUA architecture. In 1937 Murphy's partner died, and in 1938 a new partnership, Murphy & Locraft, was formed. During their partnership Locraft introduced elements of modern architecture into their projects, including the Iglesia Cristo Rey in Manizales, Colombia, completed in 1950. Murphy retired from practice in 1954, and Locraft continued the firm as Murphy & Locraft in partnership with Paul A. Goettelmann, maintaining its focus on Catholic architecture. In 1957 the firm became Thomas H. Locraft & Associates with the promotion of several other employees. When Locraft died that same year, it became Thomas H. Locraft Associates with Goettelmann at the head.

Locraft began teaching in the Catholic University School of Architecture and Planning, then under Murphy's direction. When Murphy retired from his position in 1949, Locraft was appointed as his successor. He remained in this position until his death, and was succeeded by Goettelmann, his partner and former student.

Locraft joined the American Institute of Architects in 1936 as a member of the Washington chapter. He served as chapter president for 1944–45 and was elected a Fellow in 1952.

== Personal life ==
Locraft was married in 1932 to Jane Harkness Elgas in New York City. They had four children: three sons and one daughter. One son, Matthew Elgas Locraft, also became an architect and was a long-time associate of Collins & Kronstadt of Silver Spring. Locraft died August 31, 1959, at the age of 55.

== Architectural works ==
=== Murphy & Locraft, 1938–1957 ===
- St. Martin of Tours Catholic Church, 1908 N Capitol St NW, Washington, D.C. (1938)
- Holy Comforter-St. Cyprian Catholic Church, 1357 E Capitol St, Washington, D.C. (1939)
- Fourier Hall, Notre Dame of Maryland University, Baltimore (1940)
- Nativity Catholic Church, 6001 13th St NW, Washington, D.C. (1942)
- Iglesia Cristo Rey, Carrera 23b, Manizales, Caldas Department, Colombia (1948–50)
- Shahan Hall, Catholic University, Washington, D.C. (1950)
- Archbishop Carroll High School, 4300 Harewood Rd NE, Washington, D.C. (1951–53)
- Basilica of the National Shrine of the Assumption of the Blessed Virgin Mary restoration, 409 Cathedral St, Baltimore (1951)
- Immaculate Conception Catholic Church, 1212 Morningside Ave, Sioux City, Iowa (1952–53)
- Lorraine American Cemetery and Memorial, Saint-Avold, Moselle, France (1953–60)
- Marine Memorial Chapel, Marine Corps Base Quantico, Quantico, Virginia (1955–57)
- St. Luke Catholic Church, 4925 E Capitol St SE, Washington, D.C. (1956–57)

=== Thomas H. Locraft & Associates, 1957–1959 ===
- McGivney Hall, Catholic University, Washington, D.C. (1957)
- Edmund A. Walsh Building, Georgetown University, Washington, D.C. (1958)
- Elstad Auditorium, Gallaudet University, Washington, D.C. (1959–63)
- Elizabeth Seton High School, 5715 Emerson St, Bladensburg, Maryland (1959)
