= Mary Louise Prather =

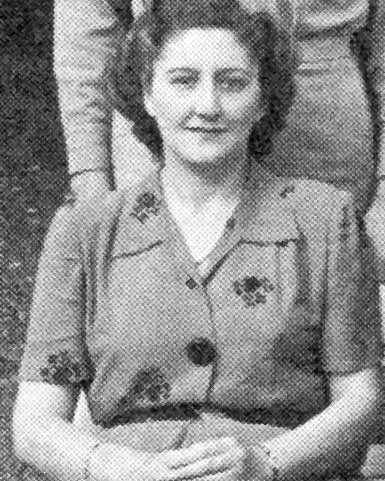
- Born: 1913; Washington, D.C.
- Died: December 23, 1996 (aged 82–83)
- Employer: Signal Intelligence Service
- Known for: WWII female cryptographer
- Awards: Meritorious Civilian Service Award

Mary Louise Prather (1913 – 23 December 1996) was an American spy and one of the pioneering women within the field of cryptography. Most of her work in the field of cryptography was completed during World War II and early in the Cold War era.

Prather joined the Signal Intelligence Service (SIS) as a civilian stenographer in 1938, an entry-level position, and worked a variety of jobs that included the many machines of the office. Eventually, in 1940, she achieved the position of Chief of the Stenographic section. Prather came in at her entry-level position and worked her way up to higher positions by learning the processes of different atypical office machines used for decoding. These were important in sorting of coded enemy messages for translation.

== Biography ==
Mary Louise Prather was born in 1913, to a family that was struggling due to tough economic conditions. There is very little known about her childhood and early life, but she was born in Washington, D.C. and spent her entire life in that area.

Prather began working early in the Signal Intelligence Service (SIS) office as a civilian stenographer. She worked entry-level positions at first and was later promoted to Administrative Assistant and personal officer for the General of the Cryptographic Branch.

After the conclusion of the war in 1946, Prather was awarded the Commendation for Meritorious Civilian Service Award. In the 1950s Prather continued to work within the offices of cryptography increasing her duties, responsibilities, and positions increased until her biggest and final promotion in 1960, to Chief of The Soviet Information Division. In 1969, she retired as the Division Chief of National Security Agency and was recognized with the Meritorious Civilian Service Award.

=== Education ===
Prather had to receive schooling in many different fields, followed by training to learn to use the many different machines. The areas where she received training and education included: cryptographic security, elementary and advanced cryptography, IBM theory and operation, code compilation, preparation of cryptanalytic worksheets, army and staff organization from a signal intelligence viewpoint, and Japanese, and German.

== Work ==
Within the Signal Intelligence Service (SIS), Prather worked many different jobs. She began as an entry-level clerical worker and climbed the chain of command to the position of Chief of the Stenographic Division. At the beginning, many of Prather's jobs included working on the office machines such as the sorter, reproducer, tabulator, and key punch. Although this was thought to be menial women's work, these machines were integral in the sorting of enemy messages that needed to be decoded.

Besides working with the machines Prather, was also in charge of filing intercepted messages. However, this part of the work had to be done very secretly, because intercepting these messages was an illegal tactic during the war. When a message was received, a careful log was kept to document it, when it was received, and from who it was intercepted from.

Connected to the interception of coded messages was the job of logging the messages in code. The messages that were intercepted were separated, based on the codes that were used to hide the messages, until they could be worked on for decoding.

The final piece of Prather's duties was the distribution of the decoded messages to the appropriate people. Working with the messages while coded and then decoded was part of what lead Prather to her greatest discovery and allowed for a momentous aid to the war effort. She was responsible for identifying a correlation between two Japanese messages. By recognizing this correlation a decryption key for the Japanese code was developed, leading to many decryptions of Japanese coded messages in 1940.

== Awards ==
In 1969, Prather received a Commendation for Meritorious Civilian Service after noticing a correlation between several coded Japanese messages. Her discovery led to the eventual breaking of the code being used by the Japanese to send encrypted messages during the war.

== Death ==
Prather died on December 20, 1996, from a stroke, aged 83 years.
