= GOOOH =

Political movement in the United States

GOOOH logo

GOOOH (pronounced "go") stands for "Get Out of Our House." It is a non-partisan plan to replace the members of the United States House of Representatives with what it views as 'true citizen representatives.'

GOOOH claims the two-party system is broken, and that elected officials are indebted primarily to themselves and their supporters.

GOOOH proposes a new method for choosing candidates. The plan is detailed in the book Get Out Of Our House: Revolution! Members will be randomly sorted into pools of ten, within their congressional district, and each group will select two candidates to represent that group. Those chosen will advance and be grouped into new pools of ten. The process will repeat until the final pool of ten chooses a single candidate, who becomes the GOOOH candidate for that district.

GOOOH views this method as conducive to proper district representation.

GOOOH is a non-partisan candidate selection process. It is not a political party with an agenda-based platform. Each chosen candidate will determine how to compete, but it is the stated intention of GOOOH to run in the primaries against the incumbents. Instead, it requires candidates to clearly state their own personal platforms via a Candidate Questionnaire and then to live up to their commitments. GOOOH requires that participants in the process agree to vote for a term limits (currently proposed as 2) in order to ensure the chosen leaders stay in touch with the needs of their district. Another of GOOOH's goals is to remove the influence of money from the election process. They intend to raise the needed funds via member donations member crowdfunding and prohibit outside campaign contributions.

GOOOH goals:

- To allow everyday Americans an equal opportunity to run for Congress via a participant-financed campaign fund.
- To allow the electoral body in each congressional district to understand, in advance, how candidates will legislate on a variety of issues.
- To allow participants to select a nominee for the U.S. House of Representatives who represents the views of their congressional district.
- To replace career politicians with citizen statesmen.
- To hold Representatives accountable to their pre-election promises.
- To decrease the amount of control the two parties and their leaders have on the election process.
- To eliminate the influence of special interest financing on the election process.

== FEC status ==
GOOOH is registered with the Federal Election Commission (FEC) as a non-connected Political Action Committee and intends to operate this way until it has multiple Congressional candidates identified and has met all other National Committee standards. At that time it will consider applying for National Committee status.

GOOOH is listed as an anti-US government 'Patriot' group by the Southern Poverty Law Center.

== Campaign role ==
At the national level, GOOOH leadership is responsible for overseeing a self-funding selection process enabling everyday Americans with modest means to be chosen by the populace of their congressional district as federal Congressional candidates for the U.S. House of Representatives, as well as financing their congressional campaigns in the national elections. It is responsible for promoting its candidate selection system and coordinating party organizational activity.

GOOOH plays no role in presidential elections and focuses solely on Congressional elections for the U.S. House of Representatives. It will raise funds, commission polls, assist in marketing, and coordinate campaign strategies. Following the selection of a party nominee, the public funding laws permit GOOOH to coordinate certain expenditures with the nominee, but additional funds will be spent on building name recognition.

== Candidate funding system ==
All qualifying citizens wishing to become GOOOH candidates on their district's ballot will participate in funding a collective national campaign via a fee paid as a requirement to participate in the candidate selection sessions. The collected fees from participants will be used to promote the system nationally, as well as for individual campaigns.

== Candidate application process ==
Candidates will be chosen by their peers from those participating in the GOOOH Candidate Selection Sessions. Every person who participates has an equal chance of being chosen. Candidates will be required to complete a six step process:

1. Become a member on the GOOOH website.
2. Pass a Candidate Screening Exam to ensure eligibility.
3. Fill in an online Candidate Questionnaire to publicly record their personal platform.
4. Sign a Commitment Agreement stating they will legislate according to their questionnaire answers, or voluntarily resign within 72 hours.
5. Make a $100 donation to the national fund.
6. Submit their entry, thus registering to attend a candidate selection session in their district.

Candidate Screening Exam: Certain categories of people may be screened from the process based on Constitutional requirements, over-representation in government or other factors. Examples of groups excluded, but not limited to, include: non-U.S. citizens, those under the age of 25, and those who have held federal political office.

Candidate Questionnaire: Candidates’ submitted answers will be made available to other candidates assigned to their selection pool, and possibly to the public at large. The responses of the selected candidate will become public record. Input to the questions will be accepted via an online Web site. Modifications to the final Questionnaire are ongoing.

Commitment Agreement: A legally binding document that each Candidate will be required to sign in which each candidate promises they will resign from office if they vote against any answer given in their Questionnaire. The "Override Clause" allows candidates to change their answer if they have the approval of the members in their district.

National Campaign Support Fee: The fee is required to 1) seed the national campaign "war chest" for all 435 GOOOH Candidates, 2) eliminate those who are not serious candidates, and 3) pay for expenses of the system.

== Current growth status and campaign launch projection ==
As of December 2010, GOOOH had 85,000 members nationally, and has directors in nearly every state, with the most active states being Texas, Florida, Ohio, Tennessee, Kentucky, and North Carolina Just after the health care reform vote, GOOOH.com attracted its one millionth website visitor. Upon recruiting 500,000 members, GOOOH states it will begin fund-raising and conduct its Candidate Selection Sessions to select GOOOH candidates for running in the national Congressional elections.

== GOOOH founding and leadership ==
GOOOH was founded in 2007 by former Dell employee Tim Cox of Texas and author of the book Get Out of Our House: Revolution! ISBN 978-1-934454-03-9

Cox has been featured on numerous media programs — from ABC, CBS, Fox and NBC to Time Warner and MSNBC. Cox has also been a guest of Dennis Miller, Montel Williams, Lou Dobbs and more than 150 local radio hosts.

== See also ==
- Tea Party movement
- Non-partisan democracy
- Consensus democracy
- Participatory democracy
- Sortition
