= Paul A. Goettelmann =

American architect and educator (1907–1976)

- Born: May 5, 1907; Bellevue, Kentucky
- Died: September 16, 1976 (aged 69); Silver Spring, Maryland
- Occupation: Architect
- Awards: Fellow of the American Institute of Architects; Benemerenti medal; Navy Meritorious Public Service Award
- Practice: Murphy & Locraft; Thomas H. Locraft & Associates; Thomas H. Locraft Associates; Goettelmann & Xepapas

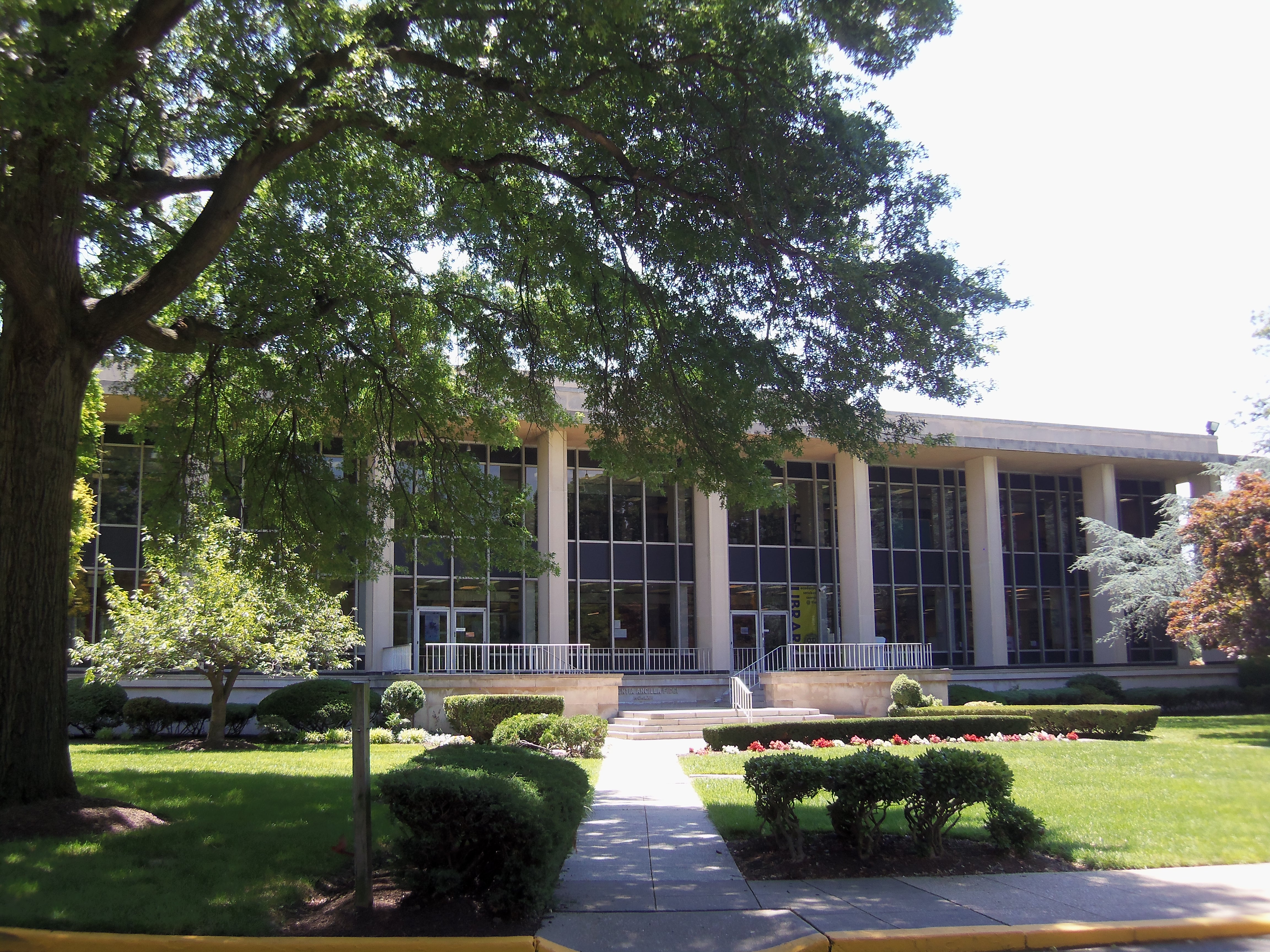
Sister Helen Sheehan Library of Trinity Washington University, completed in 1963.

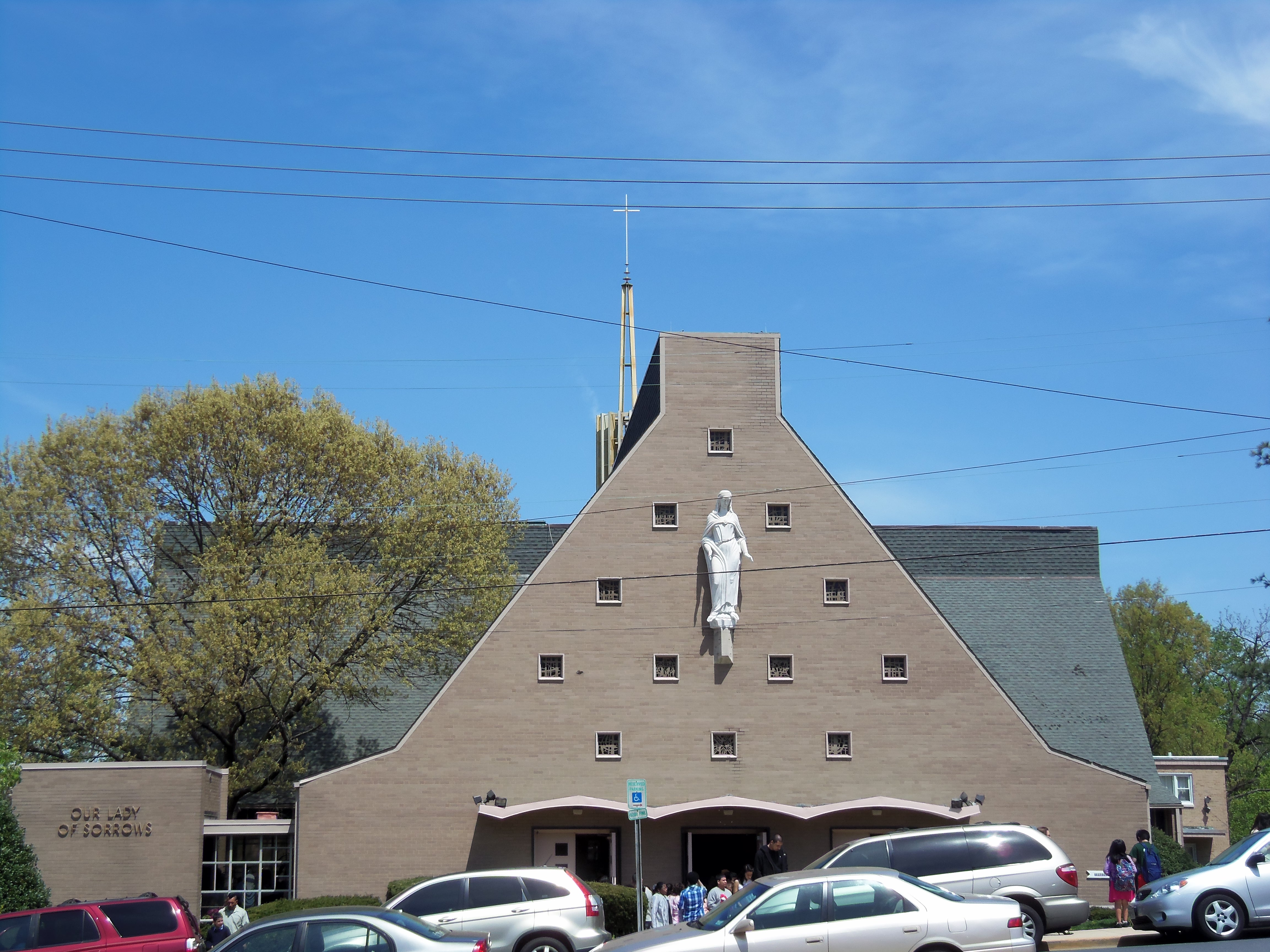
Our Lady of Sorrows Catholic Church in Takoma Park, completed in 1963.

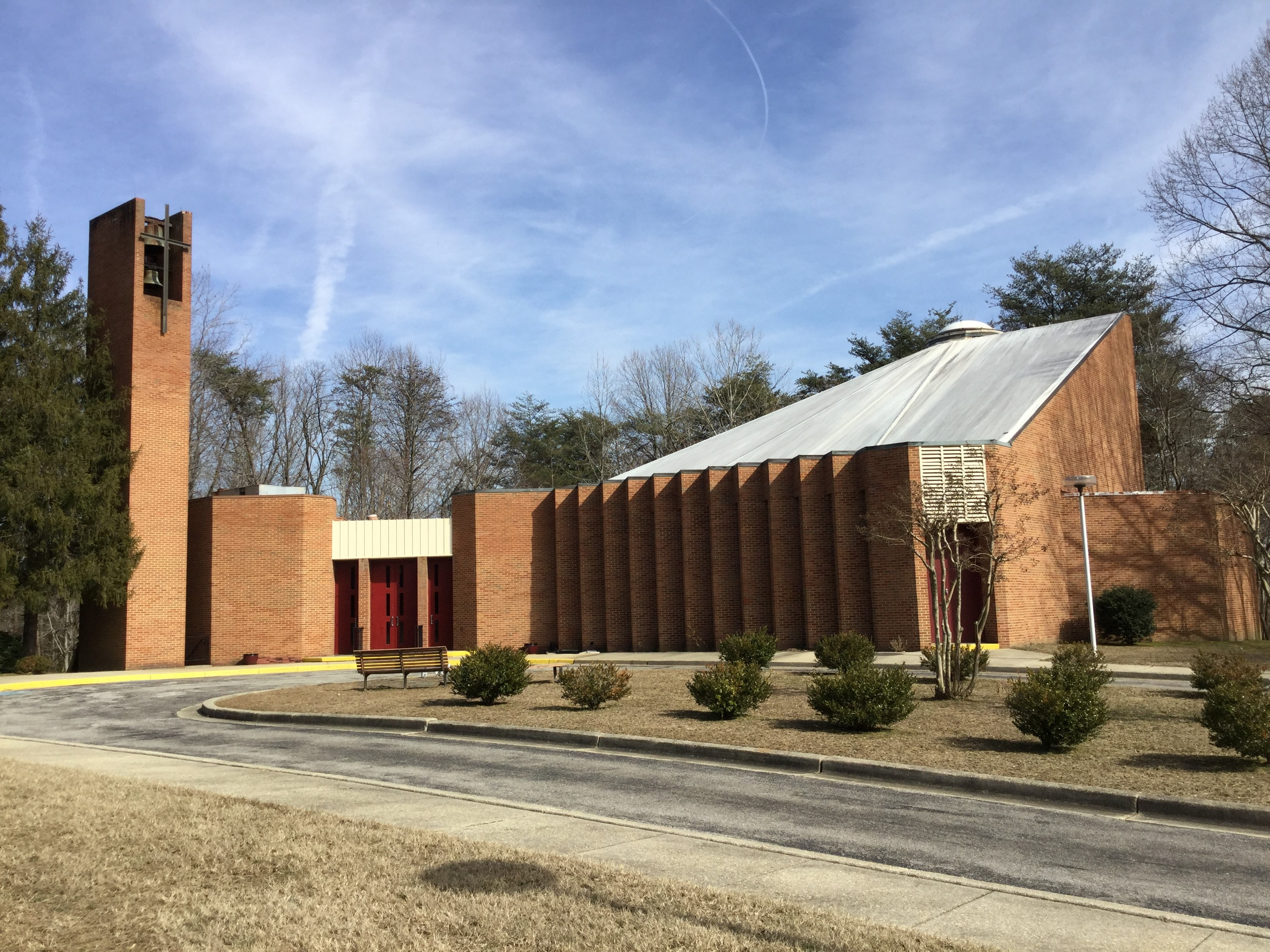
The Church of the Holy Spirit in Forestville, built in 1970.

Paul A. Goettelmann FAIA (May 5, 1907 – September 16, 1976) was an American architect and architectural educator. He was in practice in Washington, D.C. from 1954 to 1976 and was head of the Catholic University School of Architecture and Planning from 1959 to 1974.

== Life and career ==
Paul Auguste Goettelmann was born May 5, 1907, in Bellevue, Kentucky to Fernand Camille Goettelmann and Germaine Helene (Schirr) Goettelmann. He was educated at the Catholic University of America (CUA), graduating with a BS in Architecture in 1929 and a MA in architecture in 1930. He further earned a PhD in architecture in 1933. He then joined architects Murphy & Olmsted, the practice of Frederick V. Murphy, head of CUA architecture. This became Murphy & Locraft in 1938 and in 1954, when Murphy retired, Goettelmann became Locraft's partner.

In 1957 the firm became Thomas H. Locraft & Associates and in 1959, after Locraft died, it became Thomas H. Locraft Associates, with Goettelmann as senior partner. In 1964 Locraft Associates was divided into two firms, with Goettelmann forming Goettelmann & Xepapas with Anargyros N. Xepapas and his associates forming Allard & Joutz. Xepapas moved to Daytona Beach, Florida in 1970, but Goettelmann continued practicing under the name of Goettelmann & Xepapas until his death in 1976.

Goettelmann began teaching at CUA in 1935. He was promoted to assistant professor in 1940, associate professor in 1949 and professor in 1959 when he was appointed to succeed Locraft as head of the architecture department. In 1965, when the department was made a school of the university, he became its associate dean. He retired from that position in 1974 but continued to teach until his death.

Goettelmann joined the American Institute of Architects in 1942 as a member of the Washington chapter. He served as chapter president for 1950–51. In 1964 he was elected a Fellow. That same year he was awarded the Benemerenti medal by Pope Paul VI and in 1967 was awarded the Navy Meritorious Public Service Award.

== Personal life ==
Goettelmann was married in 1930 to Emma Helene Laufenberg. They had three children, one son and two daughters, and lived in Silver Spring. He died September 16, 1976, at the age of 69.

== Architectural works ==
=== Murphy & Locraft, 1954–1957 ===
- Marine Memorial Chapel, Marine Corps Base Quantico, Quantico, Virginia (1955–57)
- St. Luke Catholic Church, 4925 E Capitol St SE, Washington, D.C. (1956–57)

=== Thomas H. Locraft & Associates, 1957–1959 ===
- McGivney Hall, Catholic University, Washington, D.C. (1957)
- Edmund A. Walsh Building, Georgetown University, Washington, D.C. (1958)
- Elstad Auditorium, Gallaudet University, Washington, D.C. (1959–63)
- Elizabeth Seton High School, 5715 Emerson St, Bladensburg, Maryland (1959)

=== Thomas H. Locraft Associates, 1959–1964 ===
- Sister Helen Sheehan Library, Trinity Washington University, Washington, D.C. (1961–63)
- Our Lady of Sorrows Catholic Church, 1006 Larch Ave, Takoma Park, Maryland (1963)

=== Goettelmann & Xepapas, 1964–1976 ===
- Robert M. McClintock house, Washington, D.C. (1968, unlocated)
- Hartke Theatre, (Note: Designed in association with Allard & Joutz.) Catholic University, Washington, D.C. (1969–70)
- St. Katherine Greek Orthodox Church, 3149 Glen Carlyn Rd, Falls Church, Virginia (1969)
- Catholic Church of the Holy Spirit, 1717 Ritchie Rd, Forestville, Maryland (1970)
- Our Lady of Good Counsel Catholic Church, 8601 Wolftrap Rd SE, Vienna, Virginia (1971–73)
