= Judith Harrison =

American Tribologist and chemistry professor

Judith A. Harrison
- Education: University of New Hampshire
- Known for: Advancing the field of nanotribology by pioneering numerical methods that take into account chemical reactions.
- Awards: STLE Fellow (2018) Navy Superior Civilian Service Award (2014)
- Scientific career
- Fields: Computational Chemistry, Nanotribology, Physical Chemistry
- Workplaces: US Naval Academy, Naval Research Laboratory
- Doctoral advisor: Howard R. Mayne
- Other academic advisors: Donald W. Brenner
- Website: www.usna.edu/Users/chemistry/jah/index.php

Judith A. Harrison is an American physical chemist and tribologist who is known for pioneering numerical methods that incorporate chemical reactions into modeling studies. She is a professor in the Department of Chemistry at the United States Naval Academy in Annapolis, Maryland.

== Education ==
Harrison attended the University of New Hampshire, and completed a Ph.D in computational quantum chemistry on gas-phase reaction dynamics under the supervision of H.R. Mayne in 1989.

== Career ==
After a yearlong post-doctoral appointment at Duke University, Harrison joined the research group of Carter White and Richard Colton at the Naval Research Laboratory (NRL) as an American Society of Engineering Education postdoctoral associate She joined the chemistry department at the United States Naval Academy as an assistant professor, and was subsequently promoted to the ranks of associate professor and full professor. She has also held visiting scientist appointments at Johns Hopkins University and the University of Pennsylvania.

Harrison currently serves on the editorial board of Tribology Letters. She has held a variety of leadership, educational, and advisory roles in the AVS and STLE, and is the Vice-Chair for the 2022 Gordon Research Conference on Tribology.

== Research and publications ==
Harrison studies friction at the molecular level and runs simulations to unravel the molecular origins of friction and wear. She has published on topics that include Nanotribology, Molecular dynamics, AIREBO, Nanomechanics, Wear, Nanoindentation, Friction, Diamond and Mechanical properties. At NRL she began working with D.W. Brenner, who had recently reported a formalism for a potential energy surface now known as the "Brenner Potential". The potential was initially formulated for hydrocarbons in order to model diamond film deposition, but soon proved to be applicable to other scientific problems. Utilizing this potential and with a focus on diamond surfaces, Harrison was the lead author reporting on a number of pioneering accomplishments with Brenner and co-workers at NRL while she was at the Naval Academy. These include the first use of molecular dynamics to study atomic-scale friction and adhesion between sliding solids, the first reported simulation of a tribochemistry, and the first report of frictional energy dissipation with the use of molecular dynamics.

Her two most cited works have been cited over 3400 times each:

- A second-generation reactive empirical bond order (REBO) potential energy expression for hydrocarbons

DW Brenner, OA Shenderova, JA Harrison, SJ Stuart, B Ni, SB Sinnott, Journal of Physics: Condensed Matter, 2002

- A reactive potential for hydrocarbons with intermolecular interactions

SJ Stuart, AB Tutein, JA Harrison, The Journal of Chemical Physics, 2000

== Honors and awards ==
- 2000 Naval Academy's Research Excellence Award
- 2000, 2018 Navy Meritorious Civilian Service Award
- 2011 Fellow of the American Vacuum Society, "For unraveling the complex mechanics of atomic scale friction through modeling and simulations, and developing reactive empirical bond-order potentials that take into account chemical reactions."
- 2014 Navy Superior Civilian Service Award
- 2009 George Braude Award
- 2018 Fellow, Society of Tribologists and Lubrication Engineers
- 2020 Kinnear endowed Fellow of Chemistry
