= Firebaugh =

Firebaugh may refer to:

== People ==
- Andrew D. Firebaugh, California pioneer, founder of Firebaugh, California
- Douglas Firebaugh, an author
- Francille Firebaugh, former professor and dean emerita of the College of Human Ecology at Cornell University
- Marco Antonio Firebaugh, former Assemblyman
- Samara Firebaugh, electrical engineer and academic administrator
- W. C. Firebaugh, an author

== Places ==
- Firebaugh, California
- Firebaugh Airport
- Marco Antonio Firebaugh High School

== Fictional ==
- Wanda Firebaugh, a character in the webcomic Erfworld
