= Navy Meritorious Public Service Award =

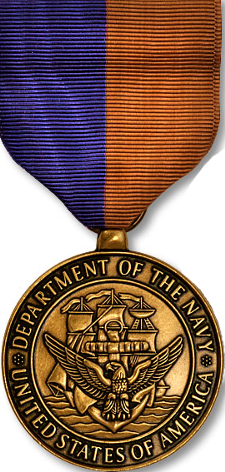
- Medal of the award
- Type: Civil decoration
- Awarded for: Significant contributions with substantial impact upon a specific activity or geographical location
- Country: United States
- Presented by: Echelon II level commanders or higher
- Eligibility: Private citizens not employed by the Department of the Navy
- Status: Active
- Ribbon bar of the award

Precedence
- Next (higher): Navy Superior Public Service Award
- Next (lower): Navy Award of Merit for Group Achievement
- Related: Navy Meritorious Civilian Service Award

The Navy Meritorious Public Service Award is the third highest award that the United States Department of the Navy can present to private civilians not employed by the department. Like the other Navy Public Service Awards, it is generally awarded to business and civic leaders, scientists and other civilians who have made outstanding voluntary contributions to the mission and best interests of the Department of the Navy. It recognizes significant contributions with substantial impact upon a specific activity or geographical location. This award may be bestowed upon civilians by all Echelon I and II commanders, or above; and, is in rare cases signed and approved by the Secretary of the Navy.

== Design ==
The medal, designed by the United States Mint, is bronze in color. The obverse has the Seal of the Department of the Navy, encircled by the inscription above "DEPARTMENT OF THE NAVY" and below, "UNITED STATES OF AMERICA." The reverse has the words "Awarded to" with a blank tablet for inscription of the recipient's name, resting on a spray of laurel. Arched at the top rim of the reverse of the medal is the word "MERITORIOUS." Horizontally, below the tablet, is the word "PUBLIC" and arched along the bottom rim is the word "SERVICE." The medal is suspended by a ribbon using divided in half vertically with blue on the left, and copper on the right.

== Recipients ==
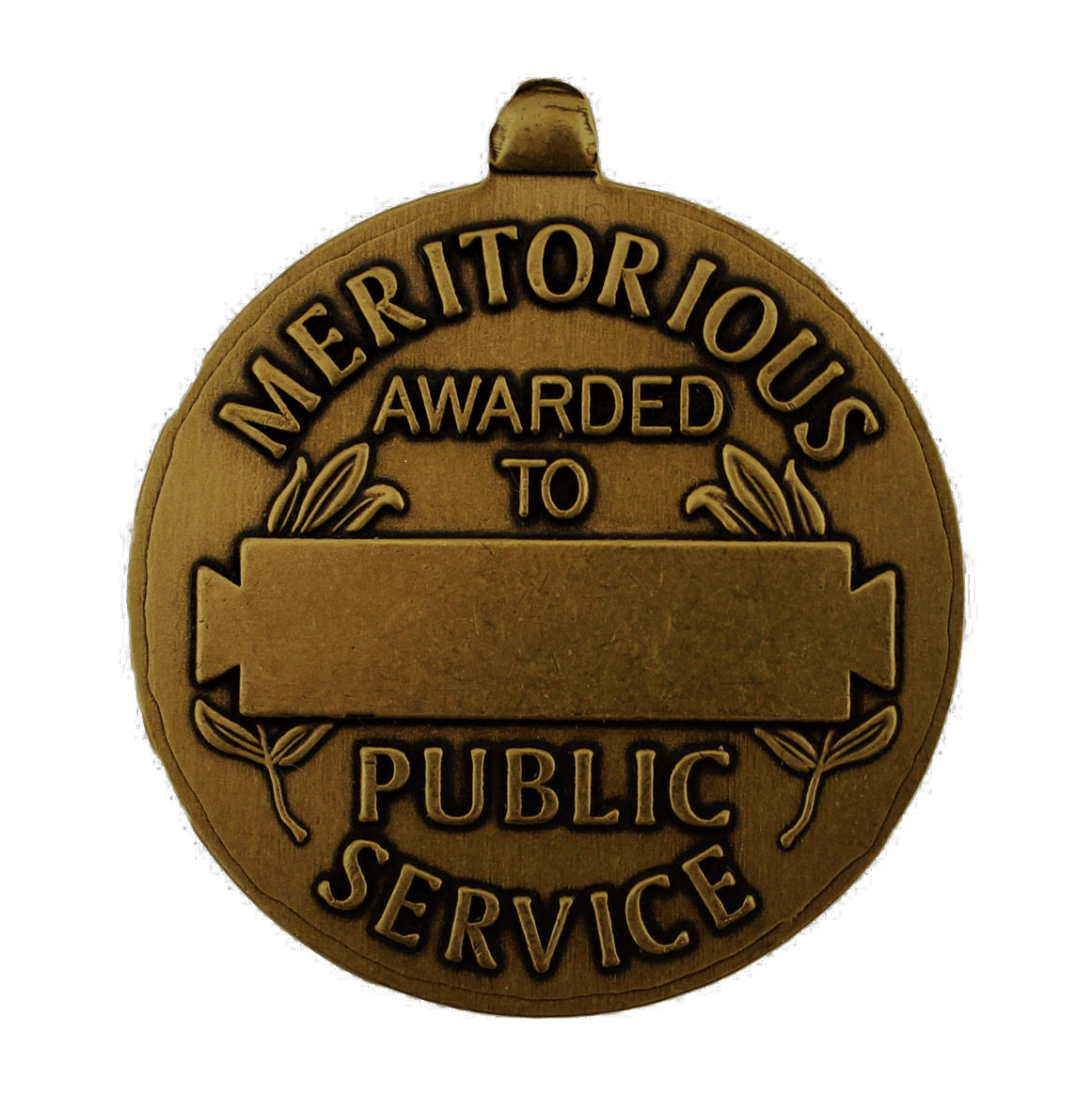
Reverse of the medal

The award is available for private citizens and organizations who have performed outstanding voluntary contributions for the Department of the Navy, within the last five years. The contributions must have had a significant and substantial impact upon a specific activity or geographical location. With the exception of senior Department officials in non-career or appointive positions, only individuals or groups who were not employed by the Department during the time of their contributions are eligible for selection. Recipients of the award are presented with the full-size medal, in addition to a miniature medal, a mounted ribbon, and a lapel pin. Also included with the award is a certificate signed by the commanding officer authorizing the award. Nominations for the award are considered by the Department's Board of Decorations and Medals. This award is bestowable by all Echelon I and II commanders, or above; and is in rare cases is signed and approved by the Secretary of the Navy. If the award was earned prior to entrance into the Naval Service, or while under a U.S. Navy Reserve contract during off-duty (civilian) hours, it may not be worn on the military uniform.

=== Notable Recipients ===
- Geophysicist J. Lamar Worzel received the award for his assistance in the April 1963 search and recovery of the USS Thresher, the world's first nuclear submarine lost at sea, which had sunk to a depth of 8,400 ft (2,600 m) around 350 km east of Cape Cod in the North Atlantic.
- Franklin R. Parker the 18th Assistant Secretary of the Navy for Manpower and Reserve Affairs, was bestowed with the award in 2011 for his work in advising the General Counsel and Navy Secretariat on a range of legal issues impacting the Navy and its personnel.
- Gerald A. Cann, the first Assistant Secretary of the Navy for Research, Development and Acquisition, was also a recipient of the award.
- Stephen M. Carmel, the 21st Administrator of the United States Maritime Administration was a recipient in 2017.

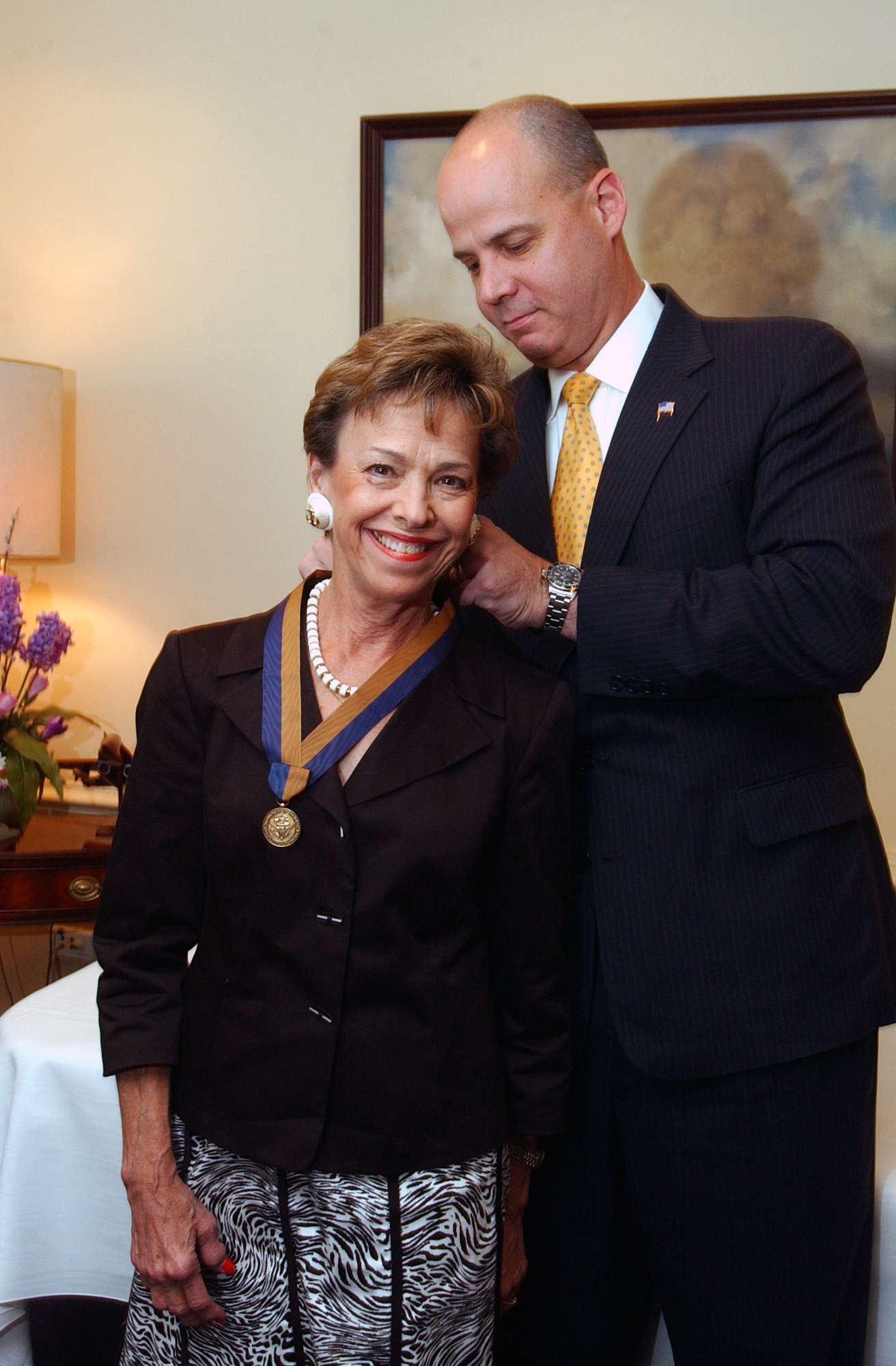
Under Secretary of the Navy, Dino Aviles, presents the Navy Meritorious Public Service Award to Margaret Dalton, former President of the Society of Sponsors.

== See also ==
- Navy Superior Civilian Service Award
