= Samara Firebaugh =

American electrical engineer and academic administrator

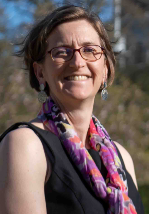
- Education: Princeton University; Massachusetts Institute of Technology
- Scientific career
- Fields: Electrical engineering
- Workplaces: United States Naval Academy
- Doctoral advisor: Martin A. Schmidt

Samara L. Firebaugh is an American electrical engineer and academic administrator who serving as the academic dean and provost of the United States Naval Academy. She assumed the position in July 2023, after previously serving as associate provost for academic affairs. In February 2025, her administration drew national attention for issuing guidance restricting the use of specific terminology regarding race and gender in classroom materials to align with federal Executive Orders.

== Education ==
Firebaugh attended Princeton University, where she initially struggled academically during her first semester. She recovered to graduate magna cum laude in 1995 with a B.S. in electrical engineering, receiving a prize at graduation for being the most improved student in the department.

Firebaugh continued her studies at the Massachusetts Institute of Technology (MIT), supported by a National Science Foundation Graduate Fellowship. She earned her M.S. in electrical engineering in 1997 with a thesis titled Theoretical and Experimental Investigation of Micro-Chemical Analysis Systems. She completed Ph.D. in electrical engineering at MIT in 2001. Her doctoral thesis, Miniaturization and Integration of Photoacoustic Detection, was supervised by Martin A. Schmidt and read by Anantha P. Chandrakasan. During her doctoral studies, Firebaugh was supported by an Intel Foundation Graduate Fellowship.

== Career ==
Firebaugh joined the faculty of the United States Naval Academy (USNA) in 2001 as an assistant professor in the electrical and computer engineering department. Over the next two decades, she held leadership positions within the academy, including chair of the electrical and computer engineering department and vice president of the faculty senate.

During her tenure as a faculty member, Firebaugh was involved in STEM outreach, co-instituting a technology camp at the USNA designed to encourage girls to consider careers in engineering. Her teaching efforts were recognized with several awards, including the Raouf Award for Excellence in Engineering Teaching in 2012 and the Class of 1951 Civilian Faculty Teaching Excellence Award in 2014. She also received the Meritorious Civilian Service Award. In 2017, she was elevated to the grade of senior member of the Institute of Electrical and Electronics Engineers (IEEE).

On July 1, 2020, Firebaugh was appointed associate provost for academic affairs at the USNA. In this capacity, she served as the principal assistant for matters regarding curriculum and classroom instruction, with specific oversight of scheduling, registration, validation, and academic advising. She received the Navy Superior Civilian Service Award in 2022.

In July 2023, Firebaugh was appointed as the academic dean and provost of the Naval Academy, the institution's chief academic officer. She succeeded Andrew T. Phillips.

In February 2025, Firebaugh's office issued an internal directive to faculty prohibiting the use of classroom materials that teach concepts such as systemic racism and sexism. The guidance instructed faculty to search their course materials for terms including diversity, minority, bias, representation, and oppression. The directive explicitly banned materials teaching "critical race theory, intersectionality, privilege, patriarchy or other such theories", and instructed faculty to avoid asking students for their preferred pronouns. The Academy stated that Firebaugh's email was intended to provide detailed guidance to ensure alignment with federal Executive Orders.

In September 2026, the USNA announced that civilians could no longer be appointed at the United States’ military service academies. Secretary Pete Hegseth presumably would not remove this designation from presiding faculty members such as Firebaugh.
