= Catholic University School of Architecture and Planning =

Architecture school at the Catholic University of America

School of Architecture and Planning
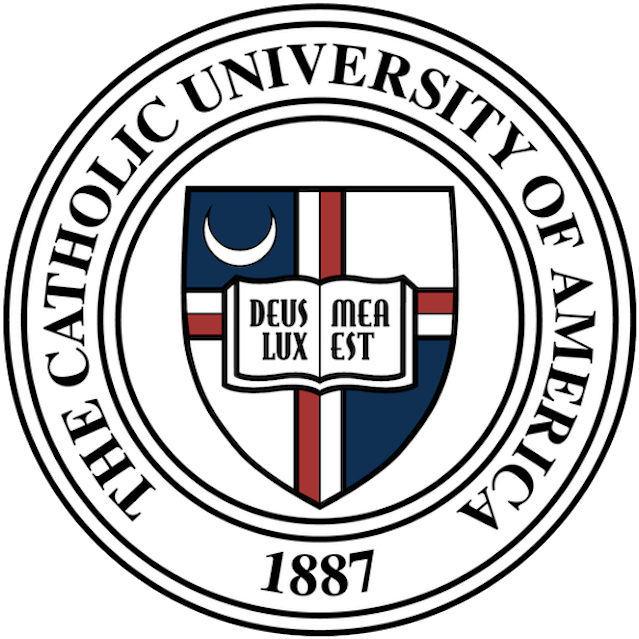
- Parent institution: Catholic University of America
- Affiliation: Catholic
- Dean: Mark Ferguson
- Location: Washington D.C., U.S.
- Website: architecture.catholic.edu

The Catholic University School of Architecture and Planning is one of the twelve schools at Catholic University of America, located in Washington, D.C. (USA).

== History ==
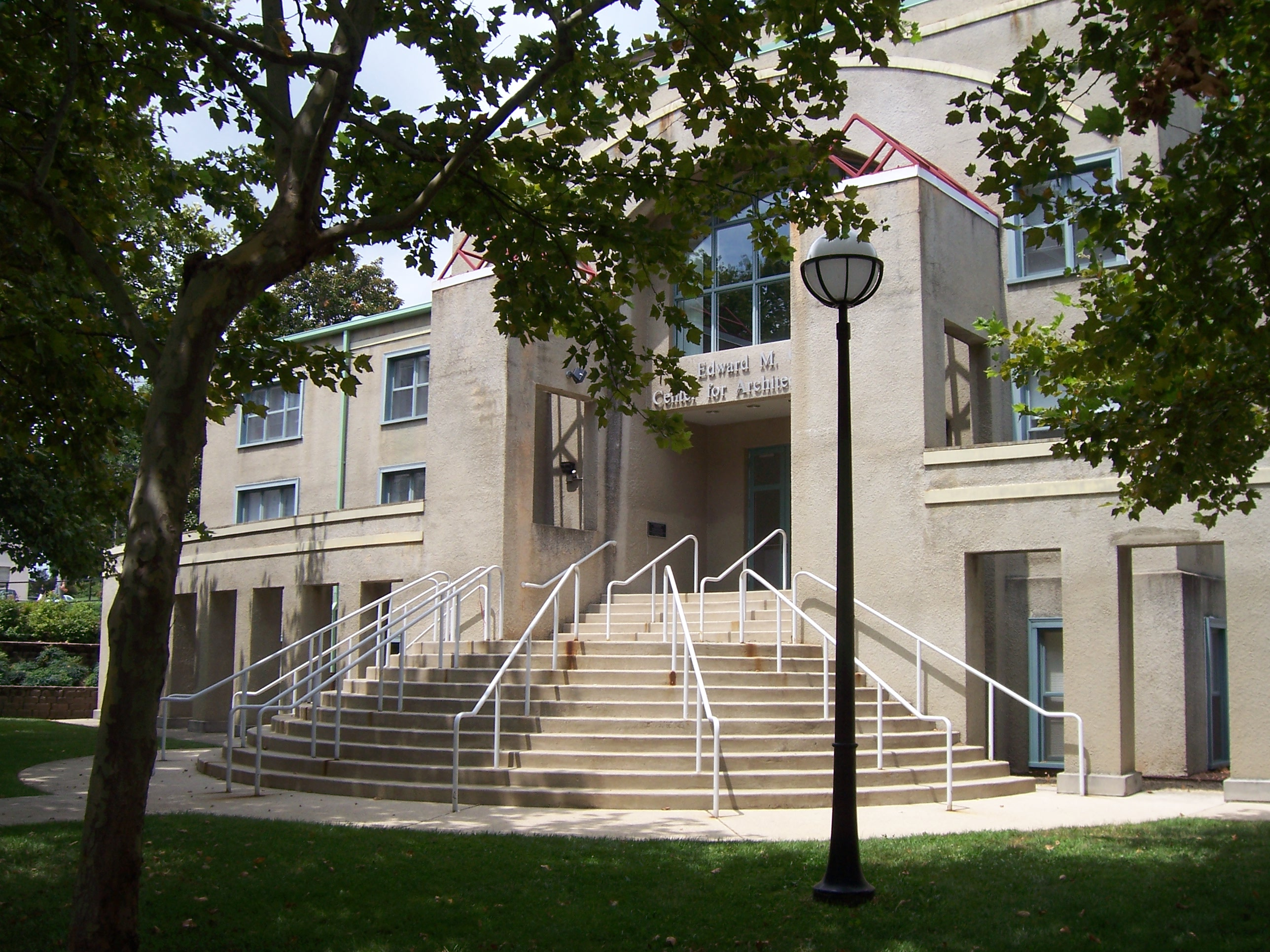
The building

Established as a department in 1911 by Frederick V. Murphy, a École des Beaux-Arts graduate, the department remained in McMahon Hall until after World War I, when Murphy was succeeded by Thomas H. Locraft in 1949 and the growing department moved into the Social Center on the top floor of the old gymnasium. In 1947, returning World War II veterans forced a second move to the Navy Barracks. In 1959, Dr. Paul A. Goettelmann became the third chair of the department, and in 1961 the department was moved to the third floor of Pangborn Hall, home of the School of Engineering, when the temporary Navy Barracks building was demolished. Next chairs were professors Forrest Wilson, Peter Blake and Stanley Hallet. The old gym was renovated in 1989 with John V. Yanik AIA as Associate Architect For Design and Vlastimil Koubek as the Architect of Record, for the conversion of the entire building into the Department of Architecture later the School of Architecture and Planning - CUArch.

== Honor society ==
Tau Sigma Delta has a chapter at the school, Beta Phi Chapter.
