= Montel Williams =

American television host and actor (born 1956)

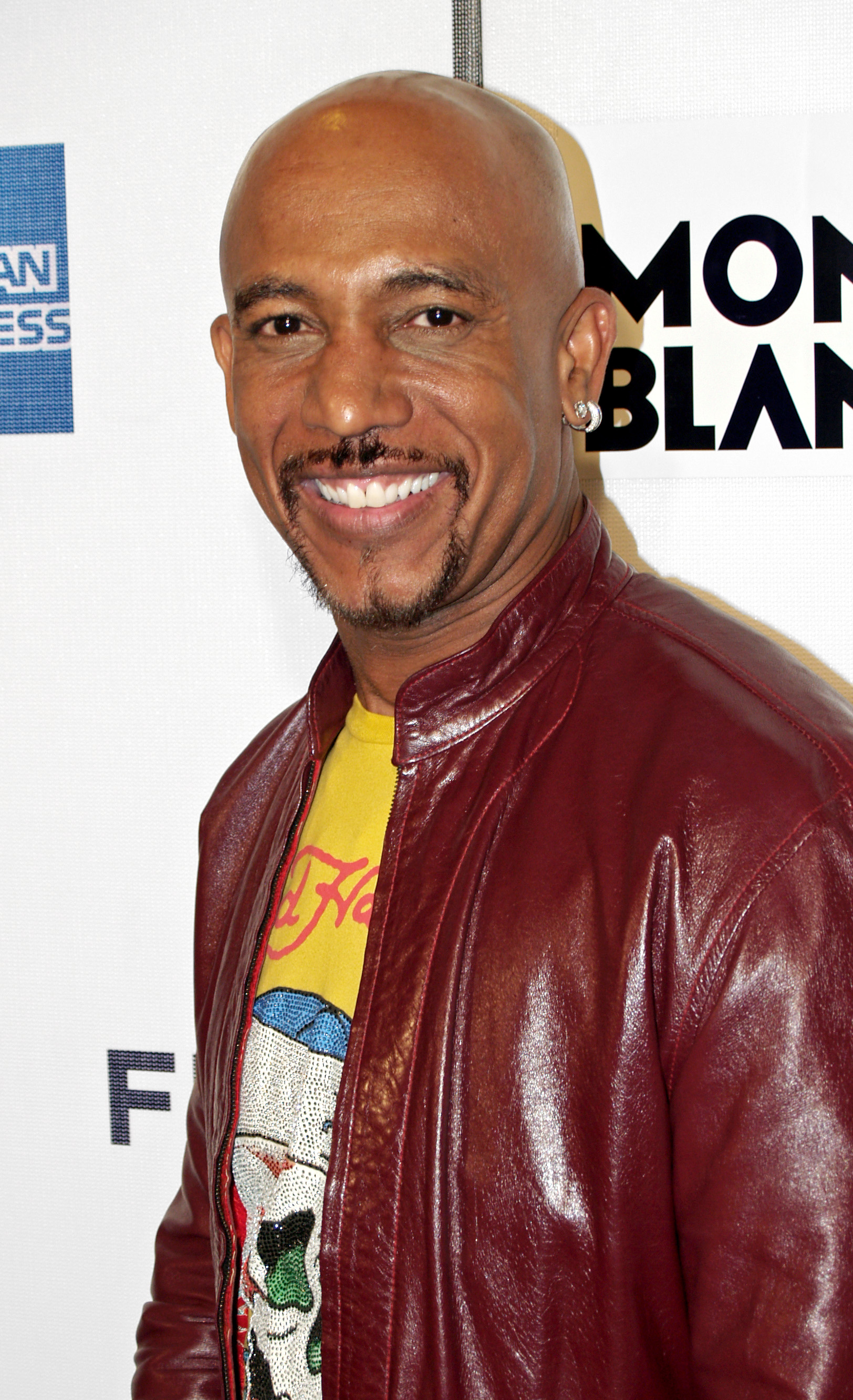
- Williams at the 2008 Tribeca Film Festival
- Born: Montel Brian Anthony Williams; July 3, 1956 (age 70); Baltimore, Maryland, U.S.
- Education: United States Naval Academy (BS)
- Occupations: Television host, actor, motivational speaker
- Spouses: Rochele See (m. 1982; div. 1989) Grace Morley (m. 1992; div. 2000) Tara Fowler (m. 2007)
- Children: 4
- Military career
- Allegiance: United States
- Branch: United States Marine Corps; United States Navy
- Service years: 1974–1996
- Rank: Lieutenant commander
- Units: Naval Intelligence; Naval Security Group
- Awards: Meritorious Service Medal; Navy Expeditionary Medal; Navy Superior Public Service Award

Montel Brian Anthony Williams (born July 3, 1956) is an American television host and actor. He is known for hosting the daytime tabloid talk show The Montel Williams Show, which ran in syndication from 1991 to 2008. He currently hosts The Balancing Act and Military Makeover with Montel airing on Lifetime. Williams founded the Montel Williams MS Foundation after being diagnosed with multiple sclerosis in 1999. He is noted for his service in both the United States Marine Corps and the United States Navy, from which he retired after 22 years of service.

== Early life and education ==
Born in Baltimore, Maryland, on July 3, 1956, Williams attended Andover High School in neighboring Linthicum, Maryland, where he was elected president of his class in both his junior and senior years. He was a good student, athlete, and musician, and he was active in countywide student government issues in Annapolis, Maryland.

Williams was raised as a Roman Catholic and served as an altar server in the Catholic Church.

Montel's father, Herman Williams Jr., was a firefighter who in 1992 became Baltimore's first African American fire chief. Montel's mother is biracial.

== Career ==
=== Military ===
Williams enlisted in the United States Marine Corps in 1974. He completed the one-year Naval Academy Preparatory School course and then Marine four-year officer training program at the U.S. Naval Academy.

He graduated in 1980 with a degree in general engineering and a minor in international security affairs. He completed naval cryptologic officer training, and spent 18 months in Guam as a cryptologic officer for naval intelligence. He was later supervising cryptologic officer with the Naval Security Fleet Support Division at Fort Meade, Maryland. There, Williams worked for the National Security Agency, where he was involved in the U.S. invasion of Grenada in 1983, known as Operation Urgent Fury. On several occasions, he worked to secure the release of United States citizens—typically military personnel who had been captured in foreign lands—returned to U.S. soil. After 17 years of active duty and five more as a reservist, Williams retired in 1996 from the Naval Reserve at the rank of lieutenant commander after 22 years of service. His awards include two Meritorious Service Medals, two Navy Commendation Medals, the National Defense Service Medal, the Navy Achievement Medal, two Navy Expeditionary Medals, the Armed Forces Expeditionary Medal, and two Humanitarian Service Medals.

As a civilian, Willams was again honored in 2008 with a Navy Superior Public Service Award for his "continuous support and recognition of Sailors, Marines and their families throughout his 17 years on television".

=== The Montel Williams Show ===
Williams began The Montel Williams Show (syndicated by CBS Television Distribution) in 1991. In 1996, Williams received a Daytime Emmy Award for Outstanding Talk Show Host. Ratings for the show peaked during the 1996–97 season, with a 4.4 average rating. He was again nominated for Outstanding Talk Show Host in 2002, and the Montel Williams Show was nominated for Outstanding Talk Show in 2001 and 2002.

On January 30, 2008, Variety reported that CBS TV Distribution had terminated The Montel Williams Show when key Fox-owned stations chose not to renew it for the 2008–09 season. On May 16, 2008, the last episode of The Montel Williams Show aired. Speculation followed the end of The Montel Williams Show, which was canceled immediately after Williams criticized mainstream news media's preference for stories about Hollywood stars over those about military personnel and events. Commentators felt his statements may have alienated the Fox TV Network.

On November 10, 2010, Oprah Winfrey invited Williams, along with former talk show hosts Phil Donahue, Geraldo Rivera, Ricki Lake, and Sally Jessy Raphael, as guests on her show. This was the first time that the fellow talkers had appeared together since their programs left the air.

Williams' work has been criticized by the Independent Investigations Group, which declared The Montel Williams Show to be noteworthy Truly Terrible Television with its satirical TTTV award (for similar reasons, awarded to "every episode featuring Sylvia Browne").

Controversial self-declared psychic Sylvia Browne featured frequently on The Montel Williams Show from 1991 until its finale in 2008. Williams described Browne as "the most-appearing guest on a talk show in the history of television" and "the longest-running guest in daytime television", and her appearances included particularly controversial incidents relating to kidnap victims Shawn Hornbeck and Amanda Berry. Williams was criticized for allowing his high-profile show to serve as a channel for Browne, and in 2015, two years after Berry was rescued, Williams apologized to her for "anything said on my show [that] caused her pain." In February 2019, an episode of Last Week Tonight with John Oliver featured a segment on television psychics and Williams' association with Browne was criticized.

=== Acting ===
Williams has also guest-starred in episodic television and off-Broadway plays. Among other roles, he portrayed a Navy SEAL, Lieutenant Curtis Rivers, in three episodes of the television series JAG. He also produced and starred in a short-lived television series called Matt Waters, which appeared on CBS in 1996. He played an ex-Navy SEAL turned inner-city high school teacher. In 1997, he played Lt Col Northrop, a USAF nuclear missile silo commander, in the fictional movie The Peacekeeper. In 2002, he played the judge presiding over Erica Kane's (Susan Lucci) murder trial on the ABC soap opera All My Children. In 2003, he made a guest appearance on the soap as himself to promote an episode of his own show on which several AMC stars were scheduled to appear. In 2004, he hosted American Candidate, a political reality show on Showtime. Williams has also guest-starred on The New Adventures of Robin Hood and Guiding Light.

Williams also appeared in a Perry Mason movie in 1993 titled The Case of the Telltale Talk Show Host. His character, Boomer Kelly, was a former football player who was appearing on a radio talk show whose owner was found murdered. He was also a voice actor in 2008 in the political satire film War, Inc., providing the voice of the main character's GPS tracking device/counselor.

On October 1, 2019, Williams appeared in an episode of the Fox drama The Resident entitled, "Flesh of My Flesh". Williams played himself, as a TV personality covering a nearly impossible cancer surgery being performed on an adoptive mother of seven.

=== Production ===
Williams produced and narrated the Starline Films documentary film 4CHOSEN: The Documentary, which tells the story about the New Jersey Turnpike shooting in 1998, and the racial profiling case that followed the incident. In 1999, Williams directed the film, Little Pieces, starring Grace Morley and Amy Acton.

=== Spokesperson ===
Williams was a national spokesman of the Partnership for Prescription Assistance (PPA), a patient-assistance program clearinghouse that helps low-income patients apply for free or reduced-price prescription drugs. On November 30, 2007, while in Savannah, Georgia, to promote PPA, he threatened reporters following an earlier interview at which Courtney Scott, a 17-year-old high school intern reporter for the Savannah Morning News, had asked him whether restriction of pharmaceutical profits would discourage research and development of new drugs. Angered by the question, Williams retorted: "I'm trying to figure out exactly why you are here and what the interview is about", and subsequently terminated that videotaped interview; Williams later ran into Scott in his hotel and approached her, reportedly saying: "Don't look at me like that. Do you know who I am? I'm a big star, and I can look you up, find where you live and blow you up."

Williams's public-relations representatives later apologized for his hostile outburst in an issued statement: "I mistakenly thought the reporter and photographer in question were at the hotel to confront me about some earlier comments. I was wrong, and I apologize for my overreaction". In 2010 Williams became chief spokesman for the Poker Training Network, now Card Geniuses, a MLM-based poker instruction and playing website.

==== Payday loan controversy ====
Williams was a paid spokesperson for MoneyMutual, a lead generator for a payday lending service. In early 2015, a controversy around this position erupted when an education activist, André-Tascha Lammé, accused Williams on Twitter of supporting a company that harms African-American consumers. Williams denied the allegations, stating that Lammé was fundamentally incorrect in his assessment of the loans and their terms. The New York State Department of Financial Services then investigated the claims, and Benjamin Lawsky issued a statement on March 10 that it "made no finding of a violation of law by Mr. Williams". He added that the department had found that "Using Mr. Williams's reputation as a trusted celebrity endorser, MoneyMutual marketed loans to struggling consumers with sky-high interest rates – sometimes in excess of 1,300 percent". SellingSource, the parent company, was fined $2.1 million and ordered to stop advertising to New Yorkers.

=== Campaigning ===
Williams is an outspoken advocate for US military veterans. He has publicly lobbied for government action to promptly resolve the Veterans Affairs scandal.

=== Other work ===
On April 6, 2009, Williams began hosting a daily radio show, Montel Across America, on Air America Media. On January 21, 2010, Air America ceased broadcasting, leaving Williams without a radio outlet.

Montel Williams was a paid celebrity spokesperson for MoneyMutual, a lead-generation company that referred borrowers to payday lenders offering short-term loans with typical APRs of 261% to 1,304% (sometimes exceeding 1,300%), products widely criticized for disproportionately targeting and harming low-income people; in 2015 the company paid a $2.1 million penalty to New York regulators and Williams agreed to stop endorsing its loans to New York consumers.

As of May 2009, he started hosting an infomercial for the Living Well Healthmaster, a blender product. It is presented under the title Living Well with Montel; the infomercial is structured similarly to his old talk show, featuring guests talking about their health problems, with the Healthmaster mixer being the solution. Later episodes of Living Well with Montel advertised a home pressure cooker and an identity theft protection service. In June 2010, Williams began doing infomercials for LifeLock, a security fraud company.

On October 1, 2014, Williams spoke in front of a Congressional committee in support of Marine Sgt. Andrew Tahmooressi, who was arrested in Tijuana, Baja California, for carrying guns across the U.S.-Mexican border.

Williams was once a Republican, leaving the political party in 1993 and registering as an independent. He is a supporter of LGBT rights. He endorsed Hillary Clinton for president as the superior choice, writing that Donald Trump posed a "clear and present danger" to the nation.

On September 2, 2021, Williams was appointed as a director on the board of Better for You Wellness, Inc.

=== CBD oil ===
Williams has marketed cannabidiol (also known as CBD oil) products. According to Forbes, Williams "spent years working to develop medicinal-quality CBD to treat his own multiple sclerosis".

== Personal life ==
Williams has two daughters, Ashley Williams (born 1984) and Maressa Williams (born 1988), with his first wife, Rochele See. Williams married Grace Morley, an exotic dancer on June 6, 1992. They have a son, Montel Brian Hank Williams (born 1993), and a daughter, Wyntergrace Williams (born 1994). The couple divorced in 2000.

In 2001, Williams briefly dated Kamala Harris, who later went on to become Vice President of the United States after future President, Joe Biden, won the 2020 election. Williams tweeted in 2020 that he had "'great respect'" for Harris.

In July 2006, Williams proposed to girlfriend Tara Fowler, an American Airlines flight attendant. They married before friends and family on a beach in Bermuda on October 6, 2007.

Williams participated in the 2007 World Series of Poker main event, and planned to donate any potential winnings to American families affected by the Iraq War. He was eliminated on Day 2. During the event, Williams also spoke out about the port security bill signed in 2006 that banned online gaming sites from accepting money transactions from the U.S.

Four months after making a guest appearance in an episode of Touched by an Angel, in 1999, Williams was diagnosed with multiple sclerosis. In the following year, Williams created the MS Foundation, a nonprofit organization with a focus on research and education. Williams has openly stated that he uses medical cannabis, stating it helps to ease his multiple sclerosis-caused neuropathic pain. Williams has become a vocal advocate of cannabis, supporting efforts to pass medical cannabis laws in the United States, as well as calling for full legalization. He has also said that snowboarding is his "best therapy" for multiple sclerosis, commenting, "When I stand up, I need first to hold on to something and think about the positioning of my legs. If I were to just start walking, I would fall. I have to get my brain to find my legs and then I will usually take a test step, but I say something at the time to anyone who might be watching to distract from what I'm really doing. Then I'll find places to grab as I walk and talk, sometimes even walking backwards because I have more control that way. People have no idea that I'm doing this. But when I'm snowboarding and my feet are strapped in, my brain seems to have a direct connection to my legs. After snowboarding, it's night and day for my balance and walking. There's a real physical change before I get up the mountain and when I come down. The benefits last for days."

Williams was hospitalized on May 30, 2018, when he had a cerebellar hemorrhagic stroke while working out at a gym.

== Bibliography ==
- Williams, Montel; Paisner, Daniel (February 1997). Mountain, Get Out Of My Way. Warner Books. ISBN 978-0-446-60417-8.
- Williams, Montel; Kramer, Jill (September 2000). Life Lessons and Reflections. Carlsbad, CA: Mountain Movers Press. ISBN 978-1-58825-001-8.
- Williams, Montel; Linguvic, Wini (June 1, 2001). BodyChange: The 21 Day Fitness Program for Changing Your Body and Changing Your Life (Softcover). Mountain Movers Press. ISBN 978-1-58825-004-9.
- Williams, Montel; Paisner, Daniel (October 1, 2001). A Dozen Ways to Sunday. Mountain Movers Press. ISBN 978-1-58825-005-6.
- Williams, Montel; Linguvic, Wini (October 1, 2003). BodyChange: The 21 Day Fitness Program for Changing Your Body and Changing Your Life (Hardcover). Carlsbad, CA: Hay House. ISBN 978-1-4019-0314-5.
- Williams, Montel; Grobel, Lawrence (January 4, 2005). Climbing Higher. NAL Trade. ISBN 978-0-451-21398-3.
- Williams, Montel; Fisher, David (May 20, 2025). Sailing the Intrepid: The Incredible Wartime Voyage of the Navy's Iconic Aircraft Carrier. Hanover Square Press. ISBN 978-1-335-08103-2.
