= Meritorious Civilian Service Award =

Civil award

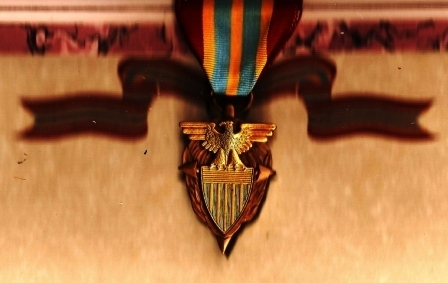
Defense Logistics Agency Meritorious Civilian Service Award medal

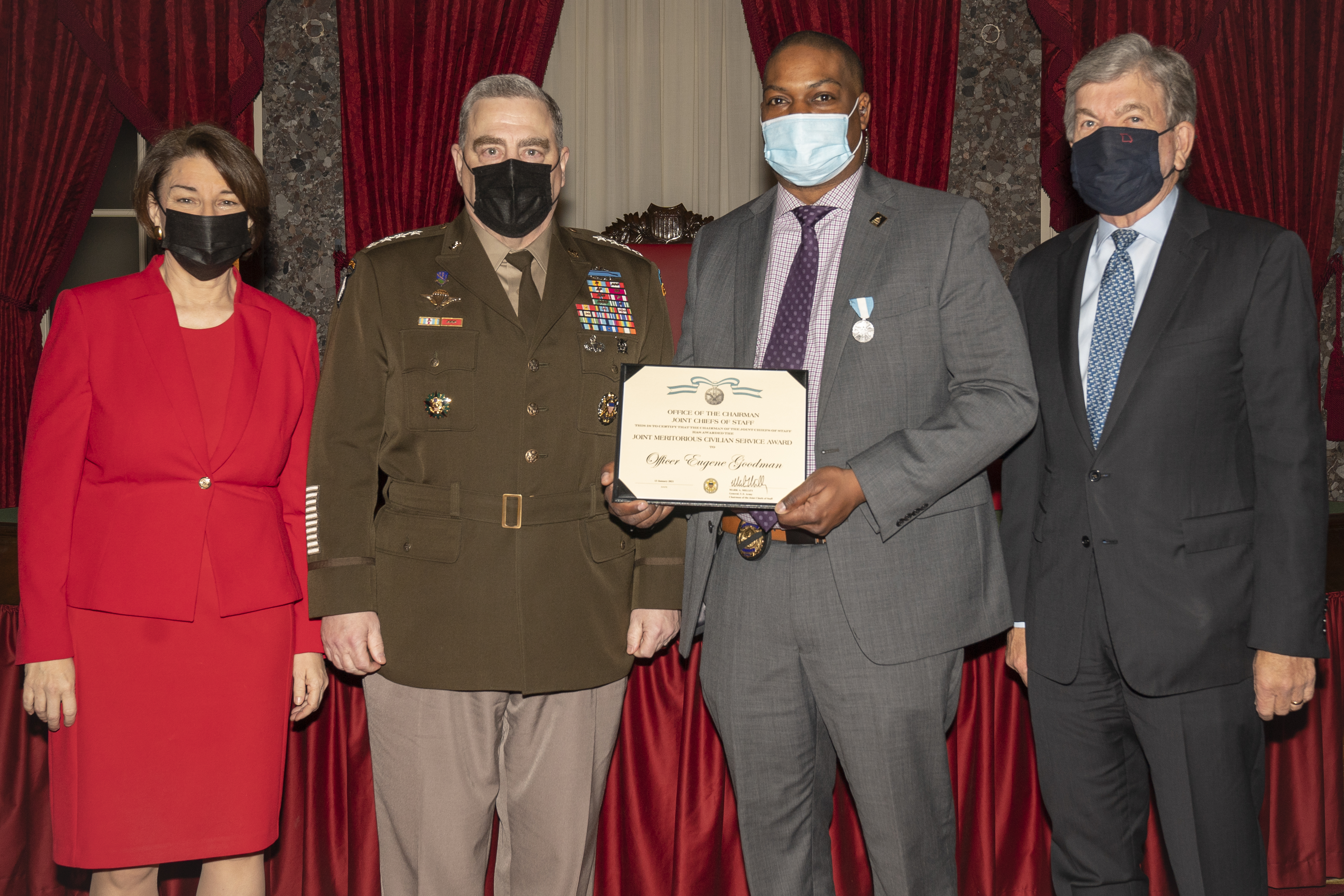
Police officer Eugene Goodman, who diverted protesters during the 2021 storming of the United States Capitol, being presented with the award.

The Meritorious Civilian Service Award is commonly the highest award granted by U.S. Army Commanders (Major General and above, or civilian equivalent). The Award and Medal is provided to civilian employees within agencies of the federal government of the United States. However, the various agencies' awards are not directly comparable. For example, the US Army Meritorious Civilian Service Award is equivalent to the US military Legion of Merit, while the US Air Force Meritorious Civilian Service Award is equivalent to the lower US military Meritorious Service Medal.

Examples of Meritorious Civilian Service Awards include but are not limited to:

- Secretary of Defense Meritorious Civilian Service Award
- Chairman of the Joint Chiefs of Staff (CJCS) Joint Meritorious Civilian Service Medal
- Department of the Army Meritorious Civilian Service Award (third highest award)
- Navy Meritorious Civilian Service Award (third highest award)
- Air Force Meritorious Civilian Service Award (fourth highest award)

== Armed Forces ==
=== Army Meritorious Civilian Service Award ===
The Meritorious Civilian Service Award is the third highest award granted by U.S. Army Commanders (Major General and above, or civilian equivalent). It consists of a medal, lapel button, and citation certificate. Nominees must have established a pattern of excellence, normally demonstrated by the receipt of lower level awards. It is equivalent to the military Legion of Merit.

=== Air Force Meritorious Service Award ===
Application submitted through Installation Awards Committee and approved at MAJCOM level. Consists of a sterling silver medal bearing the Air Force coat of arms within a wreath of laurel leaves. The ribbon is light blue with 4 gold and 3 dark blue stripes in the center. A silver lapel emblem, miniature medal and AF Form 1166, Award for Meritorious Civilian Service accompanies the award. The emblem with a ruby indicates receipt of more than one meritorious award.

=== Navy Meritorious Civilian Service Award ===
Award consists of a certificate and citation signed by the activity head, medal and lapel emblem. The award is the third highest Navy civilian award, ranking behind the Navy Superior Civilian Service Award.

== See also ==
- Awards and decorations of the United States government
