= Navy Distinguished Civilian Service Award =

U.S. Navy civilian medal

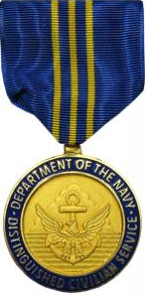
- Department of the Navy Distinguished Civilian Service Medal
- Awarded for: Distinguished and/or extraordinary services to the Department of the Navy that far exceed the contributions and service of others with comparable responsibilities
- Country: United States
- Presented by: Department of the Navy
- Eligibility: Civilian employees of the Department of the Navy and Marine Corps
- Status: Active
- Ribbon bar of the award

Precedence
- Next (lower): Navy Superior Civilian Service Award

The Navy Distinguished Civilian Service Award is the highest honorary award the Secretary of the Navy can confer on a Department of the Navy civilian employee.

== Criteria ==
The Navy Distinguished Civilian Service Award will be granted only to those employees who have given distinguished or extraordinary service. The achievements or service must be truly exceptional when measured against the position requirements of the employee and should far exceed the contributions and service of others with comparable responsibilities. The Navy Distinguished Civilian Service Award is reserved for contributions that are so unusual or significant that recognition at the secretary of the Navy level is deserved. Additional qualifiers include:

- A pattern of long-term, sustained high performance as evidenced by the employee having previously received high honorary awards (e.g., Navy Superior Civilian Service Award, the Navy Meritorious Civilian Service Award or similar awards or honors).
- Career achievements that are recognized throughout the Department of the Navy.
- Indications of innovative leadership of highly successful programs or projects that had impact beyond the employee's command.
- Accomplishments or achievements that have had, as a minimum, a wide impact in the Department of the Navy.
- Scientific or technical advances, or suggestions of significant value.
- Accomplishments that show unusual management abilities, innovative thinking, and/or outstanding leadership, which benefit the Department of the Navy.
- Responsibility for major cost savings, reductions or avoidance.
- Unusual acts of heroism.
- Exceptional cooperative efforts with other Navy offices, federal agencies, or the private sector.

== Sources ==
- US Marine Corps System Command website
- USA Military Medals.com
