= Holy Comforter-St. Cyprian Catholic Church (Washington, D.C.) =

Church in Washington, D.C.

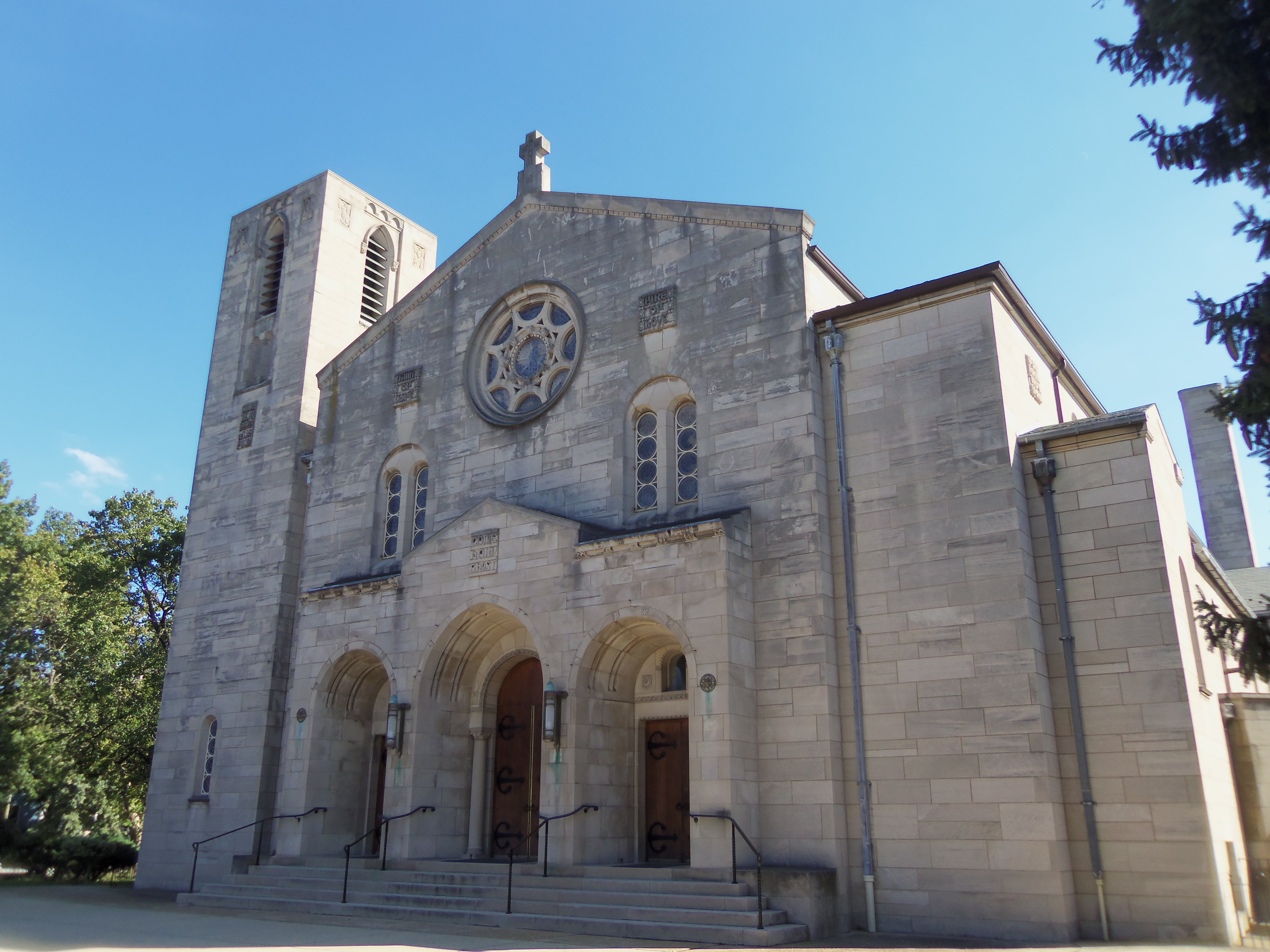
- Holy Comforter-St. Cyprian Catholic Church
- Holy Comforter-St. Cyprian Catholic Church
- 38.889558°N 76.986046°W
- Location: 1357 East Capitol Street SE, Washington, D.C.
- Country: United States
- Denomination: Catholic
- Website: hcscchurch.org

Administration
- Archdiocese: Roman Catholic Archdiocese of Washington

Clergy
- Pastor: Msgr Charles Pope

Holy Comforter-St. Cyprian is a Black Catholic parish in Washington, D.C. established in 1966 by the merger of the predominately African-American St. Cyprian Catholic Church (est 1893) and the predominantly White Holy Comforter Catholic Church (est 1904).

The church is located at 1357 East Capitol Street in the Hill East neighborhood. It is near Lincoln Park and the Eastern Market and Stadium-Armory metro stations.

== History ==
=== Background ===
==== Holy Comforter ====
Builders broke ground on Holy Comforter on July 31, 1937, at Fourteenth and East Capitol Street. The plans anticipated a budget of $200,000 and construction timeline of ten months. Archbishop Michael J. Curley of Baltimore and Washington dedicated the Holy Comforter on December 3, 1939, at an event attended by 1,200. Cardinal Gibbon presided over a second dedication of the completed building on March 18, 1906. The architect, B. Stanley Simmons, reportedly found inspiration from the Spanish Mission style design in an old mission house in San Diego, California.

==== St. Cyprian ====
In 1890, a group of African-American Catholics living on Capitol Hill convinced the Archdiocese of Baltimore to build St. Cyprian after being discriminated against by St. Peter's church which had segregated them from the rest of the congregation in the basement. St. Cyprian church was originally built at 13th and C streets SE in 1893, named for St. Thaddeus Cyprian, an African bishop and martyr.

=== Merged parish ===
In the 1950s in Washington, DC, a great number of affluent white people moved from the District to the suburbs, causing the congregation of Holy Comforter to diminish and causing St. Cyprian's congregation to flourish.

In 1966, with little regard for St. Cyprian's wishes, Cardinal Patrick O'Boyle, the Archbishop of Washington, merged St. Cyprian and Holy Comforter. According to Fr Robert M. Kearns, the merger had made the members of the church feel "raped or emasculated. There was nothing left," because "they weren't consulted properly." St. Cyprian was given two weeks to vacate the church and it was torn down to build houses and a small park.

After the merger, Holy Comforter-St. Cyprian's congregation was 95% former St. Cyprian members. During the conflict the merger created, the Catholic Church began to allow Masses in languages other than Latin following the Second Vatican Council. The Latin chants were quickly replaced with "the hearty rhythms and hand clapping of a gospel choir, making the church more akin to its Baptist and Methodist brethren," allowing the congregation to express their African-American heritage. During this period, the church was administered by the Josephites, a religious community serving African Americans.

Due to decreasing church attendance in the United States, rapidly changing demographics in DC, and an aging congregation, church attendance and membership have been steadily decreasing since the 1960s. The church's gospel choir, started during the 1960s, at the 11am services maintains a pivotal role in the church's community and spirit.

== Gospel choir ==
The choir has become well known around the country, and has recorded a number of albums, including the "Mass of St Cyprian" (1999) composed by the parish's music director, the late Kenneth W. Louis. The parish also released an album in 2012, "We Offer Praise".

== Parish life ==
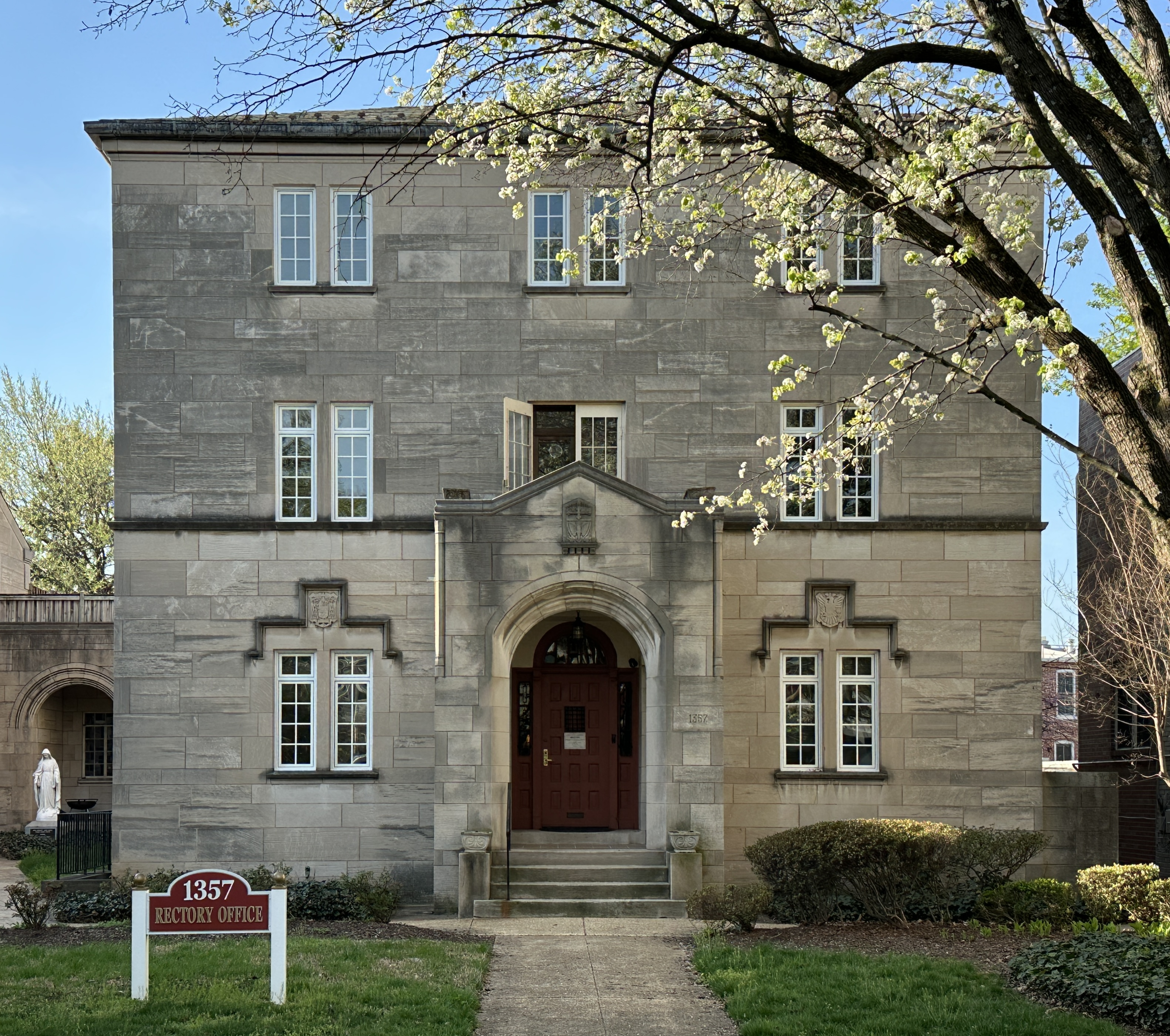
The church rectory adjoins the main building

=== Holy Name Society ===
The Holy Name Society is a group of laymen dedicated to the praise and respect of the most Holy Name of God.

=== Ladies of Charity ===
The Ladies of Charity was organized in May 1932 and provides services to the community "who are in need of food and clothing, especially shoes for the children." They are also related to St. Vincent de Paul.

== School ==
On September 16, 1892, a group of Oblate Sisters of Providence, an order of black nuns, met with Miss Mary Atkins who had promised to donate land to establish a school on the corner of 8th and C Streets. The school doors opened on October 2, 1892, under the patronage of St. Ann.

== Pastors ==
- Fr James Mathews (St. Cyprian: 1893)
- Fr Joseph McGuire (Holy Comforter: 1904)
- Msgr. Charles R. O'Hara (Holy Comforter: 1936–1939)
- Fr John Ricard, SSJ (1975–1979)
- Fr Robert M. "Rocky" Kearns, SSJ (1979–1983)
- Msgr. Charles Pope (2007–present)
