= Architectural educator =

An architectural educator is a person who trains prospective professional architects and architectural technicians. This involves training in the discipline of architectural design or more specifically, the design of constructed environments.

Architectural Education has both public architectural education and professional architectural education stakeholder groups.

Architectural educators may work in the service of the architectural profession or in the wider community. Architectural education in many countries is regulated by validation or accreditation. In the wider community, architectural educators may use their knowledge to raise citizens or members of a community's awareness of their respective environment, and their role in its ownership and custodianship.

Architectural Educators are represented by national and regional associations such as ACSA in the US, the ACA in Australia and New Zealand, and the EAAE in Europe.

== History of architectural education ==
Architecture has a history of being used as an educational tool, traditionally practised by architects such as Frank Lloyd Wright and Le Corbusier, or as an educational heurism, as in the case of the work of Indian architect Anupama Kundoo.

Architecture was "archaically" defined in Western history by Marcus Vitruvius Pollio (Rome c. 40 BC) as a culturally "higher order". In the writing, De architectura (On Architecture, in Ten Books), Vitruvius also formalised written Western architectural education. Other cultures also have aural and tactile non-textual architectural education traditions. Contemporary education about the order and placement of things has been regarded as a hermeneutic (in Schleiermacher's sense): as developing citizens' understanding about the ecological significance of arrangements of people and things in particular human environments.

== List of architectural educators ==
Some architectural educators are:

- Iain Borden
- Beatriz Colomina
- Mazharul Islam
- Eugene Pandala
- Balkrishna Doshi
- Deborah Howard
- Anupama Kundoo
