= Navy Superior Civilian Service Award =

U.S. Navy civilian medal

Navy Superior Civilian Service Medal
- Country: United States
- Presented by: Department of the Navy
- Eligibility: Civilian employees of the Department of the Navy and Marine Corps
- Status: Active
- Ribbon bar of the medal

Precedence
- Next (higher): Navy Distinguished Civilian Service Award
- Next (lower): Navy Meritorious Civilian Service Award

The Navy Superior Civilian Service Award is the highest honorary award the Chief of Naval Operations or the Commandant of the Marine Corps may bestow on a civilian employee in the Department of the Navy and the highest award granted at the major claimant level. This is the second highest honorary award under the Department of the Navy Civilian Awards program.

This award recognizes employee contributions that are exceptionally high in value, but affect a smaller area than the Navy Distinguished Civilian Service Award and are more significant than those for which the award of the Navy Meritorious Civilian Service Award is made. The Superior Civilian Service Award may be awarded for contributions that serve as a model for other commands. The award consists of a certificate, citation, medal, and lapel bar.

The award is presented for:

- Indications of innovative leadership of highly successful programs or projects that had impact beyond the employee’s command.
- Accomplishments/achievements that have had as a minimum, a wide impact in the Department of the Navy.
- Scientific or technical advances, or suggestions of significant value.
- Accomplishments that show unusual management abilities, innovative thinking, and/or outstanding leadership, which benefit the Department of the Navy.
- Responsibility for major cost savings/reductions/avoidance.
- Unusual acts of heroism.
- Exceptional cooperative efforts with other Navy offices, Naval civilian employees, Federal agencies, or the private sector.

== Notable award recipients ==
- Byron Sjoblom, Naval Undersea Warfare Center, Division Newport, 2023
- Theresa B. Lang, Senior Information Security Officer for the Chief of Naval Operations, 2019
- Kurt N. Reese, Principal Deputy Program Manager, MIDS Program Office, 2018
- Timothy P. Trant, Chief of Naval Personnel, 1996, 2002 (2nd Award)
- Dominick Cimino, NAVSEA Naval Architecture Technical Director, Washington Navy Yard, Washington D.C. January 10, 2012
- Judith Harrison, 2014
- Lisa M. Schenck, 2020
- Cynthia L. Catalan-Rodriguez, US Navy JAG Corps, RLSO SE, DET Mayport, Florida June 12, 2015
- Eugene M. Ramras, Director & Deputy Technical Director, Navy Personnel Research and Development Center (NPRDC), 1986
- Joshua Hickey, ONI, 2016
- Susan L. Alderson, Technical Director, Marine Corps Tactical Systems Support Activity (MCTSSA) 2011, 2022 (2nd Award)
- Jeffrey "Scott" Hedrick, Executive Director, Naval Supply Systems Command Fleet Logistics Center Pearl Harbor, 2024
- Samara Firebaugh, 2022
- Lorrie R. Owens, Chief Acquisition Officer, PAE MC, 2026
