= Navy Meritorious Civilian Service Award =

U.S. Navy civilian medal

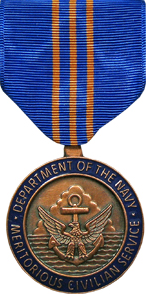
- Navy Meritorious Civilian Service Award
- Country: United States
- Presented by: Department of the Navy
- Eligibility: Civilian employees of the Department of the Navy and the Marine Corps
- Status: Active
- Ribbon bar of the medal

Precedence
- Next (higher): Navy Superior Civilian Service Medal
- Next (lower): Navy Civilian Service Commendation Medal

The Navy Meritorious Civilian Service Award is bestowed on civilian employees in the United States Department of the Navy for meritorious service or contributions resulting in high value or benefits for the Navy or the Marine Corps. It is conferred for a contribution that applies to a local or smaller area of operation or a project of lesser importance than would be warranted for consideration for the Navy Distinguished Civilian Service Award or the Navy Superior Civilian Service Award. It is awarded by the local activity head to U.S. Navy employees for service or contributions resulting in high value or benefit to the Department of Navy. The award consists of a certificate and citation signed by the activity head, medal and lapel emblem. The award is the third highest Navy civilian award, ranking just behind the Navy Superior Civilian Service Award, which is itself behind the Navy Distinguished Civilian Service Award.

== Eligibility ==
Accomplished supervisory or non-supervisory duties in an exemplary manner, setting a record of achievement, and inspiring others to improve the quantity and quality of their work. Exhibited unusual courage or competence in an emergency, while performing assigned duties, resulting in direct benefit to the Government or its personnel. Rendered professional or public relations service of a unique or distinctive character. Demonstrated unusual initiative and skill in devising new and improved equipment, work methods, and procedures; inventions resulting in substantial savings in expenses such as manpower, time, space, and materials, or improved safety or health of the workforce; improving the morale of employees in a unit which resulted in improvement of work performance and esprit de corps. This award may also be given at the time of retirement.

== Award recipients ==
- Danny R. Lanier, Director Marine Rotational Forces- Darwin, Marine Corps Community Services, 2026
- Makayla Martin, Sexual Assault Response Coordinator, Naval Air Station Oceana, 2026
- James "Jim" Jensen, Naval Surface Warfare Center, Dahlgren Division, Dahlgren, VA. 2023
- Dominick Cimino, NAVSEA Naval Architecture Technical Director, Washington Navy Yard, Washington D.C. 1991
- Stephen "Baron" Beck von Peccoz, Commander, Naval Air Force, U.S. Pacific Fleet, San Diego, CA. 2025
- Dustin Morris, NAVSEA Southwest Regional Maintenance Center, San Diego, CA. 2026
- Jeffrey Fagnant, Spawar Systems Center Pacific, San Diego, CA. 2015
- Katie Adkins, NAVSEA Southwest Regional Maintenance Center, San Diego, CA. 2019
- Peter J. Zawada, Naval Air Systems Command, Naval Air Warfare Center, NAS Patuxent River, MD. 2025
- Dane A. Lesch, MCIWEST G-6, MCB Camp Pendleton, CA. 2023
- Brian M. Snow, Naval Surface Warfare Center, Crane. 2023
- Robert A. Hanshew, National Museum of the U.S. Navy, Washington Navy Yard, Washington, D.C. 2023
- Joshua Hickey, ONI 2010
- Victor W. Johnston, U.S. Naval Computer and Telecommunications Station, Far East. 2023
- Dr. Donald H. Steinbrecher, Naval Undersea Warfare Center, Division Newport. 2022
- Walt Sidorovich, Naval Air Warfare Center Aircraft Division. 2022
- Stephen (Rusty) Weathers, Naval Surface Warfare Center Panama City Division. 2022
- John DiMaio, Naval Undersea Warfare Center Division Newport. 2022
- Gary Huntress, Naval Undersea Warfare Center Division Newport. 2022
- Darrin Krivitsky, Naval Surface Warfare Center Indian Head Division. 2022
- John Hurley, Naval Surface Warfare Center Indian Head Division. 2022
- Michael Capil, Navy Region Korea. 2020
- Kathryn Ostapuk, USN, Navy Region Southwest, 2019
- Eileen K. Carnaggio, USMC, Marine Corps Base Hawaii, Kaneohe, HI. 2019
- Toufue Chang, Naval Air Systems Command, Naval Air Warfare Center Weapons Division, Point Mugu, CA. 2019
- Douglas Brent Hegdahl, Instructor, US Navy Survival, Evasion, Resistance and Escape School, NAS North Point, San Diego, CA
- Bernard C. McDonald, U.S. Naval Hospital Guantanamo Bay, Cuba. 2000
- Jeffrey "Scott" Hedrick, Naval Supply Systems Command Fleet Logistics Center Pearl Harbor. (3 awards) 2013, 2018, 2021
- Jennifer Sullivan, Wounded Warrior Regiment, Quantico, VA. 2015
- Cody Carter, U.S.M.C. Recruit Depot Parris Island, SC. 2015
- Pamela S. Long, U.S. Naples, Italy. 1994
- Michael J Perozziello, U.S. Naval Air Systems Command, Washington D.C. 1999
- Rebecca Kelley, Naval Air Systems Command, Patuxent River, MD 2024
- Sameh R Rasooli, U.S. Naval Information Warfare Center, Washington D.C. 2025
- Howard Kaiser, U.S. Naval Surface Warfare Center, Carderock. 2022
- Michael Brininstool, U.S. Space and Naval Warfare Systems Center, San Diego. 1999
- Stacey Curtis, U.S. Space and Naval Warfare Systems Center, San Diego. 2011
- Charles E. Bailey Jr., Naval Facilities Engineering Command, Southern Division. 1999

== See also ==
- Meritorious Civilian Service Award
