= Sam Jensen Page =

Sam Francis Page
- Born: September 9, 1974 (age 51); Salt Lake City
- Occupations: fitness coach, model

Samuel Page (married name Sam Francis Page; born September 19, 1974) is a celebrity fitness coach, actor and bodyguard in Los Angeles, California.

== Early life and education ==
Born on September 19 in a suburb of Salt Lake City, Sam became an entrepreneur at the age of 13, with the opening of Sam's Candy, Inc., which soon grew to three locations. Page won the Governor of Utah's "Young Entrepreneur of the Year" award in 1991. In 1992, he was nominated by Senator Orrin Hatch (R-Utah) and later appointed to the U.S. Merchant Marine Academy at Kings Point, NY, but instead attended Gonzaga University where he earned a bachelor's degree in journalism.

== Early career ==
In 1996, as editor-in-chief of the Gonzaga Bulletin, he received three first-place awards from the Society of Professional Journalists. He worked briefly as a reporter for the Spokesman-Review, the daily newspaper of record in Spokane, Washington.

== HERO Magazine ==
In 1997, he co-founded and published Hero magazine for gay men which ran from 1997 to 2002 and won distinction as "One of the Top 10 Magazines" in the United States. HERO rode the wave of the "mainstreaming" of LGBT culture, publishing the first automotive column in a national gay magazine, the first gay wedding guide, etc. HERO differed in advertising and editorial policy from other leading gay men's magazines and did not accept adult or tobacco advertising. The magazine was also more inclusive of couples and men over forty than other magazines at the time. The September 11, 2001 attack on the World Trade Center impacted venture capitalists negatively impacting HERO, and the publication ceased operations in early 2002.

== Modeling & Fitness ==
Sam has appeared as a model in more than a dozen publications, including HIVPLUS Magazine, Attitude (magazine) (UK), and Playgirl. In 2003, he secured the lead role in a sold-out run of a Ronnie Larsen play at Hyde Park Theatre in Austin, Texas. In 2004, he decided to dedicate his life to health and fitness. He began working off-camera, training top producers of ABC's television show Extreme Makeover: Home Edition in 2004, and co-hosted a fitness program on SIRIUS Satellite Radio with SIRIUS/XM radio pioneer John McMullen until McMullen's departure from the company in December 2006.

In 2014 The Advocate and sister publication, “HIV Plus” placed him second on their list of the “20 Most Amazing HIV+ Men" in the world.

In 2018, Page competed and won first place (employee titleholder) in the Gold's Gym SoCal Challenge, an annual bodybuilding competition.

He currently works as an elite/master trainer at Gold's Gym in Hollywood, and managed the personal training department at Gold's North Hollywood location. He also provides fitness & health education to the Life Group LA, Athletes for Humanity, The Thrive Tribe Foundation and Being Alive.
