= Thayne McCulloh =

American academic

Thayne M. McCulloh

26th President of Gonzaga University
- In office July 15, 2009 – July 14, 2025
- Preceded by: Robert Spitzer
- Succeeded by: Katia Passerini

Personal details
- Born: August 20, 1964 (age 61) Los Angeles, California, U.S.
- Education: Gonzaga University (BA); Wolfson College, Oxford (DPhil)
- Profession: Academic, psychologist, academic administrator

Military service
- Allegiance: United States
- Branch/service: United States Army
- Years of service: 1983-1986 Active Army
- Rank: Sergeant
- Unit: Quartermaster Corps

Thayne Martin McCulloh (born August 20, 1964) is an American social psychologist, consultant, and former higher education administrator, who served as the 26th President of Gonzaga University in Spokane, Washington from July 2009 until his retirement in July 2025. McCulloh was selected as the interim successor of Robert Spitzer, S.J. on July 15, 2009. A year later, on July 16, 2010, McCulloh was appointed president in his own right. He was appointed Gonzaga's first president emeritus on the day his successor, Katia Passerini, became Gonzaga's 27th president, July 15, 2025.

== Early life and education ==
McCulloh was born in Los Angeles, raised in Claremont, California; Bethesda, Maryland; and Seattle, Washington. He attended Bishop Blanchet High School in Seattle, graduated from John Marshall (Alternative) High School, and enlisted in the United States Army as a food service specialist, primarily with the 5th Infantry Division at Fort Polk, Louisiana. Honorably discharged a sergeant, his military decorations included the Army Commendation Medal and the Army Achievement Medal. Following his discharge, he earned his bachelor's degree in psychology from Gonzaga University in 1989. As a student, he was elected Gonzaga's student body president during his senior year.

In 1989, McCulloh was admitted to study for the Master of Science degree in experimental psychology at Oxford University. A member of Wolfson College, McCulloh conducted research under the supervision of British social psychologists Michael Argyle and Nicholas Emler. His academic advisor was experimental psychologist Donald E. Broadbent. McCulloh's area of research involved evaluating the power of the social context in gender stereotyping. Other faculty and colleagues with whom he worked include well-known psychologist, author and television personality Peter Collett, and British Green Party politician Mike Woodin. As a student, he tutored undergraduates, was a member of the Oxford Union and participated in symposia of the British Psychological Society. In 1998, he was granted the degree of Doctor of Philosophy in experimental social psychology from Oxford University, and elected to membership in the American Psychological Association.

== Career ==
McCulloh joined the staff of Gonzaga University in 1990. He initially worked as a student affairs employee in the residence life department. He taught undergraduate psychology part-time for a number of years while serving in a variety of administrative positions, including dean of student academic services, dean of student financial services, associate academic vice president, and vice president for administration and planning. McCulloh also served as the interim academic vice president from 2007 until becoming interim president in 2009. During his career as an administrator, he worked on a number of projects including development of Gonzaga's first office for students with disabilities, the implementation of an integrated computing information system, building new on-campus housing, chairing the decennial regional accreditation self-study, and the creation of a plan for Gonzaga's future development.

=== President of Gonzaga ===
McCulloh was named interim president of the university by Gonzaga's board of trustees on April 17, 2009. His appointment was effective on July 15, 2009. McCulloh was elevated from interim president to president of Gonzaga by the board of trustees on July 16, 2010. His promotion made McCulloh the university's first permanent, non-Jesuit to hold the office in Gonzaga's history.

One of McCulloh's consistent emphases focuses on student success and placing student needs at the center of projects and decision-making. A signature development as president has been instilling the importance of thoughts and prayers whenever any sort of tragedy occurs, no matter the severity.

During his tenure, Gonzaga University has undertaken a number of significant capital projects with the goal of significantly improving the student experience as well as improving and expanding the learning environment of the university. Shortly after assuming office (2011), the university constructed a multi-level parking structure; in the summer of 2013 the university began construction of a 168,000 square foot University Center. This project supported by what was then the largest gift in Gonzaga's history. The John J. Hemmingson University Center opened in 2015 and provides a technologically advanced environment reflective of the core components of a distinctly Jesuit education. A LEED Gold certified facility, it prominently features the Center for Global Engagement, reflective of the institution's commitment to international education and study abroad, as well as numerous services to host and support student learning and functions to support student development. The center also hosts the new, primary residential dining facility for the campus. In 2014, Gonzaga announced a significant bequest, which supported construction of the 52,000 s.f. Myrtle Woldson Center for the Performing Arts. Recognizing the importance of healthcare as a vital growth area as well as a local economic development focus, McCulloh has worked to support significant developments, such as the launch of a new School of Nursing and Human Physiology in response to growing demand, as well as the creation of a Spokane medical education partnership with the University of Washington. A new facility to support the UW-Gonzaga Health Partnership was completed and formally opened in September, 2022

In September 2018, Gonzaga University concluded its most ambitious fundraising campaign to date which, when announced in 2015, had a goal of $250 million. The total raised was $355.4 million, of which $110 million was dedicated to fund scholarships for students.

Gonzaga's part in the Catholic sex abuse scandal once again made headlines during McCulloh's term as president, when an investigative report found that priests with histories of sexual abuse had been quietly sent to live in a retirement facility on the university campus, shielding them from public awareness. McCulloh said he had no knowledge of the campus being used to hide abusive priests, and that he understood why some were incredulous that he could have not known. McCulloh established a commission to investigate the university's role and actions, and, in a public letter, said he was horrified by the abuse by priests, and expressed his feelings of "feelings of sadness, disgust and betrayal" upon learning that they had been housed on campus.

=== Response to the COVID-19 Pandemic ===
When the COVID-19 pandemic forced the immediate closure of all institutions of learning in the United States in March 2020, McCulloh created a task force to guide the short- and long-term response of the university. Gonzaga did not engage in layoffs or furloughs of its personnel, nor did it reduce benefits or salaries. The university-wide planning effort made possible the resumption of in-class instruction for the Fall semester of 2020 at a time when the university was one of few higher education institutions in the state to return to in-person as well as hybrid instruction. Gonzaga also partnered with local health care organizations to provide access to COVID-19 vaccines in early 2021 and assisted in making them more widely available to the Spokane community.

The COVID-19 pandemic briefly interrupted, but did not stop, construction of important new campus improvements, both in Spokane and at the university's site in Florence, Italy. The 82,000 square foot John and Joan Bollier Family Center for Integrated Science and Engineering, which broke ground in September 2019, was completed in Fall 2021.

=== Post-pandemic Period ===
The period following the COVID-19 pandemic saw continued positive momentum for Gonzaga. Completion of a new, 90,000 square foot facility to house Gonzaga's health education partnership with the University of Washington School of Medicine opened in September, 2022. Ground was broken on the first phase of a planned multi-phase housing complex for upper division students; the first of the new residence halls, Mantua Hall, opened in Winter 2025. Among other notable academic achievements, the university was approved to shelter a chapter of Phi Beta Kappa, the nation's oldest and most prestigious honor society, in August 2024; the inaugural class of honorees were inducted in April 2025.

=== President Emeritus ===
On April 22, 2024 McCulloh announced his intent to retire from the presidency in July 2025. He served for sixteen years, the second-longest tenure of any Gonzaga president. Upon his retirement, Gonzaga's Board of Trustees announced that McCulloh had been named president emeritus, the first in Gonzaga's history.

== Public service and awards ==
McCulloh has served in leadership on a number of non-profit boards and has been recognized numerous times for his contributions to the Spokane community and to higher education. He was a former commissioner and chair of the Northwest Commission of Colleges and Universities (NWCCU), one of the six institutional accrediting bodies in the United States. He served as chair of the West Coast Conference athletic league. He served as vice-chair of the board for the Association of Jesuit Colleges and Universities (AJCU). His work with the AJCU included efforts in support of the Jesuit Worldwide Learning (JWL) project of which he was a Global Advisory Board member; JWL is headquartered in Geneva, Switzerland. He concluded his second term as board member for the National Association of Independent Colleges and Universities in 2025 and chaired the board of directors of the Independent Colleges of Washington. In 2009 the Archdiocese of Seattle's Fulcrum Foundation recognized McCulloh as a "Champion of Catholic Education," and in 2013 he received the President's Award from Region V of the National Association of Student Personnel Administrators. He currently serves as a Trustee of the Committee for Economic Development, a nonprofit, nonpartisan, business-led policy center based in Washington, D.C. McCulloh was recognized as one of 24 People of Influence in 2024 by the Spokane Journal of Business.

== Personal life ==
McCulloh is married to Julie McCulloh. The couple have three daughters.
