= Magis Institute =

Magis Institute is a non-profit educational organization dedicated to public education concerning the complementary relationship among the varied disciplines of physics, philosophy, reason, and faith. It was founded by Jesuit priest and former Gonzaga University president Robert J. Spitzer, SJ. The institute's primary outreaches are the Magis Center, The Purposeful Universe, and The Magis Institute for Teachers and Catechists.

== History ==
Fr. Robert Spitzer, SJ, a Jesuit priest, philosopher, educator, author, speaker, and retired President of Gonzaga University in Spokane, Washington, joined with Tim Busch to create the Magis Institute. Spitzer is currently the President of the institute.

== The Magis Center for Reason and Faith ==
Magis Institute originally was created simply to be a center for Catholic spirituality. In 2008, Father Spitzer and his associates at Magis considered how they might offer a reasoned, scientific alternative viewpoint to those publicly expressed by "new atheism" writers such as Christopher Hitchens and Richard Dawkins. As a result of these conversations, Father Spitzer began the Magis Center for Reason and Faith to provide a framework for the creation and distribution of materials expressing this alternative viewpoint.

On 3 September 2010, the Catholic News Agency featured Spitzer in a printed response to the announcement of Stephen Hawking's new book touching on the subject of the origins of the universe.

On 10 September 2010, the institute was mentioned on the CNN program Larry King Live. Father Spitzer appeared as a panelist on the program which featured Dr. Stephen Hawking, Hawking's literary collaborator, Leonard Mlodinow, and author Deepak Chopra in a one-hour prime-time discussion on the need for a transcendent creator of the universe.

== Methods ==
The institute, through Magis Center for Reason and Faith, has utilized different methods to leverage media to publicize a view of the compatibility of faith and reason:

=== Books ===
Father Spitzer published New Proofs for the Existence of God Other books authored by members of the institute are intended to be affordable and tailored to the average reader within the planned demographic. The institute also helps to promote the books of other writers who share a similar viewpoint, e.g. William Lane Craig, working with a physicist named Simpson, published the Blackwell Commentary on Natural Theology.

=== Documentary films ===
Former NBC News and Today Show producer Martha Cotton works with the institute to make these complex issues more intelligible and to prompt discussions among high school students. The first documentary, "Cosmic Origins", features Nobel Laureate Arno Penzias, who discovered background radiation from the Big Bang. The video also features John Polkinghorne, who is an Anglican priest and a winner of the Templeton Prize.

=== Social media ===
The institute has a popular Facebook page, and frequently releases videos on YouTube. This content highlights the long history of scientific research done by members of the clergy over the centuries, with a special focus on those who are currently active in their respective fields.

=== High school curriculum ===
The institute's website offers a curriculum for high school students that is designed for use in parochial schools and church youth groups.

=== Adult education and college curriculum ===
The institute arranged for a college course in conjunction with Benedictine College in Atchison, Kansas titled "Physics and Metaphysics in Dialogue".
