= List of business schools in Washington, D.C. =

This is a list of business schools in Washington, D.C.

School	Founded	Parent University	AACSB Accreditation
Kogod School of Business	1955	American University	Yes
School of Business	1928	George Washington University	Yes
McDonough School of Business	1957	Georgetown University	Yes
The Busch School of Business	2013	Catholic University of America	
School of Business		Howard University	
School of Business and Public Administration	1977	University of the District of Columbia	No (ACBSP accredited)
