= Tim Busch =

American philanthropist

Timothy R. Busch is an American Catholic attorney, businessman, and philanthropist from Orange County, California.

== Early life ==
Busch grew up in Clinton, Michigan as the second of six children in a devoutly Catholic family. His father, Joe, founded and operated a chain of upscale supermarkets, Busch's Fresh Food Market. He received his bachelor's degree from Western Michigan University and his J.D. degree from Wayne State University Law School. In 1982, Busch moved to southern California. He married his wife, Steph, in 1985. he has a son, Garrett, and a daughter, Mackenzie. Busch lives in Nellie Gail Ranch, Laguna Hills, and has a second home at the Reserve Country Club in Indian Wells, California. He is a devout Catholic and active in Legatus and a number of other Catholic organizations and charities.

== Career ==
Busch is the founder of the Busch Firm, a financial services company that specializes in high net-worth estate planning. The Busch Firm also handles real estate and business transactions. Busch also founded the Pacific Hospitality Group which owns and manages eight hotels in California. As of 2019, Busch is the CEO. Busch and his brothers own the supermarket chain founded by their father.

== Philanthropy ==
In 2011, Busch joined the Jesuit Father Robert Spitzer to create the Magis Institute, an organization dedicated to exploring the intersection of faith and reason. In 2011, he founded the Napa Institute with Spitzer in an effort to train Catholic leaders to defend the faith in an increasingly secular society. The Napa Institute is known for its annual conferences at a California wine spa that aims to blend "conservative theology and libertarian economics, with an emphasis on apologetics, sexual ethics and countercultural anti-secularization", and has been linked to ultraconservative critics of Pope Francis.

A conservative, Busch and his wife founded St. Anne's School in Laguna Niguel in 1992. They also started JSerra Catholic High School in San Juan Capistrano. In 2016, Busch's charitable foundation, the Busch Family Foundation, gave $15 million to The Catholic University of America. Busch helped bring in an additional $32 million in gifts that were used in part to renovate Maloney Hall, and to turn it into a home for the renamed Tim and Steph Busch School of Business. The building has been described as "Harvard on the outside, Google on the inside", as well as "one of the premier academic buildings in Washington, D.C. if not the country". In 2016, Busch finished serving on the board of the university for 12 years. He also served on the board of visitors of the business school.
