= Joseph E. Nyre =

American academic administrator

21st President of Seton Hall University
- In office 2019–2023
- Succeeded by: Katia Passerini (interim)

President of Iona College
- In office 2011–2019
- Succeeded by: Seamus Carey

Personal details
- Born: Beloit, Wisconsin
- Education: University of Missouri; University of Kansas; Harvard Medical School
- Occupation: Academic Administrator, Psychologist

Joseph E. Nyre, Ph.D. is an American psychologist and academic administrator, who served as president of Iona University from 2011 to 2019 and of Seton Hall University from 2019 to 2023..

== Early life and education ==
Born in 1968 and raised in Beloit, Wisconsin, Nyre was the first in his family to attend college. He earned an undergraduate degree in psychology in 1991 from the University of Wisconsin, La Crosse, receiving the institution's highest alumni honor in 2014, the Maurice O’Graff Award. Nyre went on to attain three graduate degrees and complete pre- and post-doctoral studies at the University of Missouri, the University of Kansas, and Harvard Medical School. Before transitioning to leadership roles, he worked as a clinical psychologist, school psychologist, and academic at institutions including Baylor University, the University of Illinois at Chicago, and Harvard Medical School.

== Career ==
Nyre's early research and clinical work focused on childhood loneliness, depression, disruptive behavior disorders, and autism spectrum disorders. As president of The Hope Institute for Children and Families (2003–2011), he transformed the organization from near bankruptcy to serve more than 29,000 children and families each year.

=== President of Iona University (2011–2019) ===
As Iona's eighth and first lay president, Dr. Nyre focused the University on initiatives that led to campus expansion, the establishment of new academic programs and institutes, and a fundraising effort the “Iona Forever Campaign.” This included a $20 million gift which was the largest in the college's history and the campaign resulted in the University endowment tripling in size. Nyre and his wife, Kelli, contributed $100,000 to create the Nyre Family Endowed Scholarship Fund to support student scholarships and faculty awards.

Nyre also uncovered a decade-long pattern of data manipulation by a former provost. Institutional ranking metrics such as SAT scores, graduation rates, and alumni giving statistics had been falsified. In partnership with the Board of Directors, Nyre initiated an investigation, self-reported findings to authorities and ranking publications, and established the Integrity in Reporting Committee to prevent future misconduct.

=== President of Seton Hall University (2019–2023) ===
In 2019, Dr. Nyre became the 21st president of Seton Hall University. Nyre oversaw transformative changes, including the development and implementation of a University-wide strategic plan, a 15-year campus master plan, and an associated fundraising campaign resulting in the largest and most qualified freshman classes in University history. His team significantly increased annual fundraising by over 300%, setting new records and achieving the highest level of giving in any single year in Seton Hall's history. These efforts were part of a comprehensive fundraising campaign, the first of its kind in nearly 15 years. Nyre's team also received recognition for leadership during the COVID-19 pandemic. In May 2020, Seton Hall was one of the first universities on the eastern seaboard to announce university reopening plans.

As a first-generation college graduate, Nyre has championed programs that advance college affordability and provide support and opportunities for first-generation students. At Seton Hall, he prioritized Educational Opportunity Programs, launched the "Affordability Agenda", and other student success initiatives. The American Enterprise Institute recognized his leadership in this area by ranking him 56th nationally for the first quarter century among university presidents.

Nyre and his wife contributed $500,000 to Seton Hall University, aimed at underwriting scholarships and supporting faculty research and instructional activities.

Nyre's tenure at Seton Hall was marked by addressing systemic corruption, including sexual harassment and abuse in the University seminaries, a 10-year embezzlement scheme within Seton Hall Law School, and “pay-to-play” admissions and financial aid practices. His efforts to uphold transparency and accountability often faced resistance, culminating in his resignation in 2023 due to ethical concerns involving the Board of Regents role in the corruption, coverup and retaliation against whistleblowers. This departure is the subject to ongoing litigation.

== Board Service and National Appointments ==
Dr. Nyre has held numerous board and advisory roles across higher education, health care, and international academic institutions. His appointments include:

- Scientific Advisory Board, LISA (Learning, Integration, Support & Awareness), University of Paris
- International University of Catalonia, Advisory Board Member
- Association of Catholic Colleges and Universities, Board Member
- Association of Independent Colleges and Universities in New Jersey, Board Member
- BIG EAST Athletic Conference, Board of Directors
- Hackensack Meridian Health System, Board of Trustees
- Hackensack Meridian School of Medicine, Board of Governors
- Independent College Fund of New Jersey, Trustee
- New Jersey Presidents’ Council, Member
- The Ursuline School, Board Member
- Westchester County Association, Board Member
- eGrain International, Board Member
- Seton Hall University, Board of Trustees and Board of Regents

These roles reflect Nyre’s engagement in academic leadership, health care governance, Catholic education policy, and international scholarship.
