= Hero (magazine) =

American LGBT magazine

HERO
- Categories: LGBT news periodical
- Frequency: Bimonthly
- Founded: 1997
- Final issue: January 2002
- Country: United States
- Based in: Los Angeles
- Language: English

HERO Magazine was an American glossy bimonthly LGBT magazine co-founded in 1997 by Sam Jensen Page and Paul Horne. The magazine stopped publication in January 2002. It was based in Los Angeles.

== Overview ==
The magazine rode the wave of the "mainstreaming" of LGBT culture, and was the first LGBT magazine to be classified as "highly recommended" by Library Journal. It was the first magazine to publish an automotive column in a national LGBT magazine. HERO turned away from the "sex sells" attitude of many other LGBT publications, and did not accept adult or tobacco advertising. The magazine was also more inclusive of men over 40 than other LGBT magazines at the time.

After fast growth in its first 3 years, the magazine's financial backing was frozen after September 11, 2001, and the publication ceased operations in January 2002. However, parent company HERO Media continues to develop other online and print publications, including SpaTravelGuy.com.
