= Katia Passerini =

Italian academic administrator

27th President of Gonzaga University
- Incumbent
- Assumed office July 15, 2025
- Preceded by: Thayne McCulloh

President of Seton Hall University
- Interim
- In office July 24, 2023 – June 30, 2024
- Preceded by: Joseph E. Nyre
- Succeeded by: Monsignor Joseph R. Reilly

Personal details
- Education: George Washington University (MBA, PhD); Libera Università Internazionale degli Studi Sociali Guido Carli; University of Rome Tor Vergata

Katia Passerini is an Italian academic administrator who has served as provost at Seton Hall University since 2020. She served as the interim president of Seton Hall University from 2023 to 2024. She was announced as the 27th president-elect of Gonzaga University on January 15, 2025 to succeed Dr. Thayne McCulloh in July 2025.

== Life ==
Passerini earned a B.A. in political science from Libera Università Internazionale degli Studi Sociali Guido Carli in 1993. She completed a M.A. (1997) in economics from the University of Rome Tor Vergata. She earned a M.B.A. (1996) and Ph.D. (2000) from the George Washington University. Her dissertation was titled, A Comparative Analysis of Performance and Behavioral Outcomes in Different Modes of Technology-Based Learning. Mary J. Granger was her doctoral advisor.

From 2003 to 2013, Passerini was a professor and the Hurlburt chair of management information systems at the Martin Tuchman School of Management of the New Jersey Institute of Technology. She held a joint appointment in the department of information systems at the Ying Wu College of Computing Sciences. In 2016, she joined St. John's University as its Lesley H. and William L. Collins Distinguished Chair and Dean of the Collins College of Professional Studies. Passerini also was a professor in the division of computer science, mathematics, and science. She was dean of the Albert Dorman Honors College from 2013 to 2016.

Passerini joined Seton Hall University on June 5, 2020, as its provost and executive vice president. In 2022, she was elected to the administrative board of the International Federation of Catholic Universities. On July 24, 2023, Passerini became the interim president of Seton Hall, succeeding Joseph E. Nyre. She was succeeded by Monsignor Joseph R. Reilly on July 1, 2024.

== Selected works ==
- Passerini, Katia; Tarabishy, Ayman El; Patten, Karen (2012). Information Technology for Small Business: Managing the Digital Enterprise. Springer Science & Business Media. ISBN 978-1-4614-3040-7.
