= Seamus Carey =

American philosopher and academic

9th President of Iona University
- Incumbent
- Assumed office July 1, 2019
- Preceded by: Joseph E. Nyre, PhD

Personal details
- Spouse: Noreen Carey
- Education: Vassar College; Fordham University
- Profession: Professor

Seamus Carey, Ph.D., an American philosopher and academic, is the 9th President of Iona University in New Rochelle, New York. He previously served as the 26th President of Transylvania University, the first university in the state of Kentucky, from 2014 to 2019. While at Transylvania he was inducted into Omicron Delta Kappa in 2015.

He earned his A.B. from Vassar College in 1987. He later earned an M.A. and a Ph.D. in Philosophy from Fordham University in 1996. Carey attended Harvard's Management Development Program as well as the Executive Leadership Academy, a yearlong program cosponsored by the Council of Independent Colleges, the American Association of State Colleges and Universities, and the American Academic Leadership Institute.

As the Dean of Arts & Sciences at Sacred Heart University, he supervised 121 full-time faculty, 18 department chairs and eight graduate program directors. As part of his development efforts, Carey oversaw the expansion of Sacred Heart's campus in Dingle, Ireland.

Since 2019, as president of Iona, he has overseen a move from college to university. Carey has also overseen the launch of Iona's Nursing program as well two new undergraduate programs in entrepreneurship, the BA in Entrepreneurial Leadership and the BBA in Entrepreneurship. He has officiated the grand reopening of the newly renovated LaPenta School of Business as well as the opening of the Hynes Institute for Entrepreneurship and Innovation. Additionally, Carey played a key role in the hiring of Hall of Fame men's basketball coach Rick Pitino, a two-time NCAA tournament champion.
