= Anthony T. Kane =

American lawyer

The Honorable Anthony T. Kane

Associate Justice of the Appellate Division of the New York Supreme Court, Third Department
- In office 31 July 2002 – 31 December 2009

Sullivan County Supreme Court Justice
- In office January 1996 – 30 July 2002

Personal details
- Born: New York City, New York
- Citizenship: American
- Spouse: Nancy Kane
- Education: Iona College, Cornell Law School
- Occupation: Lawyer

Anthony T. Kane is a former associate justice of the New York Supreme Court. He served in the Appellate Division, Third Department, from 2002 until his retirement in 2009.

== Early life and education ==
Kane was born in New York City to an Irish-descended father, who was uneducated but owned his own company, and a mother who migrated to the United States from Budapest, Hungary, at the age of 13. His mother placed a high value on education in their family, and Kane's older brother was the first in their family to attend college. Kane graduated from Iona College in New Rochelle, in 1966 with a bachelor's degree in economics and, after deciding to pursue a legal rather than business career, graduated with a Juris Doctor from Cornell Law School in 1969.

== Career ==
Following his law school graduation, Kane learned of a job opening as a legal services attorney in Sullivan County and moved to Liberty, New York. He worked in the private sector until 1984, when he was elected the third Sullivan County Family Court judge, taking the bench in 1985. He stayed in that capacity until 1996, when he was appointed to the position of the Supreme Court Justice of Sullivan County. In 2002, he was promoted to the title of associate justice of the Third Department of the Appellate Division of the Supreme Court.
