= Busch School of Business =

Coordinates: 38.9329387°N 76.9977828°W

The Busch School of Business
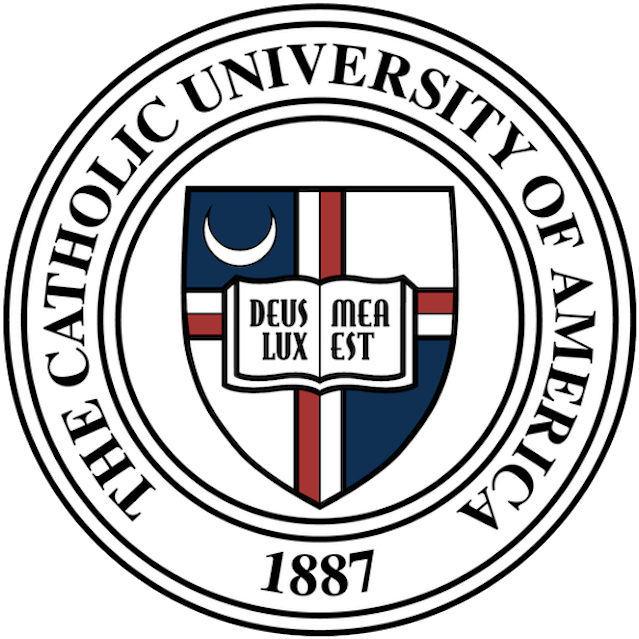
- Established: 2013; 13 years ago
- Parent institution: Catholic University of America
- Affiliations: Catholic
- Dean: Andrew Abela
- Location: Washington, D.C., U.S.
- Campus: Urban
- Website: business.catholic.edu/

The Tim and Steph Busch School of Business is the business school of the Catholic University of America, located in Washington, D.C. (USA), and one of the twelve schools of the university.

== History ==
The Catholic University of America announced Jan. 8, 2013 the creation of a School of Business and Economics. Previously housed in the School of Arts and Sciences as the Department of Business and Economics, the University's Board of Trustees voted in December 2012 to confirm the creation of the school commencing Jan. 1, 2013 after a three-year process of discernment, evaluation, and planning.

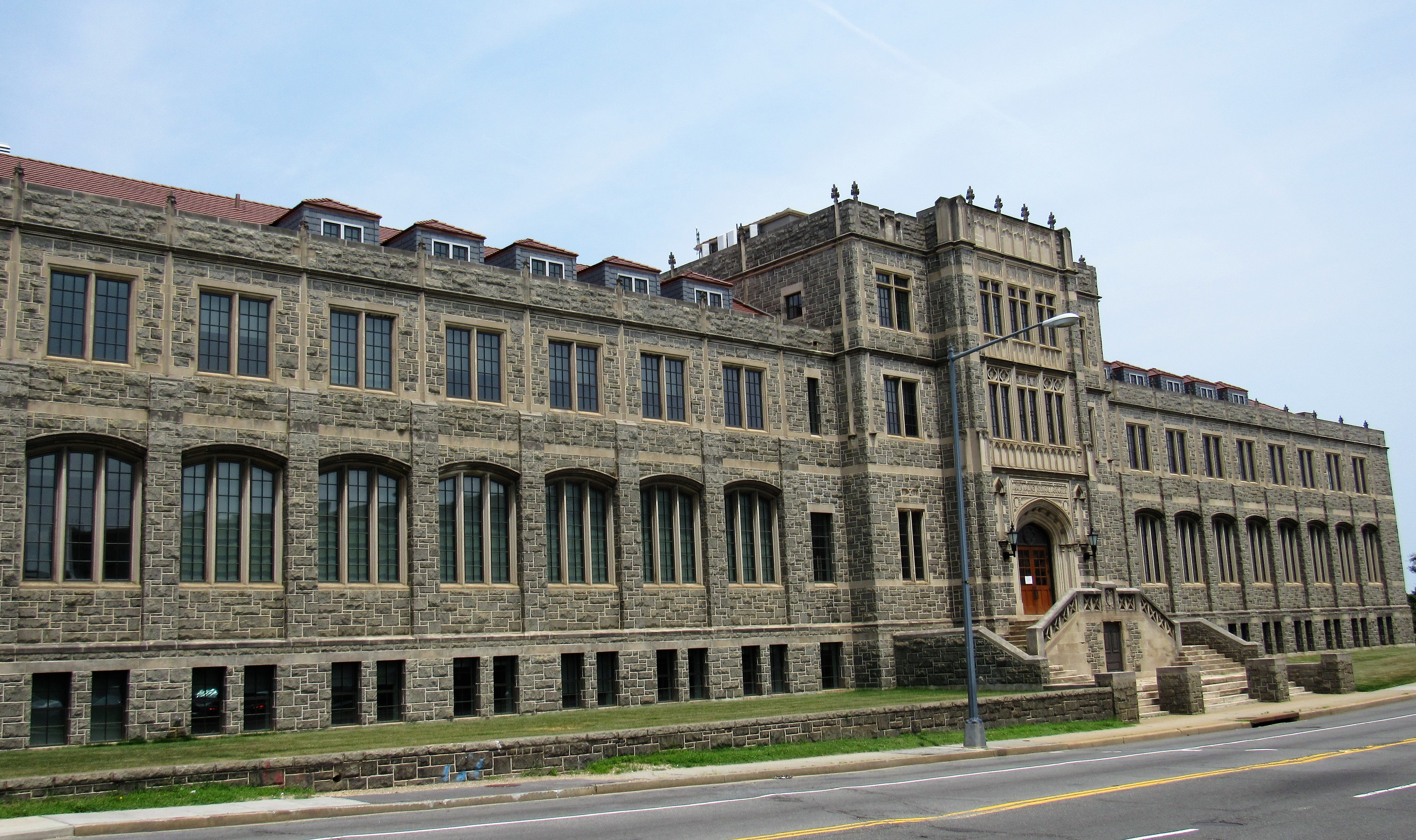
Maloney Hall

In 2016, the School was renamed the Tim and Steph Busch School of Business and Economics after a $15 million donation from the Busch Family Foundation. Tim Busch, a businessman from Irvine, California, and a university trustee, is founder and chief executive of Pacific Hospitality Group and The Busch Firm.

In May 2017, National Catholic Register reported that the school began to offer a Master of Science in Ecclesial Administration and Management "to give current or future pastors the tools they need to wisely shepherd their parishes’ material goods and personnel, so they can effectively carry out their mission to proclaim the Gospel."

On February 6, 2018, The Tower reported that, "The Economics major, previously offered by the Busch School of Business and Economics, will move under the School of Arts and Sciences in the fall of 2018."

On May 6, 2019, it was announced that Andrew Abela would be returning as Dean of The Busch School beginning on July 1, 2019.
