= The Gonzaga Bulletin =

- Type: Weekly student newspaper
- School: Gonzaga University
- Founded: 1887
- Website: gonzagabulletin.com

The Gonzaga Bulletin is a student-run weekly newspaper published at Gonzaga University. The paper has an estimated weekly circulation of 3,000. Generally the newspaper employs around 14 students as page editors for one semester. Writers are typically members of the staff or students from various journalism courses at the university. The editor-in-chief changes with each new semester, meaning the tone of the newspaper and its quality may also change. The newspaper changed its production schedule in fall 2010, and is now edited and laid out on Tuesday nights and distributed on Thursday mornings.

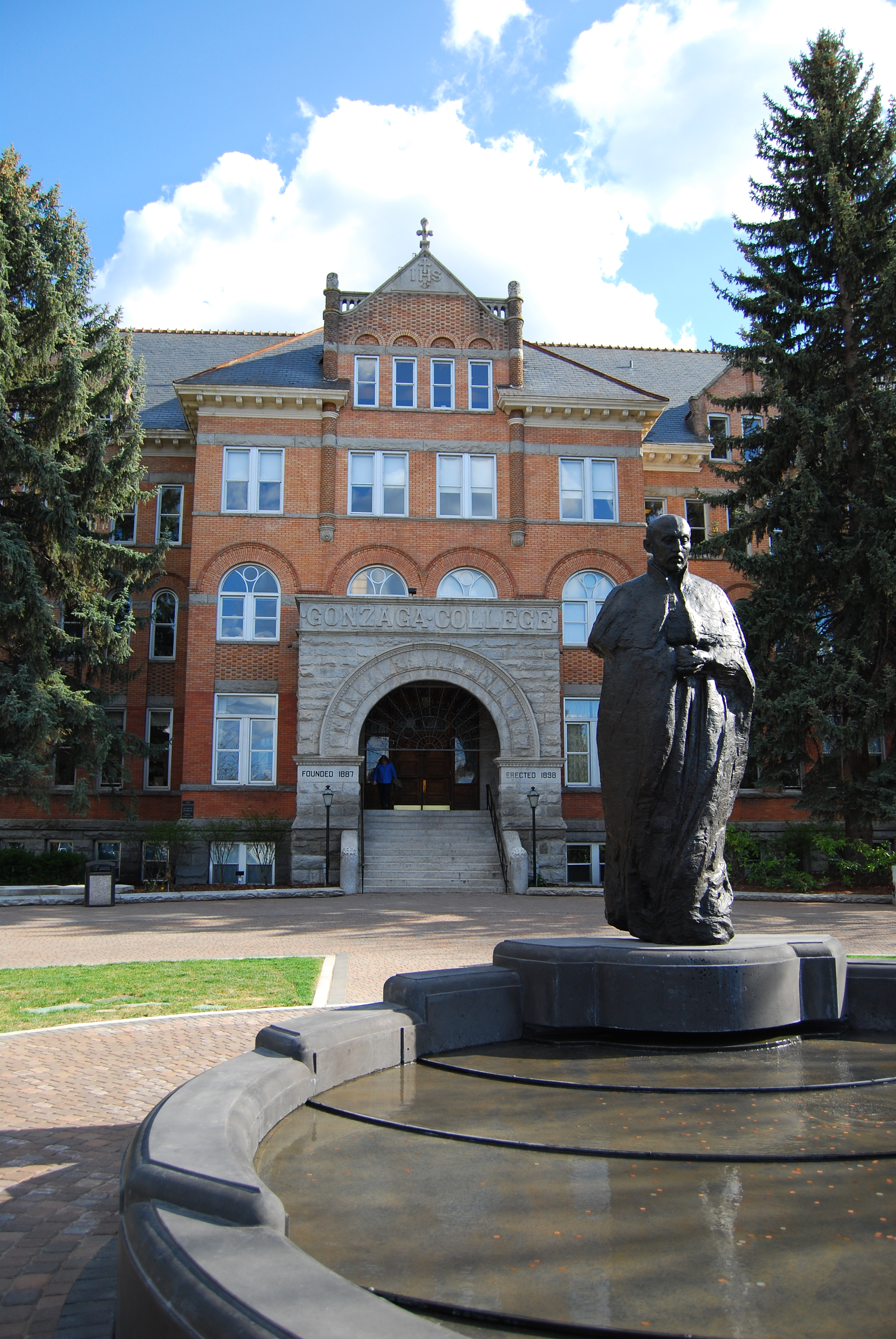
The main entrance of Gonzaga University in Spokane, WA, looking toward the administration building.

== Content ==
The Gonzaga Bulletin ordinarily publishes a 12–14 page edition (depending on advertising space). The News and Sports sections are largest, but the paper also has healthy A&E and Opinion sections.

A newly added Online Exclusives section that can only be accessed at the newspaper's Web site, www.gonzagabulletin.com, features game recaps from basketball home games and various other breaking news.
