= Gonzaga University =

Jesuit university in Spokane, Washington, US

- Former names: Gonzaga College (1887–1912)
- Motto: Ad majorem Dei gloriam (Latin)
- Motto in English: "For the Greater Glory of God"
- Type: Private liberal arts university
- Established: September 17, 1887; 139 years ago
- Founder: Joseph Cataldo
- Accreditation: NWCCU
- Religious affiliation: Catholic (Jesuit)
- Academic affiliations: ACCU; AJCU; NAICU
- Endowment: $498.8 million (2025)
- President: Katia Passerini
- Faculty: 445 full-time, 296 part-time
- Students: 7,470 (fall 2024)
- Undergraduates: 5,293 (fall 2024)
- Postgraduates: 2,177 (fall 2024)
- Location: Spokane, Washington, United States; 47.6675°N 117.4025°W
- Campus: 152 acres (61.5 ha); Midsize city
- Newspaper: The Gonzaga Bulletin
- Colors: Blue and white
- Nicknames: Bulldogs; 'Zags
- Sporting affiliations: NCAA Division I – Pac-12
- Mascot: Spike the Bulldog
- Website: www.gonzaga.edu

Gonzaga University (/ɡənˈzæɡə/ ghən-ZAG-ə; GU) is a private Jesuit university in Spokane, Washington, United States. It is accredited by the Northwest Commission on Colleges and Universities. Founded in 1887 by Joseph Cataldo, a Sicilian-born priest and Jesuit missionary, the university is named after the young Jesuit saint Aloysius Gonzaga. The campus houses 105 buildings on 152 acres (62 ha) of grassland alongside the Spokane River, in a residential setting a half-mile (800 m) from downtown Spokane.

The university grants bachelor's degrees, master's degrees, and doctoral degrees through its college and six schools: the College of Arts and Sciences, School of Business Administration, School of Education, School of Engineering and Applied Science, School of Law, School of Nursing and Human Physiology, and the School of Leadership Studies.

== History ==
=== Founding ===
Gonzaga University was founded in 1887 by Sicilian-American Joseph Cataldo (1837–1928), who had come in 1865 as a Jesuit missionary to the Native Americans of the Pacific Northwest. In 1880, Cataldo built a schoolhouse about 10 to 12 mi (16 to 19 km) northeast of Spokane on the Peone Prairie, to serve children of the Upper Spokane Indians. Cataldo was concerned about the influence and expansion of Protestant schools on the region's native people, and by 1881 was discussing building a Jesuit college with other Jesuit leaders.

The Jesuits chose a location at Spokane Falls (later Spokane) due to its centrality in the Washington, Idaho and Montana region. The Jesuits purchased 320 acres of prime real estate in the city's central business district north of the Spokane River for $936. The Northern Pacific Railway was holding the land in reserve, but Cataldo was able to convince railroad executive John W. Sprague to allow the sale to build the school.

The City of Spokane offered to help pay to build the new college, on the condition that it be a whites only school, in spite of Cataldo's original purpose to educate the local native population. Cataldo's letters seeking the support of Church leadership in Rome warned that Methodists and other Protestants were building schools and that the city funding could go to them if the school was not built soon enough.

=== Inaugural class ===
Construction was delayed until 1886, and the school opened in 1887 with Father James Rebmann serving as the first Father Superior and seven boys enrolled. They were taught by 17 faculty, made up of Jesuit priests and Jesuits in training, scholastics. By the end of the year, more students enrolled, and two were expelled, ending the year with a student body of 18 boys, all white. Father Joseph Joset, a Jesuit missionary, attempted to enroll two native American boys but was rebuffed due to the whites-only policy. Father Rebmann told Joset that the school was only open to "Americans", which he did not consider Indians to be. Non-Catholic boys were also rejected, at least in the college's first years.

Expelled students might have run afoul of rules against offenses like theft, disobedience, impurity, or bans on alcohol and tobacco. The boys were supervised always and not allowed off-campus without a chaperone. They woke at 5:30 AM, and worked until lights out at 8:30 PM. Students attended Mass six days a week, twice on Sundays, and faced often daunting advancement exams. The school was divided into a Preparatory section for elementary school-age boys, an Academic section with Third, Second, and First divisions, and an upper-division like a liberal arts college, for Poetry, Rhetoric and Philosophy. In the second year, enrollment began with 35 boys, 27 of whom were still attending at year's end. By 1890, three of the original 17 faculty members remained. The original Father Superior was followed by Father Charles Mackin, who was replaced in 1891 by Father John Baptist Rene. He served until 1893 and was replaced by Father Leopold Van Gorp.

Students were not allowed to advance to higher classes except upon passage of rigorous examinations that were overseen by the Prefect of Studies. Students might become sick from anxiety while preparing and some withdrew rather than face the exams.

Gonzaga conferred its first Bachelor of Arts degrees to two students. A four-story building was planned in 1897, which opened in 1899 as the New Gonzaga. In 1892, with an enrollment of 50 boys, football, called "college-down", was first played at Gonzaga on Thanksgiving Day. The same year, Gonzaga added a new dormitory, and a wood-framed St. Aloysius Church, and the campus got electric power service for the first time.

=== Cardinal Bea House scandal ===
In 2018, the Center for Investigative Reporting published evidence that the Cardinal Bea House, owned by the Jesuit order and located next to Gonzaga's campus, was used by the Catholic Church as a retirement home for priests with histories of sexual predation and abuse from across the Pacific Northwest and Alaska, from the 1970s through 2016. Sexually abusive priests were quietly kept there, out of contact with vulnerable populations yet shielded from any liability for the abuse they had committed. The last abusive priest moved out of the Cardinal Bea House in 2016.

The Spokane Spokesman-Review newspaper questioned Gonzaga President Thayne McCulloh's statements that he did not know, before or during his time as president, about the abusive priests kept at the Cardinal Bea House.

=== Controversy over University response to campus racism ===
In 2026, Gonzaga University faced public criticism from its Black Student Union and the Spokane NAACP over what was perceived to be an insufficient administrative response to racist incidents on campus, including the targeting of Black students with racist harassment and slurs following a fundraiser event.

=== Presidents ===
- James Rebmann 1886–1890
- Charles Mackin 1890–1891
- John B. Rene 1891–1893
- Leopold Van Gorp 1893–1894
- Lawrence Palladino 1894–1896
- James Rebmann 1896–1899
- George de la Motte 1899–1901
- Joseph Raphael John Crimont 1901–1904
- Francis Dillon 1904–1905
- Herman Goller 1905–1909
- Louis Taelman 1909–1913
- James Brogan 1913–1920
- John McHugh 1920–1921
- Walter Fitzgerald 1921–1927
- Daniel Reidy 1927–1930
- John Keep 1930–1934
- Leo Robinson 1934–1942
- Francis Altman 1942–1945
- Francis Corkery 1945–1957
- Edmund Morton 1957–1961
- John P. Leary 1961–1969
- Richard E. Twohy 1969–1974
- Bernard J. Coughlin 1974–1996
- Edward Glynn 1996–1997
- Robert J. Spitzer 1998–2009
- Thayne McCulloh 2010–2025
- Katia Passerini 2025–present

== Campus ==
Gonzaga's main campus has 105 buildings on 152 acres in the Logan Neighborhood. The university has two large libraries. Foley Center Library is Gonzaga's main graduate and undergraduate library, opened in 1992. Chastek Law Library primarily serves the Gonzaga University School of Law, erected in 2000. The Rosauer School of Education building was completed in 1994.

Gonzaga hosts many unique pieces of artwork, largely devoted to historical religious figures and prominent Catholics. Among the most notable are statues of St. Ignatius, St. Joseph, St. Aloysius, and alumnus Bing Crosby by Deborah Copenhaver Fellows. The Jundt Art Center and Museum established in 1995 also has a variety of artwork from differing periods. The spires of St. Aloysius Church are a landmark of the Spokane area.

Due to an expanding student body, Gonzaga completed construction of a $60 million building that serves as the new Circulus Omnium Gonzagaorum (COG) "center of campus," the John J. Hemmingson Center which replaced the former COG that students used for over 60 years. The three-story building with almost 4 acres (1.6 ha; 167,000 sq ft) of floor space has an all-glass exterior. It was completed in time for the Fall 2015 semester. It also earned a Gold LEED certification.

In 2014, the university made plans to build a performing arts center named after benefactor Myrtle Woldson that would have a 750-seat theater. The building opened to the public in 2019 and holds both a theater and recital hall.

In addition to the campus in Spokane, Gonzaga's virtual campus has degree programs.

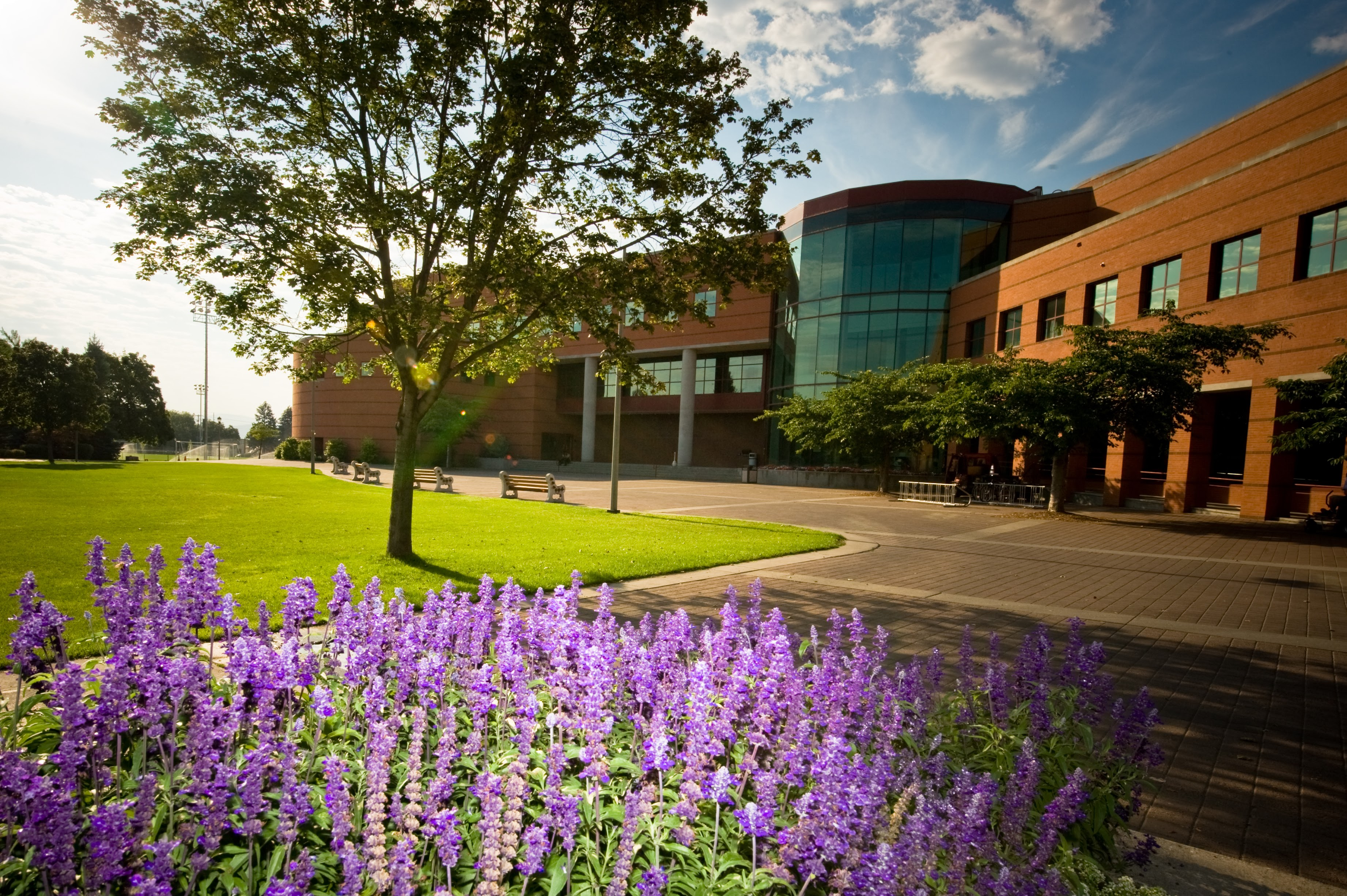
Foley Center Library

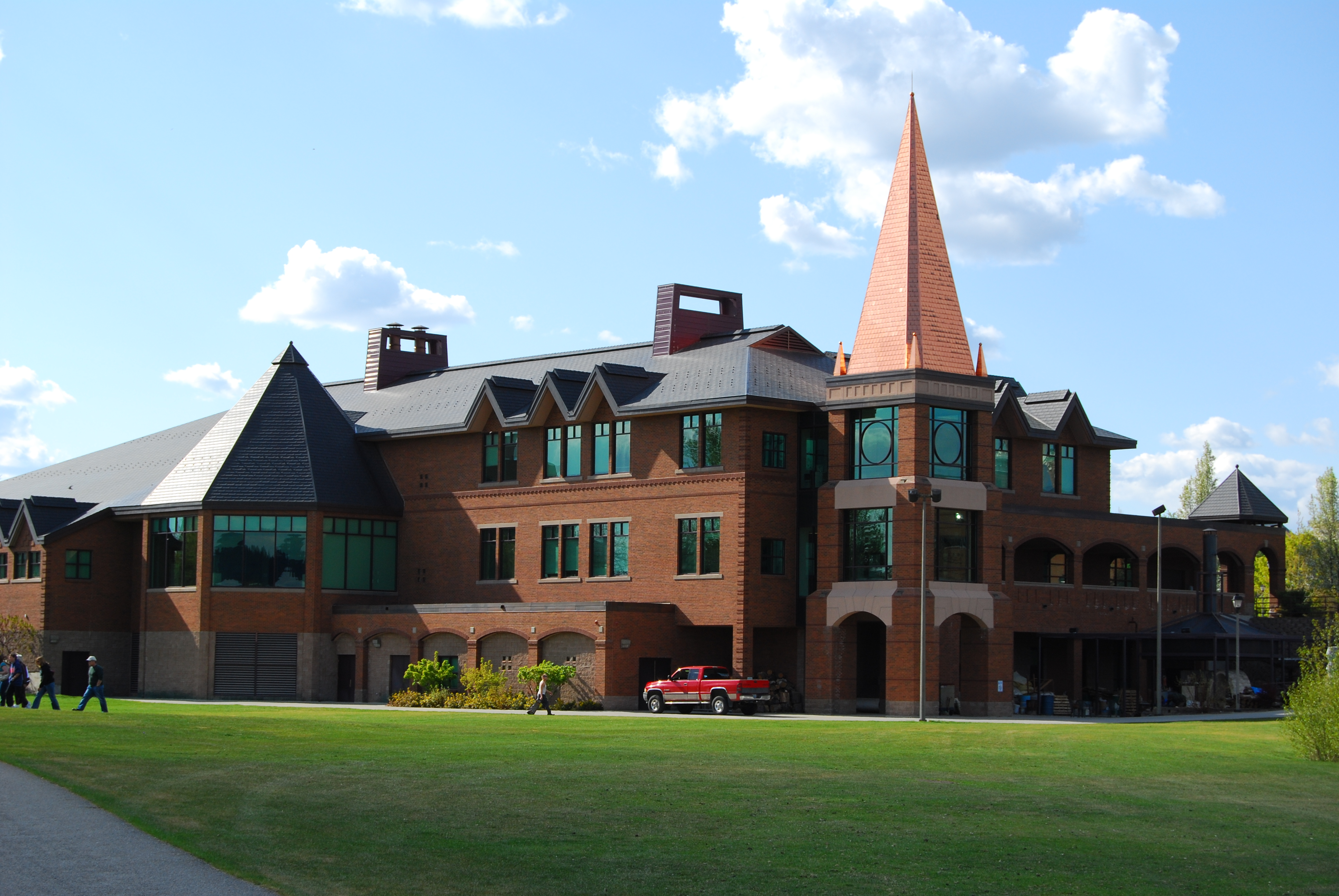
Jundt Art Museum

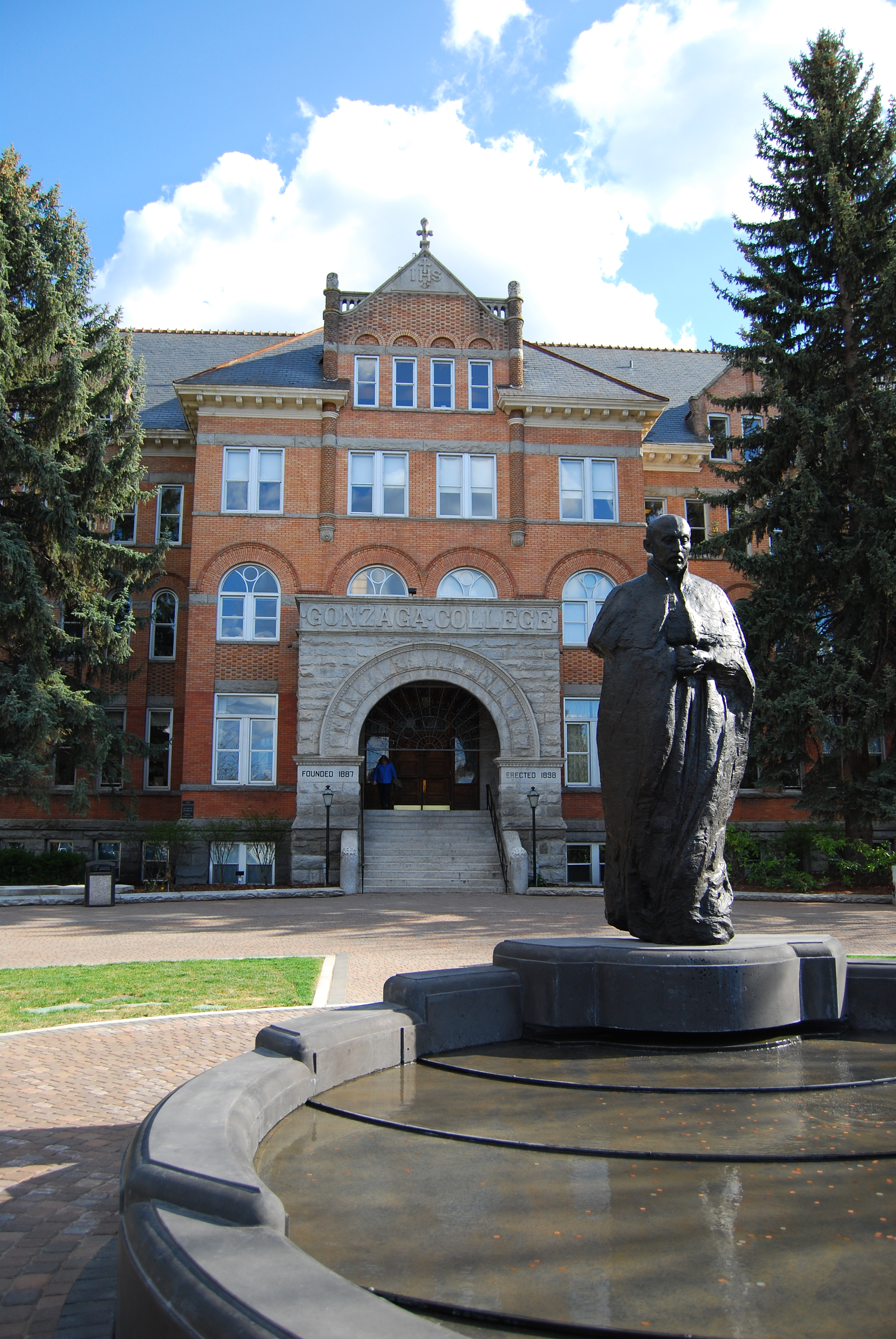
College Hall

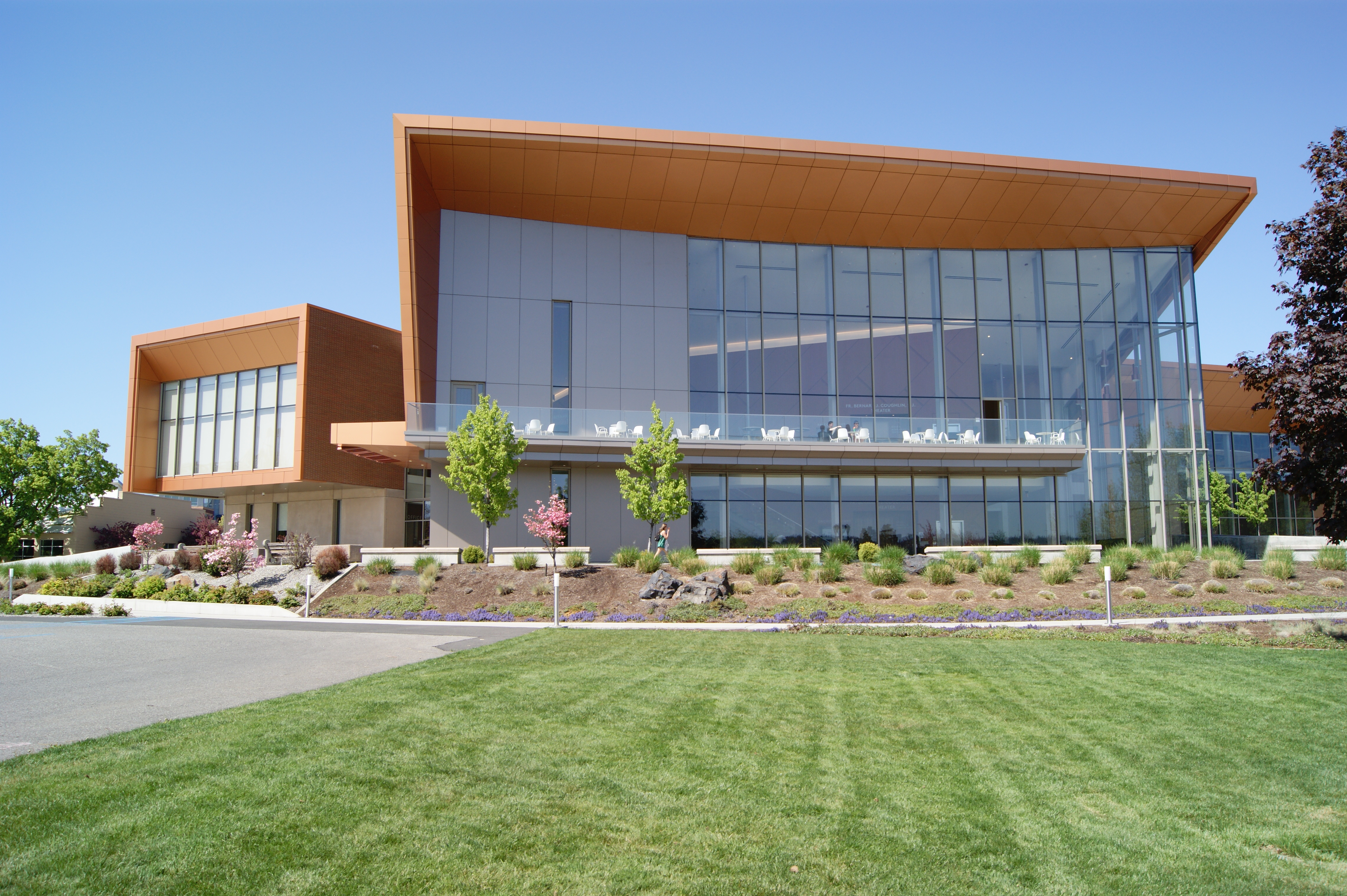
Myrtle Woldson Performing Arts Center

== Academics ==
Gonzaga's liberal arts tradition lies in its core curriculum, which integrates philosophy, religious studies, mathematics, literature, natural and social sciences, and extensive writing in each major discipline. Gonzaga has studies in 92 fields and 26 graduate programs. It has programs in preparation for professional schools in business, education, engineering, dentistry, divinity/theology, law, medicine, nursing, and veterinary medicine. It sponsors an Army ROTC program which prepares students to become commissioned officers upon graduation.

Gonzaga partners with Bishop White Seminary, located next to the campus, to prepare Catholic seminarians for the priesthood. Students may study abroad at Gonzaga's campus in Florence, Italy, or at other programs in Australia, Benin, Denmark, China, Costa Rica, England, France, Japan, Kenya, Mexico, Spain and Zambia.

As of 2015, the average class size was 23 students and there were 427 employed faculty; the student-to-faculty ratio was 11.5:1.

=== Admissions ===
Gonzaga's undergraduate admission standards are considered "more selective" by U.S. News & World Report.

For the undergraduate Class of 2021 (enrolling fall 2017), Gonzaga received 7,162 applications, accepted 4,835 (67.5%), and enrolled 1,048. The freshman enrolled for 2017 had an average GPA of 3.76, an average ACT of 27, an average SAT Critical Reading score of 597, an average Math score of 607, and an average composite score of 1204.

=== Rankings ===
Academic rankings

National
- Forbes: 153
- U.S. News & World Report: 90
- Washington Monthly: 211
- WSJ/College Pulse: 229

Gonzaga is ranked tied for 90th in the U.S. News & World Report 2027 rankings of national universities. The School of Engineering and Applied Science is ranked tied for 22nd best undergraduate engineering program nationwide at schools where doctorates are not offered. Additionally, the University was noted for its business programs which ranked, #30 in Finance, #17 in Entrepreneurship, and #21 in Accounting according to the U.S. News & World Report 2027. Forbes ranks Gonzaga the 153rd best school in the country, 87th in private colleges, and 33rd overall in the West in the 2025 top college list. Additionally, Gonzaga is listed among The Princeton Review's rankings of the best 382 colleges and in the Fiske Guide to Colleges, which ranks 321 colleges in the United States, Canada, and England. In 2022, U.S. News ranked Gonzaga's MBA in American Indian Entrepreneurship 14th in Entrepreneurship.

== Athletics ==
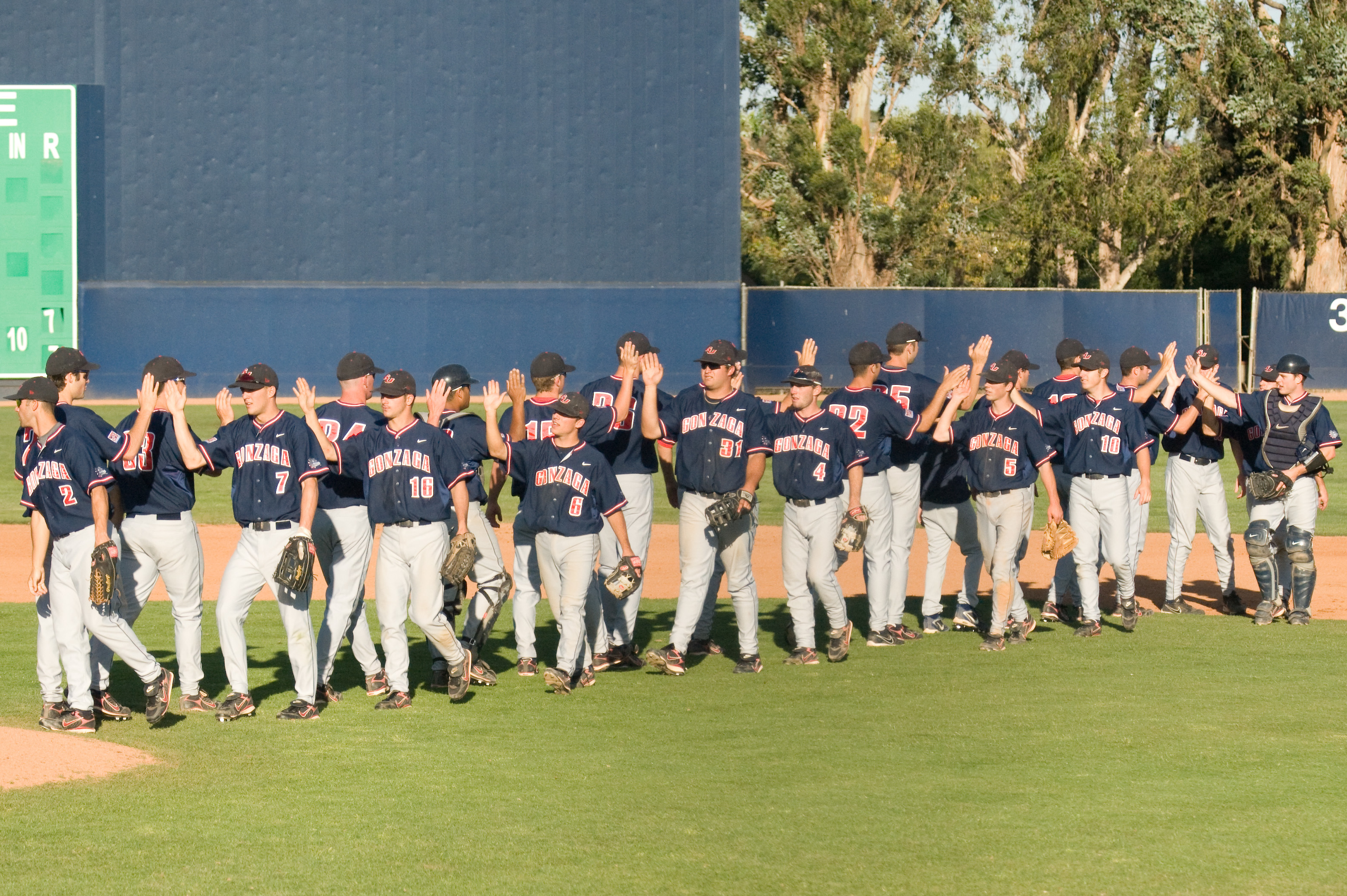
The Gonzaga Bulldogs baseball team celebrating a win at George C. Page Stadium in 2008

Gonzaga University is part of the NCAA Division I West Coast Conference. Beginning July 1, 2026, Gonzaga will be part of the Pac-12 Conference. Their official mascot is the Bulldog and players are nicknamed the Zags. Gonzaga has 16 men's and women's varsity sports, including baseball, basketball, cross country, golf, rowing, soccer, tennis, volleyball, and track and field (indoor and outdoor).

Gonzaga's men's basketball team has 22 WCC tournament championships 16 WCC regular season championships, 9 straight "Sweet 16's," produced 15 All Americans, a national CBS-Chevrolet Player of the Year and USBWA Oscar Robertson Trophy in Adam Morrison, and 10 NBA first round picks as of 2021. Additionally, in 2013, Canadian center Kelly Olynyk, a national Player of the Year finalist, was selected as a first team All American. In the 2012–13 season, Gonzaga was ranked No. 1 by the AP for the first time in school history. Its highest ranking before that came in 2004, when the Bulldogs were ranked No. 2. Gonzaga advanced to the Elite 8 of the 2015 NCAA tournament, losing to eventual national champion and No. 1 ranked Duke.

Basketball games are held in the McCarthey Athletic Center. The university's men's basketball team, which did not make its first appearance in the NCAA tournament until 1995 (more than a decade after Basketball Hall of Fame player and Gonzaga alum John Stockton graduated), made the regional finals of the NCAA tournament (the "Elite Eight") in 1999, re-appearing in the tournament every year since (As of 2026). The women's basketball team made it to the "Sweet Sixteen" in 2010.

Like many colleges, Gonzaga put its football program on hiatus during World War II; the announcement was made in April 1942. After the war the administration decided not to resume it; the program had been in financial difficulty prior to the war. Gonzaga football produced two Pro Football Hall of Famers: Tony Canadeo (1941) of the Green Bay Packers, and Ray Flaherty (1926), head coach of the Washington Redskins. In addition, Flaherty recruited former Bulldog football stars Ed Justice, George "Automatic" Karamatic, and Max Krause to play in the Redskins backfield.

=== Intramural and club sports ===
Gonzaga University has intramural and club sports for each season, open to all students, and over 72% of the student population participates at various levels from competitive to recreational. In the fall, Gonzaga has soccer, flag football, volleyball, dodgeball, 3-on-3 basketball, badminton, and various tournaments. In the winter, it has soccer, ultimate frisbee, pickleball, bench press competitions, innertube basketball, and handball tournaments. In the spring there is softball, volleyball, triathlon, soccer, and home run derbies.

Since the mid-1990s, Gonzaga has become known for its men's basketball program. The Zags (as they are popularly known) have participated in every single March Madness tournament since 1999, and were national runners up in 2017 and 2021. (see Gonzaga Bulldogs men's basketball)

Gonzaga also has an Army ROTC Ranger Challenge team, which has won 15 championships in the last 16 years. It has repeatedly won the Douglas MacArthur Award, given annually to the best Army ROTC program in the Western United States.

== Student life ==
Undergraduate demographics as of Fall 2020
Race and ethnicity	Total
White	70%
Hispanic	11%
Other (Note: Other consists of Multiracial Americans and those who prefer to not say.)	9%
Asian	6%
Foreign national	1%
Black	1%
Economic diversity
Low-income (Note: The percentage of students who received an income-based federal Pell grant intended for low-income students.)	14%
Affluent (Note: The percentage of students who are a part of the American middle class at the bare minimum.)	86%

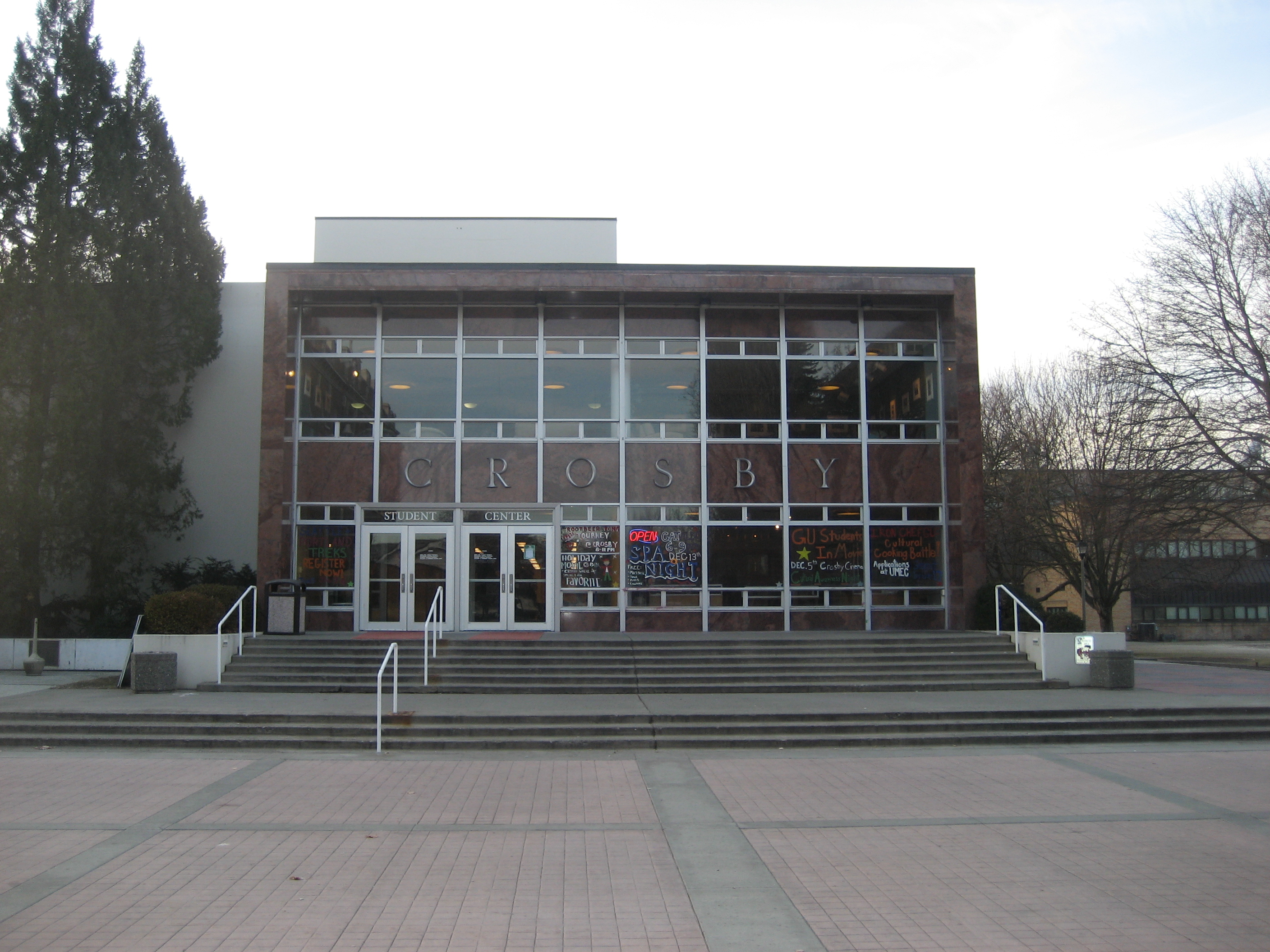
Crosby Student Center

The Gonzaga Student Body Association is in charge of the clubs and activities on campus. Elections for its offices (e.g., President, Vice President, Senator) take place annually during the spring.

More than 20 faiths are represented on campus.

== Student publications ==
The Gonzaga Bulletin is the official, weekly student newspaper of Gonzaga University. The newspaper is primarily staffed by students of the journalism and broadcasting department of the university's communication arts department; it is managed by a faculty adviser and an advisory board, which reports to the university president. The Gonzaga Bulletin is produced on the fourth floor of Gonzaga's College Hall and printed off-site in Spokane.

Spires is Gonzaga's official yearbook. It details the academic year through pictures and articles and is distributed at the beginning of each year free to all students. To ensure being included in the yearbook, students have their pictures taken during the opening weekend or Fall Family weekend.

Gonzaga Law Review is the law school's flagship legal publication, founded in 1966.

Gonzaga Journal of International Law is the School of Law's second legal journal, founded in 1997, and is published entirely online, allowing for a variety of publishing dates.

iZAG Radio is the university's student-run radio station, broadcasting music, news, and sports commentary live over internet radio.

== Alumni ==
Gonzaga University alumni include former Speaker of the United States House of Representatives Tom Foley, former Governor of the State of Washington Christine Gregoire, Academy Award-winning singer and actor Bing Crosby, NBA Hall of Fame basketball player John Stockton, Major League Baseball pitcher Eli Morgan, and world-class mountain climber Jim Wickwire.

== See also ==
- Gonzaga Preparatory School
- List of Jesuit educational institutions
- Education in Spokane, Washington
