= Robert Spitzer (priest) =

American Jesuit priest, scholar and educator (born 1952)

The Reverend Robert J. Spitzer SJ
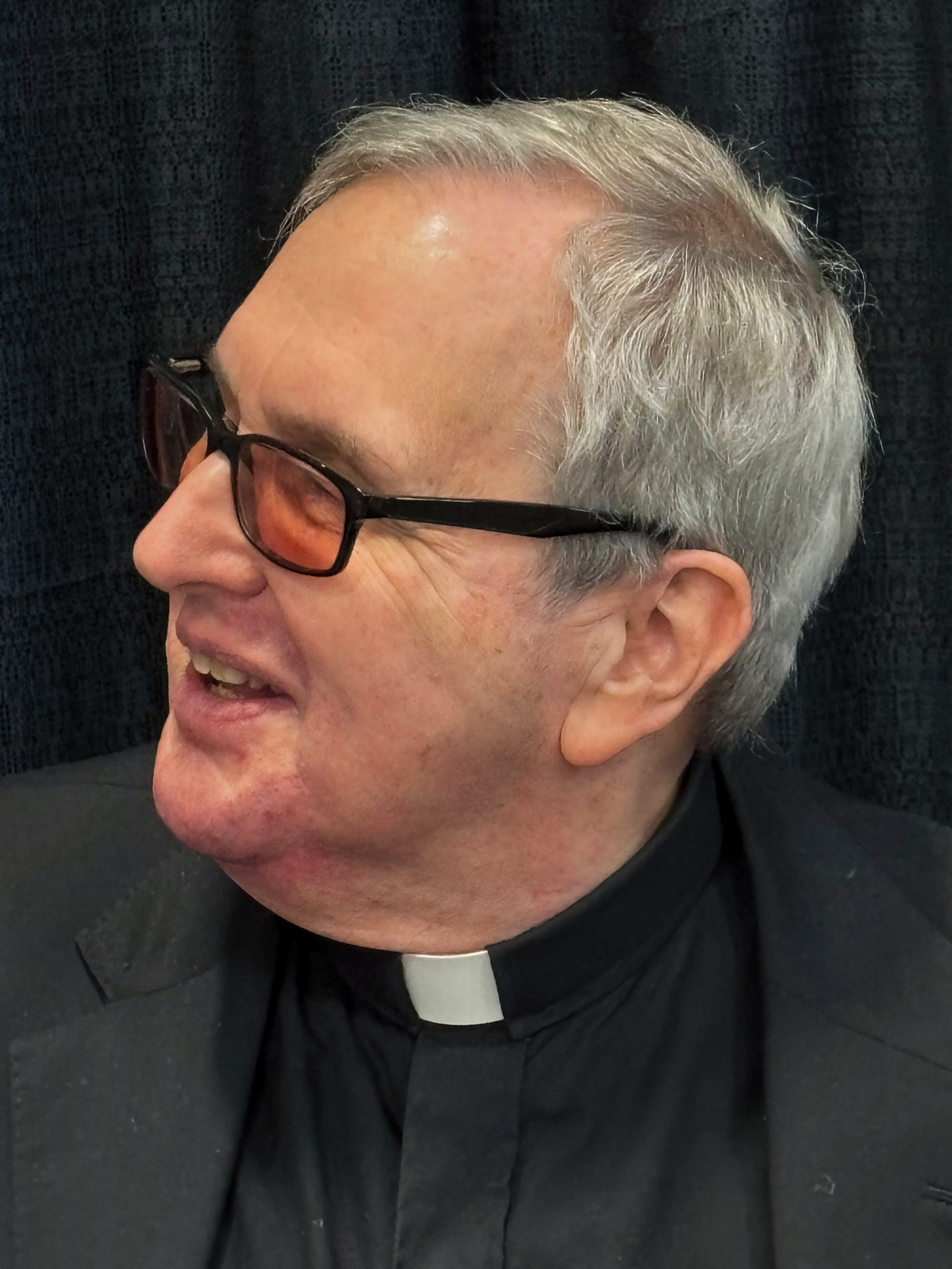
- Born: May 16, 1952 (age 74); Honolulu, Territory of Hawaii, U.S.
- Education: Gonzaga University; Saint Louis University; Pontifical Gregorian University; Weston Jesuit School of Theology; Catholic University of America
- Occupations: Jesuit priest, philosopher, educator, author, speaker
- Known for: President of Gonzaga University (1998–2009); Founder of the Magis Center; Founder of the Spitzer Center for Ethical Leadership
- Title: President Emeritus of Gonzaga University

Robert J. Spitzer (born May 16, 1952) is an American Jesuit priest, philosopher, educator, author, speaker, and retired President of Gonzaga University in Spokane, Washington.

Spitzer founded and currently serves as president of the Magis Center of Reason and Faith, a non-profit organization dedicated to developing educational materials on the complementarity of science, philosophy, and faith. He is also president of the Spitzer Center of Ethical Leadership, dedicated to helping Catholic and for-profit organizations develop leadership, constructive cultures, and virtue ethics.

== Early life ==
Robert J. Spitzer was born in Honolulu, then the United States Territory of Hawaii, on May 16, 1952, the son of Arthur H. Spitzer and Blanche H. Van Oort Spitzer. He went to Punahou School, graduating in 1970 as a member of the National Honor Society.

== Education ==
Spitzer received a Bachelor of Business Administration degree with a focus on public accounting and finance (magna cum laude) from Gonzaga University in 1974.

He earned a master's degree in philosophy from St. Louis University (magna cum laude) in 1978, a Master of Divinity degree from the Gregorian University in Rome (summa cum laude) in 1983, a Master of Theology degree in Scripture (summa cum laude) in 1984 from the Weston School of Theology (later the Weston Jesuit School of Theology) then located in Cambridge, Massachusetts, and a Doctor of Philosophy degree from the Catholic University of America in Washington, DC (summa cum laude), in 1988. His dissertation, under Paul Weiss, is entitled A Study of Objectively Real Time.

== Academic career ==
Spitzer began his teaching career at St. Louis University as a teaching assistant in 1978. He continued at Seattle University as an instructor of philosophy from 1978 to 1980. He taught as an assistant professor of philosophy at Georgetown University from 1984 to 1990, where he received the Bunn Medal for Most Outstanding Faculty Member in 1989.

He proceeded to Seattle University (1990–98) where he was tenured as an associate professor of philosophy in 1996. During that time he held the Frank Shrontz chair of professional ethics (1997–1998) and won the award for outstanding faculty member in the College of Arts and Sciences in 1997.

On September 17, 1998, Spitzer was inaugurated as the 25th President of Gonzaga University where he remained until 2009.

After his presidency at Gonzaga University, Spitzer was the Rector of JSerra Catholic High School in San Juan Capistrano, California.

== Religious career ==
Spitzer entered the Oregon Province of the Society of Jesus in August 1974. He took his first religious vows in August 1976. He was ordained a priest in June 1983, and professed the fourth vow particular to the Society in April 1994. His theological interests focus on two areas: fundamental theology and New Testament scripture studies. He is the co-director of the Institute on Faith and Reason at Gonzaga University.

Spitzer's interests in New Testament scripture studies focus on Christology, his thesis at the Gregorian University in Rome was entitled, The Influence of Sophia Speculation on Early Christological Hymns. His thesis at the Weston School in Cambridge, for which he won the American Bible Society award, is entitled, The Depth Grammar of "Pneuma" and "En Christo" in I Cor: 12.

He completed a book on Christology entitled, God So Loved the World : Clues to Our Transcendent Destiny from the Revelation of Jesus which was published by Ignatius Press in 2016.

Spitzer has served the Church in a variety of different capacities: as an advisor to the Theological Committee of the Washington State Catholic Conference between 1994 and 1998 as spiritual director to contemplative religious communities, as advisor to lay religious groups, and as a lecturer in Catholic Higher Education, fundamental theology, Christology, ecclesiology and spirituality. He has also been a featured guest and series host on the Eternal Word Television Network.

Spitzer belongs to several Catholic professional associations: the Association of Catholic Colleges and Universities, the Association of Jesuit Colleges and Universities, the American Catholic Philosophical Association, the Jesuit Philosophical Association, and the Fellowship of Catholic Scholars.

== Founder of institutes and organizations ==
Spitzer has founded or co-founded five institutes and organizations since 1987:

=== The Magis Center of Reason and Faith ===
Upon his retirement from Gonzaga, Spitzer founded the Magis Institute, located at the Christ Cathedral in Garden Grove, California, which produces books, articles, documentaries, videos, and new media materials on the complementarity of science, philosophy, and faith—particularly physics, cosmology, philosophy of science, and metaphysics. It also produces high school programs, college programs, and adult education programs on a separate website, Credible Catholic. In 2021, Magis Institute created an additional website, the Purposeful Universe that provides scientific evidence for order in and a purpose behind the universe.

As president, Spitzer continues to write, teach, and speak widely on the issues of philosophy of science, metaphysics, theology, and ethics.

On 10 September 2010, Spitzer was a panelist on a full-hour prime-time feature with Stephen Hawking dealing with the relationship of faith and reason on Larry King Live (CNN). The program also featured noted author Deepak Chopra and Hawking's co-author, Leonard Mlodinow.

=== Spitzer Center of Ethical Leadership ===
Spitzer founded this organization in 2005 in Ann Arbor, Michigan. The organization focuses on developing leadership, constructive cultures, and virtue ethics in Catholic and for-profit organizations.

=== Colleagues in Jesuit Business Education ===
Located in Seattle and Spokane, Washington — co-founded by Spitzer in 1993, who remains active in its leadership. This organization helps business faculty in Jesuit universities to develop modules in ethics, service, social responsibility, and spirituality—commensurate with the educational ideals of the Society of Jesus (the Jesuits). It also publishes the annual Journal of Jesuit Business Education.

=== Healing the Culture ===
A Seattle-based organization co-founded by Spitzer in 1998, who remains active in its leadership. This organization is dedicated to developing educational materials on the philosophical underpinnings of the life issues—particularly "beginning of life" and "end of life" issues. It addresses how these issues affect and are affected by the notions of "happiness", "virtue", "freedom", "love", "personhood", "suffering", and "the common good".

=== University Faculty for Life ===
A Washington, DC, organization founded by Spitzer, University Faculty for Life began in 1989. This organization is devoted to promoting research, dialogue, and publication by faculty who respect the value of human life from conception to natural death. It holds an annual conference at different universities and publishes its annual proceedings -- Life and Learning. In 2017, Fr. Spitzer was awarded the Rubert & Timothy Smith Award, the organization's highest award for excellence in scholarship.

== Writing and publications ==
Books

- The Spirit of Leadership: Optimizing Creativity and Change in Organizations (Provo, Utah: Executive Excellence Publishers, June 2000).
- Healing the Culture: A Commonsense Philosophy of Happiness, Freedom and the Life Issues (San Francisco: Ignatius Press, 2000).
- Five Pillars of the Spiritual Life: A Practical Guide for Active People (San Francisco: Ignatius Press, 2008).
- New Proofs for the Existence of God: Contributions of Contemporary Physics and Philosophy (Grand Rapids, MI: Eerdmans, 2010).
- Ten Universal Principles: A Brief Philosophy of the Life Issues (San Francisco: Ignatius Press, 2011).
- Evidence for God from Contemporary Physics: Extending the Legacy of Monsignor Georges Lemaitre (South Bend, IN: St. Augustine's Press, 2015).
- Finding True Happiness: Satisfying Our Restless Hearts (San Francisco: Ignatius Press, 2015).
- The Soul's Upward Yearning: Clues to our Transcendent Nature from Experience and Reason (San Francisco: Ignatius Press, 2015).
- God So Loved the World: Clues to our Transcendent Destiny from the Revelation of Jesus (San Francisco: Ignatius Press, 2016).
- The Light Shines on in the Darkness: Transforming Suffering through Faith (San Francisco: Ignatius Press, 2017)
- Christ Versus Satan in Our Daily Lives : The Cosmic Struggle Between Good and Evil (San Francisco: Ignatius Press, 2020)

Articles

- Definitions of Real Time and Ultimate Reality (Journal of Ultimate Reality and Meaning, Vol 23:3, Sept 2000) pp 260–276, for which he received the section editors’ award for the best article between 1999 and 2001
- Proofs for the Existence of God Part I: A Metaphysical Argument (International Philosophical Quarterly, Vol 41:2, June 2001) pp 162–186.
- Proofs for the Existence of God Part II: A Cosmological Argument and a Lonerganian Argument (International Philosophical Quarterly, Vol 41:3, Sept 2001) pp 305–331.
- Indications of Creation in Contemporary Astrophysics (Journal of Ultimate Reality and Meaning, Vol 24:3, Sept 2001) pp. 1–50.
- Indications of Creation in Contemporary Big Bang Cosmology. (Philosophy in Science, Vol 10, 2003, pp 35–106.)
- Indications of Supernatural Design in Big Bang Cosmology (Journal of Ultimate Reality and Meaning, Vol 27:4, December 2004) pp 265–287
- Getting to the Heart of Ethics (Journal of Business and Professional Ethics, Vol 25:1, Spring 2006)
- ' with James Sinclair: "Fine-tuning and Indications of Transcendent Intelligence" in Theism and Atheism: Philosophical Arguments in Opposition" (New York: Macmillan Reference, 2019)
- ' A Contemporary Metaphysical Proof of the Existence of God" in International Philosophical Quarterly, Dec. 2019, pp. 1–50

He has published other articles in a variety of journals and collections concerned with leadership, metaphysics, ethics, ontology of physics, and higher education.

Father Spitzer has appeared on several national television programs, including Larry King Live (discussing creation and the universe with Stephen Hawking, Leonard Mlodinow, and Deepak Chopra), The History Channel (discussing creation and the universe), The Today Show (discussing euthanasia), and PBS—Closer to the Light (discussing God and creation).

He has a weekly nationwide television program on EWTN called "Father Spitzer's Universe." He also produced eleven television series for EWTN since 1998 (see EWTN catalog).
