= David J. Apol =

American government official

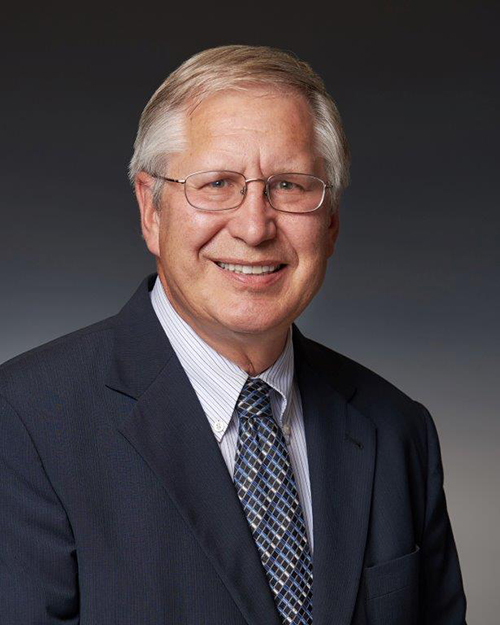

Director of the United States Office of Government Ethics
- Acting; July 20, 2017 – July 13, 2018
- President: Donald Trump
- Preceded by: Walter Shaub
- Succeeded by: Emory Rounds

Personal details
- Education: Wheaton College (BA); University of Michigan (JD)

David John Apol is General Counsel at the United States Office of Government Ethics (OGE). He served as an acting director of the OGE between the resignation of Walter Shaub on July 19, 2017 and the appointment of Emory Rounds on July 13, 2018.

== Career ==
After graduating from law school, Apol interned with the Governor of Michigan before serving in the United States Army for four years. In the Army, Apol served in the Judge Advocate General's Corps for the Strategic Missile Defense Command.

While interning for the Governor, Apol reviewed financial disclosure reports, which would later earn him an appointment as Counsel for the Senate Ethics Committee from 1987 to 1992. During his time with the Ethics Committee, he investigated a Senator for improperly accepting gifts. Apol had considered that Senator a role model while studying for his undergraduate degree. He left the Senate Ethics Committee for a role as Counsel for the Department of Labor’s Ethics Program from 1992 to 2000.

=== Office of Government Ethics ===
Apol was appointed as General Counsel of the Office of Government Ethics in January 2014. He held a number of positions with the Federal Government, including a prior appointment as Associate Counsel with OGE, prior to 2014.

Ideally, laws would reflect sound ethics and morals, but not always. It’s very hard to keep broad rules from permitting actions they’re supposed to prevent while permitting actions that are completely innocent. At the same time, the more complex you make the rules, the harder they are to follow.

— David J. Apol, 2015 Wheaton magazine profile

Apol was named acting director by President Donald Trump on July 21, 2017 following the resignation of Walter Shaub who criticised that the Trump Administration would hold ethics as irrelevant. The appointment by President Trump disrupted the regular order of succession, as under agency rules adopted in 2015, Shaub's chief of staff, Shelley Finlayson, would have assumed the acting director role. Shaub criticized the appointment of Apol, saying "moves like [Apol's history of advocating for consultation with the White House prior to issuing policies] jeopardize O.G.E.'s independence."

Following the resignation of Health and Human Services Secretary Tom Price over travel on private charter flights, Apol issued a letter to agency heads in October 2017 asking them to ensure their actions are "motivated by the public good and not by personal interests."

In February 2018, President Trump nominated Emory Rounds to become the permanent OGE director, and his appointment was confirmed on July 13. Apol returned to his previous position of General Counsel.

== Personal life ==
Apol graduated from Wheaton College in 1979, and earned his J.D. from the University of Michigan Law School in 1982. He is married to Catherine A. Novelli, who he met in law school. Novelli served as the Under Secretary of State for Economic Growth, Energy, and the Environment from 2014 to 2017. Together they have two children.

Political offices
Preceded by Walter Shaub	Director of the United States Office of Government Ethics (Acting); 2017–2018	Incumbent
