= Emory Rounds =

American lawyer and ethics official

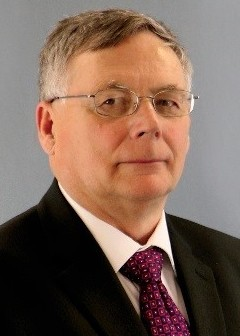

Director of the United States Office of Government Ethics
- In office July 13, 2018 – July 3, 2023
- President: Donald Trump; Joe Biden
- Preceded by: Walter Shaub
- Succeeded by: David Huitema

Personal details
- Born: Emory Arthur Rounds III
- Education: University of Massachusetts, Amherst (BA); University of Akron (JD)

Emory Arthur Rounds III is an American attorney and government ethics official who is a former director of the United States Office of Government Ethics. He was nominated by President Donald Trump to serve a five-year term.

== Career ==
Rounds served as an ethics attorney at the United States Department of Commerce and in the Judge Advocate General's Office in the U.S. Navy, where he attained the rank of Commander. Rounds served as an ethics counsel for six years in the White House Counsel's Office during the administration of George W. Bush, and subsequently served as an associate counsel at the U.S. Office of Government Ethics.

On February 8, 2018, President Donald Trump announced his intent to nominate Rounds to the office of Director of the Office of Government Ethics for a term of five years. He stepped down on July 12, 2023 after his term ended.

== Personal life ==
Rounds is a graduate of King Philip Regional High School, in Wrentham, Massachusetts. He earned his BA in English from the University of Massachusetts Amherst, and his Juris Doctor from the University of Akron.

He is married with five children, and is a resident of southern Maine.

Political offices
Preceded by David J. Apol; Acting	Director of the United States Office of Government Ethics	Incumbent
