= Fill the Cup =

World Food Programme campaign

Fill the Cup is a campaign of the United Nations World Food Programme (WFP), the world's largest humanitarian aid agency. In 2009, WFP plans to feed over 100 million people in 77 of the world's poorest countries. "Fill the Cup" aims to use the symbol of the Red Cup to raise awareness of global hunger, specifically involving hungry school children. About 59 million primary school age children attend school hungry across the developing world, with 23 million of them in 45 African countries.

== Background ==
The symbol of the Red Cup originates from the many plastic, red cups, usually filled with porridge and other meals, used to feed school children in WFP School feeding programmes. When WFP Executive Director Josette Sheeran began working at the World Food Programme, she was given one of these red cups with the name ‘Lily’ scratched onto the bottom (having been discarded by Lily upon receiving her new cup). Seeing that the cup was a powerful visual tool to help show the world how little food it takes to make a huge difference to a child's life, Sheeran never travels without it.

The Red Cup is a symbol that simultaneously defines the challenges facing WFP and the struggle for survival that is a daily concern for those living on the edge of poverty. An empty cup symbolizes hunger, malnutrition, and often disease, hungry families, children out of school, and weakened communities. A full cup represents health, education, hope, productive families, and strong communities.

=== Funding ===
The World Food Programme is entirely dependent on voluntary donations. Each year, WFP depends entirely on the generosity of governments, private companies and members of the public to fund its operations. In 2007, 80 percent of the money WFP spent on purchasing food was used to buy food in 69 developing countries. These purchases, in places like Ethiopia, Uganda and Pakistan, are a key investment in fragile agricultural economies. Unlike cash that is given to beneficiaries, the local purchasing policy is a cash transfer that carries an investment dimension in that farmers are being paid for the production of food.

== AC Milan's Kaká and "Fill the Cup" ==
The "World Footballer of the Year", Kaka, was one of the first global celebrities to endorse the "Fill the Cup" campaign. Kaka, is a world cup winning player with the Brazil national team and he combines his professional career as a player for AC Milan with a role as a WFP Hunger Ambassador. In February 2008, he supported a launch event for "Fill the Cup" in the northern Italian city of Milan, participating in a news conference alongside WFP Executive Director, Josette Sheeran, and President John Kufuor of Ghana.

As WFP's youngest "Ambassador Against Hunger", Kaka has used his international profile to focus the attention of world football's enormous fan base on the challenge WFP faces in addressing global hunger. "I owe a lot to soccer," Kaka says, "Now I'd like to give something back and bring hope to hungry kids less fortunate than myself."

== Drew Barrymore and the Campaign ==
In March 2008, WFP Ambassador Against Hunger, American actress Drew Barrymore, donated US$1 million to the World Food Programme on The Oprah Winfrey Show. Part of her donation will go toward feeding thousands of children in Kenya. “I have seen with my own eyes what a difference a simple cup of nutritious porridge can make in a child’s life,” said Drew Barrymore. "It helps them learn, stay healthy and sets them on track for a bright future. I urge everyone -- everywhere -- to help WFP 'Fill the Cup' for hungry children, and make hunger history," she said.

On the television program, Executive Director Josette Sheeran explained that for 25 US cents a day, WFP can provide a school meal which feeds bodies, and minds and transforms children's lives. "Just US$50 fills a child’s cup for a year, and we call on everyone to click on wfp.org and make a donation," said Sheeran. Barrymore has travelled to Kenya twice in two years to see first-hand the impact hunger has on poor children. She is an ardent advocate for WFP school meals which boost children's chances for health, education and a more promising future.

== School feeding programmes ==
School feeding programmes serve as a magnet to bring children to school, and to improve their ability to learn and concentrate. They are also among the most effective tools for increasing access to education and improving the nutritional status of children. For a minimal investment, lives can be transformed in fundamental ways. Many developed nations, including Japan, United States, United Kingdom, Italy and France, have long histories of supporting national school feeding programmes – a testament to the vitality and effectiveness of these programmes.

WFP now provides meals to an average of 20 million children in school - almost half of whom are girls. Within the past four decades, 28 countries have graduated from WFP school feeding programmes, and most are now providing school feeding on their own. WFP school meals are a major incentive for poor families to send their children to school. As a result, school enrolment and attendance rates are much higher in schools where meals are provided. Many children who lack food are unable to learn, meaning they lose an opportunity for personal development which ends up costing their family, community and economy.

== Sources ==
- WFP Report: Food for Education Works; 2007.
- Schultz, T.P. 2001: Why governments should invest more to educate girls. Discussion paper 836. Yale University
- Economic Growth Center, New Haven, Conn; Schultz T.W. 1963: The Economic Value of Education. New York: Columbia University Press; reported in: UN Millennium Project Task Force on Education 2005.
- Psacharopoulos, G. and Patrinos, HA 2004: Returns to Investment in Education: A Further Update. Education Economics, 2004, vol. 12, issue 2, pages 111-134.
- Essential Package of Health and Nutrition School-based Interventions; WFP School Feeding.
