= Jeff Hart =

Jeff Hart may refer to:

- Jeffrey Hart (1930–2019), American writer and academic
- Jeffrey A. Hart (born 1947), professor of political science
- Jeff Hart (golfer) (born 1960), American professional golfer
- Jeff Hart (gridiron football) (born 1953), American football player
- Jeff Hart (Love of Life), character of the soap opera Love of Life

== See also ==
- Jeffery Hart Bent (1781–1852), Australian jurist
