= Sharon Brown-Hruska =

Commissioner of the Commodity Futures Tradeing Commission

Sharon Brown Hruska

Member of the Commodity Futures Trading Commission
- In office August 7, 2002 - July 28, 2006
- President: George W. Bush

Acting Chairperson of the Commodity Futures Trading Commission
- In office August 24, 2004 - July 10, 2005
- President: George W. Bush
- Preceded by: James E. Newsome
- Succeeded by: Reuben Jeffery III

Sharon Brown-Hruska is the former Acting Chairman and Commissioner of the Commodity Futures Trading Commission (CFTC). She was designated as the Acting Chairman of the CFTC by President George W. Bush in 2004 and served in the role until 2005. She also served as a Commissioner of the CFTC for two terms under President Bush.

== Career ==
Brown-Hruska was first nominated to serve as Commissioner for the CFTC on April 9, 2002 and was confirmed by the Senate on August 2, 2002. On July 22, 2004, she was nominated by President Bush for a second term as Commissioner and served until April 13, 2009. Brown-Hruska also served as Acting Chairman of the CFTC when President Bush designated her to the position on July 26, 2004. She served until July 10, 2005.

Prior to joining the CFTC, Brown-Hruska was an Assistant Professor of Finance at George Mason University and Tulane University. She sits on the board of all women Athena SPAC vehicle Athena Technology Acquisition Corp. II.

== Personal life ==
Brown-Hruska holds a B.A., M.A., and Ph.D. from Virginia Tech.

She is a native of Winchester, Virginia and lives with her husband and son in Burke, Virginia.
