= John E. Jeuck =

- Born: John Edward Jeuck; October 17, 1916; Chicago, Illinois, U.S.
- Died: December 18, 2009 (aged 93); Evanston, Illinois, U.S.
- Education: University of Chicago (BA, MBA, PhD)
- Occupation(s): Dean, Professor

John Edward Jeuck (October 17, 1916 – December 18, 2009) was an American professor of business and dean (1952–1955) of the University of Chicago Booth School of Business. He was best known for his work on business history and corporate strategy, especially his profile of Sears in his 1950 book Catalogues and Counters: A History of Sears, Roebuck and Company with Boris Emmet. The book received the national award of the American Marketing Association in 1951.

Jeuck was born in Chicago, Illinois. He spent most of his career at the University of Chicago, receiving his Bachelor of Arts in 1937, Master of Business Administration in 1938, and PhD in 1949. He served in the United States Navy Reserve from 1942 to 1946 and was a Lieutenant. He joined the University faculty three years before he received his PhD. As dean, he changed the school's curriculum and helped establish a downtown campus for part-time MBA students. Jeuck also increased faculty retention by eliminating a requirement that professors give their consulting fees to the school. The old policy often led to professors giving the University more money than they earned in salary. He served as a professor of business administration at Harvard Business School from 1955 to 1958. He returned in 1958 to the University of Chicago when he was named the Robert Law Professor of Business Administration. In 2003, former students and friends (including Philip J. Purcell of Morgan Stanley, J. William Uhrig, and Peter G. Peterson of the Blackstone Group) helped him establish the Distinguished Fellows Program at the University, which provides five MBA students with a scholarship, stipend, and mentoring by Harry Davis, The University of Chicago Booth School of Business Roger L. and Rachel M. Goetz Distinguished Service Professor of Creative Management.

He received the McKinsey Award for Excellence in Teaching in 1979 and retired from teaching in 1988. During his career, he served as a consultant to over a dozen companies, including Sears, IBM, and Coca-Cola. He also served as a director of The Walgreen Company and was a visiting professor at Stanford University, Dartmouth College, and the University of North Carolina.

Academic offices
| Preceded by Garfield V. Cox | Dean of the University of Chicago School of Business; 1952–1955 | Succeeded by W. Allen Wallis |
