= Robert Hormats =

American government official (born 1943)

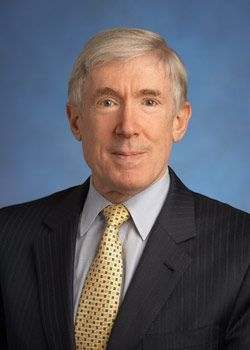

18th Under Secretary of State for Economic Growth, Energy, and the Environment
- In office September 23, 2009 – July 31, 2013
- President: Barack Obama
- Preceded by: Reuben Jeffery III
- Succeeded by: Catherine A. Novelli

15th Assistant Secretary of State for Economic and Business Affairs
- In office 1981–1982
- Preceded by: Deane R. Hinton
- Succeeded by: Richard T. McCormack

Personal details
- Born: April 13, 1943 (age 83) Baltimore, Maryland
- Party: Democratic
- Education: Tufts University (BA, MA, PhD)

Robert David "Bob" Hormats (born April 13, 1943, in Baltimore, Maryland) is Vice Chairman of Kissinger Associates.

== Early life and education ==
Hormats graduated from the high school Baltimore City College in 1961.

Graduated from Tufts University, he received a Bachelor of Arts degree (with a concentration in economics and political science) in 1965, a Master of Arts in Law and Diplomacy in 1966, and a Doctor of Philosophy degree in international economics in 1970.

== Career ==
Prior he served as Under Secretary of State for Economic Growth, Energy, and the Environment (at the time, entitled Under Secretary of State for Economic, Business, and Agricultural Affairs) from 2009 to 2013. Hormats was formerly Vice Chairman of Goldman Sachs (International), which he joined in 1982. He served as Senior Deputy Assistant Secretary, from 1977 to 1979, and Assistant Secretary of State, from 1981 to 1982, at the Bureau of Economic and Business Affairs (formerly Bureau of Economic, Energy, and Business Affairs).

He was Ambassador and Deputy United States Trade Representative from 1979 to 1981. He served as a senior staff member for International Economic Affairs on the United States National Security Council from 1969 to 1977, where he was senior economic adviser to Henry Kissinger, General Brent Scowcroft and Zbigniew Brzezinski. He helped to manage the Nixon administration's opening of diplomatic relations with China's communist government. He was a recipient of the French Legion of Honor in 1982 and the Arthur S. Flemming Award in 1974.

Hormats has been a visiting lecturer at Princeton University and served on the Board of Visitors of the Fletcher School of Law and Diplomacy at Tufts University and the Dean’s Council of the John F. Kennedy School of Government at Harvard University.

=== Publications ===
His publications include The Price of Liberty: Paying for America's Wars from the Revolution to the War on Terror; Abraham Lincoln and the Global Economy; American Albatross: The Foreign Debt Dilemma; and Reforming the International Monetary System. Other publications include articles in Foreign Affairs, Foreign Policy, The New York Times, The Washington Post, The Wall Street Journal, American Banker and The Financial Times.

=== Boards and membership ===
Hormats is an honorary trustee of the Institute for Education (IFE). He played a role in the founding of the Center for International Education (CIE) at the Washington International School.

He is a member of Securing America's Future Energy (SAFE), the Economic Club of New York, the International Bank for Reconstruction and Development, the Irvington Institute for Immunological Research, Engelhard Corporation, and a former member of the Rockefeller Center Club, the Pacific Council on Foreign Policy, and Freedom House. Hormats is also a member of board of directors of the Overseas Private Investment Corporation (OPIC) Hormats has been a guest scholar at the Brookings Institution and a visiting lecturer at Princeton University. He is a member of the Trilateral Commission and is on the board of directors of the Hungarian-American Enterprise Fund, and the Council on Foreign Relations, as well as being on the board of overseers of Tufts University.

Hormats is a member of the Atlantic Council' s Board of Directors.

=== Points of view ===
Hormats has been a supporter of legislation that would increase investments in infrastructure in America through a national bank that would develop public-private partnerships for large transportation projects. "It's a high national priority," Hormats told Congressional Quarterly in March 2008. "Public-private cooperation is a really critical part. The needs are urgent." He and others argue that U.S. transportation infrastructure has lagged behind foreign competitors. Unless the country picks up the pace, it will not be able to support its growing trade and population.

He is an advocate of enhancing intelligence capabilities, modernizing military equipment and spending more money on preparing first-responders like firemen and emergency medical technicians for crises. He worries that future presidential administrations will spend less than they should on homeland security because to do so will require raising taxes or cutting non-defense programs. He also worries that the unpopularity of the Iraq war will cause the country to reduce its military presence overseas.

Hormats has argued that China and America are financially intertwined. It would not be in China’s financial interest, he argued, to destabilize the dollar by recalling the country’s vast loans to the U.S. Doing so would result in a shrunken export market for China. Hormats calls this MAD—mutually assured depression. In 2004, the government fined Goldman Sachs $2 million for illegally and selectively promoting the stock of four Asian companies that were about to go public. According to the Securities and Exchange Commission, Hormats and others "made illegal offerings of securities to select customers in 1999 and 2000 and made inappropriate statements to the press." Hormats told four media outlets that PetroChina, a Chinese-based oil producer, was not invested in Darfur. The disclosure was illegal under SEC rules, because the company had not yet gone public, and Hormats would not have been allowed to comment until it had done so.

== Personal life ==
Hormats is Jewish. On November 16, 2009, Hormats received the Executive Leadership Award from the Aish Center. Hormats was married in 2015 to Catherine Azmoodeh, a woman 40 years his junior. It was the first marriage for each.

== See also ==
- List of Baltimore City College people

Government offices
Preceded by Reuben Jeffery III	Under Secretary of State for Economic Growth, Energy, and the Environment; September 23, 2009 – July 31, 2013	Succeeded by Catherine Novelli
