= Aseem Prakash =

Aseem Prakash is a professor of Political Science, the Walker Family Professor of the College of music and Sciences and the Founding Director of the UW Center for Environmental Politics. He serves as the General Editor of the Cambridge University Press Series on Business and Public Policy and the Associate Editor of Business & Society. In addition to serving on editorial boards of several additional journals, he has been elected as the Vice-President of the International Studies Association (2015-2016). Professor Prakash is a member of National Academies of Sciences, Engineering, and Medicine's Board on Environmental Change and Society and International Research Fellow at the Center for Corporate Reputation, University of Oxford. He was elected to the position of the Vice President of the International Studies Association for the period, 2015-2016. He is the recipient of International Studies Association, International Political Economy Section's 2019 Distinguished Scholar Award that recognizes "outstanding senior scholars whose influence and path-breaking intellectual work will continue to impact the field for years to come as well as the Associations' 2018 James N. Rosenau Award for "scholar who has made the most important contributions to globalization studies". The European Consortium for Political Research Standing Group on Regulatory Governance awarded him the 2018 Regulatory Studies Development Award that recognizes a senior scholar who has made notable "contributions to the field of regulatory governance."

His most prominent contribution pertains to the club approach to the study of voluntary programs in the context of business firms, and extended it to the context of the non-profit sector. Outside actors do not fully know how firms or nonprofits are functioning internally. Voluntary programs are a signaling mechanism to convey this information to outside actors in a credible way. Because participation in such programs in costly, participants need to get something in return. The club approach suggests that club membership allows members to appropriate certain benefits which are non-rival and excludable (i.e., have the characteristics of club goods). These can pertain to reputation, goodwill, access to capital, regulatory relief, etc. Given that voluntary programs tend to have varying levels of effectiveness, the club approach helps to predict ex-ante how program design affects program efficacy.

In addition to his work on environmental issues, he is among the second wave scholars who suggest examining NGOs from a collective action perspective. The first ways scholars suggest that NGOs are somehow different from firms and governments because they are guided by principled concerns, not instrumental reasons. Nonprofit scholars claim that nonprofits are more reliable than firms because they are subject to the non-distributional constraint: that is, they can generate profits but cannot distribute them. The second wave scholars question these assertions on both theoretical and empirical grounds. For them, NGOs and nonprofits are guided by both instrumental reasons and principled beliefs. Further, managers have several ways of circumventing the non-distributional constraint and using organizational resources to their advantage. Indeed, the low entry barriers in establishing nonprofits has led the nonprofit/NGO pool to be contaminated with purely instrumental organizations. The collective action approach provides an analytic and systematic approach to study nonprofits and NGOs. Insights about voluntary regulation which have been developed in the context of the for-profit sector travel quite well to the study of the non-profit sector.

His other prominent contribution pertains to the role of trade and FDI networks in influencing regulatory races in areas such as human rights, labor rights, environmental policies.

Aseem Prakash has written and edited several books and articles on the subjects of corporate environmentalism, NGOs, and globalization. He also contributes to public scholarship via platforms such as The Conversation, Slate, The Washington Post, Huffpost, Regulatory Review, The Hill, and opendemocracy.

== Bibliography ==
=== As author ===
- Greening the Firm: The Politics of Corporate Environmentalism (Cambridge University Press, 2000, ISBN 978-0-521-66487-5)
- The Voluntary Environmentalists: Green Clubs, ISO 14001, and Voluntary Regulations (Cambridge University Press, 2006, ISBN 978-0-521-86041-3) (with Matthew Potoski)

=== As co-editor ===
- Accountability Clubs: Voluntary Regulation of Nongovernmental and Nonprofit Organizations (Cambridge University Press, 2010) (with Mary Kay Gugerty)
- Advocacy Organizations and Collective Action (Cambridge University Press, 2010) (with Mary Kay Gugerty)
- Voluntary Programs: A Club Theory Perspective (The MIT Press, 2009) (with Matt Potoski)
- Coping with Globalization (Routledge, 2000) (with Jeffrey Hart)
- Responding to Globalization (Routledge, 2000) (with Jeffrey Hart)
- Globalization and Governance (Routledge, 1999) (with Jeffrey Hart)

=== Key journal articles ===
- The Politics of Climate Change Adaptation. Annual Review of Environment and Resources, 2018 (with Nives Dolsak).
- Do Donors Reduce Bilateral Aid to Countries with Restrictive NGO Laws?: A Panel Study, 1993-2012, Nonprofit and Voluntary Sector Quarterly, 2018, 47(1): 89-106 (with Kendra Dupuy).
- Reducing Toxic Chemical Pollution in Response to Multiple Information Signals: The 33/50 Voluntary Program and Toxicity Disclosures. Ecological Economics, 2018, 146: 193-202 (with William McGuire and Phi Cong Hoang).
- How Voluntary Environmental Programs Reduce Pollution. Public Administration Review, 2018, forthcoming (with Phi Cong Hoang and William McGuire).
- Do Government and Foreign Funding influence Individual Donations to Religious Nonprofits?: A Survey Experiment in Pakistan. Nonprofit Policy Forum, 2017, 8(3): 237–273 (with Rafeel Wasif).
- Do Economic Problems at Home Undermine Worker Safety Abroad?: A Panel Study,1980-2009. World Development, 2017, 96 (August): 562–577 (with Sijeong Lim).
- The Shanghai Effect: Do Exports to China Affect Labor Practices in Africa? World Development, 2017(January): 1-18 (with Christopher Adolph and Vanessa Quince).
- Hands Off My Regime! Governments’ Restrictions on Foreign Aid to Nongovernmental Organizations in Poor and Middle-Income Countries. World Development, 2016, 84 (August): 299–311 (with Kendra Dupuy and James Ron).
- Regulation by Reputation: Monitoring and Sanctioning in Nonprofit Accountability Clubs. Public Administration Review, 2016, 76(5): 712-722 (with Joannie Tremblay Boire and Mary Kay Gugerty).
- The EU Effect: Does Trade with the EU Reduce CO2 Emissions in the Developing World? Environmental Politics, 2016, 26(1): 27-48 (with Matthew Potoski).
- “Bluewashing" the Firm?: Voluntary Regulations, Program Design and Member Compliance with the United Nations Global Compact. Policy Studies Journal, 2015, 43(1): 115-138 (with Daniel Berliner).
- Who Survived? Ethiopia’s Regulatory Crackdown on Foreign-Funded NGOs. Review of International Political Economy, 2015, 22(2): 419-456 (with Kendra Dupuy and James Ron).
- Public Authority and Private Rules: How Domestic Regulatory Institutions Shape the Adoption of Global Private Regimes. International Studies Quarterly, (with Daniel Berliner).
- National Styles of NGO Regulation. Nonprofit and Voluntary Sector Quarterly, 2014, 43(4): 43: 716-736 (with Elizabeth Bloodgood and Joannie Tremblay-Boire).
- Voluntary Regulations and Innovation: The Case of ISO 14001. Public Administration Review, 2014, 74(2): 233-244 (with Sijeong Lim).
- NGOization, Foreign Funding, and the Nicaraguan Civil Society. Voluntas, 2014, 25(2): 487–513 (with Dean Chahim).
- Global Private Regimes, Domestic Public Law: ISO 14001 and Pollution Reduction. Comparative Political Studies, 2014, 47(3): 369 - 394 (with Matthew Potoski).
- Economic Development and Gender Equality: Is there a Gender Kuznets Curve? World Politics, 2013, 65(1): 156-184, (with Joshua Eastin).
- Where is the Tipping Point? Bilateral Trade and the Diffusion of Human Rights, 1982-2004. British Journal of Political Science, 2013, 43(1): 133-156 (with Xun Cao and Brian Greenhill).
- From Norms to Programs: The United Nations Global Compact and Global Governance. Regulation & Governance, 2012, 6(2): 149–166 (with Daniel Berliner).
- Voluntary Environmental Programs: A Comparative Perspective. Journal of Policy Analysis and Management, 2011, 31(1)L 123-138 (with Matthew Potoski).
- Charity Watchdogs and the Limits of Information-Based Regulation. Voluntas, 2011, 22(1): 112-141 (with Rebecca Szper).
- The Two Limits Debates: "Limits to Growth" and Climate Change. Futures, 2011, 43(1): 16-26 (with Joshua Eastin and Reiner Grundmann).
- Trade Competition and Domestic Pollution: A Panel Study, 1980-2003.International Organization, 2010 (with Xun Cao)
- Growing Exports by Signaling Product Quality: Trade Competition and the Cross-National Diffusion of ISO 9000 Quality Standards. Journal of Policy Analysis and Management, 2010 (with Xun Cao)
- Trade and Labor Rights: A Panel Study, 1986-2002. American Political Science Review, 2009 (with Brian Greenhill & Layna Mosley)
- Investing Up: FDI and the Cross-National Diffusion of ISO 14001. International Studies Quarterly,2007 (with Matthew Potoski)
- Protecting Jobs in the Age of Globalization: Examining the Relative Salience of Social Welfare and Industrial Subsidies in OECD Countries. International Studies Quarterly, 2007 (with Xun Cao and Michael D. Ward)
- Racing to the Bottom? Globalization, Environmental Governance, and ISO 14001. American Journal of Political Science, 2006 (with Matthew Potoski)
- Green Clubs and Voluntary Governance: ISO 14001 and Firms' Regulatory Compliance. American Journal of Political Science, 2005 (with Matthew Potoski)
- Covenants with Weak Swords: ISO 14001 and Firms' Environmental Performance. Journal of Policy Analysis and Management, 2005 (with Matthew Potoski)
- Using Ideas Strategically: Examining the Contest between Business and NGO Networks in Intellectual Property Rights. International Studies Quarterly, 2004 (with Susan Sell)
- The Regulation Dilemma: Cooperation and Conflict in Environmental Governance. Public Administration Review, 2004 (with Matthew Potoski)
- Green by Choice? Cross-National Variations in Firms' Responses to EMS-based Environmental Regimes. World Politics, 2001 (with Kelly Kollman)
- Responsible Care: An Assessment. Business & Society, 2000.
