= Layna Mosley =

American political scientist

- Education: Rollins College; Duke University
- Scientific career
- Fields: Political science
- Workplaces: University of Notre Dame; University of North Carolina at Chapel Hill; Princeton University

Layna Mosley is an American political scientist. She is a professor of political science in the Department of Politics at Princeton University and the Princeton School of Public and International Affairs. She studies international relations, particularly the relationship between domestic politics and the global economy.

== Education and positions ==
Mosley attended Rollins College, where she graduated with a BA degree in international relations in 1993. She then studied political science at Duke University, where she obtained an MA degree in 1996 and a PhD in 1999.

In 1999, Mosley became the Thomas J. and Robert T. Rolfs Assistant Professor of Political Science at the University of Notre Dame. In 2004, she joined the political science faculty at The University of North Carolina at Chapel Hill. In 2017, Mosley visited the Hertie School on a Fulbright Faculty Fellow Award. In 2020, she became a Professor of Politics and International Affairs at the Princeton University Department of Politics and the Princeton School of Public and International Affairs.

== Research ==
In 2003, Mosley published the book Global Capital and National Governments. In Global Capital and National Governments, Mosley examines the influence of financial markets on the capacity of national governments to implement their preferred policies, in the context of the increasing economic integration of capital markets. Mosley identifies a causal process in which the global financial market sets the price of international borrowing in response to government policy, doing so in a state of information asymmetry, and then governments react to the market's assessment of their policy. This model allows Mosley to study questions like what the policy preferences of foreign investors are and how governments can effectively enact policy in an era when globalization has made capital quite internationally mobile. Mosley also focuses on the variation in how much financial markets can affect policy across different countries, arguing that markets have a narrow but strong influence on the governments of developed economies but a broader and more volatile effect on the governments of emerging markets. This variation can be attributed both to the way that markets react to policies in different countries and to the internal policymaking dynamics of each country; for example, Mosley argues that the details of microeconomic policy in developed economies is too costly for financial markets to take into account, but in emerging markets it is a central concern of theirs. In Global Capital and National Governments, Mosley employs a variety of empirical approaches, including interviews with more than 64 fund managers in New York, London and Frankfurt, as well as archival research, and large quantitative cross-national analyses.

Mosley published the book Labor Rights and Multinational Production in 2011. Using cases across Africa, Latin America, Asia, and the Middle East, Mosley argues that one central determinant of labor rights is a firm's decision to either control production directly or to use subcontractors. Workers' rights are more extensive in cases where firms directly control production, and less extensive in cases where firms rely on subcontractors. Mosley also tests the hypothesis that foreign direct investment has a positive effect on workers' rights, and she finds that it is conditionally true of both foreign direct investment and trade openness. These hypotheses address an open question in the study of labor rights in the context of globalization: whether globalization has initiated a global race to offer better or worse working conditions. Mosley's answer is conditional, since in Labor Rights and Multinational Production she argues that different types of globalization affect workers' rights in different ways. Mosley tests these ideas with a dataset that covers almost 200 countries from 1985 to 2002, containing instances of both practical and legal labor rights violations.

In 2013, Mosley edited the book Interview research in political science. From 2018 to 2019 she was an associate editor of the American Journal of Political Science. Mosley has been interviewed, or her work has been cited, in media outlets including The New York Times, The Washington Post, and PolitiFact. She has also been on the executive committee of Women Also Know Stuff.

In 2009, Mosley won the American Political Science Association's Labor Project Best Paper Award, together with Brian Greenhill and Aseem Prakash, for their paper "Trade and Labor Rights: A Panel Study". The three won the same prize again in 2011 for their paper "Contingent Convergence (or Divergence): Unpacking the Linkages between Labor Rights and Foreign Direct Investment".

== Selected works ==
- "Room to Move: International Financial Markets and National Welfare States", International Organization (2000)
- Global Capital and National Governments (2003)
- "Racing to the Bottom or Climbing to the Top? Economic Globalization and Collective Labor Rights", Comparative Political Studies, with Saika Uno (2007)
- Labor Rights and Multinational Production (2011)
- Interview research in political science, editor (2013)

== Selected awards ==
- Labor Project Best Paper Award, American Political Science Association (2008)
- Labor Project Best Paper Award, American Political Science Association (2011)
