= Myer Rashish =

American economist

9th Under Secretary of State for Economic Affairs
- In office June 29, 1981 – January 20, 1982
- President: Ronald Reagan
- Preceded by: Richard N. Cooper
- Succeeded by: W. Allen Wallis

Personal details
- Born: November 10, 1924; Cambridge, Massachusetts, U.S.
- Died: May 22, 1995 (aged 70); Washington, D.C., U.S.
- Education: Harvard College; Harvard University

Myer Rashish (November 10, 1924 – May 22, 1995) was a Harvard-trained economist who served as United States Under Secretary of State for Economic Affairs from 1981 to 1982.

== Biography ==
Rashish was born in Cambridge, Massachusetts on November 10, 1924. He attended Harvard College, receiving his B.A. in 1944. He then received an M.A. in economics from Harvard University in 1947. Rashish spent the 1940s teaching economics at the Massachusetts Institute of Technology, Williams College, Tufts College, and Bowdoin College.

Rashish moved to Washington, D.C. in 1952. In 1956, he became chief economist and staff director of the Subcommittee on Foreign Trade Policy and the United States House Committee on Ways and Means. In 1960–61, President-elect of the United States John F. Kennedy named Rashish secretary of his Task Force on Foreign Economic Policy and the Task Force on the Balance of Payments. From 1961 to 1963, he was Assistant to the President for International Trade Policy, in which capacity he played a major role in the passage of the Trade Expansion Act of 1962.

Rashish became a private economist in 1963. From 1967 to 1971, he was a consultant to the United States Congress Joint Economic Committee. He later served on the presidentially appointed Advisory Committee for Trade Negotiations and was elected chairman in 1980.

In 1981, President Ronald Reagan nominated Rashish as Under Secretary of State for Economic Affairs and, after Senate confirmation, Rashish held that office from June 29, 1981, until January 20, 1982.

Rashish died of lung cancer at Sibley Memorial Hospital in Washington, D.C. on May 22, 1995, at the age of 70.

Government offices
Preceded by Richard N. Cooper	Under Secretary of State for Economic Affairs; June 29, 1981 – January 20, 1982	Succeeded by W. Allen Wallis
