= Richard N. Cooper =

American economist (1934–2020)

Chair of the National Intelligence Council
- In office June 1, 1995 – January 1997
- President: Bill Clinton
- Preceded by: Christine Williams
- Succeeded by: John C. Gannon

8th Under Secretary of State for Economic Affairs
- In office April 8, 1977 – January 19, 1981
- President: Jimmy Carter
- Preceded by: William D. Rogers
- Succeeded by: Myer Rashish

Acting United States Secretary of State
- In office May 3, 1980 – May 3, 1980
- President: Jimmy Carter
- Preceded by: David D. Newsom
- Succeeded by: David D. Newsom

Personal details
- Born: Richard Newell Cooper; June 14, 1934
- Died: December 23, 2020 (aged 86)
- Education: Oberlin College (BA); London School of Economics (MS); Harvard University (PhD)

Richard Newell Cooper (June 14, 1934 – December 23, 2020) was an American economist, policy adviser, and academic.

== Life and career ==
Born in Seattle, Cooper graduated from Oberlin College in 1956 and received a master's degree in economics from the London School of Economics and Political Science as a Marshall Scholar in 1958. He received his Ph.D. from Harvard University in 1962. Cooper taught international economics at Yale University from 1966 to 1977 and was provost there from 1972 to 1974.

Cooper served on the Council of Economic Advisers from 1961 to 1963 as the senior staff economist. Between 1965 and 1966, he served as Deputy Assistant Secretary of State for International Monetary Affairs in the United States Department of State, and between 1977 and 1981 he was the Under-Secretary of State for Economic Affairs. Cooper briefly served as acting Secretary of State under President Jimmy Carter for a few hours on May 3, 1980.

In 1981, Cooper became Maurits C. Boas Professor of International Economics at Harvard University. From 1990 to 1992, Cooper was the chairman of the Federal Reserve Bank of Boston. Between 1995 and 1997, he was the chairman of the National Intelligence Council.

Political offices
Preceded by William D. Rogers	Under Secretary of State for Economic Affairs; 1977–1981	Succeeded by Myer Rashish
Government offices
Preceded by Christine Williams	Chair of the National Intelligence Council; 1995–1997	Succeeded by John C. Gannon
