= Reuben Jeffery III =

American government official

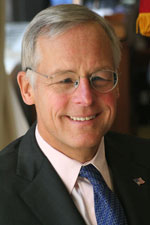
- Jeffery in 2007

Chairperson of the Commodity Futures Trading Commission
- In office July 11, 2005 – June 27, 2007
- President: George W. Bush
- Preceded by: Sharon Brown-Hruska
- Succeeded by: Walter L. Lukken

17th Under Secretary of State for Economic, Business, and Agricultural Affairs
- In office June 27, 2007 – January 20, 2009
- President: George W. Bush
- Preceded by: Josette Sheeran
- Succeeded by: Robert D. Hormats

Personal details
- Born: August 21, 1953 (age 73) Wilmington, Delaware
- Education: Yale University (BA); Stanford University (JD/MBA)
- Known for: Diplomat

Reuben Jeffery III (born August 21, 1953) is the former United States Under Secretary of State for Economic, Business, and Agricultural Affairs, having been appointed to that position by United States President George W. Bush in June 2007. Presently, Reuben Jeffery III is the president, chief executive officer and member of the board of Rockefeller & Co. and Rockefeller Financial Services, Inc. He is a member of the International Advisory Committee of J. Rothschild Capital Management Limited.

== Early life ==
Reuben Jeffery III was born on August 21, 1953.

Jeffery attended Yale University, receiving a Bachelor of Arts in Political Science in 1975. Upon graduation, he joined the management program at Morgan Guaranty Trust Company in New York City. He then moved to Stanford University, where he received both a Master of Business Administration and a Juris Doctor in 1981 (as part of the joint program between the Stanford Graduate School of Business and Stanford Law School).

== Career ==
Jeffery initially accepted an offer from Davis Polk & Wardwell, before moving on to Goldman Sachs in 1983. He became Managing Partner of Goldman Sachs's European Financial Institutions Group in London in 1992, and then Managing Partner of the Goldman Sachs Paris office in 1997.

Jeffery supported the candidacy of George W. Bush in the 2000 presidential election. In the wake of 9/11, President Bush appointed Jeffery as his Special Advisor on Lower Manhattan Development, and in 2002, Jeffery left Goldman Sachs to take on this responsibility. In 2003, Jeffery became a Special Advisor to L. Paul Bremer, head of the Coalition Provisional Authority in Iraq and then became the representative and executive director of the Coalition Provisional Authority Office in The Pentagon.

He served as a member of the United States National Security Council until 2005, as a Senior Director responsible for International Economic Affairs. Currently he sits in the board of directors of Barclays.

In 2005, Jeffery was named the chairman of the Commodity Futures Trading Commission.

President Bush nominated Jeffery as Under Secretary of State for Economic, Business, and Agricultural Affairs on April 16, 2007 and he was confirmed by the United States Senate on June 21, 2007. He was sworn in by United States Secretary of State Condoleezza Rice on June 27, 2007.

From 2010 to 2018 Jeffery served as president and CEO of Rockefeller & Co., a NYC-based asset management firm.

On May 8, 2012, Jeffery was reported donating $32,000 to Romney Victory Inc.

In 2013, Jeffery was a signatory to an amicus curiae brief submitted to the Supreme Court in support of same-sex marriage during the Hollingsworth v. Perry case.

Currently Reuben Jeffery III serves as senior advisor at CSIS (Center for Strategic and International Studies) and sits on the board of the American Council of Trustees and Alumni.

== Personal life ==
He is married to Robin Jeffery. They have three children.

Government offices
Preceded by Josette Sheeran	Under Secretary of State for Economic, Business, and Agricultural Affairs; June 27, 2007 – January 20, 2009	Succeeded by Robert Hormats
