= Joan E. Spero =

American diplomat

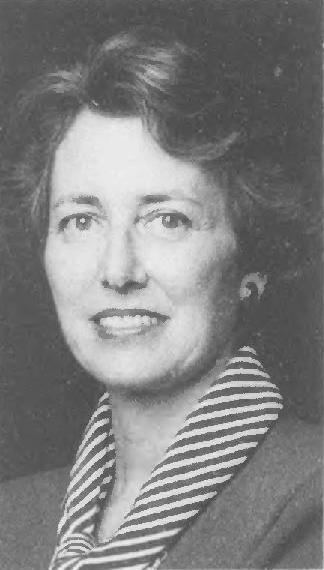

13th Under Secretary for Economic, Business, and Agricultural Affairs
- In office April 1, 1993 – February 24, 1997
- President: Bill Clinton
- Preceded by: Robert Zoellick
- Succeeded by: Stuart E. Eizenstat

Personal details
- Born: October 2, 1944 (age 82) Davenport, Iowa, U.S.
- Education: University of Wisconsin; Columbia University
- Occupation: Academic, corporate executive

Joan Edelman Spero (born October 2, 1944) is a senior research scholar at Columbia University's School of International and Public Affairs, where she researches and writes about international philanthropy and its role in the global system. From 2009 to 2010, Spero was a visiting scholar at the Foundation Center, where she conducted research on the role of American private foundations in U.S. foreign policy and in the global system.

Spero was born in Davenport, Iowa.

== Education and career ==
Spero graduated Phi Beta Kappa from the University of Wisconsin and holds a master's degree in international affairs and a doctorate in political science from Columbia University. She also studied at the Institut d'Études Politiques in Paris and is fluent in French.

=== Government positions ===
Spero was Ambassador to the United Nations for Economic and Social Affairs from 1980 to 1981. From 1993 to 1997, Spero served in the U.S. Department of State as Undersecretary for Economic, Business, and Agricultural Affairs.

=== Corporate and academic roles ===
Spero was an assistant professor at Columbia University from 1973 to 1979. From 1981 to 1993, she held several positions at American Express Company, the last being executive vice president, corporate affairs and communications. From 1997 to 2008, Spero served as President of the Doris Duke Charitable Foundation.

Known as an international political economist, her book The Politics of International Economic Relations, first published in 1977, is currently in its 7th edition and has been translated into numerous languages. She is also the author of The Failure of the Franklin National Bank, originally published in 1980 and reprinted in 1999, as well as New World, New Deal: A Democratic Approach to Globalization (2000), The Global Role of U.S. Foundations (2010) and Charity and Philanthropy in Russia, China, India, and Brazil (2014).

== Organizations ==
Spero is a member of the Academy of Diplomacy, the American Philosophical Society, and the Council of American Ambassadors. Spero serves as a member of the Advisory Board of the Genesis Prize Foundation. She serves as a trustee of the Wisconsin Alumni Research Foundation and the International Center for Transitional Justice and is a trustee emeritus of Columbia University, Amherst College, the Council on Foreign Relations, and the Brookings Institution. Spero is a director of IBM, International Paper and Citigroup and has previously served as a director of ING, FDC, Delta Air Lines, and Hercules.

== Publications ==
- The Politics of International Economic Relations, 1st edition (New York: St. Martin's Press, 1977)
- The Failure of the Franklin National Bank: Challenge to the International Banking System (1980, reprinted 1999)
- The Politics of International Economic Relations, 2nd edition (New York: St. Martin's Press, 1981)
- The Politics of International Economic Relations, 3rd edition (New York: St. Martin's Press, 1985)
- The Politics of International Economic Relations, 4th edition (New York: St. Martin's Press, 1990)
- The Politics of International Economic Relations (with Jeffrey A. Hart), 5th edition (New York: Bedford/St. Martin's Press, 1997)
- New World, New Deal: A Democratic Approach to Globalization (with W. Bowman Cutter and Laura D'Andrea Tyson) (Foreign Affairs, 2000)
- The Politics of International Economic Relations (with Jeffrey A. Hart), 6th edition (Belmont, California: Thomson/Wadsworth, 2003)
- The Politics of International Economic Relations (with Jeffrey A. Hart), 7th edition (Boston: Cengage, 2010)
- The Global Role of U.S. Foundations (The Foundation Center, 2010)
- Charity and Philanthropy in Russia, China, India, and Brazil (The Foundation Center and WINGS, 2014)

Government offices
Preceded by Robert Zoellick	Under Secretary of State for Economic, Business, and Agricultural Affairs; April 1, 1993 – February 24, 1997	Succeeded by Stuart E. Eizenstat
