= David Huitema =

American attorney and government official

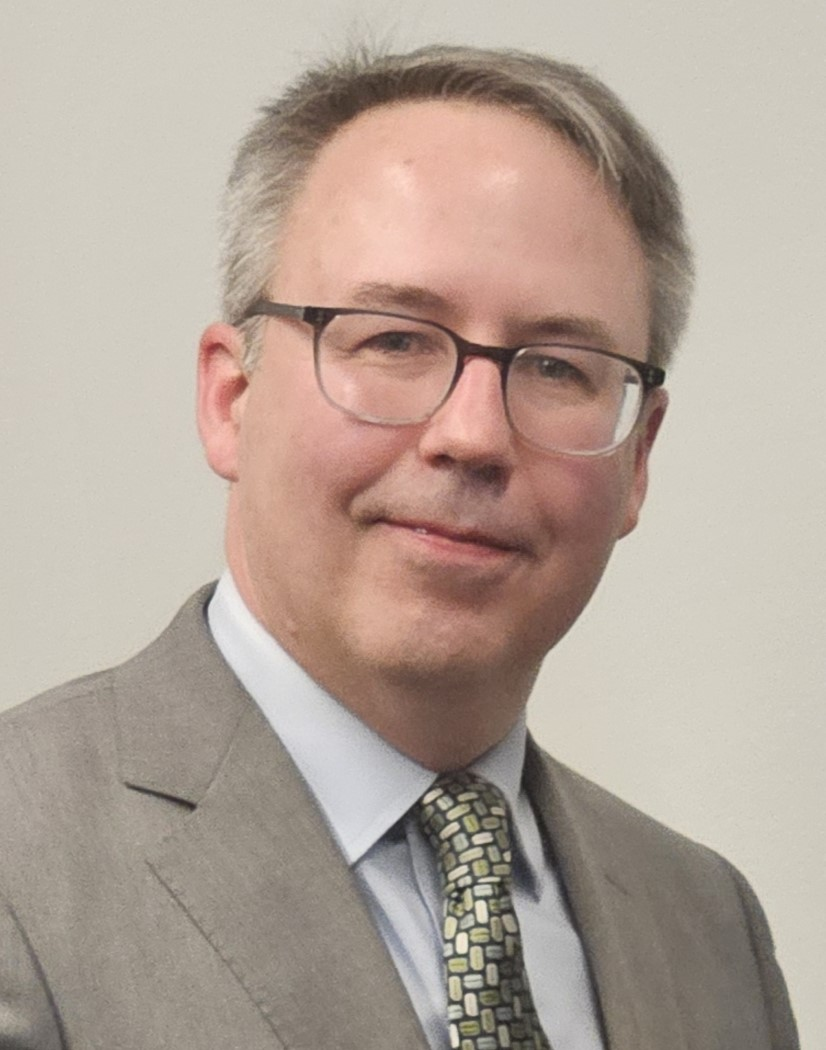

Director of the United States Office of Government Ethics
- In office December 16, 2024 – February 10, 2025
- President: Joe Biden; Donald Trump
- Preceded by: Emory Rounds
- Succeeded by: Shelley Finlayson (acting)

Personal details
- Born: David Patrick Huitema; 1971 (age 54–55) Washington, DC, U.S.
- Education: University of North Carolina, Chapel Hill (BA); University of Texas, Austin (MA); Stanford University (JD)

David Patrick Huitema is an American attorney and government ethics official who served as Director of the United States Office of Government Ethics from December 2024 until February 2025.

He was nominated by President Joe Biden to serve a five-year term and was confirmed by the Senate in November 2024. However, on February 10, 2025, he was dismissed by President Donald Trump as part of a purge of inspector generals and other government officials who investigate public corruption.

== Early life and education ==
Huitema was born in 1971 to Jim and Mollie Huitema. Both of his parents had careers in public service with his mother working as a teacher and his father working for the federal government. Huitema earned a bachelor's degree from the University of North Carolina at Chapel Hill, master's degree from the University of Texas at Austin, and a Juris Doctor from Stanford Law School.

== Career ==
In 1999 Huitema served as a clerk with the United States Court of Appeals for the Eleventh Circuit under Judge Phyllis Kravitch before entering private legal practice. In 2006 he joined the Office of the Legal Advisor at the U.S. Department of State. Within this office has advised several State Department bureaus on a wide range of legal issues. From 2016 until 2024 he served at the Department of State as both the Assistant Legal Advisor for Ethics and Financial Disclosure and the Alternate Designated Agency Ethics Official (ADAEO).

On September 5, 2023, his nomination by President Joe Biden to be the Director of the United States Office of Government Ethics was formally submitted to the senate for confirmation.

On November 14, 2024, Huitema was confirmed by the United States Senate by a 50–46 vote split along party-lines, no Republicans voted for Huitema. On December 16, 2024, Huitema was sworn in as Director of the United States Office of Government Ethics. On February 10, 2025, Huitema was fired by President Donald Trump.

== Personal life ==
Huitema and his wife, Carolyn, have two sons and reside in Chevy Chase, Maryland.

Political offices
Preceded by Shelley Finlayson; Acting	Director of the United States Office of Government Ethics; 2024–2025	Succeeded by Shelley Finlayson; Acting
