= United States Office of Government Ethics =

Independent agency

Agency overview
- Formed: Ethics in Government Act October 26, 1978; 47 years ago
- Annual budget: 23,037,000 USD
- Agency executive: Keith Sonderling, Acting Director
- Website: www.oge.gov

The United States Office of Government Ethics (OGE) is an independent agency within the executive branch of the U.S. federal government which is responsible for directing executive branch policies relating to the prevention of conflicts of interest on the part of Federal executive branch officers and employees. Under the Ethics in Government Act, this agency was originally part of the Office of Personnel Management from 1978 until it separated in 1989.

== Primary duties ==
The main duties of OGE include the following:

- Establishing the standards of conduct for the executive branch;
- Issuing rules and regulations interpreting the criminal conflict of interest restrictions;
- Establishing the framework for the public and confidential financial disclosure systems for executive branch employees;
- Developing training and education programs for use by executive branch ethics officials and employees;
- Ensuring that individual agency ethics programs are functioning properly by setting the requirements for them, supporting them, and reviewing them.

== History ==
Congress first addressed concerns with government ethics in 1853. Congress passed a law, entitled "An Act to prevent Frauds upon the Treasury of the United States," that made it a misdemeanor for "any officer of the United States" or "any Senator or Representative in Congress" to assist in or prosecute "any claim against the United States."

Ethics concerns continued during the Civil War. Theodore Roosevelt, prior to becoming the vice president, served as United States Civil Service Commissioner under President Benjamin Harrison. Roosevelt drew on this experience to help create the modern merit system (now exemplified by the United States Merit Systems Protection Board) for federal employees during his presidency. This, in turn, led to further developments, including the focus on ethics in Franklin Delano Roosevelt's 1933 inaugural speech.

Following Watergate, Congress passed the Ethics in Government Act of 1978 as an attempt to curb the ongoing government ethics concerns.

== Office of Director ==
The Director of OGE is appointed by the President after confirmation by the U.S. Senate. The director serves a five-year term, thereby overlapping presidential terms, and is not subject to term limits. The rest of the OGE employees are career civil servants. Created by the Ethics in Government Act of 1978, OGE separated from the U.S. Office of Personnel Management in 1989 pursuant to reform legislation.

David Huitema was the last director of the OGE, having been sworn into office on December 16, 2024. He was removed by Donald Trump on February 10, 2025.

== Issues involving President Trump ==
A series of tweets on 30 November 2016 from the office's official Twitter account praised President-elect Donald Trump for planning to divest his business holdings in order to resolve potential conflicts of interest, following an announcement where Trump reaffirmed his intent to take himself out of business operations, despite having made no firm commitment to a divestment like selling his businesses or a blind trust. A number of observers speculated that the office's account might have been hacked, a suggestion it later denied. The New York Times suggested that the apparent misunderstanding behind the postings were deliberately intended to reveal the independent agency had advised Trump's legal counsel that a divestment was the only adequate remedy for resolving any conflict, and, by extension, pressure Trump into doing so. A Freedom of Information Act request by news organization The Daily Dot revealed that OGE director Walter M. Shaub personally ordered officials within the agency to post the nine tweets.

Under the Trump administration, the Office reversed its own internal policy prohibiting anonymous donations from lobbyists to White House staffers who have legal defense funds.

=== OGE certification of ethics agreement compliance form ===
On May 11, 2017, the Office of Government Ethics requested the Trump administration and its associates submit a form regarding divestment of assets and possible conflicts of interest.

== List of directors of the OGE ==
- J. Jackson Walter, 1979–1982
- David H. Martin, 1983–1987
- Frank Q. Nebeker, 1987–1989
- Stephen D. Potts, 1990–2000
- Amy Comstock, 2000–2003
- Robert Cusick, 2006−2011
- Walter Shaub, January 9, 2013 – July 19, 2017
- David J. Apol, July 20, 2017 – July 13, 2018 (acting)
- Emory A. Rounds III, July 13, 2018 – July 3, 2023
- Shelley Finlayson, July 3, 2023 – December 16, 2024 (acting)
- David Huitema, December 16, 2024 – February 10, 2025
- Shelley Finlayson, February 10, 2025 – February 12, 2025 (acting)
- Doug Collins, February 12, 2025 – April 1, 2025 (acting)
- Jamieson Greer, April 1, 2025 – August 26, 2025 (acting)
- Eric Ueland, August 26, 2025 – December 2025 (acting)
- Keith Sonderling, June 23, 2026 – Present (acting)

== See also ==
- Title 5 of the Code of Federal Regulations
- Florida Commission on Ethics
