= Catherine A. Novelli =

American diplomat

Catherine Ann Novelli
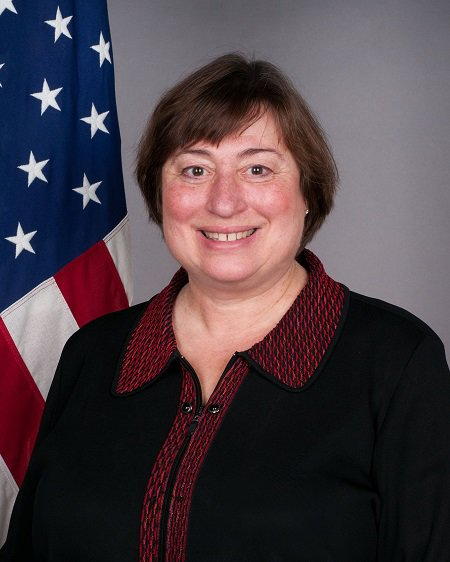

19th Under Secretary of State for Economic Growth, Energy, and the Environment
- In office April 22, 2014 – January 20, 2017
- President: Barack Obama
- Preceded by: Robert Hormats
- Succeeded by: Keith J. Krach

Personal details
- Born: 1957 (age 68–69)
- Spouse: David J. Apol
- Education: Tufts University (BA); University of Michigan (JD); University of London (LLM)

Catherine Ann Novelli (born 1957) is president of Listening for America, a non-profit organization in international trade policy. She was formerly a U.S. diplomat who served as Under Secretary of State for Economic Growth, Energy, and the Environment at the U.S. Department of State from 2014 to 2017. She was also the State Department's Senior Coordinator for International Information Technology Diplomacy.

== Early life and education ==
Novelli is a graduate of Tufts University, holds a Juris Doctor degree from the University of Michigan and a Master of Laws from the University of London (with concentrations in international and comparative law at the London School of Economics and School of Oriental and Asian Studies).

== Career ==
Novelli served as Assistant U.S. Trade Representative for Europe and the Mediterranean from 1991 to 2005. She then served as vice-president of Worldwide Government Affairs at Apple, Inc. from 2005 to 2013.

President Barack Obama nominated Novelli as Under Secretary for Economic Growth, Energy, and the Environment on September 24, 2013. Novelli was sworn in on February 18, 2014.

In 2015, President Obama unsuccessfully nominated Novelli to be United States Alternate Governor of the European Bank for Reconstruction and Development. Her nomination expired upon the swearing in of a new Congress in January 2017.

== Personal life ==
Novelli is married to David J. Apol, who is the acting Director of the United States Office of Government Ethics. They met in law school and have two children, Katie and Daniel Apol.

Political offices
Preceded by Robert Hormats	Under Secretary of State for Economic Growth, Energy, and the Environment; 2014–2017	Succeeded by Keith J. Krach
