= Richard T. McCormack =

American government official

- Born: Richard Thomas Fox McCormack; Bradford, Pennsylvania, U.S.
- Education: Georgetown University (BA); University of Fribourg (PhD, magna cum laude)
- Spouse: Karen Louise Hagstrom
- Children: 3
- Awards: State Department Distinguished Service Award; State Department Superior Honor Award; French Legion of Honor

Richard T. McCormack

11th Under Secretary of State for Economic and Agricultural Affairs
- In office April 14, 1989 – May 3, 1991
- Preceded by: W. Allen Wallis
- Succeeded by: Robert Zoellick

16th Assistant Secretary of State for Economic and Business Affairs
- In office 1983–1985
- Preceded by: Robert Hormats
- Succeeded by: Douglas W. McMinn

11th United States Ambassador to the Organization of American States
- In office 1985–1989
- Preceded by: J. William Middendorf
- Succeeded by: Luigi R. Einaudi

Richard T. McCormack is an American government official and diplomat. He has served nearly five decades advising policymakers on foreign affairs and global economic developments. He is currently a senior advisor for CSIS (Center for Strategic and International Studies) in Washington, D.C.

== Career ==
After receiving his PhD, Richard McCormack was recruited by the House Republican Conference for special projects and to help coordinate the summer intern program. Subsequently, he joined the Peace Corps staff, where he helped lead a project to build 1,000 Peace Corps schools in the third world. In 1967, Arlen Specter’s mayoralty campaign recruited McCormack to draft a major paper on proposals for improving race relations in Philadelphia.

Following the campaign, McCormack was hired as head of operations research for Philco-Ford in their Southeast Asia headquarters in Saigon, Vietnam. Later, he was recruited by the Nixon presidential campaign to work on foreign affairs related issues, including Vietnam. Following the presidential election, McCormack served at the White House as a senior staff member on the President’s Advisory Council on Executive Organization (Ash Council), where he had lead responsibilities for designing the plans for the Council on International Economic Policy. Later, McCormack worked as assistant to Governor William Scranton on the President’s Commission on Campus Unrest to address the Vietnam War and race-related violence on campuses. After the resignation of President Nixon, McCormack served in the Treasury Department as Deputy to the Assistant Secretary for International Affairs and later as a consultant advisor to Ambassador Harald B. Malmgren at the White House Office of the Special Trade Representative on a major commodity policy initiative.

Beginning in 1975, McCormack became consultant to the president of the American Enterprise Institute (AEI). At AEI, he wrote numerous speeches and papers on foreign and economic policies for federal officials. From 1979 to 1981, McCormack worked as a foreign policy advisor for U.S. Senator Jesse Helms

After the election of Ronald Reagan in 1981, McCormack was named the Assistant Secretary of State for Economic and Business Affairs. He was confirmed unanimously by the Senate. In 1985, McCormack was appointed the U.S. Ambassador to the Organization of American States (OAS). While ambassador, in 1986, the State Department published McCormack’s presentation, "Obstacles to Investment and Economic Growth in Latin America," which proposed an interrelated macroeconomic, trade policy, and investment policy initiative. His proposed policy package was implemented and later called "The Washington Consensus." For his outstanding sustained performance as the U.S. Ambassador to the OAS, McCormack was awarded the State Department’s Superior Honor Award.

In 1989, newly elected president George H. W. Bush named McCormack to be the Under Secretary of State for Economic and Agricultural Affairs. In this position, he served as the President’s Sherpa to help coordinate the President’s involvement in two G7 economic summits. He also helped chair the Structural Impediments Initiative, a major negotiation between the U.S. and Japan dealing with trade inequities. For his contributions at the State Department, he was awarded the State Department’s highest award, the Secretary’s Distinguished Service Award, from Secretary of State James A. Baker III. McCormack also received the French Legion of Honor.

After ten years in the State Department, McCormack became a visiting scholar at the Woodrow Wilson Center in Washington. While there, he published a major paper on the Japanese financial crisis and delivered several papers on reforms for the Israeli economy. Subsequently, he served as a consultant to a number of American companies and to the managing director of the IMF, Horst Koehler. In 2004, McCormack joined the Center for Strategic and International Studies (CSIS) as a senior economic advisor and published several papers on a variety of economic issues, including concerns about a developing housing bubble, related derivative issues, and monetary policy concerns. After testifying in May 2006 before the Senate Banking Committee on potential problems associated with derivatives and related issues, McCormack was recruited by Merrill Lynch as a Vice Chairman. Two years later, he was promoted to Executive Vice Chairman of Bank of America, which merged with Merrill Lynch. At Bank of America, he advised the CEO and briefed hundreds of the bank’s clients throughout the world on evolving macroeconomic developments and related issues. He also regularly briefed the bank’s risk committee.

In 2012, he resigned from Bank of America and returned to CSIS to continue his research on the global financial issues.

Ambassador McCormack is an active member of the Council on Foreign Relations, the Economic Club of New York, The Union League Club of New York, the Council of American Ambassadors, and other organizations. His numerous publications include A Conversation with Ambassador Richard T. McCormack, a detailed account of his many years of service in the public and private sectors.

== Early life and education ==
McCormack was born on March 6, 1941, in Bradford, Pennsylvania. After graduating from high school, McCormack attended Georgetown University where he earned his B.A. and then attended the University of Fribourg in Switzerland, where he received his PhD magna cum laude in 1966.

Diplomatic posts
| Preceded by J. William Middendorf | United States Ambassador to the Organization of American States; 1985–1989 | Succeeded by Luigi R. Einaudi |
Government offices
| Preceded by Robert David Hormats | Assistant Secretary of State for Economic and Business Affairs; 1983–1985 | Succeeded by Douglas W. McMinn |
| Preceded by W. Allen Wallis | Under Secretary of State for Economic, Business, and Agricultural Affairs; 1989–1991 | Succeeded by Robert Zoellick |
