= Jeffrey A. Hart =

American political scientist

- Jeffrey A. Hart
- Born: Jeffrey Allen Hart; December 29, 1947 (age 78); New Kensington, Pennsylvania, U.S.
- Education: Swarthmore College (BA); University of California, Berkeley (PhD)
- Occupation: Political scientist
- Known for: International Political Economy
- Spouse: Joan Goldhammer Hart
- Parent(s): Edwin Hart, Enez Hart
- Website: hartj.pages.iu.edu/index.htm

Jeffrey A. Hart (born December 29, 1947) is an American political scientist. He is an emeritus professor of political science at Indiana University, Bloomington, whose research deals mainly with international politics and international political economy. His more recent work deals with the politics of competition in high-technology industries.

== Early life and career ==
He was born in New Kensington, Pennsylvania, where he attended public schools.

From 1965 to 1969, he attended Swarthmore College, where he majored in political science and mathematics. He received his Ph.D. in political science from the University of California, Berkeley, in 1975. His doctoral dissertation was entitled "Graph Theoretical Models of International Relations".

His first teaching position was at Princeton University, where he taught from 1973 until 1980.

From 1980 to 1981, he was a professional staff member of the President's Commission for a National Agenda for the Eighties, located in Washington, D.C., and serving under President Jimmy Carter.

Hart joined the faculty of Indiana University, Department of Political Science, in 1981.

Most of his research over decades has been on the politics of international economic competitiveness in the advanced industrial nations. Between 1996 and 2001, he collaborated with Stefanie Lenway and Tom Murtha at the University of Minnesota on the world flat panel display industry. This research was supported by a grant from the Alfred P. Sloan Foundation. In 2001, he completed a project on globalization in collaboration with Aseem Prakash that resulted in the publication of three edited volumes. In 2004, he published a book on the politics of high-definition television (HDTV).

== Publications ==
- The Anglo-Icelandic Cod War of 1972-1973 : a case study of a fishery dispute (Berkeley : Institute of International Studies, University of California, 1976) ISBN 978-0-87725-129-3
- The New International Economic Order (New York: St. Martin's Press, 1983)
- Interdependence in the Post-Multilateral Era (New York: Rowman and Littlefield, 1986)
- International Trade and U.S. Competitiveness in Services (with Jeanne Schaaf) (National Academies, Papers commissioned by the Panel on Technology and Employment, 1987)
- Rival Capitalists (Ithaca, N.Y.: Cornell University Press, 1993)
- Globalization and Governance (edited with Aseem Prakash) (New York: Routledge, 1999)
- Coping with Globalization (edited with Aseem Prakash) (New York: Routledge, 2000)
- Responding to globalization (edited with Aseem Prakash) (New York: Routledge, 2000)
- Managing New Industry Creation: Global Knowledge Formation and Entrepreneurship in High Technology (with Thomas P. Murtha and Stefanie A. Lenway) (Stanford, Calif.: Stanford University Press, 2001).
- Television, technology, and competition : HDTV and digital TV in the United States, Western Europe, and Japan (New York : Cambridge University Press, 2004). ISBN 0-521-82624-1
- The Politics of International Economic Relations (with Joan Edelman Spero) (Boston: Cengage, 2010).
