= W. Allen Wallis =

American economist (1912–1998)

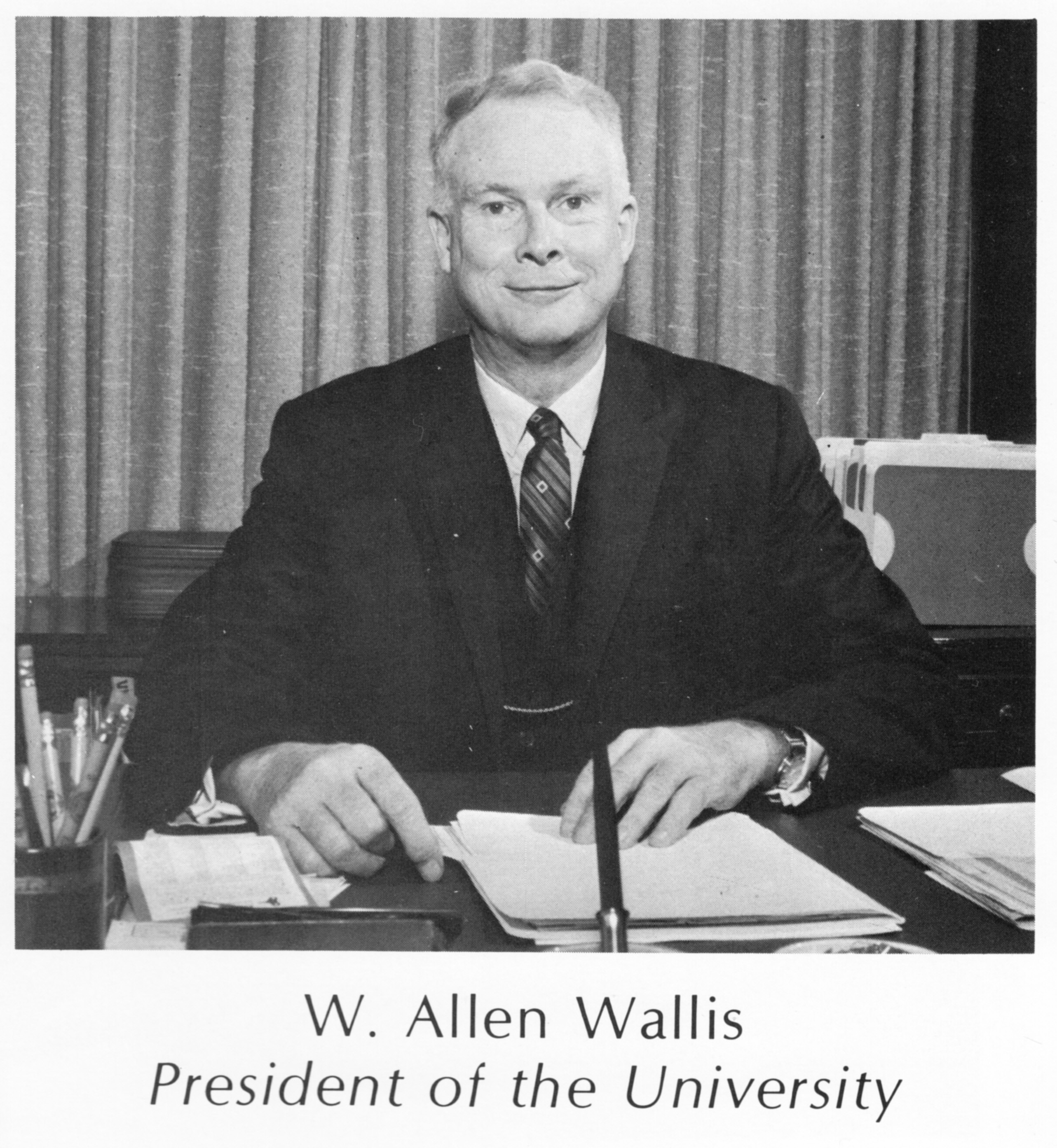

2nd Chancellor of the University of Rochester
- In office 1970–1982
- Preceded by: Ira Harris

1st CEO of the University of Rochester
- In office 1970–1975
- Succeeded by: Robert L. Sproull

6th President of the University of Rochester
- In office 1962–1970
- Preceded by: Cornelis W. de Kiewiet
- Succeeded by: Robert L. Sproull

10th Under Secretary of State for Economic and Agricultural Affairs
- In office September 23, 1982 – January 20, 1989
- Preceded by: Myer Rashish
- Succeeded by: Richard T. McCormack

Personal details
- Born: November 5, 1912 Philadelphia, Pennsylvania, U.S.
- Died: October 12, 1998 (aged 85) Rochester, New York, U.S.
- Party: Independent (until 1984) Republican (1984–1998)
- Spouse: Anne Armstrong
- Children: Nancy Wallis Ingling; Virginia Wallis Cates
- Parent(s): Wilson Dallam Wallis, Grace Steele Allen
- Education: University of Minnesota; University of Chicago
- Profession: Administrator

Wilson Allen Wallis (November 5, 1912 – October 12, 1998) was an American economist and statistician who served as president of the University of Rochester. He is best known for the Kruskal–Wallis one-way analysis of variance, which is named after him and William Kruskal.

== Early years ==
Born in Philadelphia, he attended the University of Minnesota, Class of 1932, where he was a member of Chi Phi fraternity. After receiving his degree in psychology and a year of graduate work at the University of Minnesota, he began graduate studies in economics at The University of Chicago in 1933, where he began what would prove to be lifelong friendships with Milton Friedman, Aaron Director and George Stigler.

In 1936–37, he served as an economist and statistician for the National Resources Committee. During World War II, Wallis was the director of research of the U.S. Office of Scientific Research and Development's Statistical Research Group (1942–46) at Columbia University; he recruited a team of bright young economists, including Friedman and Stigler, to the Statistical Research Group.

From 1948 to 1954, Wallis served as the treasurer of the Mont Pèlerin Society.

== University administration ==
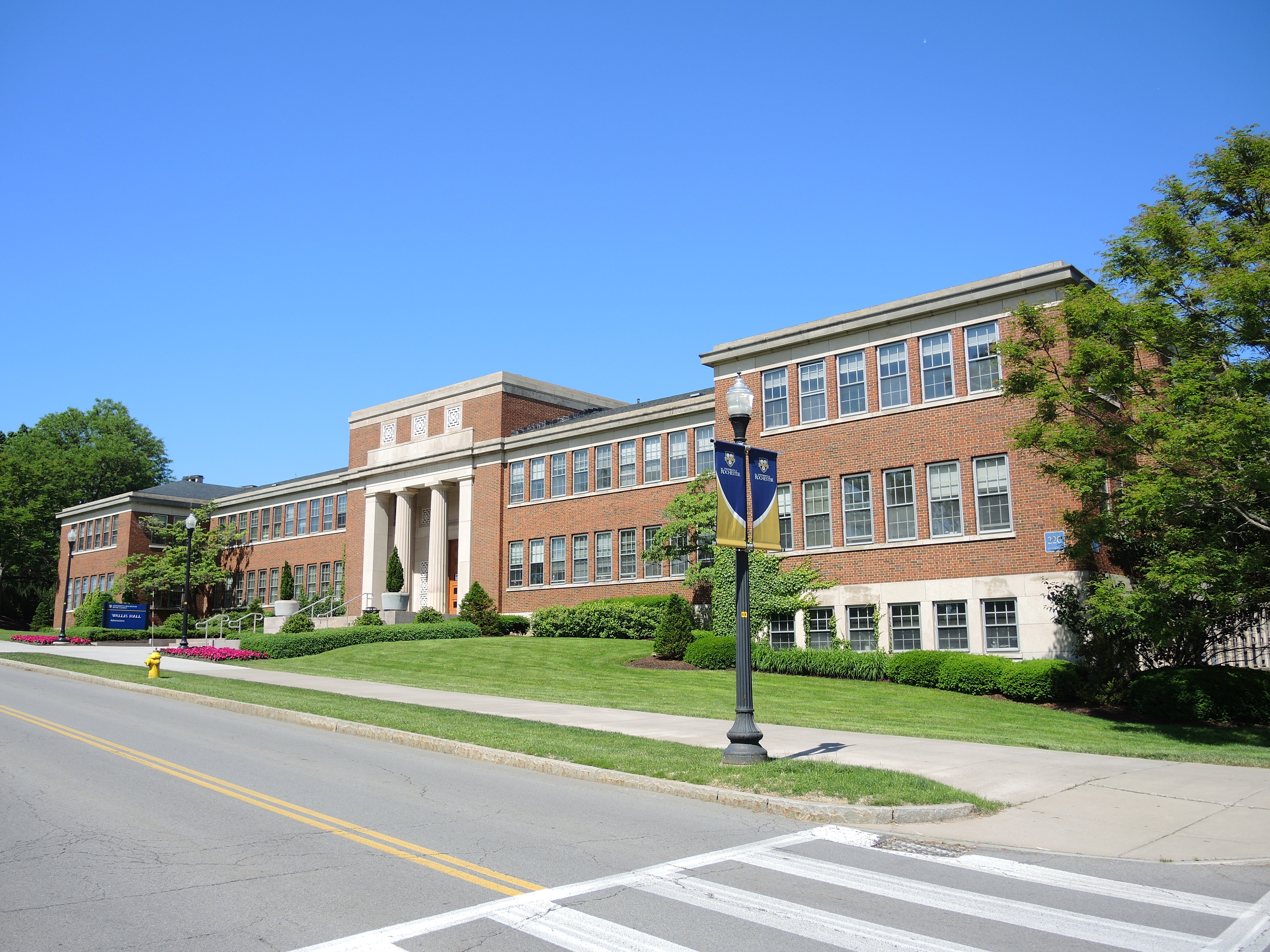
Wallis Hall on the University of Rochester campus

Wallis served as dean of The University of Chicago Graduate School of Business from 1956 to 1962. During his time as dean he established the "Chicago Approach to Business Education," which involved the application of statistical methodology to business.

He became president of the University of Rochester in 1962, a position he held until 1970, when he became the University of Rochester's chancellor and chief executive. In 1975, he relinquished the job of chief executive, but remained chancellor of the university until his retirement in 1982.

In December 1992, the University of Rochester named a joint program of its Departments of Economics and Political Science in honor of Wallis: the W. Allen Wallis Institute of Political Economy at the University of Rochester. He died in 1998 in Rochester, New York.

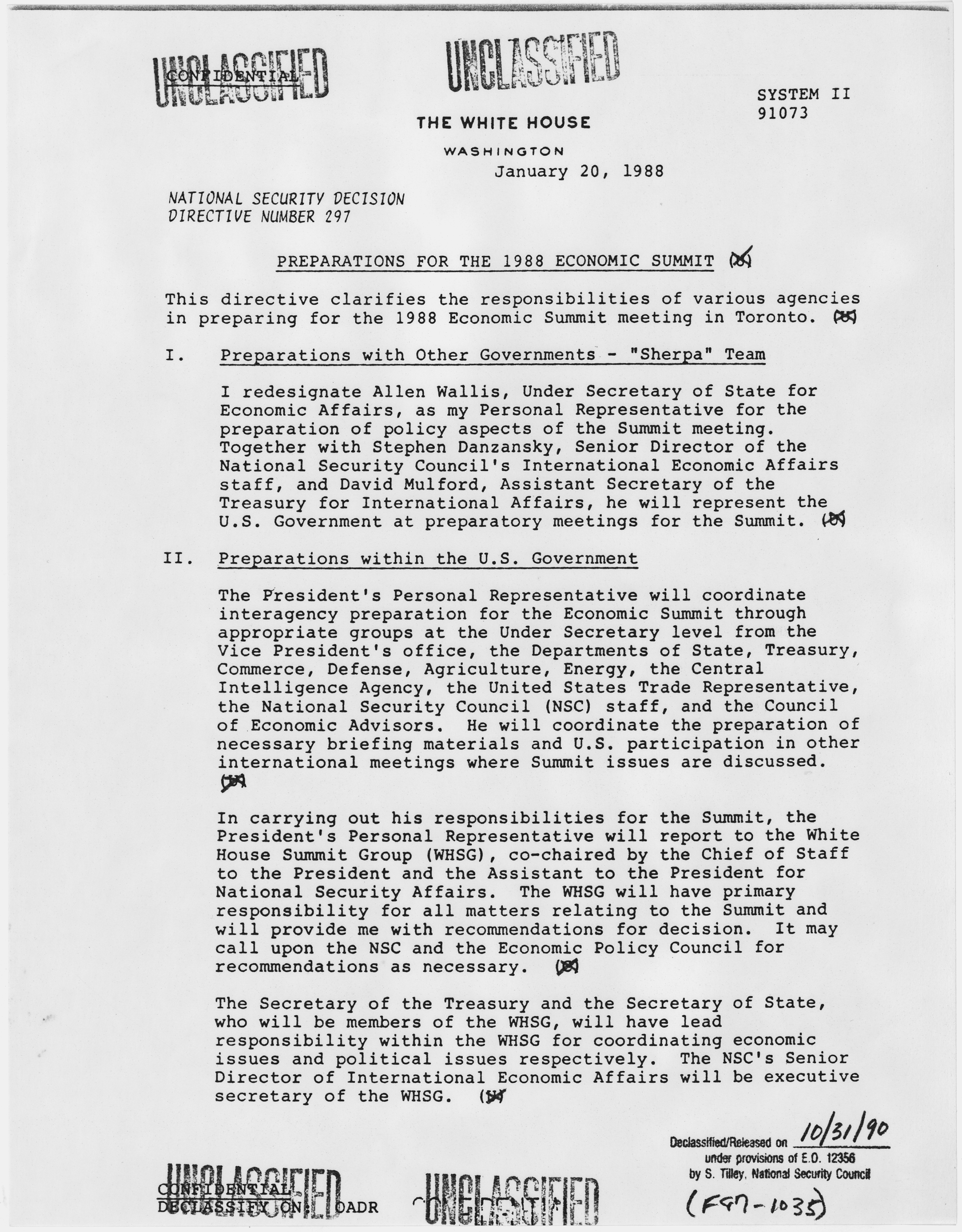
January 1988 memo identifying Wallis as President Reagan's "personal representative" for policy matters during the administration's preparations for attending the 14th G7 summit in June.

== Presidential advisor ==
In addition to his role as an academic and academic administrator, Wallis served as an advisor to U.S. presidents Dwight Eisenhower, Richard Nixon, Gerald Ford, and Ronald Reagan. Under Eisenhower, he collaborated with Vice President Nixon on the report of the Cabinet Committee on Price Stability for Economic Growth (1959–61). Under Nixon and Ford, he served on the President's Commission on Federal Statistics and on the Advisory Council on Social Security. Nixon also appointed Wallis as chairman of the Corporation for Public Broadcasting, a post he held 1975–78. Under Reagan, he served as Under Secretary of State for Economic Affairs (1982–85), and then, after Congress changed the job description and title, as Under Secretary of State for Economic, Business, and Agricultural Affairs (1985–89).

== Selected works ==
- Wallis, W. Allen; Moore, Geoffrey H. (1941), A Significance Test for Time Series and Other Ordered Observations., New York: National Bureau of Economic Research, OCLC 1876032
- Wallis, W. Allen; Churchill Eisenhart; Millard W Hastay (1947), Selected Techniques of Statistical Analysis for Scientific and Industrial Research and Production and Management Engineering, New York: McGraw-Hill, OCLC 490341075
- Wallis, W. Allen; Harry V. Roberts (1956), Statistics, a New Approach, Glencoe, Illinois: Free Press, OCLC 839651
- Wallis, W. Allen; James Tobin (1968), Welfare Programs: An Economic Appraisal, Washington, D.C.: American Enterprise Institute for Public Policy Research, OCLC 21672
- Wallis, W. Allen (1969), "Abolish the Draft", Science, 163 (3864), Washington, D.C.: National Council to Repeal the Draft: 235, Bibcode:1969Sci...163..235W, doi:10.1126/science.163.3864.235, OCLC 45712869, PMID 17790247
- Wallis, W. Allen (1976), An Overgoverned Society, New York: Free Press, ISBN 978-0-02-933710-3, OCLC 2352513

== See also ==
- Kruskal–Wallis one-way analysis of variance

Academic offices
Preceded by John E. Jeuck	Dean of the University of Chicago School of Business; 1956–1962	Succeeded by George P. Shultz
Preceded by Cornelis W. de Kiewiet	President of the University of Rochester; 1962–1970	Succeeded by Robert L. Sproull
Vacant	Chancellor of the University of Rochester; 1970–1982	Vacant
Non-profit organization positions
Preceded by Albert H. Bowker	President of the American Statistical Association; 1965	Succeeded by Frederick F. Stephan
Preceded by Robert S. Benjamin	Chairman of the Corporation for Public Broadcasting; 1975–1978	Succeeded by
Government offices
Preceded by Myer Rashish	Under Secretary of State for Economic Affairs; September 23, 1982 – August 15, 1985	Office renamed
New office	Under Secretary of State for Economic, Business, and Agricultural Affairs; August 16, 1985 – January 20, 1989	Succeeded by Richard T. McCormack
