= Robert Sproull =

American educator, physicist and US Department of Defense official

Robert Lamb Sproull
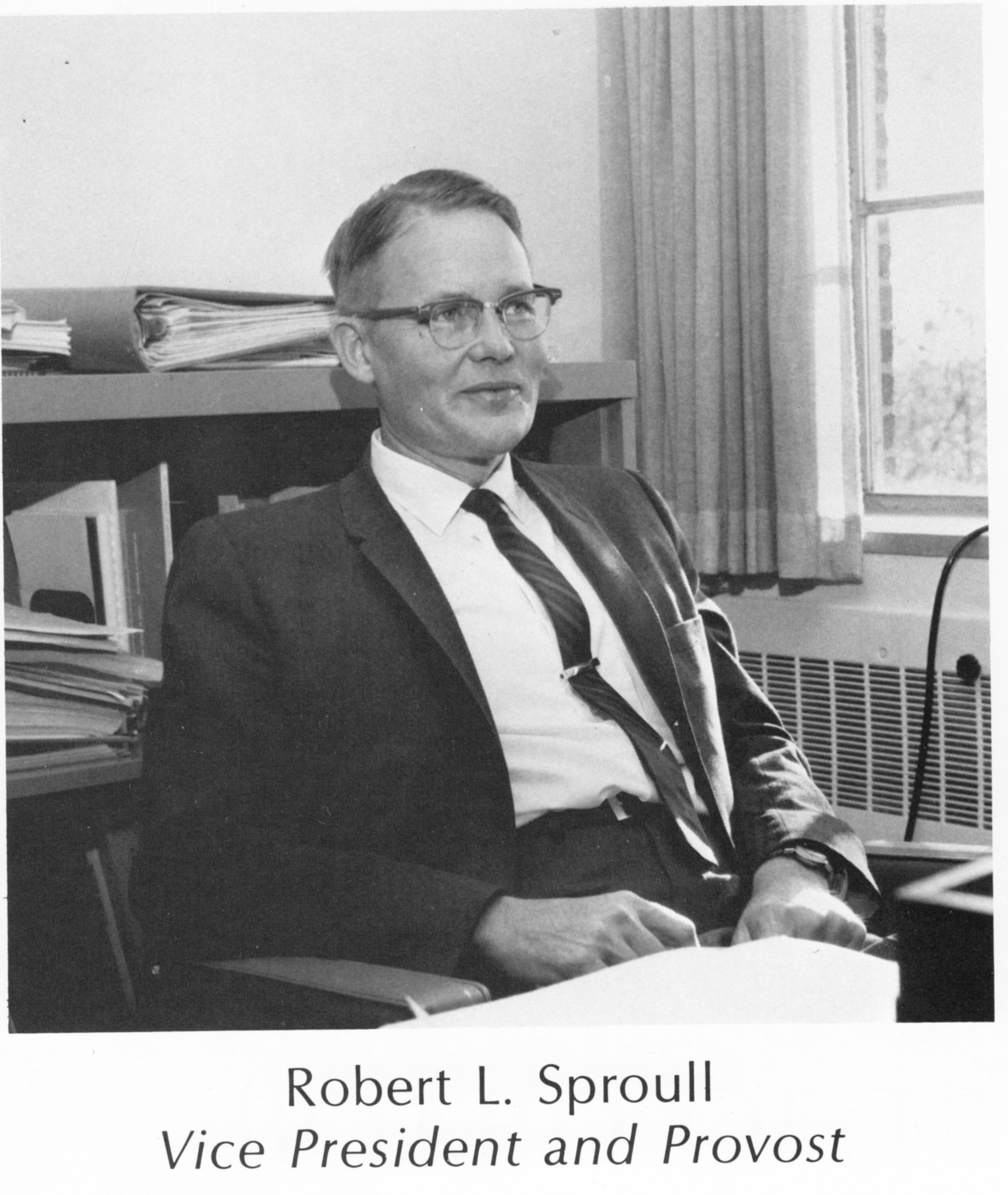

7th President of the University of Rochester
- In office 1970–1984
- Preceded by: W. Allen Wallis
- Succeeded by: G. Dennis O'Brien

2nd CEO of the University of Rochester
- In office 1975–1984
- Preceded by: W. Allen Wallis
- Succeeded by: G. Dennis O'Brien

Personal details
- Born: August 16, 1918 Lacon, Illinois, U.S.
- Died: October 9, 2014 (aged 96) Pittsford, New York, U.S.
- Spouse: Mary Louise Knickerbocker
- Children: Robert F. Sproull; Nancy Highbarger
- Parent: John Steele Sproull; Chloe Velma Lamb
- Education: Deep Springs College; Cornell University
- Profession: Administrator

Robert Lamb Sproull (August 16, 1918 – October 9, 2014) was an American educator, physicist and US Department of Defense official.

== Life and career ==
Sproull was born in Lacon, Illinois. A graduate of Deep Springs College, Sproull studied English literature at Cornell University before taking a PhD at the same university in physics. He began a promising and productive career as a physicist at Cornell and headed the Laboratory of Atomic and Solid State Physics (LASSP) and the Materials Science Center. Sproull left Cornell to become director of ARPA, where he was a strong advocate of cooperation among academia, government, and industry to meet US scientific needs for defense and competition with the Soviet Union.

After taking up an administrative post at Cornell, he became provost and vice president of the University of Rochester in 1968. While at Rochester, he also served on Cornell's board of trustees. In 1970, he became Rochester's president, and the trustees voted in 1974 to make him the university’s chief executive officer. He retired as president and became professor of physics at the university in 1985. He served on the board of the George C. Marshall Institute. He was chairman of the Defense Science Board. He was a member of the Roundtable Council of the National Academy of Sciences.

In 2005, the University of Rochester named its Center for High Intensity Laser Research in his honor. In 2006, Sproull and his wife donated $1 million to create the Robert L. and Mary L. Sproull Fund to support the work of the Cornell Center for Materials Research (CCMR). In 2006, Sproull was awarded the Telluride Tech Festival Award of Technology in Telluride, Colorado.

During his term as President of the University of Rochester, Sproull was known by the nickname "Particle Bob", a reference to his background in physics.

== Books ==
- Sproull, Robert (1963). Modern Physics. John Wiley & Sons Inc. pp. 630. ISBN 978-0-471-81845-8.

Government offices
Preceded by Jack P. Ruina	Director of ARPA; 1963 – 1965	Succeeded by Charles M. Herzfeld
Preceded by Frederick Seitz	Chairman of the Defense Science Board; 1969 – 1970	Succeeded by Gerald F. Tape
Academic offices
Preceded by McCrea Mazlett	Chancellor of the University of Rochester; 1968 – 1970	Succeeded by W. Allen Wallis
Preceded by W. Allen Wallis	President of the University of Rochester; 1970 – 1984	Succeeded by G. Dennis O'Brien
