= Robert Zoellick =

11th President of the World Bank Group

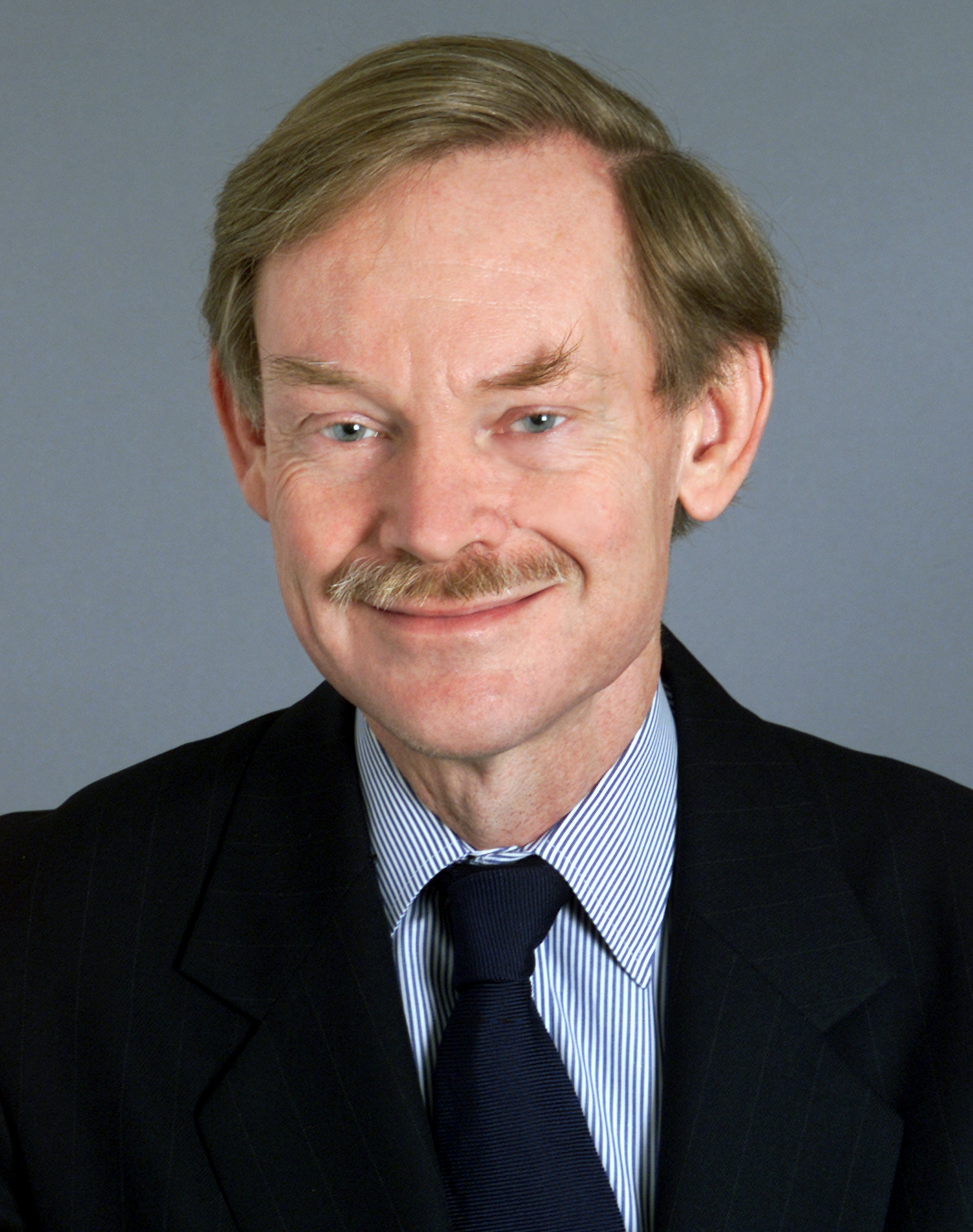
- Official portrait, 2008

11th President of the World Bank Group
- In office July 1, 2007 – June 30, 2012
- Preceded by: Paul Wolfowitz
- Succeeded by: Jim Yong Kim

14th United States Deputy Secretary of State
- In office February 23, 2005 – June 19, 2006
- President: George W. Bush
- Preceded by: Richard Armitage
- Succeeded by: John Negroponte

13th United States Trade Representative
- In office February 7, 2001 – February 22, 2005
- President: George W. Bush
- Preceded by: Charlene Barshefsky
- Succeeded by: Rob Portman

White House Deputy Chief of Staff
- In office August 23, 1992 – January 20, 1993
- President: George H. W. Bush
- Preceded by: Henson Moore
- Succeeded by: Mark Gearan

12th Undersecretary of State for Economic and Agricultural Affairs
- In office May 20, 1991 – August 23, 1992
- President: George H. W. Bush
- Preceded by: Dick McCormack
- Succeeded by: Joan Spero

24th Counselor of the United States Department of State
- In office March 2, 1989 – August 23, 1992
- President: George H. W. Bush
- Preceded by: Max Kampelman
- Succeeded by: Tim Wirth

Personal details
- Born: Robert Bruce Zoellick; July 25, 1953 (age 73) Evergreen Park, Illinois, U.S.
- Party: Republican
- Spouse: Sherry Ferguson
- Education: Swarthmore College (BA); Harvard University (JD, MPP)

Robert Bruce Zoellick (/ˈzɛlɪk/; German: [ˈtsœlɪk]; born July 25, 1953) is an American lawyer and government official who was the 11th president of the World Bank Group from 2007 to 2012. He was previously chairman of international advisors at Goldman Sachs from 2006 to 2007, United States Deputy Secretary of State from 2005 to 2006, and U.S. Trade Representative from 2001 to 2005. Prior to those posts, from 1985 to 2001, he served in the administrations of Ronald Reagan and George H. W. Bush, and the presidential campaign of George W. Bush, in addition to positions in various think tanks and academia.

Zoellick has been a senior fellow at Harvard's Belfer Center for Science and International Affairs since ending his term with the World Bank in 2012. Since 2017, he has been a Senior Counselor at Brunswick Group.

== Early life and education ==
Zoellick was born in Evergreen Park, Illinois, the son of Gladys (Lenz) and William T. Zoellick. His ancestors were German and he was raised Lutheran. He grew up in Naperville, Illinois, and attended Naperville Central High School, graduating in 1971.

After high school, Zoellick studied history as an undergraduate at Swarthmore College, where he graduated with his Bachelor of Arts in 1975 with membership in Phi Beta Kappa. He then dual enrolled at Harvard University, where he simultaneously studied public policy and law, earning his Juris Doctor (J.D.) from Harvard Law School and his Master of Public Policy from the Harvard Kennedy School in 1981.

== Career ==
=== Judicial clerkship (1982–1983) ===
Upon graduation from Harvard Law School, Zoellick served as a law clerk for Judge Patricia Wald on the United States Court of Appeals for the District of Columbia Circuit from 1982 to 1983.

=== Government service (1985–1992) ===
Zoellick was special assistant to Deputy Secretary of the Treasury Richard Darman from July to December 1985, and was counselor and executive secretary to United States Secretary of the Treasury James Baker from January to July 1988.

He was issues director for the 1988 George H. W. Bush Presidential campaign from July to November 1988.

During Bush's presidency, Zoellick served with Baker, by then Secretary of State, as Counselor of the United States Department of State from March 1989 to August 1992, and as Under Secretary of State for Economic and Agricultural Affairs from May 1991 to August 1992.

Zoellick served as Bush's personal representative or "sherpa" for the G7 Economic Summits in 1991 and 1992. He led the US Delegation to the Two Plus Four talks on German reunification; for his achievements in this role, the Federal Republic of Germany awarded him the Knight Commander's Cross of the Order of Merit.

Baker's book The Politics of Diplomacy describes Zoellick as his "right-hand man on NAFTA". In August 1992, Zoellick was appointed White House Deputy Chief of Staff and Assistant to the President.

=== Business, academia, and politics (1993–2001) ===
After leaving government service, Zoellick served from 1993 to 1997 as an Executive Vice President of Fannie Mae, and was also its General Counsel from 1993 through 1996. Afterwards, Zoellick was John M. Olin Visiting professor of National Security Affairs at the U.S. Naval Academy (1997–98); and Research Scholar at the Belfer Center for Science and International Affairs at Harvard University's John F. Kennedy School of Government (1999–2001). From July 1999 to February 2001, he was Senior International Advisor to Goldman Sachs.

He served as a member of the board of directors of the Council on Foreign Relations from 1994 through 2001. From 1997 to 2001, he also served as director of the Aspen Strategy Group.

From January 1999 to May 1999, Zoellick was president and CEO of the Center for Strategic and International Studies (CSIS). He resigned due to pressure from the board, which objected to his role as an occasional adviser to George W. Bush's 2000 presidential campaign.

In the 2000 presidential election campaign, Zoellick served as a foreign policy advisor to George W. Bush as part of a group, led by Condoleezza Rice, which she termed The Vulcans, after her home town of Birmingham, Alabama. James Baker designated him as his second-in-command—"a sort of chief operating officer or chief of staff"—in the 36-day battle over the 2000 United States presidential election recount in Florida.

=== U.S. Trade Representative (2001–2005) ===
George W. Bush named Zoellick U.S. Trade Representative in his first term, making him a member of the Executive Office of the President and Cabinet of the United States. He took office on February 7, 2001.

According to the Office of the United States Trade Representative website, Zoellick completed negotiations to bring China and Taiwan into the World Trade Organization (WTO); developed a strategy to launch new global trade negotiations at the World Trade Organization Ministerial Conference of 2001 in Doha, Qatar; worked with Congress to enact the 2001 Jordan–United States Free Trade Agreement and the 2001 Vietnam Trade Agreement; and worked with Congress to pass the Trade Act of 2002, which included new Trade Promotion Authority.

According to journalist and author Nikolas Kozloff, Zoellick relentlessly promoted the Central American Free Trade Agreement (CAFTA) over the objections of labor, environmentalist, and human rights groups, and engaged in fear-mongering around Daniel Ortega and Hugo Chavez to do so.

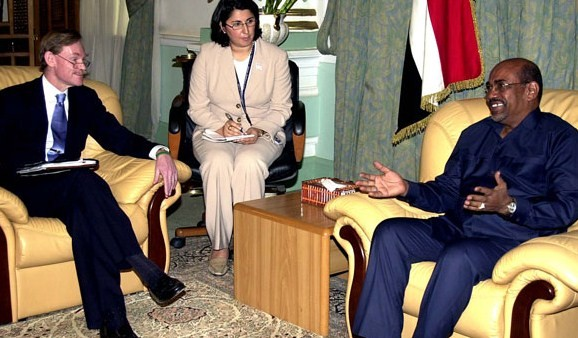
Zoellick and Sudanese President Omar al-Bashir, 2005

Zoellick played a key role in the U.S.-WTO dispute against the European Union over genetically modified foods. Before the U.S. filed its WTO lawsuit against the EU in 2003, Zoellick stated "The EU's moratorium violates WTO rules. People around the world have been eating biotech food for years. Biotech food helps nourish the world's hungry population, offers tremendous opportunities for better health and nutrition, and protects the environment by reducing soil erosion and pesticide use."

=== Deputy Secretary of State (2005–2006) ===
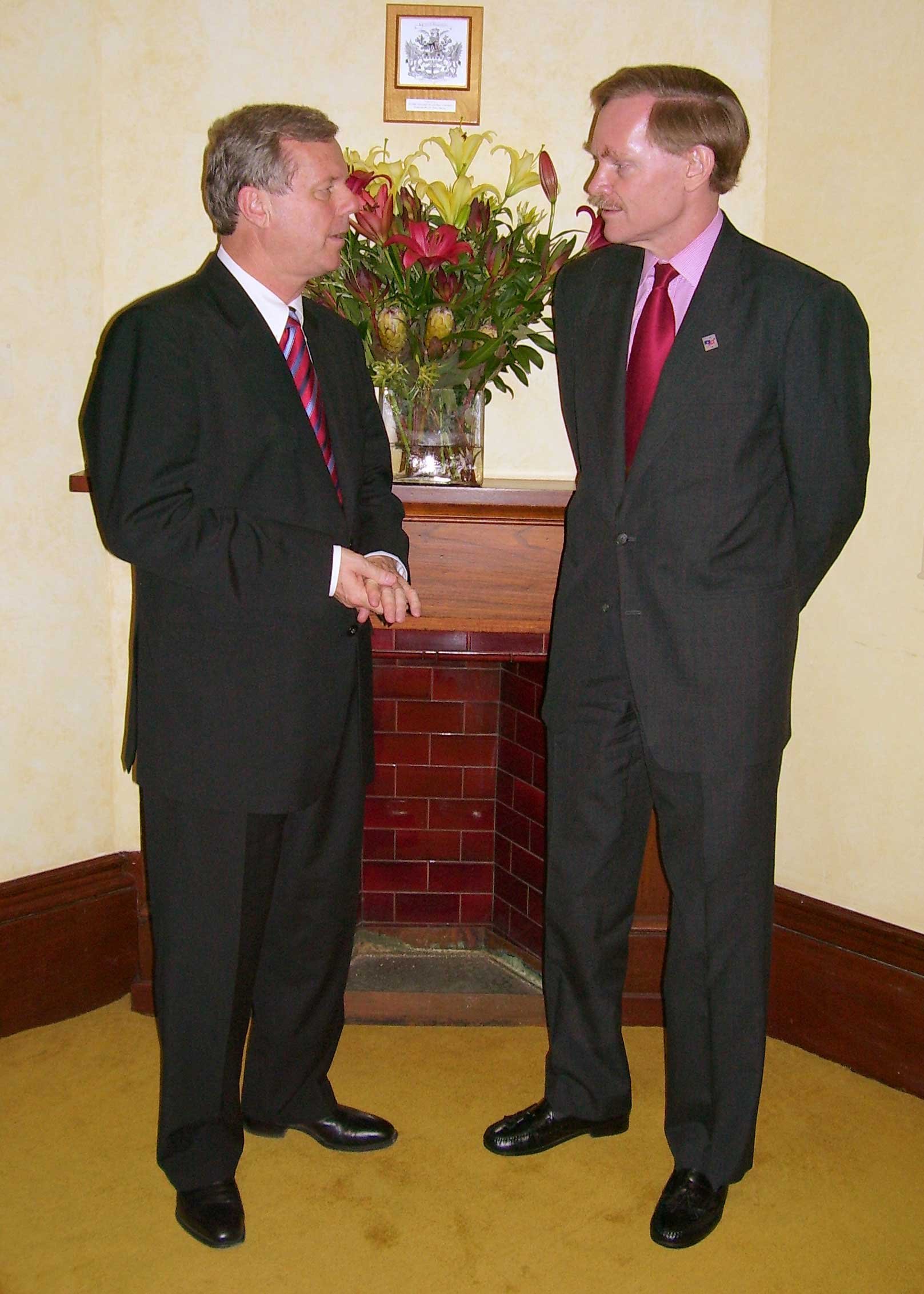
Zoellick with then Premier of South Australia Mike Rann in November 2005

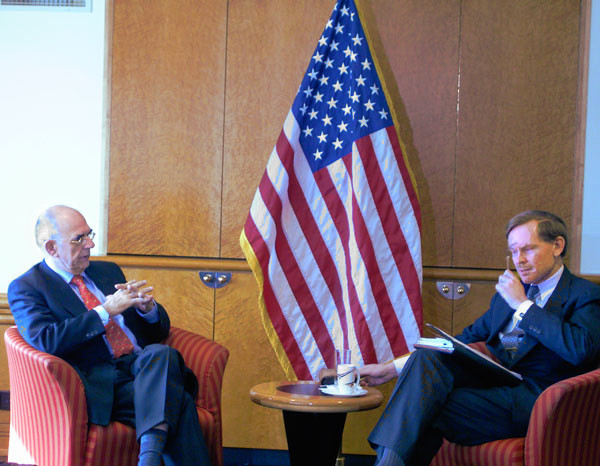
Zoellick (right) with Jan Pronk, the United Nations' special representative to Sudan.

On January 7, 2005, Bush nominated Zoellick to be Deputy Secretary of State. He assumed the office on February 22, 2005.

Zoellick was a major influence on the Bush administration's policies regarding China. In an important speech on September 21, 2005, Zoellick challenged China "to become a 'responsible stakeholder' in the international system, contributing more actively than in the past to help shore up the stability of the international system from which it ha[d] benefited so greatly."

Zoellick was also the Bush administration's point-man on the Darfur conflict peace process, making four trips to Sudan to press the two sides to agree. He spearheaded U.S. efforts in the 2006 Darfur Peace Agreement.

Zoellick resigned his position as U.S. Deputy Secretary of State in June 2006 to rejoin Goldman Sachs, this time as Vice Chairman, International, and to advise the investment bank on global strategy.

=== President of the World Bank (2007–2012) ===
On May 30, 2007, President George W. Bush nominated Zoellick to replace Paul Wolfowitz as President of the World Bank. He took office on July 1, 2007.

In a speech at the National Press Club in Washington in October 2007, Zoellick outlined "six strategic themes in support of the goal of an inclusive and sustainable globalization" to guide the future work of the World Bank: overcoming poverty and spurring sustainable growth in the poorest countries, especially Africa; addressing the problems of states coming out of conflict or seeking to avoid breakdown of the state; using a more differentiated business model for middle-income countries; fostering regional and global public goods that transcend national boundaries and benefit multiple countries and citizens; supporting development and opportunities in the Arab World; and using the World Bank's "brain trust" of applied experience to address the five other strategic themes.

During Zoellick's time at the World Bank, the institution's capital stock was expanded and lending volumes increased to help member countries deal with the global financial and economic crisis; assistance was stepped up to deal with the famine in the Horn of Africa; a major increase in resources was achieved for the institution's soft loan facility, the International Development Association (IDA), which lends to the poorest countries; and a reform was carried out to the World Bank's shareholding, Executive Board and voting structure, to increase the influence of developing and emerging economies in the World Bank's governance.

Zoellick made advances in the use of open data, promoted senior officials from developing countries, addressed climate change, expanded aid during the financial crisis and obtained a capital increase, with developing countries providing more than half.

Zoellick stepped down from the World Bank presidency when his term ended on June 30, 2012.

=== Senior Fellow at Harvard Kennedy School (2012–present) ===
After leaving the World Bank, Zoellick took up the position as a senior fellow at Harvard Kennedy School's Belfer Center for Science and International Affairs in July 2012.

From October 2013 to September 2016, he served as Chairman of International Advisors to Goldman Sachs.

=== Mitt Romney 2012 presidential campaign ===
In August 2012, during the 2012 United States presidential election, Zoellick was appointed to lead the national security portion of Republican candidate Mitt Romney's transition team should he be elected President of the United States. According to political commentator Fred Barnes, writing beforehand in The International Economy magazine, Zoellick at the time was considered a "heavyweight with impressive government experience".

The selection of Zoellick drew criticism from conservatives, especially neoconservatives.

Romney lost the election to incumbent Barack Obama.

== Additional posts ==
Zoellick is a member of the Council on Foreign Relations, and was on its board of directors from 1994 through 2001. He is a member of the Trilateral Commission. He was a participant in the Bilderberg Group from 2003 through at least 2017, and was a member of its steering committee.

He is also a member of Washington, D.C.–based think tank, The Inter-American Dialogue. He chairs the Global Tiger Initiative, and is a member of the Global Leadership Council of Mercy Corps, a global humanitarian agency.

Since 2013, he has been a member of the board of directors of the Peterson Institute for International Economics, and since 2018 of the Carnegie Endowment for International Peace.

In May 2017, Zoellick joined Brunswick Group, a global public affairs and communications firm, as a Senior Counselor, and in February 2018 he was made one of the four principals of Brunswick's newly launched Brunswick Geopolitical. Since November 2020 he has been chair of Standard Chartered's international advisory council. Since June 2021 he has been an independent director of Robinhood.

He is a trustee of the Wildlife Conservation Society, and has served on the advisory board of the World Wildlife Fund.

Zoellick was a board member Said Holdings from 1996 to 2001. He was on the board of the Precursor Group from October 2000 to February 2001, and was a member of the advisory board of the venture fund Viventures from October 2000 to February 2001.

Zoellick was a board member of Alliance Capital Management from 1997 to 2001, and served as chairman of AllianceBernstein from 2017 to 2019. He was also on the advisory board of AXA, AllianceBernstein's parent company.

From January 1999 to February 2001, he was a member of the advisory council at Enron.

From 2013 to 2023, Zoellick was a board member of Temasek Holdings, Singapore's sovereign wealth fund. Since 2023, he has been Temasek's Chairman, Americas and Chairman of the Temasek Americas Advisory Panel.

He was on the board of directors of Laureate International Universities from December 2013 through December 2017.

Jack Dorsey announced on July 19, 2018, that Zoellick would be a member of Twitter's board of directors. As of April 22, 2022, Zoellick had neither posted on Twitter nor liked any other tweet. Elon Musk dissolved Twitter's board of directors in October 2022, after purchasing the website.

He has served on the international advisory board of Rolls-Royce Holdings.

He has served as both a fellow and a trustee of the German Marshall Fund. He has served on the board of the European Institute. He was a member of Secretary William Cohen's Defense Policy Board Advisory Committee.

== Honors ==
He is a recipient of the Distinguished Service Award, the Department of State's highest honor; the Alexander Hamilton Award of the Department of the Treasury; and the Medal for Distinguished Public Service of the Department of Defense.

In 1992, he received the Knight Commander's Cross of the Order of Merit of the Federal Republic of Germany for his eminent achievements in the course of German reunification. In 2002, he was awarded an honorary Doctor of Humane Letters from Saint Joseph's College in Rensselaer, Indiana. The Mexican and Chilean governments awarded him their highest honors for non-citizens, the Aztec Eagle and the Order of Merit, for recognition of his work on free trade, development, and the environment.

In 2016, he received the Annenberg Award for Excellence in Diplomacy.

In 2017, he was a recipient of the Economic Club of Minnesota's Bill Frenzel Champion of Free Trade Award.

== Views ==
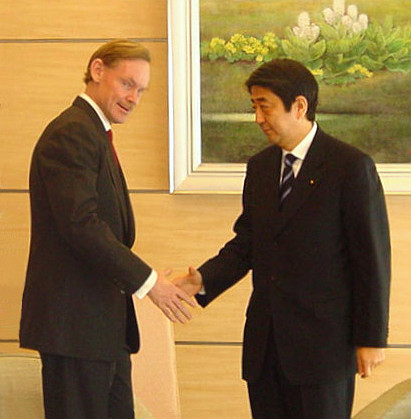
Robert Zoellick meets with Shinzo Abe in January 2006

In a January 2000 Foreign Affairs essay entitled "Campaign 2000: A Republican Foreign Policy," Zoellick noted five Republican principles (respect for power, building and sustaining coalitions and alliances, recognizing common interests with international agreements and institutions, embracing new technologies for global politics and security, and the continuing presence of bad actors. "[T]here is still evil in the world—people who hate America and the ideas for which it stands. Today, we face enemies who are hard at work to develop nuclear, biological, and chemical weapons, along with the missiles to deliver them. The United States must remain vigilant and have the strength to defeat its enemies. People driven by enmity or by a need to dominate will not respond to reason or goodwill. They will manipulate civilized rules for uncivilized ends."

In Australia's New Left Review, Gavan McCormack wrote that as USTR Zoellick had intervened during a 2004 privatization issue in Japanese Prime Minister Junichiro Koizumi's re-election campaign: "The office of the U.S. Trade Representative has played an active part in drafting the Japan Post privatization law. An October 2004 letter from Robert Zoellick to Japan's Finance Minister Takenaka Heizo, tabled in the Diet on August 2, 2005, included a handwritten note from Zoellick commending Takenaka. Challenged to explain this apparent U.S. government intervention in a domestic matter, Koizumi merely expressed his satisfaction that Takenaka had been befriended by such an important figure… It is hard to overestimate the scale of the opportunity offered to U.S. and global finance capital by the privatization of the Postal Savings System."

In the lead-up to the 2010 G-20 Seoul summit and in the immediate wake of the U.S. elections and subsequent Fed QE2 monetary-policy move, Zoellick wrote in a Financial Times editorial that the Group of 20 leading economies should consider adopting a global reserve currency based on gold as part of structural reforms to the world's foreign-exchange regime.

In March 2016, Zoellick was one of three Cabinet-level Republican officials to oppose Trump's presidential candidacy, in an open letter signed by 122 members of the Republican national security community. In August 2016, Zoellick signed a letter from 50 of America's most senior Republican national security officials, which warned that a Donald Trump presidency would be a national security risk and would threaten the nation's well-being. In a November 1, 2016, interview with Deutsche Welle, Zoellick said "My belief differences with Trump were not only placed on policy – his protectionism, his infatuation with authoritarian leaders and Vladimir Putin. But also that I think he is a narcissistic, ego-driven person and that he would be dangerous. I have had the good fortune to serve a number of different presidents and I know the importance of that job and I don't want him in the Oval Office."

Zoellick is the author of the 2020 book, America in the World: A History of U.S. Diplomacy and Foreign Policy, which asserts that since the country's founding, U.S. foreign policy has been defined by five traditions: the continent of North America; trade, transnationalism and technology; alliances and order; public and congressional support; and America's purpose.

== Personal life ==
Zoellick married Sherry Lynn Ferguson in 1980. They live in McLean, Virginia.

== See also ==
- 2008–2009 Keynesian resurgence

Political offices
Preceded by Max Kampelman	Counselor of the United States Department of State; 1989–1992	Succeeded by Tim Wirth
Preceded by Dick McCormack	Undersecretary of State for Economic and Agricultural Affairs; 1991–1992	Succeeded by Joan Spero
Preceded by Charlene Barshefsky	United States Trade Representative; 2001–2005	Succeeded by Rob Portman
Preceded by Richard Armitage	United States Deputy Secretary of State; 2005–2006	Succeeded by John Negroponte
Diplomatic posts
Preceded by Paul Wolfowitz	President of the World Bank Group; 2007–2012	Succeeded by Jim Yong Kim
