= Josette Sheeran =

American executive and diplomat (born 1954)

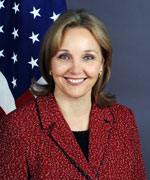
- Official portrait, 2005

Executive Director of the McCain Institute
- In office March 14, 2021 – May 2, 2022
- Preceded by: Mark Green
- Succeeded by: Evelyn Farkas

Executive Director of the World Food Programme
- In office April 4, 2007 – April 5, 2012
- Secretary General: Ban Ki-moon
- Preceded by: James Morris
- Succeeded by: Ertharin Cousin

16th Under Secretary of State for Economic, Business, and Agricultural Affairs
- In office August 23, 2005 – April 4, 2007
- President: George W. Bush
- Preceded by: Alan Larson
- Succeeded by: Reuben Jeffery III

Personal details
- Born: June 12, 1954 (age 72) Orange, New Jersey, U.S.
- Party: Republican
- Spouse: Whitney Shiner (deceased)
- Education: University of Colorado Boulder (BA)

Josette Sheeran (born 12 June 1954) is an American diplomat, humanitarian, and businesswoman.

She served in the United States Department of State as Under Secretary of State for Secretary of State Condoleezza Rice covering Economic Growth, Energy, Technology, Agriculture and the Environment, with the rank of Ambassador. She served as Ambassador and Deputy U.S. Trade Representative under President George Bush, covering all Asia, Africa and Intellectual Property, Technology and Agriculture from 2001 to 2005.

She currently serves as founder and CEO of Firefly Global Group, a geopolitical and business consulting firm, supporting founders and accelerating new technologies which enhance national and human security.

Sheeran served as the seventh president and CEO of Asia Society from 2013 to 2020. Sheeran was also the United Nations' Special Envoy for Haiti, successfully leading efforts to end a devastating cholera epidemic there.

Sheeran is former Vice Chair of the World Economic Forum. While there, she helped found and advance global initiatives encompassing global, regional, and industry agendas such as Grow Africa, launching new technologies and attracting over $300 million in private sector investment to end aid dependency and tackle hunger and malnutrition in Africa.

She was the eleventh executive director of the United Nations World Food Programme (WFP), appointed by United Nations Secretary-General, leading the world's biggest humanitarian supply chains delivering over 20 billion meals a year to war and disaster zones. In the role she introduced the first block chain to deliver food and cash to war zones such as Syria, and successfully negotiated access into Somalia, North Korea and Libya. Kofi Annan in November 2006. The World Food Program was awarded the Nobel Peace Prize in 2020.

Sheeran served as the seventh president and CEO of Asia Society from 2013 to 2020. Sheeran was also the United Nations' Special Envoy for Haiti, successfully leading efforts to end a devastating cholera epidemic there.

Sheeran served as a diplomat and negotiator for the United States, and was unanimously confirmed by the United States Senate twice. She was appointed coordinator of the Pakistan earthquake response by Secretary of State Condoleezza Rice, and developed economic recovery plans for front line areas in Pakistan, Afghanistan and beyond. She has served on the boards of Overseas Private Investment Corporation, and the Millennium Challenge Corporation; US Representative to UNESCO, as well as the lead U.S. representative to the Asia-Pacific Economic Cooperation and the OECD.

On July 26, 2021, she was appointed President of Canoo (NASDAQ: GOEV) an electric vehicle startup based in Los Angeles with manufacturing facilities in Oklahoma City, OK.

== Early life and education ==
Sheeran was born in Orange, New Jersey, and is one of six siblings. She earned a Bachelor of Arts from the University of Colorado Boulder in 1976.

== Career ==
=== World Food Programme ===
As executive director of the World Food Programme, Sheeran was responsible for managing the world's largest humanitarian organization with nearly 11,000 staff worldwide. WFP provides emergency food aid to the world's hungry as well as addressing the causes of chronic hunger. The organization was awarded the Nobel Peace Prize in 2020 "for its efforts to combat hunger, for its contribution to bettering conditions for peace in conflict-affected areas and for acting as a driving force in efforts to prevent the use of hunger as a weapon of war and conflict."

Under Sheeran's leadership, WFP enacted financial and structural reforms designed to increase transparency and agility. She pioneered new initiatives such as the African Risk Capacity (ARC), the first disaster insurance model for Africa, and “Purchase for Progress” in more than a dozen nations and conflict zones. She led WFP in diversifying its donor base to more than 100 nations and became the first UN program to include the so-called BRIC countries and the Gulf States among its top 10 donors, she also increased private sector partnerships 10 fold to around $100 million a year. She instituted key reforms to reduce dependency on food aid among millions of aid recipients.

In April 2008, Sheeran attracted worldwide attention with a speech in London warning about an impending worldwide food crisis, which she likened to a "silent tsunami" and lobbied the United States and other governments to give more aid to the world's poor. Sheeran expressed commitment to meeting the UN Millennium Development Goal of halving hunger and poverty by 2015. In January 2009, Sheeran called on the government of Israel to allow more United Nations food aid to the people in Gaza during the conflict there.

Sheeran's influential TED Talk on ending world hunger has been viewed more than one million times and has been used in schools to teach children about ending hunger through innovation and partnerships.

Ms. Sheeran chaired the UN High Level Committee on Management for two terms, leading more than 40 UN entities in a series of historic reforms, from the adoption of International Public Accounting Standards (IPSAS), to enacting world-class agreements on transparency, ethics, whistle-blowing, financial disclosure and technology.

In January 2012, Sheeran announced that she would assume the role of Vice Chairman of the World Economic Forum upon completing her term at WFP in 2012.

=== United Nations Envoy to Haiti ===
Sheeran also served as the UN Special Envoy to Haiti, appointed on June 20, 2017, representing United Nations Secretary General António Guterres in advancing Haiti's transition from an aid-dependent economy, at the end of more than 17 years of United Nations peace-keeping operations. She has crafted the first United Nations "pay for success" development bond to help secure an end to the transmission of cholera in Haiti.

The New United Nations' Approach to Cholera in Haiti was launched under former Secretary General Ban Ki-Moon when he publicly apologized for the United Nations' role in Haiti's cholera epidemic in December 2016. The apology came six years after soldiers from the UN's peacekeeping mission in Haiti, MINUSTAH, introduced the disease by contaminating Haiti's Artibonite River, causing more than 10,000 deaths.

Pedro Medrano Rojas, a Chilean diplomat, originally led the United Nations' cholera response, and left in 2015 upset that the international community failed to "acknowledge the fact that we have in Haiti the largest epidemic in the Western Hemisphere." David Nabarro was originally placed in charge of fundraising for the United Nations' new approach.

=== Under Secretary of State for Economic, Business, and Agricultural Affairs ===
As Under Secretary of State for Economic, Business, and Agricultural Affairs, Sheeran led new State Department initiatives in supporting Central Asia's and Afghanistan's economic transformation and reconstruction. She was also responsible for a range of economic issues including: development, trade, agriculture, finance, energy, telecommunications and transportation. She helped foster and carry out aid and development initiatives in countries like China, India, Pakistan, Afghanistan and Lebanon.

Sheeran also served as the Foreign Affairs Sous-Sherpa on behalf of the President of the United States at the Group of Eight (G8) Summit. She headed a host of high-level bilateral or multilateral economic dialogues with the European Union, China, India, Japan, Iraq, Afghanistan, and many others.

She was named by former United Nations Secretary General Kofi Annan along with Prime Ministers Luisa Dias Diogo, Prime Minister of Mozambique; Jens Stoltenberg, Prime Minister of Norway; and Shaukat Aziz, Prime Minister of Pakistan, to the High Level Panel on System-Wide Coherence. The panel conducted hundreds of interviews with development and humanitarian experts, non-governmental organizations and national leaders worldwide, and compiled strategies and recommendations for greater management coherence and effectiveness in United Nations efforts in the areas of the environment, development and humanitarian assistance.

She represented the United States at a wide variety of high-level bilateral and multilateral meetings, serving as Alternative Governor for the World Bank; the Inter-American Development Bank; the African Development Bank; the Asian Development Bank; and the European Bank for Reconstruction and Development. Congress also confirmed her as a Member of the board of directors for the Overseas Private Investment Corporation.

=== Deputy United States Trade Representative ===
Prior to her tenure as Under Secretary, Sheeran served as Deputy United States Trade Representative in the Office of the U.S. Trade Representative (USTR). There, she was responsible for trade negotiations and treaties in Asia and Africa, driving U.S. efforts to open new markets and enforce existing trade agreements in China, East Asia, South Asia and Africa and for advancing global negotiations on counterfeiting, pharmaceuticals, labor, environment and trade capacity building. One of her legacy projects was fighting global counterfeiting, creating STOP – Strategy Targeting Organized Piracy and the protection of Intellectual Property. She helped bring to a successful conclusion the landmark Australia-United States Free Trade Agreement, which is expected to increase U.S. exports to Australia by $2 billion a year. She also led trade enforcement negotiations with China and furthered U.S. trade and investment interests in direct talks with Japan, Korea, India and many other nations.

=== Management ===
Before joining USTR, Sheeran was managing director of Starpoint Solutions, a Wall Street technology firm that works with Fortune 500 clients. During her tenure at Starpoint she led major strategic projects with corporate leaders such as Bank of America, Citibank and the Associated Press. Sheeran also served as president and chief executive officer of Empower America, where she developed its agenda of trade policy, technology policy, education reform, and tax reform, and advancing the agenda of Empowerment Economics to transform America's poorest cities and regions under the leadership of Jack Kemp and Ambassador Jeane Kirkpatrick.

=== Journalistic experience ===
Sheeran got her start in journalism in 1976 with the New York News World, which was owned by News World Communications, an international media conglomerate owned by the Unification Church, of which she was a longtime member. She served in a number of capacities for News World, eventually becoming their White House correspondent. In 1982, she moved to News World's new sister paper, The Washington Times. Originally a features editor, she was eventually appointed managing editor. During her tenure as managing editor of The Washington Times, she appeared as a commentator on programs such as Nightline, Fox News, The McLaughlin Group, The Diane Rehm Show, and CNN. Sheeran also wrote a nationally syndicated column for Scripps Howard News Service. She has had interviews with more than a dozen heads of state in Europe, Asia, Latin America and the United States, most famously her interview with North Korean head of state Kim Il Sung. She has twice served as a Pulitzer Prize juror.

== Boards and honors ==
Ambassador Sheeran serves on the boards of Capital Group funds, which manages more than $2.5 trillion in global investments; Vestergaard International, which has delivered 1 billion high tech nets to prevent deaths from malaria; Lifestraw, a pioneer in access to safe water; Sceye, the world's first stationary stratospheric vessel and the Business Council for International Understanding. She also serves on the Board of Directors, and as co-chair of the Finance & Human Resources Committee, of the Alliance for a Green Revolution in Africa (AGRA), founded through a partnership between the Rockefeller Foundation and the Bill & Melinda Gates Foundation in 2006 in response to a call from former United Nations Secretary-General Kofi Annan, who said the time had come for African farmers to wage a “uniquely African Green Revolution.”

Sheeran is a member of the Council on Foreign Relations.

In 2011, Forbes named her the world's 30th most powerful woman; Foreign Policy listed her among its top 100 global 'Twitterati'. She was a Fisher Fellow at the Harvard Kennedy School Belfer Center in 2013. She graduated from the University of Colorado Boulder and has been awarded numerous honorary doctorate degrees, including from Michigan State University and the University of Colorado.

She was awarded Japan's Niigata International Food Award, Commandeur de l'Ordre du Mérite Agricole by the government of France, and Brazil's highest civilian award, the Grand Official Order of the ‘Rio Branco,’ and the "Game Changer" award by HuffPost.

== See also ==
- 2007–2008 world food price crisis

Political offices
Preceded by Alan Larson	Under Secretary of State for Economic, Business, and Agricultural Affairs; 2005–2007	Succeeded by Reuben Jeffery III
Diplomatic posts
Preceded by James Morris	Executive Director of the World Food Programme; 2007–2012	Succeeded by Ertharin Cousin
