= Nives Dolšak =

Professor of economics and sustainability

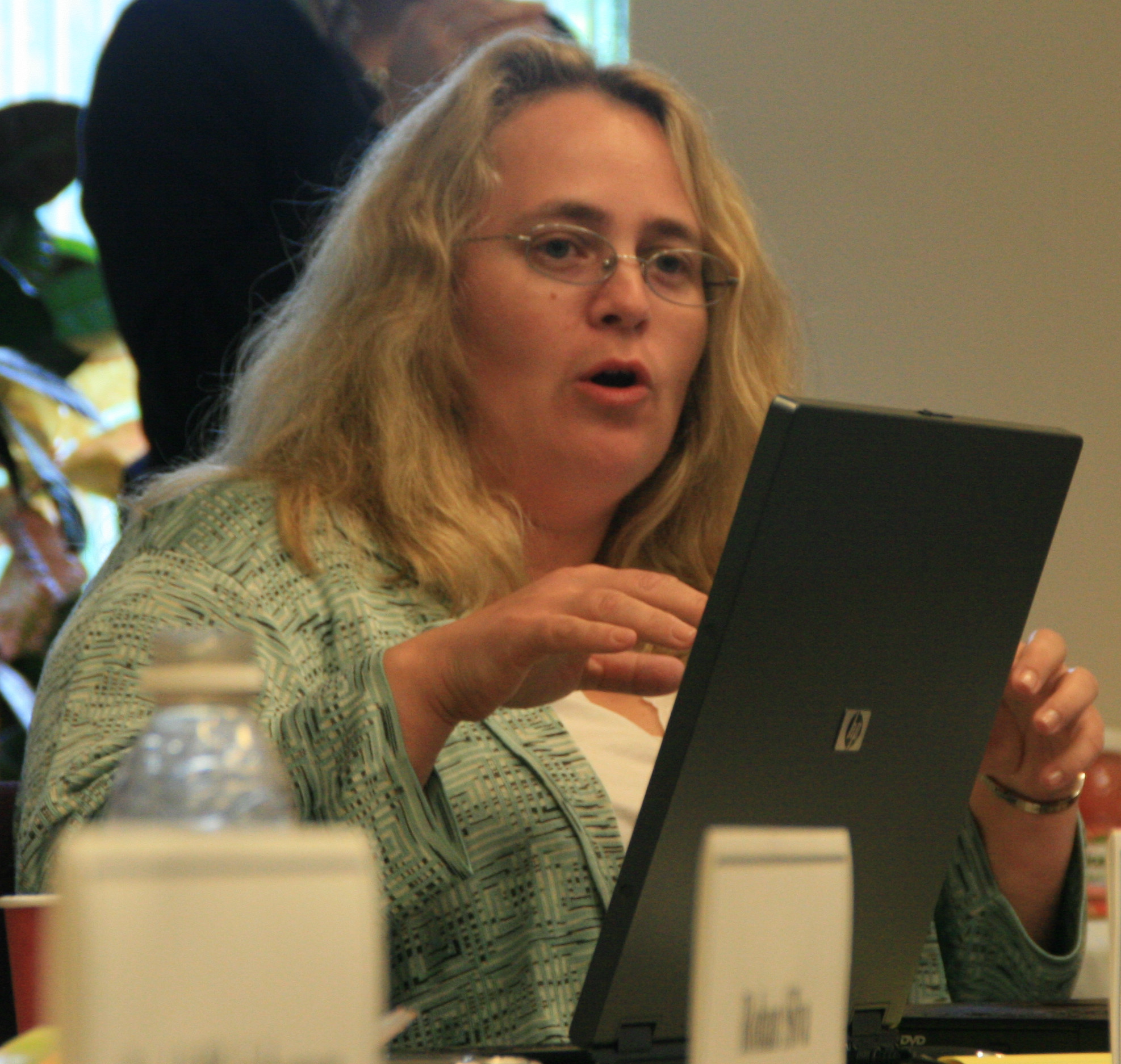

Academic background
- Education: University of Ljubljana; Indiana University Bloomington
- Thesis: Marketable Permits: Managing Local, Regional, and Global Commons

Academic work
- Discipline: sustainability
- Institutions: University of Washington; University of Washington Bothell; University of Ljubljana; Indiana University Bloomington
- Main interests: common pool resources global climate change policies
- Notable works: The Commons in the New Millennium: Challenges and Adaptation (2003)
- Website: faculty.washington.edu/nives/

Nives Dolšak is the Stan and Alta Barer Professor in Sustainability Science, and the director of the School of Marine and Environmental Affairs at the University of Washington in Seattle, Washington. She has also served as a visiting professor of Economics at the University of Ljubljana, Slovenia.

Dolšak studies the aggregation and governance of common pool resources, including practices such as community action, social capital, market-based instruments, traditional regulatory policies, and the effects of globalization. She focuses on political and economic factors that influence the adoption of environmental policies such as the mitigation of global climate change. Her research ranges from local to international levels, including the state of Washington, the United States, Eastern and Central Europe, and the world.

Dolšak is a co-editor with Elinor Ostrom of The Drama of the Commons (2002) and The Commons in the New Millennium: Challenges and Adaptation (2003).

== Early life and education ==
Dolšak earned a Bachelor of Arts in Economics from the University of Ljubljana, Slovenia. Dolšak attended Indiana University Bloomington, from which she received a Joint Ph.D. in Public Policy and International Relations in 2000.

== Career ==
Dolšak joined the School of Marine and Environmental Affairs (SMEA) at the University of Washington in 2010. As of 2013 she was hired under a 50%-50% joint appointment at the School of Interdisciplinary Arts and Sciences at University of Washington Bothell and the School of Marine and Environmental Affairs in the College of the Environment at UW Seattle. As of 2014, she became 100% full-time at SMEA. She became director of the SMEA and the Stan and Alta Barer Professor in Sustainability Science in 2019.

From 2012-2018, Dolšak was also a visiting professor in Economics at the University of Ljubljana in Slovenia.

In 2022, Dolšak was appointed to the Coastal Marine Advisory Council by the Governor of Washington, Jay Inslee. She also serves on the Science Panel of the Puget Sound Partnership.

Dolšak is a contributor to Forbes and other publications.

== Awards and honors ==
- 1992-1993, Fulbright Visiting Scholar, Slovenia
- 2013, Outstanding Teaching Faculty Award, College of the Environment, University of Washington
- 2018, Outstanding Community Impact Award, College of the Environment, University of Washington

== Selected publications ==
=== Books ===
- Ostrom, Elinor; Dietz, Thomas; Dolšak, Nives; Stern, Paul C.; Stonich, Susan; Weber, Elke U., eds. (2002). The drama of the commons. Washington, DC: National Academy Press. ISBN 978-0309082501.
- Dolšak, Nives; Ostrom, Elinor, eds. (2003). The commons in the new millennium: challenges and adaptation. Cambridge, Mass: MIT Press. ISBN 9780262541428.

=== Journal articles ===
- Hicks, Christina C.; Levine, Arielle; Agrawal, Arun; Basurto, Xavier; Breslow, Sara J.; Carothers, Courtney; Charnley, Susan; Coulthard, Sarah; Dolšak, Nives; Donatuto, Jamie; Garcia-Quijano, Carlos; Mascia, Michael B.; Norman, Karma; Poe, Melissa R.; Satterfield, Terre; St. Martin, Kevin; Levin, Phillip S. (April 2016). "Engage key social concepts for sustainability". Science. 352 (6281): 38–40. doi:10.1126/science.aad4977.
- Hrovatin, Nevenka; Dolšak, Nives; Zorić, Jelena (20 July 2016). "Factors impacting investments in energy efficiency and clean technologies: empirical evidence from Slovenian manufacturing firms". Journal of Cleaner Production. 127: 475–486. doi:10.1016/j.jclepro.2016.04.039. ISSN 0959-6526.
- Chrun, Elizabeth; Dolšak, Nives; Prakash, Aseem (17 October 2016). "Corporate Environmentalism: Motivations and Mechanisms". Annual Review of Environment and Resources. 41: 341–362. doi:10.1146/annurev-environ-110615-090105. ISSN 1543-5938.
- Breslow, Sara Jo; Sojka, Brit; Barnea, Raz; Basurto, Xavier; Carothers, Courtney; Charnley, Susan; Coulthard, Sarah; Dolšak, Nives; Donatuto, Jamie; García-Quijano, Carlos; Hicks, Christina C.; Levine, Arielle; Mascia, Michael B.; Norman, Karma; Poe, Melissa; Satterfield, Terre; Martin, Kevin St.; Levin, Phillip S. (1 December 2016). "Conceptualizing and operationalizing human wellbeing for ecosystem assessment and management". Environmental Science & Policy. 66: 250–259. doi:10.1016/j.envsci.2016.06.023. ISSN 1462-9011.
- Dolšak, Nives; Prakash, Aseem (17 October 2018). "The Politics of Climate Change Adaptation". Annual Review of Environment and Resources. 43: 317–341. doi:10.1146/annurev-environ-102017-025739. ISSN 1543-5938.
- Scurlock, Rebecca; Dolsak, Nives; Prakash, Aseem (1 February 2020). "Recovering from Scandals: Twitter Coverage of Oxfam and Save the Children Scandals". VOLUNTAS: International Journal of Voluntary and Nonprofit Organizations. 31 (1): 94–110. doi:10.1007/s11266-019-00148-x. ISSN 1573-7888.
- Dolšak, Nives; Prakash, Aseem (12 May 2022). "Three Faces of Climate Justice". Annual Review of Political Science. 25: 283–301. doi:10.1146/annurev-polisci-051120-125514. ISSN 1094-2939.
