= Under Secretary of State for Economic Growth, Energy, and the Environment =

U.S. government position

United States Under Secretary of State for Economic Affairs
- Seal of the United States Department of State

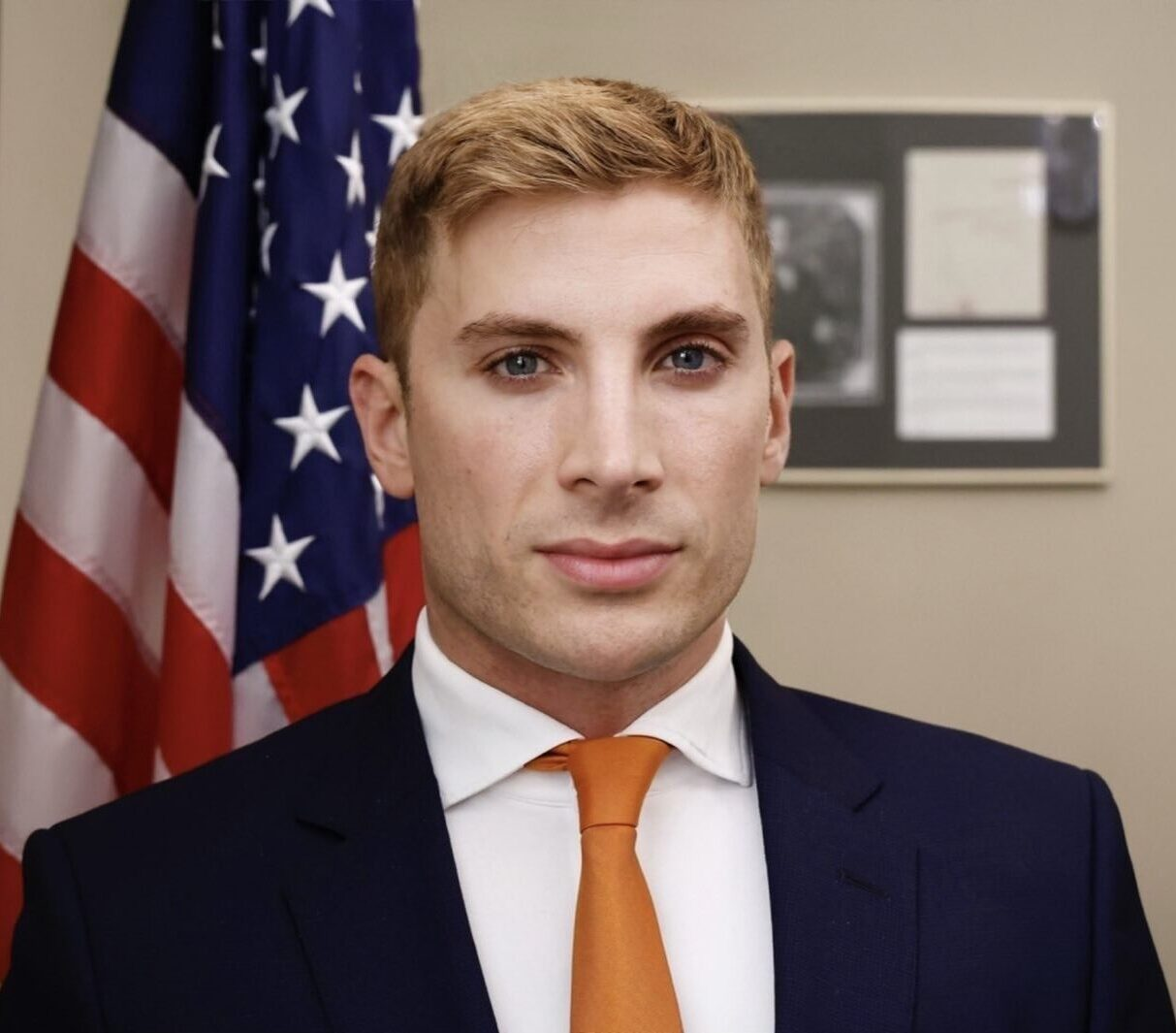
- Incumbent; Jacob Helberg since October 16, 2025
- Department of State
- Reports to: The U.S. secretary of state
- Seat: Washington, D.C.
- Appointer: The president with Senate advice and consent
- Term length: No fixed term
- Inaugural holder: William L. Clayton
- Formation: August 1, 1946
- Salary: Executive Schedule, Level 3
- Website: state.gov/e

The under secretary of state for economic affairs is an undersecretary position within the United States Department of State. The under secretary for economic growth, energy, and the environment serves as senior economic advisor at the State Department and advises the secretary of state on international economic policy and is often referred to as the senior economic diplomat of the United States. The under secretary also leads the work of the department on trade, agriculture, aviation, and bilateral trade relations with America's economic partners.

The position is called “E” within the State Department. Responsibilities include international trade and investment policy; international finance, development, and debt policy; economic sanctions and combating terrorist financing; international energy security policy and energy law; international telecommunications and transportation policies; support for U.S. businesses, and economic policy analysis, public diplomacy and private sector outreach. E also serves as the Privacy Shield ombudsperson.

== History ==
An act of Congress first authorized an under secretary of state for economic affairs on August 1, 1946, for a 2-year period as the third-ranking officer in the department. The position was not renewed, however, and between 1947 and 1958 the ranking officer in the department handling foreign economic matters was either a deputy under secretary or an assistant secretary of state. On June 30, 1958, Congress re-established the position in the Mutual Security Act. The following year, the Department of State Organization Act of July 30, 1959, authorized the president to appoint either an under secretary for political affairs or an under secretary for economic affairs.

Between 1959 and 1972, during periods when there was no under secretary of state for economic affairs, the ranking officer for foreign economic affairs was again either a deputy under secretary or an assistant secretary of state. On July 13, 1972, Congress established separate and permanent positions at the under secretary of state level for economic affairs and for political affairs, in the Foreign Relations Authorization Act. On August 16, 1985, Congress changed the title to include agricultural affairs. The under secretary for economic and agricultural affairs serves as the principal adviser to the secretary and deputy secretary (previously under secretary) on matters relating to foreign economic and commercial policy. Specified duties, responsibilities, and assignments have varied over time. Each incumbent is commissioned with a functional designation as part of his title. On May 12, 1994, the title was changed to Under Secretary of State for Economic, Business, and Agricultural Affairs. It was changed again in 2011 to Under Secretary for Economic Growth, Energy, and the Environment after the reorganization of the EEB bureau to EB, and the spin off of two new bureaus under the under secretary.

As of 2019, the E is also charged with advancing the State Department's economic development agenda; elevating and intensifying the department's efforts related to energy security, clean energy, and environmental sustainability; and fostering innovation through robust science, entrepreneurship, and technology policies. The E covers issues that reach from the vastness of space, through the Office of Space Affairs, to the depths of the oceans with the goal of advancing U.S. strategic interests through policy aimed at ensuring that economic growth and a healthy planet go hand in hand.

In 2025, the position's title reverted back to its original name of "under secretary of state for economic affairs."

== List of under secretaries of state ==
=== Economic affairs (1946–1985) ===
#	Name	Assumed office	Left office	President served under
1	William L. Clayton	August 3, 1946	October 15, 1947	Harry S. Truman
2	C. Douglas Dillon	July 1, 1958	June 11, 1959	Dwight D. Eisenhower
3	George W. Ball	February 1, 1961	December 3, 1961	John F. Kennedy
4	Thomas C. Mann	March 18, 1965	May 31, 1966	Lyndon B. Johnson
5	William J. Casey	February 2, 1973	March 14, 1974	Richard Nixon
6	Charles W. Robinson	January 3, 1975	April 9, 1976	Gerald Ford
7	William D. Rogers	June 18, 1976	December 31, 1976	Gerald Ford
8	Richard N. Cooper	April 8, 1977	January 19, 1981	Jimmy Carter
9	Myer Rashish	June 29, 1981	January 20, 1982	Ronald Reagan
10	W. Allen Wallis	September 23, 1982	January 20, 1989	Ronald Reagan

=== Economic and agricultural affairs (1985–1994) ===
The office of Under Secretary of State for Economic Affairs was renamed the under secretary of state for economic and agricultural affairs on August 16, 1985.

#	Name	Assumed office	Left office	President served under
10	W. Allen Wallis	September 23, 1982	January 20, 1989	Ronald Reagan
11	Richard T. McCormack	April 14, 1989	May 3, 1991	George H. W. Bush
12	Robert Zoellick	May 20, 1991	August 23, 1992	George H. W. Bush
13	Joan E. Spero	April 1, 1993	February 24, 1997	Bill Clinton

=== Economic, business, and agricultural affairs (1994–2011) ===
The office of Under Secretary of State for Economic and Agricultural Affairs was renamed the under secretary of state for economic, business, and agricultural affairs on May 12, 1994.

#	Name	Assumed office	Left office	President served under
13	Joan E. Spero	April 1, 1993	February 24, 1997	Bill Clinton
14	Stuart E. Eizenstat	June 6, 1997	July 16, 1999	Bill Clinton
15	Alan P. Larson	November 24, 1999	February 25, 2005	Bill Clinton and George W. Bush
16	Josette Sheeran	August 23, 2005	April 4, 2007	George W. Bush
17	Reuben Jeffery III	June 27, 2007	January 20, 2009	George W. Bush
18	Robert Hormats	September 23, 2009	July 31, 2013	Barack Obama

=== Economic growth, energy, and the environment (2011–2025) ===
The office of Under Secretary of State for Economic, Business, and Agricultural Affairs was renamed the under secretary of state for economic growth, energy, and the environment on December 8, 2011.

#	Name	Assumed office	Left office	President served under
18	Robert Hormats	September 23, 2009	July 31, 2013	Barack Obama
19	Catherine A. Novelli	April 22, 2014	January 20, 2017	Barack Obama
-	Manisha Singh (Acting)	September 28, 2018	June 20, 2019	Donald Trump
20	Keith J. Krach	June 21, 2019	January 20, 2021	Donald Trump
-	Marcia Bernicat (Acting)	January 20, 2021	August 5, 2021	Joe Biden
21	Jose W. Fernandez	August 6, 2021	January 20, 2025	Joe Biden
-	Thomas E. Lertsen (Acting)	January 20, 2025	October 16, 2025	Donald Trump

=== Economic affairs (2025–present) ===
#	Name	Assumed office	Left office	President served under
22	Jacob Helberg	October 16, 2025	Present	Donald Trump
