= Walter Shaub =

American attorney and government official (born 1971)

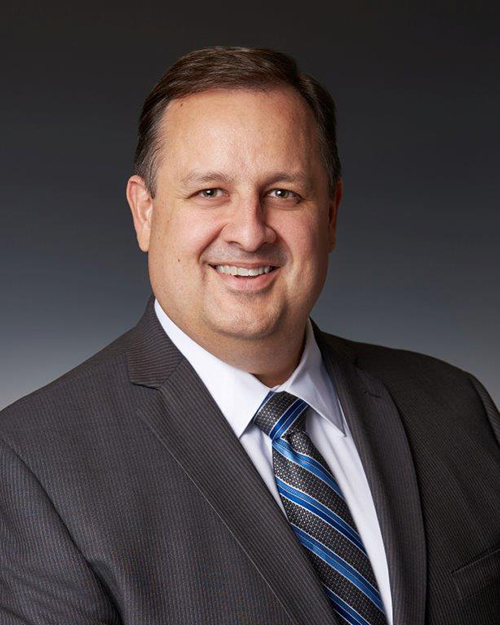

Director of the United States Office of Government Ethics
- In office January 9, 2013 – July 19, 2017
- President: Barack Obama; Donald Trump
- Preceded by: Don Fox (Acting)
- Succeeded by: David J. Apol (Acting)

Personal details
- Born: Walter Michael Shaub Jr. Virginia, U.S.
- Education: James Madison University (BA); American University (JD)

Walter Michael Shaub Jr. (born February 20, 1971) is an American attorney specializing in government ethics who, from January 9, 2013 to July 19, 2017, was the director of the United States Office of Government Ethics. Since leaving his government position in 2017, Shaub has continued working on ethics and accountability issues including roles at non profit organizations.

== Career ==
=== Early career ===
Shaub graduated from South Lakes High School in Reston, Virginia. He earned a B.A. degree in history from James Madison University, then earned his J.D. degree from American University Washington College of Law. From 1997 to 2004 he was an attorney in federal agencies including the Office of Government Ethics, the main office of the United States Department of Veterans Affairs, the Office of General Counsel of the United States Department of Health and Human Services, and the United States Department of Veterans Affairs Baltimore–Washington Regional Counsel's office. In 2004, he became an attorney at the Shaw, Bransford, Veilleux and Roth law firm.

=== Office of Government Ethics ===
In 2006, Shaub joined the Office of Government Ethics to become the attorney in charge of the Presidential nomination program. He held this position for two years before becoming the Deputy General Counsel in 2008. In 2013, he was appointed by President Barack Obama to a five-year term as the director of the Office of Government Ethics.

As Director, Shaub was outspoken with concerns about the first Trump administration during the transition period before he took office. He delivered a speech on January 11, 2017 regarding concerns with the president-elect Donald Trump's refusal to divest his assets and, instead, place them in trust managed by his sons. Shaub was also the author of a series of tweets published on the Office of Government Ethics Twitter account, which gained media attention for breaking from the account's typically serious tone to mimic Trump's tweeting style and congratulate him on his announcement that he would divest himself of his business assets.

On April 28, 2017, Shaub issued a data call directing the White House, agency ethics officials, Inspectors General, and the White House to produce copies of the ethics waivers given to ex-lobbyists in the executive branch. Writing on behalf of the administration on May 17, 2017, Office of Management and Budget Director Mick Mulvaney sent Shaub a letter that seemed to question OGE's authority to collect the requested ethics records. Mulvaney sent copies of his letter to every General Counsel and every designated agency ethics official in the executive branch.

On May 22, Shaub responded by sending a ten-page letter reasserting OGE's authority to collect ethics records, including ethics waivers, to Mulvaney, Shaub copied the same individuals Mulvaney had copied and added the inspectors general, as well as the six members of Congress responsible for government oversight, On May 26, Mulvaney sent a second letter denying that his first letter had questioned OGE's authority and, this time, providing the information requested by Shaub's original data call. Thereafter, on May 30, the White House complied with Shaub's data call by posting its waivers online. On August 1, Senators Chuck Grassley, Dianne Feinstein and Gary Peters sent a bipartisan letter to Mulvaney demanding that the White House continue releasing its waivers on a continuing basis. On September 21, OGE's acting Director, David Apol, issued a memorandum declaring that the White House would comply with this congressional request. On October 19, the White House released a second batch of waivers on its website.

On July 6, 2017, Walter Shaub submitted his resignation, effective July 19, 2017, saying that ethics rules should be tighter.

=== Post-government work ===
In July 2017 Shaub joined the Campaign Legal Center (CLC), a nonpartisan organization of election-law experts located in Washington DC, as senior director, ethics. In that position Shaub said of the United States and the Trump administration, "[we] are pretty close to a laughingstock at this point." In an interview with Judy Woodruff of PBS, Shaub was highly critical of the Trump Administration. He described, "the White House that has set a tone from the top that ethics doesn't matter." He was highly critical of naming an acting director, to avoid the Senate confirmation process.

Shaub was concerned that, under Trump, the United States government would be seen as a kleptocracy. Shaub maintains that Trump uses his hotels and other properties for government business, which Shaub maintains amounts to free advertising. Shaub said, "His actions create the appearance of profiting from the presidency, and the appearance here is everything, because the demand I'm making is so much more than 'have a clean heart'. It's: 'Have a clean heart and act appropriately,'"

Shaub vocally supported the need for the investigation into Russian meddling in the U.S. elections to remain independent of White House interference by President Trump and his associates. On December 15, 2017, Shaub issued a warning to Trump, saying that "firing Mueller is a red line he must not cross."

On February 16, 2021, the nonprofit Project On Government Oversight (POGO) announced that Shaub would be joining the watchdog organization, leading a new Ethics and Accountability Initiative. "I’m excited to join POGO and get to work crafting and promoting effective ethics reforms that will help ensure the health of our democratic system and restore government integrity," Schaub said in a press release from POGO. According to the press release, "Shaub and POGO will advocate for reforms like robust executive branch ethics laws, stricter limits on the use of emergency powers and the Office of Legal Counsel, and stronger congressional oversight powers."

Political offices
Preceded by Don Fox (Acting)	Director of the United States Office of Government Ethics; 2013–2017	Succeeded by David J. Apol (Acting)
