= Carl Strom =

Carl Strom may refer to:

- Carl Ström (1888–1957), Swedish film actor
- Carl W. Strom (1899–1969), American diplomat

== See also ==
- Karl Strom (born 1966), American surgeon
