= List of ambassadors of the United States to North Yemen =

Ambassador of the United States to North Yemen
- Seal of the United States Department of State
- Nominator: The president of the United States
- Inaugural holder: J. Rives Childs as Envoy Extraordinary and Minister Plenipotentiary
- Formation: August 22, 1946
- Final holder: Charles Franklin Dunbar
- Abolished: June 13, 1991

North Yemen

The United States recognized the Mutawakkilite Kingdom of Yemen in 1946 and commissioned its first ambassador, J. Rives Childs to the Kingdom of Yemen on August 22, 1946. A diplomatic legation was established in Ta'izz. At that time the ambassador to Saudi Arabia was concurrently commissioned to Yemen while resident in Jeddah, Saudi Arabia.

Following a coup d'état in North Yemen in 1962, the nation was renamed Yemen Arab Republic. A period of civil war ensued for the next five years. The United States maintained diplomatic relations with the Kingdom but no ambassador was accredited to the nation. A series of chargés d'affaires maintained the legation during that period. Also during that time, the legation in Ta'izz was raised to embassy status on January 28, 1963 and the embassy was transferred to San'a in 1966.

The Yemen Arab Republic severed relations with the United States June 7, 1967. A U.S. Interests Section was established in the Italian Embassy on April 10, 1970. The embassy in San'a was re-established on July 1, 1972. The first Ambassador Extraordinary and Plenipotentiary, William R. Crawford, Jr., was appointed on October 12, 1972.

On May 22, 1990, the Yemen Arab Republic and the People's Democratic Republic of Yemen (South Yemen) announced that they were forming a united Republic of Yemen.

For subsequent ambassadors to the Republic of Yemen, see United States Ambassador to Yemen.

For ambassadors to South Yemen, see United States Ambassador to South Yemen.

== Ambassadors ==
- Note: Until 1963 the embassy had the status of legation rather than embassy and the title of the ambassador was Envoy Extraordinary and Minister Plenipotentiary.
- Note: Until 1957 the envoy was concurrently commissioned to the Kingdom of Yemen and Saudi Arabia, while resident at Jeddah.
- J. Rives Childs – Career FSO
  - Title: Envoy Extraordinary and Minister Plenipotentiary
  - Appointed: August 22, 1946
  - Presented credentials: September 30, 1946
  - Terminated mission: Left Jeddah, July 21, 1950
- Raymond A. Hare – Career FSO
  - Title: Envoy Extraordinary and Minister Plenipotentiary
  - Appointed: September 20, 1950
  - Presented credentials: July 22, 1951
  - Terminated mission: Left Jeddah, July 8, 1953
- George Wadsworth – Career FSO
  - Title: Envoy Extraordinary and Minister Plenipotentiary
  - Appointed: October 21, 1953
  - Presented credentials: September 13, 1954
  - Terminated mission: Left Jeddah, January 1, 1958
- Note: In 1957 or 1958 (records unclear), the U.S. ambassador to Egypt was concurrently commissioned to Yemen while resident at Cairo.
- Donald R. Heath – Career FSO
  - Title: Envoy Extraordinary and Minister Plenipotentiary
  - Appointed: November 27, 1957
  - Presented credentials: —
  - Terminated mission: —
- Raymond A. Hare – Career FSO
  - Title: Envoy Extraordinary and Minister Plenipotentiary
  - Appointed: February 16, 1959
  - Presented credentials: March 11, 1959
  - Terminated mission: Left Cairo, December 18, 1959
- G. Frederick Reinhardt – Career FSO
  - Title: Envoy Extraordinary and Minister Plenipotentiary
  - Appointed: January 27, 1960
  - Presented credentials: April 28, 1960
  - Terminated mission: Left Cairo, May 6, 1961
- Parker T. Hart – Career FSO
  - Title: Envoy Extraordinary and Minister Plenipotentiary
  - Appointed: May 20, 1961
  - Presented credentials: October 1, 1961
  - Terminated mission: Appointment terminated, September 27, 1962
- Notes:
  - In 1962–1967 during a period of civil war in North Yemen, there was no ambassador or envoy commissioned to the Yemen Arab Republic. The Chargés d'Affaires ad interim 1962–1967 were:
    - Robert Stookey (1963)
    - James N. Cortada (February 1963–August 1964)
    - Lee Dinsmore (August 1964–June 1967)
  - The U.S. Legation was raised to embassy status on January 28, 1963.
  - The embassy was moved to San'a in 1966.
  - The Yemen Arab Republic severed diplomatic relations with the United States June 7, 1967 and all U.S. diplomatic personnel were withdrawn.
  - A U.S. Interest Section was established in the Italian Embassy on April 10, 1970. Principal Officers were David W. McClintock (April 1970–February 1972) and Robert A. Stein (February–July 1972).
  - The embassy in San'a was re-established on July 1, 1972, with Robert A. Stein as Chargé d'Affaires ad interim.
  - From 1972 the ambassador had the rank of Ambassador Extraordinary and Plenipotentiary and was commissioned to the Yemen Arab Republic.
- William R. Crawford Jr. – Career FSO
  - Title: Ambassador Extraordinary and Plenipotentiary
  - Appointed: October 12, 1972
  - Presented credentials: December 19, 1972
  - Terminated mission: Left post July 6, 1974
- Thomas J. Scotes – Career FSO
  - Title: Ambassador Extraordinary and Plenipotentiary
  - Appointed: December 20, 1974
  - Presented credentials: January 21, 1975
  - Terminated mission: Left post April 24, 1978
- George M. Lane – Career FSO
  - Title: Ambassador Extraordinary and Plenipotentiary
  - Appointed: August 11, 1978
  - Presented credentials: October 5, 1978
  - Terminated mission: Left post July 4, 1981
- David E. Zweifel – Career FSO
  - Title: Ambassador Extraordinary and Plenipotentiary
  - Appointed: September 28, 1981
  - Presented credentials: October 24, 1981
  - Terminated mission: Left post June 20, 1984
- William Arthur Rugh – Career FSO
  - Title: Ambassador Extraordinary and Plenipotentiary
  - Appointed: September 21, 1984
  - Presented credentials: October 28, 1984
  - Terminated mission: Left post July 4, 1987
- Note: The post was vacant July 1987–August 1988. Theodore H. Kattouf served as Chargé d'Affaires ad interim in that interval.
- Charles Franklin Dunbar – Career FSO
  - Title: Ambassador Extraordinary and Plenipotentiary
  - Appointed: June 16, 1988
  - Presented credentials: August 14, 1988
  - Terminated mission: Left post June 13, 1991

On May 22, 1990, the Yemen Arab Republic and the People's Democratic Republic of Yemen united to form the "Republic of Yemen." For ambassadors to the Republic of Yemen, see United States Ambassador to Yemen.

== See also ==
- Yemen Arab Republic
- History of Yemen
