= Ambassador Crowley =

Ambassador Crowley may refer to:

- Monica Crowley (born 1968), 35th Chief of Protocol of the United States (2025–present)
- Shawn P. Crowley, United States Ambassador to Italy (2022–2023, 2025) and the Netherlands (2016–2018)
