= Zweifel =

Zweifel is a German surname. Notable people with the surname include:

- Albert Zweifel (born 1949), former professional cyclo-cross cyclist
- Clint Zweifel (born 1973), American politician from Missouri
- David E. Zweifel (1934–2022), American diplomat
- Paul Zweifel (1848–1927), German gynaecologist and physiologist
- Richard G. Zweifel (1926–2019), American herpetologist
  - Zweifel's frog (Rana zweifeli)
