= Parker T. Hart =

American diplomat (1910-1997)

9th United States Ambassador to Saudi Arabia
- In office July 22, 1961 – May 29, 1965
- President: John F. Kennedy; Lyndon B. Johnson
- Preceded by: Donald R. Heath
- Succeeded by: Hermann F. Eilts

7th United States Ambassador to North Yemen
- In office October 1, 1961 – September 27, 1962
- President: John F. Kennedy
- Preceded by: G. Frederick Reinhardt
- Succeeded by: Robert Stookey (Acting)

1st United States Ambassador to Kuwait
- In office 1962–1963
- President: John F. Kennedy
- Preceded by: Dayton S. Mak (Acting)
- Succeeded by: Howard R. Cottam

39th United States Ambassador to Turkey
- In office October 11, 1965 – October 3, 1968
- President: Lyndon B. Johnson
- Preceded by: Raymond A. Hare
- Succeeded by: Robert Komer

9th Assistant Secretary of State for Near Eastern and South Asian Affairs
- In office October 14, 1968 – February 4, 1969
- President: Lyndon B. Johnson; Richard Nixon
- Preceded by: Lucius D. Battle
- Succeeded by: Joseph J. Sisco

Personal details
- Born: Parker Thompson Hart; September 28, 1910 Medford, Massachusetts, U.S.
- Died: October 15, 1997 (aged 87) Washington D.C., U.S.
- Education: Dartmouth College (1933, B.A.); Harvard University (1935, M.A.); Graduate Institute of International Studies (1936); Edmund A. Walsh School of Foreign Service (1936)
- Nickname: "Pete"

Parker Thompson "Pete" Hart (September 28, 1910 – October 15, 1997) was a United States diplomat.

== Biography ==
Parker T. Hart was born in Medford, Massachusetts on September 28, 1910. He received a BA from Dartmouth College in 1933, an MA from Harvard University in 1935, and a diploma from the Graduate Institute of International Studies in Geneva in 1936. He attended the Edmund A. Walsh School of Foreign Service in 1936.

After completing his studies, Hart joined the United States Foreign Service. His first posting was in Vienna in 1938, the year of the Anschluss. He was posted to Brazil from 1942 to 1949. In 1949, Hart opened the U.S. consulate in Dhahran, the site of Saudi Arabia's newly discovered oilfields. Hart was posted to Washington, D.C., in 1952, as Director of the Office of Near East Affairs. He returned to the field in 1955 as Deputy Chief of Mission in Cairo. He was briefly consul general in Damascus in 1958. Later in 1958, he returned to the U.S. to serve as Deputy Assistant Secretary of State for Near East and South Asian Affairs.

In 1961, President of the United States John F. Kennedy named Hart United States Ambassador to Saudi Arabia. Ambassador Hart presented his credentials on July 22, 1961, and served there until his credentials were terminated on May 29, 1965. He was concurrently United States Ambassador to North Yemen from October 1, 1961, to September 27, 1962, and the first United States Ambassador to Kuwait from 1962 to 1963. From 1965 to 1968, Ambassador Hart was United States Ambassador to Turkey; in this capacity he negotiated a settlement that prevented war between two NATO allies, Greece and Turkey, over Cyprus.

President Lyndon B. Johnson nominated Hart as Assistant Secretary of State for Near Eastern and South Asian Affairs in 1965 and Hart held this office from October 14, 1968, until February 4, 1969. He was the first assistant secretary capable of speaking the Arabic language. He was replaced when Richard Nixon took power and National Security Advisor Henry Kissinger moved U.S. foreign policy in the region in a more pro-Israel direction. Hart then spent several months as Director of the Foreign Service Institute, before resigning from the United States Department of State later in 1969.

Hart served as President of the Middle East Institute from 1969 to 1973. He then worked as a special representative and consultant for Bechtel from 1973 to 1990. He retired in 1990 and would go on to publish two books of memoirs

In retirement, Hart lived in Washington, D.C., where he died on October 15, 1997. He was 87 years old.

== Selected publications ==
- Two NATO Allies at the Threshold of War: Cyprus, A Firsthand Account of Crisis Management, 1965–1968. Durham: Duke University Press. 1990. ISBN 0-8223-0977-7.
- Saudi Arabia and the United States: Birth of a Security Partnership. Bloomington: Indiana University Press. 1998. ISBN 0-253-33460-8.

== Papers ==
Additional material about Parker T. Hart can be found in the University of Wyoming American Heritage Center's archives. The archives include correspondences, reports, speeches, and subject files about development of business possibilities in, and the political climate of, the Middle East for his consulting work with the Bechtel Corporation, as well as RCA, U.S. Steel, and IBM. There is a small amount of correspondence related to the Arab boycott of Egypt. Hart's consultation services concerning General Motors’ Saudi Arabian petition to the Saudi government for reimbursement of expenses incurred in connection with its vehicle assembly program are documented, and there is background information on Prince Talal, son of the founding King of Saudi Arabia, which Hart provided to the Santa Fe International Corporation.

Diplomatic posts
Preceded by Donald R. Heath	United States Ambassador to Saudi Arabia; July 22, 1961 – May 29, 1965	Succeeded by Hermann Eilts
Preceded by G. Frederick Reinhardt	United States Ambassador to North Yemen; October 1, 1961 – September 27, 1962	Succeeded by Position Unfilled Until 1971
Preceded by Dayton S. Mak (Chargé d'Affaires)	United States Ambassador to Kuwait; 1962–1963	Succeeded by Howard R. Cottam
Preceded by Raymond A. Hare	United States Ambassador to Turkey; 1965–1968	Succeeded by Robert Komer
Government offices
Preceded by Lucius D. Battle	Assistant Secretary of State for Near Eastern and South Asian Affairs; October 14, 1968 – February 4, 1969	Succeeded by Joseph J. Sisco
