= List of ambassadors of the United States to Italy =

Ambassador of the United States to Italy
- Ambasciatore degli Stati Uniti d'America in Italia
- Seal of the United States Department of State

- Flag of a United States ambassador

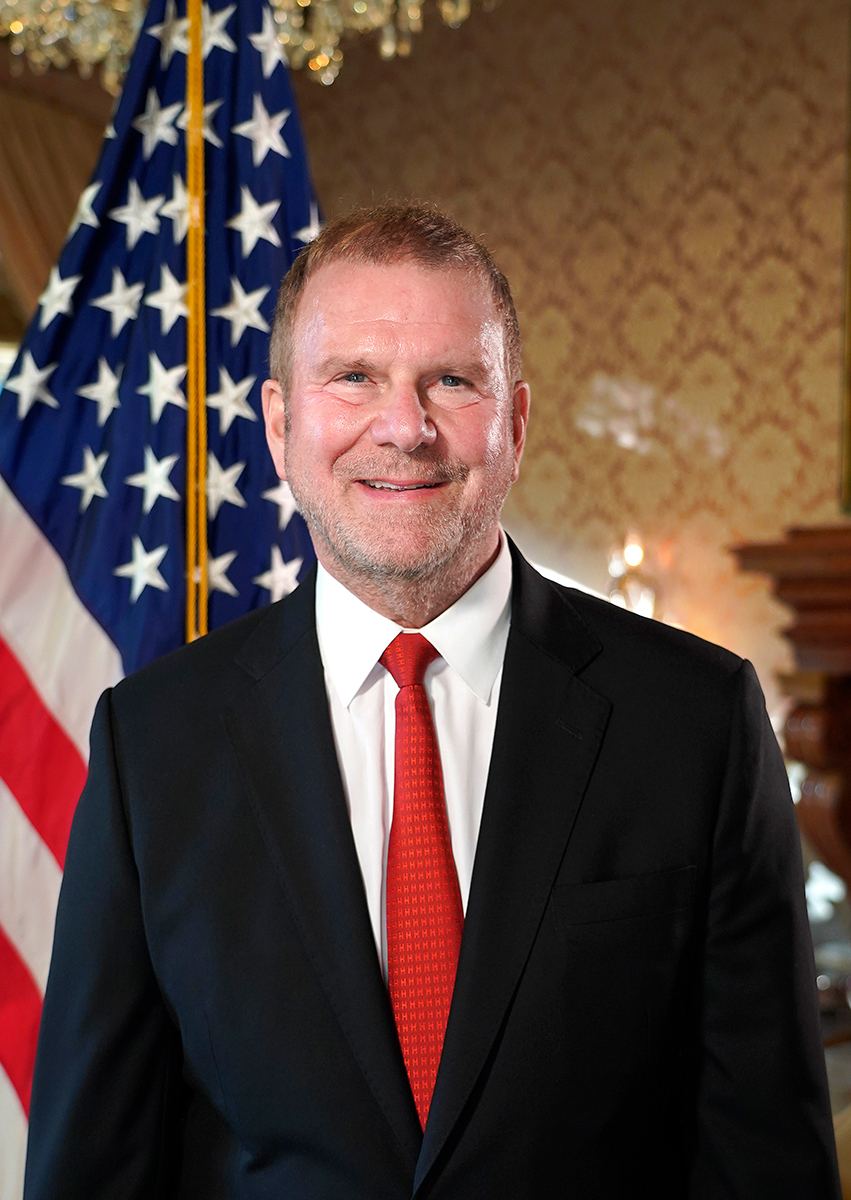
- Incumbent; Tilman Fertitta since May 6, 2025
- Residence: Villa Taverna, Rome
- Nominator: The president of the United States
- Appointer: The president with Senate advice and consent
- Inaugural holder: John Nelson as Chargé d'Affaires
- Formation: October 24, 1831
- Website: U.S. Embassy – Rome

Since 1840, the United States has had diplomatic representation in the Italian Republic and its predecessor nations, the Kingdom of Sardinia and then the Kingdom of Italy, with a break in relations from 1941 to 1944 while Italy and the U.S. were at war during World War II. The U.S. Mission to Italy is headed by the Embassy of the United States in Rome, and also includes six consular offices.

Beginning in 2006, the U.S. ambassador to Italy is concurrently accredited as the U.S. ambassador to San Marino.

== List of U.S. ambassadors to Italy ==
Listed below are the head U.S. diplomatic agents in Italy, their diplomatic rank, and the effective start and end of their service in Italy.

Heads of the U.S. Legation at Naples (1831–1860) to the Kingdom of the Two Sicilies
Name and title	Presentation of credentials	Termination of mission
John Nelson, Chargé d'Affaires	October 24, 1831	October 15, 1832
Enos T. Throop, Chargé d'Affaires	September 28, 1838	December 29, 1841
William Boulware, Chargé d'Affaires	December 29, 1841	June 24, 1845
William Hawkins Polk, Chargé d'Affaires	July 24, 1845	May 11, 1847
John Rowan, Chargé d'Affaires	June 27, 1848	November 9, 1849
Edward Joy Morris, Chargé d'Affaires	April 4, 1850	August 25, 1853
Robert Dale Owen, Minister Resident	October 22, 1853	September 20, 1858
Joseph Ripley Chandler, Minister Resident	September 20, 1858	November 6, 1860

The Embassy at Naples closed November 6, 1860.

Heads of the U.S. Legation at Turin (1840–1865)
Name and title	Presentation of credentials	Termination of mission
Hezekiah Gold Rogers, Chargé d'Affaires	September 15, 1840	November 22, 1841
Ambrose Baber, Chargé d'Affaires	December 1, 1841	January 10, 1844
Robert Wickliffe, Jr., Chargé d'Affaires	January 10, 1844	1847
Nathaniel Niles, Chargé d'Affaires	April 28, 1848	August 20, 1850
William B. Kinney, Chargé d'Affaires	August 21, 1850	October 8, 1853
John Moncure Daniel, Chargé d'Affaires	October 10, 1853	September 3, 1854
John Moncure Daniel, Minister	September 4, 1854	January 10, 1861
George P. Marsh, Envoy	June 23, 1861	1865

Heads of the U.S. Legation at Florence (1865–1871)
Name and title	Presentation of credentials	Termination of mission
George P. Marsh, Envoy	1865	1871

Heads of the U.S. Legation at Rome (1871–1894)
Name and title	Presentation of credentials	Termination of mission
George P. Marsh, Envoy	1871	July 23, 1882
William Waldorf Astor, Envoy	November 21, 1882	March 1, 1885
John B. Stallo, Envoy	November 27, 1885	June 6, 1889
Albert G. Porter, Envoy	June 6, 1889	July 9, 1892
William Potter, Envoy	December 28, 1892	March 8, 1894

Heads of the U.S. Embassy in Rome (1894–1941)
Name and title	Presentation of credentials	Termination of mission
Wayne MacVeagh, Ambassador	March 11, 1894	March 4, 1897
William F. Draper, Ambassador	June 29, 1897	June 5, 1900
George V. L. Meyer, Ambassador	February 4, 1901	April 1, 1905
Henry White, Ambassador	April 16, 1905	February 26, 1907
Lloyd C. Griscom, Ambassador	March 17, 1907	June 14, 1909
John G. A. Leishman, Ambassador	July 4, 1909	October 7, 1911
Thomas J. O'Brien, Ambassador	November 13, 1911	September 17, 1913
Thomas Nelson Page, Ambassador	October 12, 1913	June 21, 1919
Robert Underwood Johnson, Ambassador	April 22, 1920	May 20, 1921
Richard Washburn Child, Ambassador	July 28, 1921	January 20, 1924
Henry P. Fletcher, Ambassador	April 2, 1924	August 3, 1929
John W. Garrett, Ambassador	November 20, 1929	May 22, 1933
Breckinridge Long, Ambassador	May 31, 1933	April 23, 1936
William Phillips, Ambassador	November 4, 1936	October 6, 1941
George Wadsworth, Chargé d'Affaires	October 6, 1941	December 11, 1941

Diplomatic relations were severed and the U.S. Embassy in Rome was closed on December 11, 1941, after Italy declared war on the United States. Diplomatic relations were reestablished on October 16, 1944. Ambassador Alexander C. Kirk reopened the U.S. Embassy in Rome when he presented his credentials on January 8, 1945.

Heads of the U.S. Embassy in Rome (1945–present)
Name and title	Presentation of credentials	Termination of mission
Alexander C. Kirk, Ambassador	January 8, 1945	March 5, 1946
James Clement Dunn, Ambassador	February 6, 1947	March 17, 1952
Ellsworth Bunker, Ambassador	May 7, 1952	April 3, 1953
Clare Boothe Luce, Ambassador	May 4, 1953	December 27, 1956
James David Zellerbach, Ambassador	February 6, 1957	December 10, 1960
G. Frederick Reinhardt, Ambassador	May 17, 1961	March 3, 1968
H. Gardner Ackley, Ambassador	April 3, 1968	August 27, 1969
Graham A. Martin, Ambassador	October 30, 1969	February 10, 1973
John A. Volpe, Ambassador	March 6, 1973	January 24, 1977
Richard N. Gardner, Ambassador	March 21, 1977	February 27, 1981
Maxwell M. Rabb, Ambassador	July 1, 1981	June 3, 1989
Peter F. Secchia, Ambassador	July 3, 1989	January 20, 1993
Reginald Bartholomew, Ambassador	October 14, 1993	September 28, 1997
Thomas M. Foglietta, Ambassador	December 11, 1997	March 1, 2001
Melvin Floyd Sembler, Ambassador	December 10, 2001	July 26, 2005
Ronald P. Spogli, Ambassador	August 12, 2005	February 6, 2009
David H. Thorne, Ambassador	September 4, 2009	July 30, 2013
John R. Phillips, Ambassador	September 13, 2013	January 18, 2017
Kelly C. Degnan, Chargé d'Affaires	January 18, 2017	October 1, 2017
Lewis Eisenberg, Ambassador	October 4, 2017	January 4, 2021
Thomas D. Smitham, Chargé d'Affaires	January 4, 2021	July 15, 2022
Shawn P. Crowley, Chargé d'Affaires	July 18, 2022	August 26, 2023
Jack Markell, Ambassador	September 23, 2023	January 11, 2025
Shawn P. Crowley, Chargé d'Affaires	January 11, 2025	May 5, 2025
Tilman J. Fertitta, Ambassador	May 6, 2025	Incumbent

== See also ==
- Italian Embassy, Washington, D.C.
- Embassy of the United States, Rome
- Italy – United States relations
- Foreign relations of Italy
- Ambassadors of the United States
- List of ambassadors of Italy to the United States
