= J. Rives Childs =

American diplomat and writer (1893–1987)

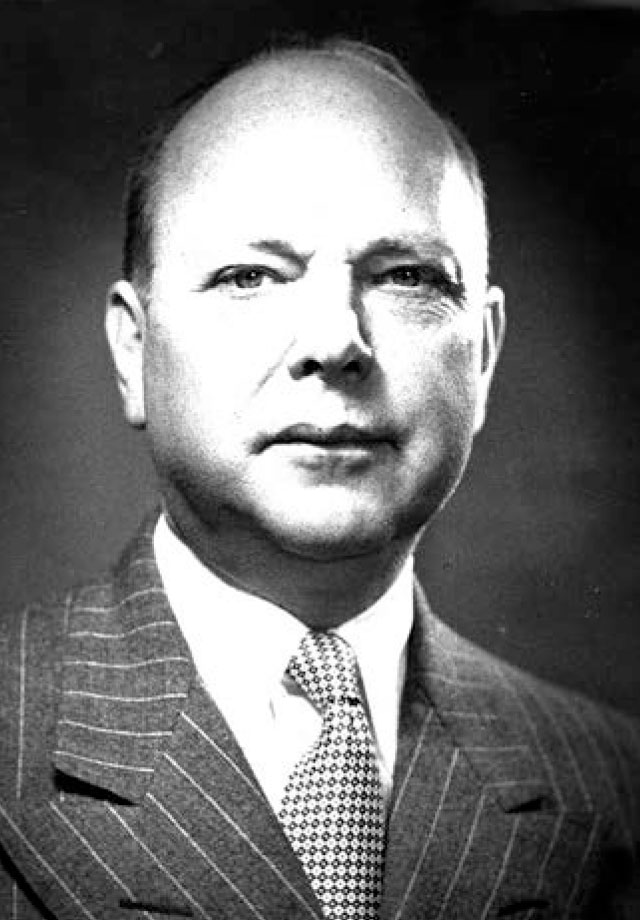
James Rives Childs

James Rives Childs (February 6, 1893 – July 15, 1987) was an American diplomat, a writer and an authority on Giacomo Casanova.

== Early life and education ==
Childs was born in Lynchburg, Virginia. He attended the Virginia Military Institute from 1909 to 1911 and graduated from Randolph-Macon College in 1912. Childs obtained a master's degree from Harvard University in 1915. Later, Childs joined the United States Army and worked with British and French forces as a radio intelligence liaison in World War I. He received the Medal of Freedom for his service. After the war, Childs worked with the American Relief Administration in the Soviet Union.

== Diplomatic career ==
Childs joined the United States Foreign Service in 1923. He was the Chargé d'Affaires of Morocco from 1941 to 1945. He served as United States Ambassador to Saudi Arabia from 1946 to 1950 and held a concurrent post as Ambassador to North Yemen. In 1951, Childs was named Ambassador to Ethiopia. He retired two years later. In 1987, Childs died in Richmond, Virginia, of a cardiac pulmonary infection, aged 94.

== Writer ==
Childs wrote 14 books, five of them on the subject of Giacomo Casanova, the 18th-century Venetian adventurer and libertine. His authoritative biography of Casanova was published posthumously in 1988.

Diplomatic posts
Preceded by post created	United States Ambassador to Saudi Arabia; 1949–1950	Succeeded by Raymond A. Hare
Preceded by George R. Merrell	United States Ambassador to Ethiopia; 1951–1953	Succeeded by Joseph Simonson
