= Frederick Nolting =

American diplomat

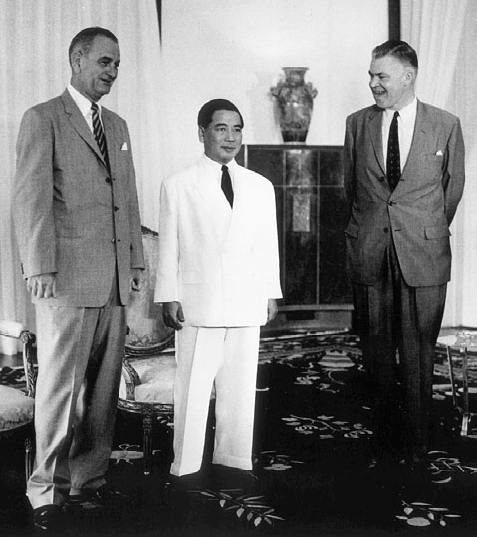
- US Vice President Lyndon B. Johnson, RVN President Ngo Dinh Diem and Frederick Nolting in South Vietnam's Presidential Palace in 1961

United States Ambassador to South Vietnam
- In office May 10, 1961 – August 15, 1963
- President: John F. Kennedy
- Preceded by: Elbridge Durbrow
- Succeeded by: Henry Cabot Lodge Jr.

Personal details
- Born: August 24, 1911 Richmond, Virginia, U.S.
- Died: December 14, 1989 (aged 78) Charlottesville, Virginia, U.S.

Frederick Ernest Nolting Jr. (August 24, 1911 – December 14, 1989) was a United States diplomat who served as United States Ambassador to South Vietnam from 1961 to 1963.

== Early life and education ==
Nolting was born in Richmond, Virginia to Frederick Ernst Nolting Sr. and his wife, the former Mary Buford. Nolting Jr. graduated from the University of Virginia in 1933, where he was a member of the Virginia Glee Club and the Washington Literary Society and Debating Union, with a BA in history. He then received a master's degree from Harvard University in 1941 and his Ph.D. from the University of Virginia. He served in the United States Navy during World War II.

== Career ==
Nolting joined the State Department in 1946, where he acted as special assistant to Secretary of State John Foster Dulles for mutual security affairs. He was appointed as a member of the United States delegation to the North Atlantic Treaty Organization (NATO) in 1955.

In 1957 he was appointed by President Dwight D. Eisenhower as alternate permanent representative to NATO, and in 1961 he was appointed by President John F. Kennedy as United States Ambassador to South Vietnam.

Following his government service, Nolting went to work for Morgan Guaranty Trust Company, and in 1970 joined the faculty of the University of Virginia and became founding director of the Miller Center of Public Affairs.

In 1988 he published his memoir From Trust to Tragedy: The Political Memoirs of Frederick Nolting, Kennedy's Ambassador to Diem's Vietnam.

== Personal life ==
Nolting married Olivia Lindsay Crumpler in 1940. They had four children – Molly, Jane, Grace and Frances. In 1946, he purchased "Sully", the former estate home of Richard Bland Lee, first Congressman from Northern Virginia, built in 1794. He was the last private owner of that estate.

== Death ==
Nolting died on December 14, 1989, aged 78, in Charlottesville, Virginia. He was buried at St. Paul's Churchyard, Ivy, Albemarle County, Virginia.

== See also ==
- Rufus Phillips § Krulak-Mendenhall mission

Diplomatic posts
Preceded by Elbridge Durbrow	U.S. Ambassador to South Vietnam; 1961–1963	Succeeded by Henry Cabot Lodge Jr.
