= Robert M. McClintock =

American diplomat

Robert McClintock
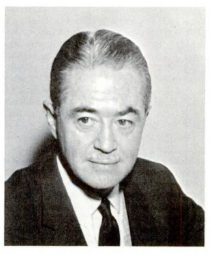

US Ambassador to Cambodia
- In office August 18, 1954 – October 15, 1956
- President: Dwight D. Eisenhower
- Preceded by: Donald R. Heath
- Succeeded by: Carl W. Strom

US Ambassador to Lebanon
- In office 1957–1961
- President: Dwight D. Eisenhower
- Preceded by: Donald R. Heath
- Succeeded by: Armin H. Meyer

35th United States Ambassador to Argentina
- In office February 6, 1962 – May 10, 1964
- President: John F. Kennedy; Lyndon B. Johnson
- Preceded by: Roy R. Rubottom, Jr.
- Succeeded by: Edwin M. Martin

US Ambassador to Venezuela
- In office July 7, 1970 – March 14, 1975
- President: Richard Nixon; Gerald Ford
- Preceded by: Maurice M. Bernbaum
- Succeeded by: Harry W. Shlaudeman

Personal details
- Born: August 30, 1909 Seattle, Washington, U.S.
- Died: November 1, 1976 (aged 67) Beaune, France
- Education: Stanford University

Robert M. McClintock (August 30, 1909 – November 1, 1976) was an American diplomat. A career Foreign Service officer, he served as the U.S. ambassador to Cambodia (1954–1956), Lebanon (1957–1961), Argentina (1962–1964), and Venezuela (1970–1975).

McClintock was born in Seattle, Washington, on August 30, 1909. He joined the Foreign Service in 1931 after graduating from Stanford University. Other positions include advisor to the president of the Naval War College (1964 to 1966) and deputy director Special State-Defense Study Group beginning in 1968.

McClintock died of injuries sustained in a car crash in Beaune, France, on November 1, 1976. He was 67 years old.

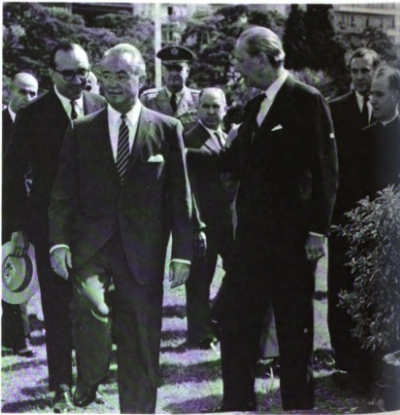
McClintock (foreground) in Argentina in 1963

== Venezuela and oil ==
Venezuela was the largest supplier of oil to the US, in 1974. In 1975, they were taking steps to nationalize the industry. He took his concerns to the American Government, fearful “Venezuela could play one American oil company off against another. ... McClintock reportedly wanted the United States Government to take on a major and direct role in negotiations concerning prices, levels of production and the share that would be channelled through American companies to the United States market.”
