= Gardner Ackley =

American economist and diplomat (1915-1998)

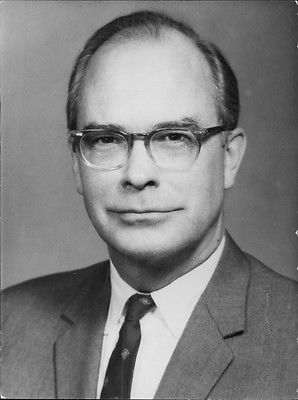

United States Ambassador to Italy
- In office April 3, 1968 – August 27, 1969
- President: Lyndon Johnson; Richard Nixon
- Preceded by: Fred Reinhardt
- Succeeded by: Graham Martin

6th Chair of the Council of Economic Advisers
- In office November 16, 1964 – February 15, 1968
- President: Lyndon Johnson
- Preceded by: Walter Heller
- Succeeded by: Art Okun

Personal details
- Born: June 30, 1915 Indianapolis, Indiana, U.S.
- Died: February 12, 1998 (aged 82) Ann Arbor, Michigan, U.S.
- Party: Democratic
- Education: Western Michigan University (BA); University of Michigan, Ann Arbor (MA, PhD)

Hugh Gardner Ackley (June 30, 1915 – February 12, 1998) was an American economist and diplomat.

Ackley served as a member of the Council of Economic Advisers under President John F. Kennedy, and as the chairman under President Lyndon B. Johnson from 1964 to 1968. He also served as ambassador to Italy from 1968 to 1969. Ackley was a member of the University of Michigan faculty for 43 years and served as chair of its economics department. Upon returning to the university following his ambassadorship, he was named the Henry Carter Adams Professor of Political Economy. In 1982 he served as president of the American Economic Association.

Ackley was born in Indianapolis, Indiana in 1915, and was raised in Kalamazoo, Michigan, where he attended public schools and graduated from Western Michigan University in 1936. He earned a Ph.D. from the University of Michigan in 1940, and joined the faculty that year. He served in the U.S. Office of Price Administration and the Office of Strategic Services in Washington, D.C., from 1941 to 1946 and as assistant director of the U.S. Office of Price Stabilization from 1951 to 1952.

Ackley believed that government had a definite role in fine tuning the economy, using both fiscal and monetary intervention. He warned President Johnson in 1966 that a tax increase was needed to finance the escalation of the war in Vietnam and the increased social welfare spending that Johnson was undertaking. Johnson did not ask for a tax increase, and economists, including Paul Samuelson, believed this was the cause of the inflation of the 1970s.

Ackley was the author of the popular graduate-level textbook Macroeconomic Theory, which was translated into several languages and remained the standard advanced text during the 1960s and early 1970s. He was awarded a fellowship from the American Academy of Arts and Sciences in 1968 and another fellowship from the Ford Foundation. He was elected to the American Philosophical Society in 1972.

Ackley has a dormitory hall at Western Michigan University named after him.

== Selected publications ==
- "Relative Prices and Aggregate Consumer Demand", with D.B. Suits, 1950, American Economic Review.
- "The Wealth-Saving Relationship", Journal of Political Economy, 1951.
- "Administered Prices and the Inflationary Process", American Economic Review, 1959.
- Macroeconomic Theory, Macmillan Company, 1961; republished as Macroeconomics: Theory and Policy, 1978.
- Stemming World Inflation, The Atlantic Institute, 1971.
- "An Incomes Policy for the 1970s", Review of Economics and Statistics, 1972.
- Macroeconomics: Theory and Policy, Macmillan Library Reference 1978.
- "The Costs of Inflation", American Economic Review, 1978.

Political offices
Preceded by Walter Heller	Chair of the Council of Economic Advisers; 1964–1968	Succeeded by Art Okun
Diplomatic posts
Preceded by Fred Reinhardt	United States Ambassador to Italy; 1968–1969	Succeeded by Graham Martin
