= George M. Lane (diplomat) =

American diplomat

George Mirick Lane (October 15, 1928 – June 7, 2016) was a career U.S. Foreign Service Officer and was the U.S. Ambassador to Yemen (1978–1981). Lane entered the Foreign Service in 1957 and served as an international relations officer at the State Department.

== Early life and education ==
Lane was born 15 October 1928, in Baltimore, Md. He graduated from Cornell University in 1951 and from Fletcher School of Law and Diplomacy in 1957. Lane served in the U.S. Army from 1951 to 1954. He was Deputy Director, then Acting Director of the Office of North African Affairs at the State Department.

== Career ==
- Officer at the State Department (1970–1972)
- International relations officer (1972–1973)
- Acting Director of the Office of North African Affairs at the State Department (1973–1974)
- Deputy Chief of Mission in Mbabane (1974–1976)
- Deputy Chief of Mission in Beirut (1976)
- U.S. Ambassador to Yemen (1978–1981)
