= Ellsworth Bunker =

American diplomat (1894–1984)

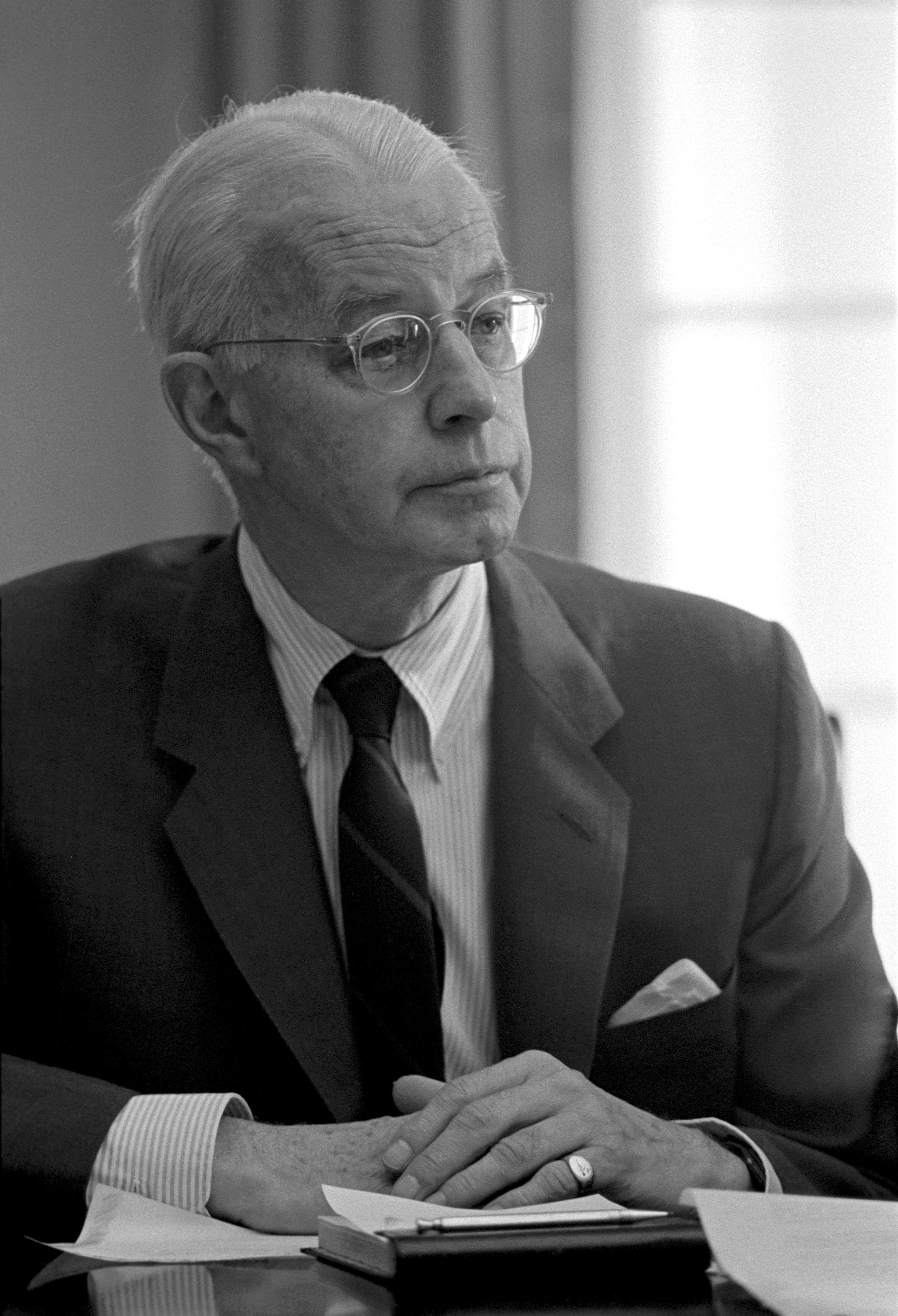
- Bunker in 1965

United States Ambassador to South Vietnam
- In office April 5, 1967 – May 11, 1973
- President: Lyndon Johnson; Richard Nixon
- Preceded by: Henry Cabot Lodge Jr.
- Succeeded by: Graham Martin

5th United States Ambassador to the Organization of American States
- In office January 29, 1964 – November 7, 1966
- President: Lyndon B. Johnson
- Preceded by: deLesseps Story Morrison
- Succeeded by: Sol Linowitz

United States Ambassador to India
- In office November 28, 1956 – March 23, 1961
- President: Dwight D. Eisenhower; John F. Kennedy
- Preceded by: John Sherman Cooper
- Succeeded by: John Kenneth Galbraith

United States Ambassador to Italy
- In office May 7, 1952 – April 3, 1953
- President: Harry S. Truman; Dwight D. Eisenhower
- Preceded by: James Clement Dunn
- Succeeded by: Clare Boothe Luce

31st United States Ambassador to Argentina
- In office March 13, 1951 – March 12, 1952
- President: Harry S. Truman
- Preceded by: Stanton Griffis
- Succeeded by: Albert F. Nufer

Personal details
- Born: May 11, 1894 Yonkers, New York, U.S.
- Died: September 27, 1984 (aged 90) Brattleboro, Vermont, U.S.
- Spouses: Harriet Allen Butler (m. 1920; died 1964) Carol Laise (m. 1967)
- Education: Yale University
- Profession: Businessman and diplomat
- Awards: Presidential Medal of Freedom with Distinction (1963, 1967); President's Award for Distinguished Federal Civilian Service (1979)

Ellsworth F. Bunker (May 11, 1894 – September 27, 1984) was an American businessman and diplomat who served as ambassador to Argentina, Italy, India, Nepal and South Vietnam. He is perhaps best known for being a hawk on the war in Vietnam and Southeast Asia during the 1960s and 1970s. As of February 2024, Bunker is one of only three people to have been awarded the Presidential Medal of Freedom twice, and the only person to receive both awards With Distinction.

== Early life and education ==
Ellsworth Bunker was born on May 11, 1894, in Yonkers, New York. He was the eldest of three children of George Raymond Bunker and Jeanie Polhemus (née Cobb), whose family descended from prominent early Dutch settlers including the Evertson family (of the Great Nine Partners) and the Schuyler family. His great-grandmother Eliza Brodhead Polhemus née Heyer was a niece of Stephen Whitney, reputedly the wealthiest American of his time after John Jacob Astor, while her first cousin Charles Suydam was the brother-in-law of Astor's grandson William Backhouse Astor Jr. and his wife Caroline Schermerhorn Astor.

Bunker's father was one of the founders and chairman of the board of National Sugar Refining Company. His younger brother, Arthur Hugh Bunker (July 29, 1895 – May 19, 1964), was also a noted businessman, chairman of the executive committee of the War Production Board (1941–1945) during World War II, and president and then board chairman of American Metal Climax (AMAX). He was married to actress and writer Isabel Leighton. His first cousin Dorothy Penrose Cobb was married to historian Frederick Lewis Allen.

Ellsworth Bunker was enrolled at Yale University in 1912 and graduated in 1916 with a major in economics and a minor in history.

== Career ==
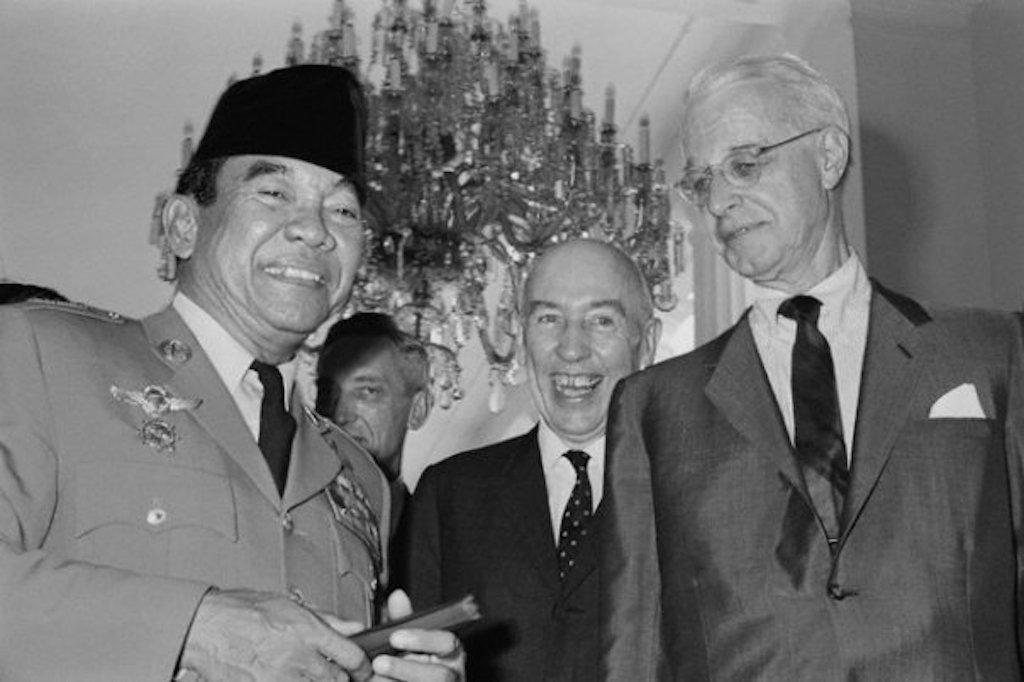
Ellsworth Bunker with Indonesian President Sukarno at Merdeka Palace during a visit to Jakarta, Indonesia March 1965.

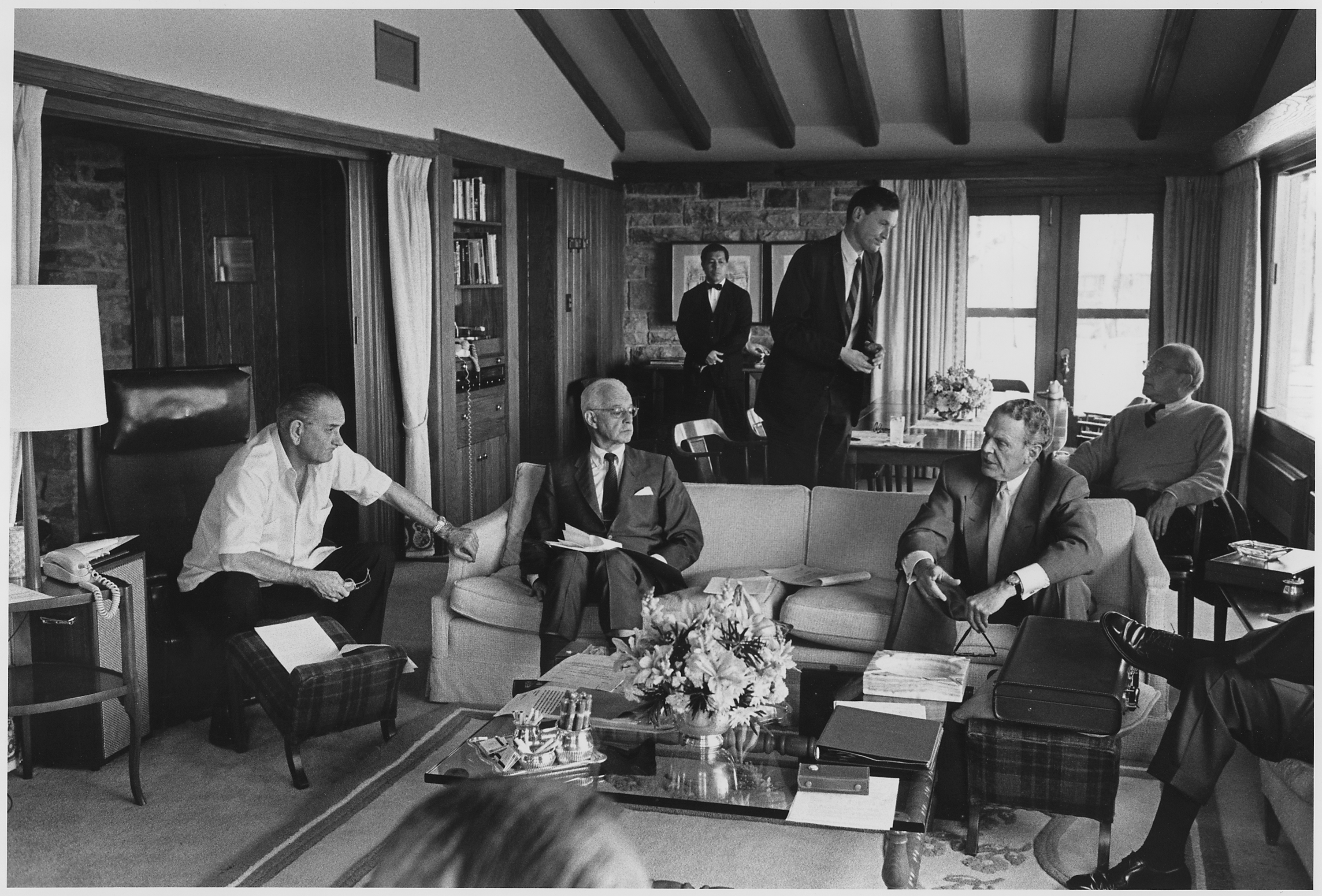
Ellsworth Bunker with President Lyndon B. Johnson and Secretary of Defense Clark Clifford at Camp David, Maryland April 1968.

Bunker first worked in his father's company, National Sugar Refining Company, eventually becoming the company's president, succeeding Horace Havemeyer Sr., in 1942. During World War II he served as chairman of the War Production Board's cane sugar advisory committee. He retired as an active executive in 1951 and purchased a 600-acre dairy farm in Putney, Vermont. He remained a member of the board of National Sugar until 1966.

He then moved to government during the Harry S. Truman administration, when Truman appointed him ambassador to Argentina in April 1951. Next he was ambassador to Italy in February 1952. From November 1953 until November 1956 he was president of the American Red Cross. In November 1956 he was appointed ambassador to India and Nepal by Dwight D. Eisenhower, and sworn in December 1956, where he played a crucial role in the covert alliance between the two powers against China. He was replaced by John Kenneth Galbraith in 1961. During 1962 he acted as U.S. mediator in the New York Agreement over Western New Guinea.

After a period back in Washington, D.C., he was made U.S. ambassador to the Organization of American States, 1964–1966. President Lyndon B. Johnson appointed him U.S. ambassador to South Vietnam, 1967–1973. Once in Saigon, he strongly supported the war efforts of Presidents Johnson and Richard Nixon, and applauded US incursions into Laos and Cambodia. Following the conclusion of the Vietnam War, Bunker headed the US team involved in the drawing up of the 1977 Torrijos-Carter Treaties.

He was awarded the Presidential Medal of Freedom with Distinction twice—the first time by John F. Kennedy in 1963 (though the ceremony took place during Lyndon B Johnson's term) and the second time by Lyndon B. Johnson in 1967. He is one of only two persons (the other being Colin Powell) who received the award twice, and the only person to receive it both times with distinction.

== Personal life ==
Bunker married a neighbor, Harriet Allen Butler, daughter of Ellen Mudge and George Prentiss Butler, in Yonkers, New York on April 24, 1920. Harriet had made friends with Bunkers' sister Katherine when the two girls attended Miss Porter's School in Farmington, Connecticut. They had three children, John Birkbeck, Samuel Emmet, and Ellen Mudge. Butler died in 1964.

On January 3, 1967 he married fellow ambassador Caroline Clendening "Carol" Laise in Katmandu, Nepal. Their marriage was the first between two American Ambassadors on active duty. Later that year, Bunker was named ambassador to South Vietnam and for nearly the first six years of their marriage they only saw each other monthly, via a special government flight offered by President Johnson as enticement for Bunker to accept the post. Laise died in 1991. Ambassador Laise was a friend of the first Mrs. Bunker.

Bunker died on September 27, 1984, at his dairy farm in Putney, Vermont. The funeral was attended by his good friend and neighbor former senator George Aiken and former president Richard M. Nixon. Aiken died two months later.

His middle child, John Birkbeck Bunker (March 8, 1926 – May 26, 2005), a first lieutenant in World War II, died of cancer at his home in Wheatland, Wyoming at age 79.

== In popular culture ==
- In a 1977 Doonesbury cartoon, one of the supposed terms of the Torrijos–Carter Treaties was that "We get to keep Ellsworth Bunker."
- In a 1978 Doonesbury cartoon, a New York tailor fitting Phred with a very old-fashioned suit says "Ellsworth Bunker used to get everything from me".
- Bunker is mentioned in Allen Ginsberg's poem "September on Jessore Road", which includes the line "Where is Ambassador Bunker today? Are his Helios machine gunning children at play?"
- In chapter 7 of John Irving's 1989 novel A Prayer for Owen Meany: "And whom did Ellsworth Bunker replace? Remember that? Of course you don't!"

Diplomatic posts
| Preceded by Stanton Griffis | United States Ambassador to Argentina; 1951 – 1952 | Succeeded by Albert F. Nufer |
| Preceded by James Clement Dunn | U. S. Ambassador to Italy; 1952–1953 | Succeeded by Clare Boothe Luce |
| Preceded by John Sherman Cooper | U.S. Ambassador to India; 1956–1961 | Succeeded by John Kenneth Galbraith |
| Preceded by Henry Cabot Lodge Jr. | U.S. Ambassador to South Vietnam; 1967–1973 | Succeeded by Graham Martin |
Awards and achievements
| Preceded by Dean Rusk | Sylvanus Thayer Award recipient 1970 | Succeeded by Neil Armstrong |
