= Raymond A. Hare =

American diplomat

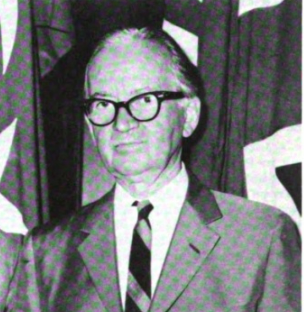

United States Ambassador to Egypt
- In office August 14, 1956 – December 18, 1959
- President: Dwight D. Eisenhower
- Preceded by: Henry A. Byroade
- Succeeded by: G. Frederick Reinhardt

7th Assistant Secretary of State for Near Eastern and South Asian Affairs
- In office September 22, 1965 – November 30, 1966
- Preceded by: Phillips Talbot
- Succeeded by: Lucius D. Battle

5th Director General of the Foreign Service
- In office October 19, 1954 – August 29, 1956
- Preceded by: Gerald Augustin Drew
- Succeeded by: Joseph Charles Satterthwaite

Personal details
- Born: April 3, 1901 Martinsburg, West Virginia, U.S.
- Died: February 9, 1994 (aged 92) Washington, D.C., U.S.
- Education: Grinnell College (BA)

Raymond Arthur Hare (April 3, 1901 – February 9, 1994) was a United States diplomat who was Director General of the United States Foreign Service from 1954 to 1956 and Assistant Secretary of State for Near Eastern and South Asian Affairs from 1965 to 1966.

== Biography ==
=== Early years, 1901–1939 ===
Raymond A. Hare was born in Martinsburg, West Virginia on April 3, 1901 and raised in Boothbay Harbor, Maine. He was educated at Grinnell College, receiving a B.A. in 1924. After college, the president of Grinnell offered Hare a position at Robert College in Istanbul and Hare worked as an instructor at Robert College from 1924 to 1926. During his time in Istanbul, he developed a lifelong fascination with Islamic architecture and began a collection of notes and photographs that he later donated to the Arthur M. Sackler Gallery at the end of his career. He spent 1926-27 working at the American Chamber of Commerce for the Levant and liaising with the U.S. Consulate in Istanbul.

Impressed with Hare, the consulate offered him a position in their commercial section, so in 1927, Hare traveled to Washington, D.C. to sit for the United States Foreign Service exam, and after passing, returned to work in the consulate in Istanbul. In 1931, he became one of a select group of Foreign Service Officers sent to study at the École nationale des langues orientales vivantes in Paris to study the Arabic language. Hare later became one of the few American diplomats of his era with a working knowledge of Arabic. After completing his Arabic studies, he was posted in Beirut 1932-33 and in Tehran 1933-39.

=== During World War II, 1939–1945 ===
With the outbreak of World War II, in 1939, he became Second Secretary in at the U.S. embassy in Cairo. Given the strategic importance of Egypt during World War II, Hare played a critical role in moving American materiel to British forces in Egypt under the Lend-Lease program. He later worked with the Persian Gulf Command in moving materiel to the Soviet Union by shipping it by rail through Iran following the Anglo-Soviet invasion of Iran. During World War II, Hare became convinced of the strategic importance of the Middle East in the postwar period.

In 1944, Hare was assigned to the U.S. Embassy, London, where he was responsible for coordinating British and American policy towards the Middle East. He later returned to Washington, D.C., serving as an advisor at the Dumbarton Oaks Conference.

=== Postwar years at the State Department, 1945–50 ===
Hare was sent to the National War College in 1946 as part of a program designed to foster cooperation between members of the United States Department of State and the United States armed forces. Before completing his year there, he was abruptly reassigned to Nepal to serve as deputy chief of mission. Over the next several years, he traveled in the region, including in India and Pakistan, and concluded the hasty withdrawal of Mountbatten would likely create great problems in the region. The extensive field notes he kept, including interviews with regional political and regional leaders, were later donated to Columbia University.

Hare became Chief of the Division of South Asian Affairs at the State Department in 1947; Deputy Director of the Office of Near Eastern and African Affairs in 1948; and Deputy Assistant Secretary of State for Near Eastern, South Asian, and African Affairs in 1949. In the latter capacity, Hare drafted and negotiated the Tripartite Declaration of 1950, by which the British, the French, and the U.S. agreed to limit arms sales to the Middle East in the wake of the 1948 Arab–Israeli War.

=== Ambassador, 1950–1954 ===
In 1950, President of the United States Harry S. Truman nominated Hare as United States Ambassador to Saudi Arabia and, after Senate Confirmation, he was appointed on September 20, 1950. Ambassador Hare presented his credentials to the Saudi government on October 24, 1950. Hare was ambassador just as oil started to flow in Saudi Arabia. At Jeddah, he established a relationship with Ibn Saud of Saudi Arabia, though he did not deal directly with oil issues as Aramco handled its own relations with the Saudi royal family. However, Hare was tasked with convincing the Saudis to allow the U.S. access to military facilities at Dhahran. He was successful at negotiating an extended-stay agreement in 1952; as part of the deal to allow U.S. troops to remain in Dhahran, the U.S. provided Saudi Arabia with a number of planes that formed the foundation of what would become the Royal Saudi Air Force. During the 1953 dispute over ownership of the Buraimi Oasis, Hare convinced the British and Saudis to agree to a standstill agreement, though he was ultimately unable to defuse the situation.

Hare's posting in Saudi Arabia was terminated on July 3, 1953 when President Dwight D. Eisenhower nominated Hare as United States Ambassador to Lebanon. Less than a year later, he was recalled to Washington, D.C. to become Director General of the United States Foreign Service.

=== Director General of the United States Foreign Service, 1954–1956 ===
During the McCarthy era, the United States Department of State had been heavily criticized. President Eisenhower appointed the Wriston Committee to recommend changes to the way in which State Department personnel were hired, organized, and promoted. The Wriston Committee recommended drastic changes to the United States Foreign Service. Up to that point, the Foreign Service had offered two distinct career paths to State Department officials: as field officers abroad, or as desk staff in Washington. The Wriston Committee recommended a new system that would see diplomats alternate between foreign postings and postings in Washington. As Director General of the Foreign Service, Hare was tasked with the "Wristonization" of the Foreign Service.

=== Ambassador, 1956–1965 ===
In July 1956, United States Secretary of State John Foster Dulles announced that the U.S. was canceling funding for the Aswan Dam, thus triggering the Suez Crisis. In the midst of this crisis, Dulles lost faith in United States Ambassador to Egypt Henry A. Byroade and, as part of a wider shakeup of U.S. State Department officials in the Near East, Hare was appointed Ambassador to Egypt to replace Byroade. Ambassador Hare arrived in Cairo shortly before the breakout of the Suez War, presenting his credentials to the Egyptian government on September 25, 1956. During his initial days in Egypt, Hare oversaw the evacuation of U.S. citizens from Egypt. He also established a relationship with Gamal Abdel Nasser, and met often and at great length with Nasser during the war. He informed Nasser that the U.S. would not offer Egypt military aid, but promised to work through the United Nations to secure peace. Hare kept extensive notes of his meetings with Nasser during the war. Hare was present in Egypt to see the creation of the United Arab Republic in 1958.

With the overthrow of the Kingdom of Iraq in July 1958 (the 14 July Revolution), American policy was to shore up the governments of Jordan and Lebanon. Hare opposed the U.S. military intervention in the 1958 Lebanon crisis, arguing that it caused irreparable damage to U.S. reputation in the region (the U.S. had previously had a good reputation). Hare became a strong advocate of Public Law 480, a program designed to provide food aide to Egypt in an effort to build goodwill and forestall Soviet influence in Egypt.

Hare was United States Ambassador to North Yemen in 1959, and then returned to the State Department in Washington in 1960. Later in 1960, Turkey threatened to invade Cyprus, and in the midst of the crisis, Hare was named United States Ambassador to Turkey. He played a critical role in convincing the Turkish government not to invade Cyprus, though his efforts were later nearly undone by a strongly worded letter from President Lyndon B. Johnson. Hare was Ambassador to Turkey until 1965.

=== Assistant Secretary of State for Near Eastern Affairs, 1965–1966 ===
President Johnson nominated Hare as Assistant Secretary of State for Near Eastern and South Asian Affairs in 1965. Hare held this office from September 22, 1965 until his retirement from government service on November 30, 1966. During this time, he was unable to prevent the gutting of the Public Law 480 program he had so ardently supported.

=== Retirement, 1966–1994 ===
Hare was president of the Middle East Institute from 1966 to 1969. In retirement, he saw his son, Paul Julian Hare (b. 1937), also achieve success as a diplomat, serving as United States Ambassador to Zambia from 1985 to 1988.

He lived in Washington, D.C. until his death of pneumonia on February 9, 1994.

Diplomatic posts
Preceded by J. Rives Childs	United States Ambassador to Saudi Arabia; October 24, 1950 – July 8, 1953	Succeeded by George Wadsworth
Preceded by Harold B. Minor	United States Ambassador to Lebanon; 1953 – 1954	Succeeded by Donald R. Heath
Preceded by Gerald A. Drew	Director General of the United States Foreign Service; October 19, 1954 – August 29, 1956	Succeeded by Joseph C. Satterthwaite
Preceded by Henry A. Byroade	United States Ambassador to Egypt; September 25, 1956 – September 18, 1959	Succeeded by G. Frederick Reinhardt
Preceded by Fletcher Warren	United States Ambassador to Turkey; 1960 – 1965	Succeeded by Parker T. Hart
Government offices
Preceded by Phillips Talbot	Assistant Secretary of State for Near Eastern and South Asian Affairs; September 22, 1965 – November 30, 1966	Succeeded by Lucius D. Battle
