= George Wadsworth II =

American diplomat (1893–1958)

George Wadsworth
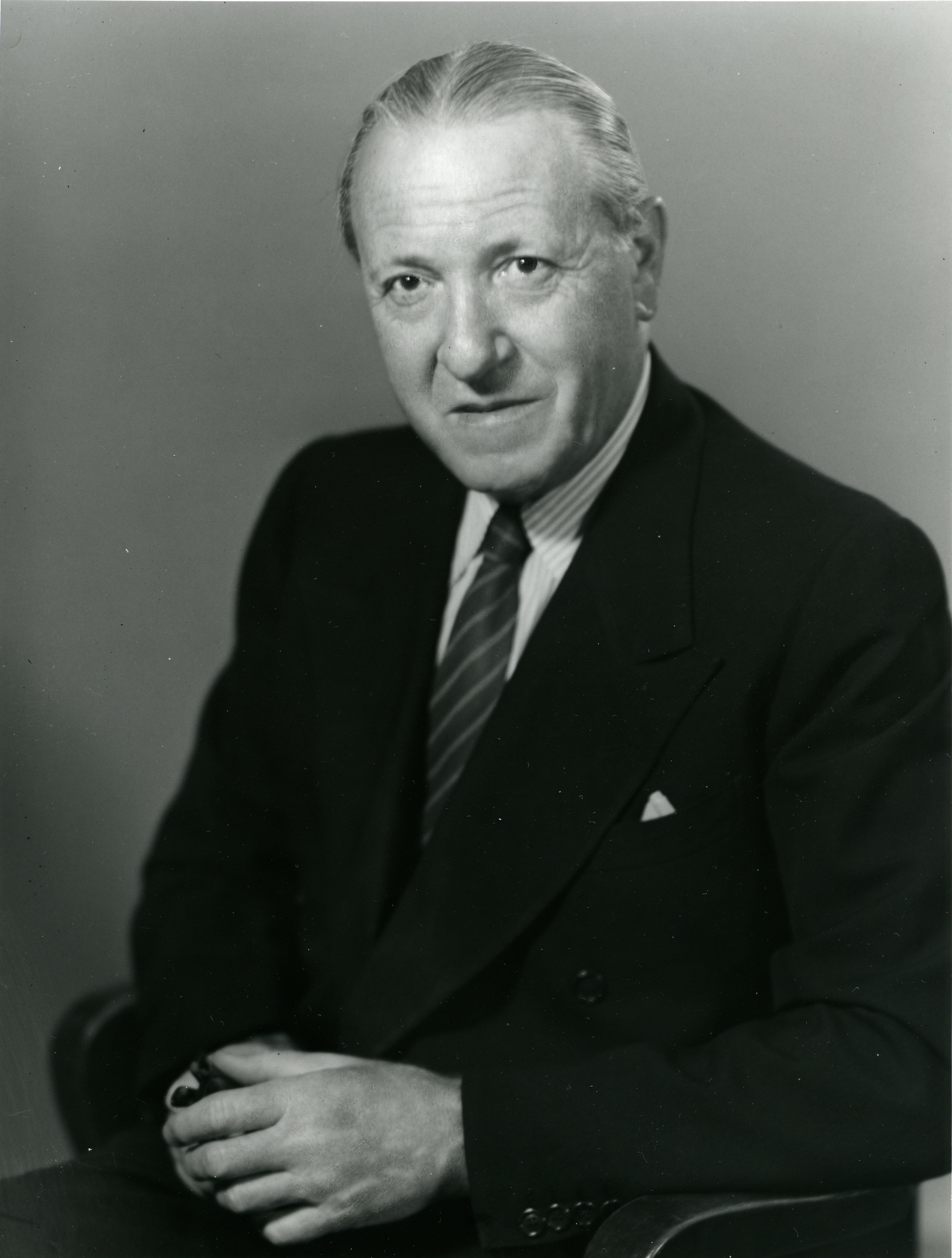

3rd United States Minister to North Yemen
- In office January 9, 1954 – January 1, 1958
- President: Dwight D. Eisenhower
- Preceded by: Raymond A. Hare
- Succeeded by: Donald R. Heath

3rd United States Ambassador to Saudi Arabia
- In office January 9, 1954 – January 1, 1958
- President: Dwight D. Eisenhower
- Preceded by: Raymond A. Hare
- Succeeded by: Donald R. Heath

5th United States Ambassador to Czechoslovakia
- In office October 1, 1948 – January 2, 1952
- President: Harry S. Truman
- Preceded by: Ellis O. Briggs
- Succeeded by: U. Alexis Johnson

12th United States Ambassador to Turkey
- In office October 1, 1948 – January 2, 1952
- President: Harry S. Truman
- Preceded by: Edwin C. Wilson
- Succeeded by: George C. McGhee

1st United States Ambassador to Iraq
- In office February 15, 1947 – September 26, 1948
- President: Harry S. Truman
- Preceded by: Loy W. Henderson
- Succeeded by: Edward Savage Crocker II

1st United States Minister to Syria
- In office November 17, 1944 – February 8, 1947
- President: Franklin D. Roosevelt
- Preceded by: Diplomatic relations established
- Succeeded by: Paul H. Alling

1st United States Minister to Lebanon
- In office November 16, 1944 – February 1, 1947
- President: Franklin D. Roosevelt
- Preceded by: Diplomatic relations established
- Succeeded by: Lowell C. Pinkerton

United States Ambassador to Italy
- Acting, as chargé d'affaires
- In office October 6, 1941 – December 11, 1941
- President: Franklin D. Roosevelt
- Preceded by: William Phillips
- Succeeded by: Alexander Comstock Kirk (1945)

Personal details
- Born: April 3, 1893 Beverly, Massachusetts, U.S.
- Died: March 5, 1958 (aged 64)
- Spouse: Dorothy Marnard Lasell
- Education: Union College
- Occupation: Career FSO

George Wadsworth II (April 3, 1893 – March 5, 1958) was a United States diplomat, specializing in the Middle East.

== Life ==
Wadsworth was born in Buffalo, New York and received a degree in chemical engineering from Union College in Schenectady, New York. He became interested in teaching abroad and moved to Beirut, Lebanon and joined the staff of the American University of Beirut as a professor (he served there from 1914 to 1917). To supplement his income, he took a part-time job working as a clerk in the United States consulate in Beirut.

In May 1921, he married Dorothy Marnard Lasell. She died on November 20, 1928.; married, May 1, 1936, to Norma Mack, daughter of Norman E. Mack and Harriet Taggart Mack.

He had two children with his first wife: George Wadsworth Lasell and Caroline Harris (née Wadsworth).

== Foreign Service career ==
In 1917, he entered the Foreign Service full-time and served in positions at embassies in the Middle East and Eastern Europe.

From 1936 to 1940, Wadsworth served as Consul General in Jerusalem. In 1941, Wadsworth was serving in the United States embassy in Rome, Italy under Ambassador William Phillips who had been tasked with persuading Benito Mussolini to not enter World War II on the side of the Axis powers. Unfortunately, his efforts failed and he fled Italy five days before the declaration of war. During those five days, Wadsworth served as Chargé d'affaires ad interim there. On December 9, 1941, Wadsworth informed the U.S. Secretary of State at the time that Italy would declare war against the United States if Germany did so. When war was declared by Italy on December 11, 1941, Wadsworth was informed personally by Italian Foreign Minister Galeazzo Ciano. He then worked with Italian authorities to secure the safe passage of the embassy staff home, and was one of the three final staff members to leave in May 1942. He arrived back in New York by ocean liner in June. This was Wadsworth's first duty as Chief of Mission.

On returning to the US, Wadsworth was nearly immediately assigned to be Consul General, and then the first Ambassador to Syria and Lebanon, a political move that strengthened those countries against claims by Vichy France. After the war, he was made the first Ambassador to Iraq, previously served only by a lower-ranking Minister Plenipotentiary. He was subsequently in his career made ambassador to Turkey, Czechoslovakia, and then Saudi Arabia, and Yemen.

Starting during his time in Turkey, Wadsworth began a practice that would be one of the hallmarks of his diplomatic career. He raised money to establish a golf course in Ankara, which became a "social center" for diplomatic circles. Throughout the remainder of his career, he raised funds to set up nine other golf courses in the Middle East, with one newspaper describing him as the "Johnny Appleseed of golf courses, sowing fairways in the most impossible places."

He died of cancer in 1958, aged 64, less than a month before he was scheduled to retire on his 65th birthday.

== Sources ==
- Bertram D. Hulen (Dec 12, 1941). "Hull Very Frigid to Visiting Envoys". The New York Times. p. 3.
- "Gets Diplomatic Post". The New York Times. Oct 3, 1942. p. 6.
- "Obituaries". Chicago Daily Tribune. Mar 7, 1958. p. A11A.

Diplomatic posts
Preceded by William Phillips	United States ambassador to Italy; 1941; Chargé d'affaires ad interim	Succeeded by Alexander C. Kirk; After World War II
Preceded by None	United States ambassador to Syria; 1942 – 1947; Consul General, promoted to Envoy Extraordinary and Minister Plenipotentiary	Succeeded by James Hugh Keeley Jr.
Preceded by None	United States ambassador to Lebanon; 1942 – 1947; First Ambassador	Succeeded by Lowell C. Pinkerton
Preceded by James S. Moose Jr. Chargé d'affaires ad interim	United States ambassador to Iraq; 1947 – 1948; First Ambassador	Succeeded by Edward S. Crocker
Preceded by Edwin C. Wilson	United States Ambassador to Turkey; 1948 – 1952	Succeeded by George C. McGhee
Preceded by Ellis O. Briggs	United States Ambassador to Czechoslovakia; 1952 – 1953	Succeeded by U. Alexis Johnson
Preceded by Raymond A. Hare	United States ambassador to Saudi Arabia; 1954 – 1958	Succeeded by Donald R. Heath
Preceded by Raymond A. Hare	United States ambassador to Yemen; 1954 – 1958	Succeeded by Donald R. Heath
