= List of ambassadors of the United States to South Vietnam =

Ambassador of the United States to South Vietnam
- Seal of the United States Department of State
- Incumbent; None
- Nominator: The president of the United States
- Inaugural holder: Donald R. Heath as Envoy Extraordinary and Minister Plenipotentiary
- Formation: June 29, 1950
- Final holder: Graham A. Martin
- Abolished: April 29, 1975

In 1950, the United States recognized the State of Vietnam, led by Bảo Đại, established diplomatic relations, and sent its first ambassador to Saigon. The country later became officially known as the Republic of Vietnam following the rise of President Ngô Đình Diệm in 1955. The US was opposed to the communist government of the North, led by Chairman Hồ Chí Minh, and did not recognize the northern regime.

At the end of the Vietnam War, the US Embassy in Saigon was shuttered and all embassy personnel evacuated on April 29, 1975, just prior to the capture of Saigon by North Vietnamese and Viet Cong forces. Since the normalization of United States–Vietnam relations in 1995, the US Consulate General in Ho Chi Minh City stands adjacent to the site of the former embassy which was demolished in 1998. The US Ambassador to Vietnam is now seated in the US Embassy in Hanoi, the former capital city of North Vietnam and the current capital of the unified Socialist Republic of Vietnam.

== Ambassadors ==
| Portrait | Name | Type | Title | Appointed | Presented credentials | Terminated mission |
|---|---|---|---|---|---|---|
| | Donald R. Heath | Career FSO | EE/MP | June 29, 1950 | October 22, 1950 | June 25, 1952 |
| | Donald R. Heath | Career FSO | AE/P | June 25, 1952 | July 11, 1952 | November 14, 1954 |
| | G. Frederick Reinhardt | Career FSO | AE/P | April 20, 1955 | May 28, 1955 | February 10, 1957 |
| | Elbridge Durbrow | Career FSO | AE/P | March 14, 1957 | April 16, 1957 | May 3, 1961 |
| | Frederick E. Nolting Jr. | Career FSO | AE/P | March 15, 1961 | May 10, 1961 | August 15, 1963 |
| | Henry Cabot Lodge Jr. | Political appointee | AE/P | August 1, 1963 | August 26, 1963 | June 28, 1964 |
| | Maxwell D. Taylor | Political appointee | AE/P | July 1, 1964 | July 14, 1964 | July 30, 1965 |
| | Henry Cabot Lodge Jr. | Political appointee | AE/P | July 31, 1965 | August 25, 1965 | April 25, 1967 |
| | Ellsworth F. Bunker | Political appointee | AE/P | April 5, 1967 | April 28, 1967 | May 11, 1973 |
| | Graham A. Martin | Career FSO | AE/P | June 21, 1973 | July 20, 1973 | April 29, 1975 |

=== Deputy ambassadors ===
| Portrait | Name | Start date | End date |
|---|---|---|---|
| | U. Alexis Johnson | June 1964 | September 1965 |
| | William J. Porter | September 1965 | May 1967 |
| | Eugene M. Locke | May 1967 | January 1968 |
| | Samuel D. Berger | March 1968 | March 1972 |
| | Charles S. Whitehouse | March 1972 | August 1973 |

== Sources ==
- US Department of State: Chiefs of Mission for South Vietnam
