= Graham Martin =

American diplomat (1912–1990)

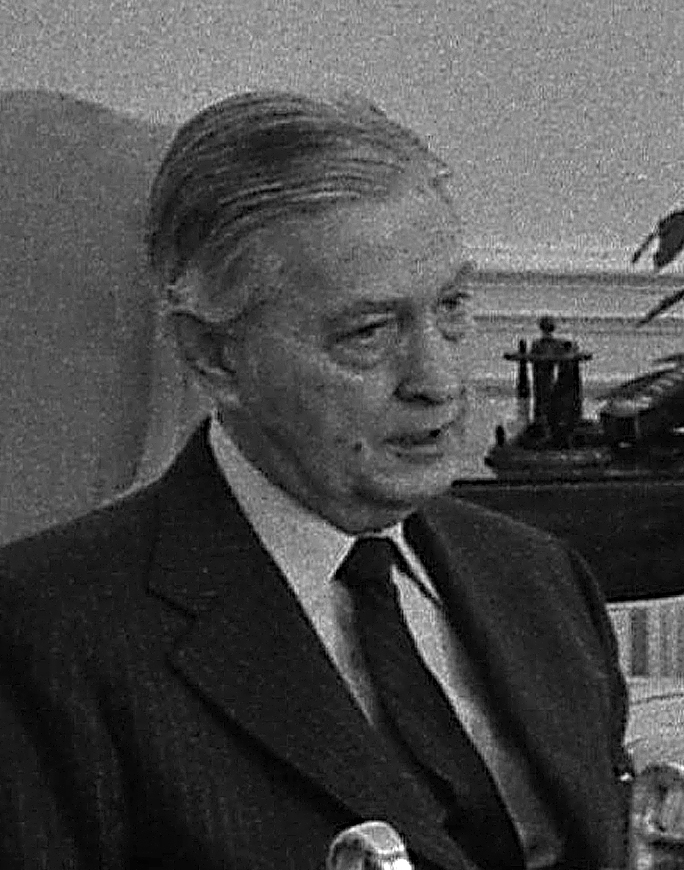
- Martin in 1975

United States Ambassador to South Vietnam
- In office June 21, 1973 – April 30, 1975
- President: Richard Nixon; Gerald Ford
- Preceded by: Ellsworth Bunker
- Succeeded by: Post dissolved

United States Ambassador to Italy
- In office October 30, 1969 – February 10, 1973
- President: Richard Nixon
- Preceded by: Gardner Ackley
- Succeeded by: John A. Volpe

United States Ambassador to Thailand
- In office September 10, 1963 – September 9, 1967
- President: John F. Kennedy; Lyndon B. Johnson
- Preceded by: Kenneth Todd Young
- Succeeded by: Leonard S. Unger

United States Ambassador to the United Nations and other International Organizations in Geneva
- In office September 18, 1960 – April 15, 1962
- President: Dwight D. Eisenhower; John F. Kennedy
- Preceded by: Henry Serrano Villard
- Succeeded by: Roger Tubby

Personal details
- Born: Graham Anderson Martin; September 22, 1912 Mars Hill, North Carolina, U.S.
- Died: March 13, 1990 (aged 77) Winston-Salem, North Carolina, U.S.
- Resting place: Arlington National Cemetery
- Spouse: Dorothy Martin (nee Wallace)
- Children: Janet Martin Tantemsapya, Nancy Lane, Michael Martin
- Education: Wake Forest College
- Committees: National Recovery Administration
- Awards: Distinguished Honor Award

Military service
- Allegiance: United States
- Branch/service: United States Army Air Forces
- Years of service: 1930s-1946
- Unit: Military Intelligence Corps (United States Army)
- Battles/wars: World War II

Graham Anderson Martin (September 22, 1912 – March 13, 1990) was an American diplomat. He was the ambassador to Thailand and as U.S. representative to SEATO from 1963 to 1967, ambassador to Italy from 1969 to 1973 and the last United States Ambassador to South Vietnam from 1973 until his evacuation during the Fall of Saigon in 1975.

== Early life ==
Martin was born and raised in the small town of Mars Hill, North Carolina, in the state's western mountains. His father was an ordained Baptist minister. He graduated from Wake Forest College in 1932. Like almost all whites from the South at the time, Martin was a Democrat in his politics. However, unlike many other Southern whites who represented the conservative wing of the Democratic Party, Martin was an avid supporter of the New Deal, which he saw as a way to improve North Carolina, which was a very backward and underdeveloped state at the time. Under the administration of Franklin Roosevelt, Martin became a protégé of W. Averell Harriman, who became his patron, which greatly aided his career. Martin began his career in the National Recovery Administration, a New Deal agency created to counter the effects of the Great Depression. During World War II, he was a U.S. Army Intelligence Officer, and he was aboard USS Missouri for the Japanese surrender in 1945.

== Career ==
Martin first worked in the diplomatic field at the U.S. embassy in Paris, France, from 1947 to 1955. The American journalist Stanley Karnow described Martin as a "fierce anti-Communist liberal" whose main duties in Paris were to counter the influence of the French Communist Party on French life. His abilities as an administrative counselor and deputy Chief of Mission gained him attention from the State Department, which rapidly advanced his career. President Eisenhower appointed Martin as the Representative of the United States to the European Office of the United Nations in Geneva, and he served in that office from 1960 to 1962.

=== Ambassador to Thailand ===
Martin was appointed on 10 September 1963 and left this post on 9 September 1967.

While serving as ambassador to Thailand, Martin came to the attention of Richard Nixon, during a banquet for King Bhumibol Adulyadej at the Embassy in Bangkok. Nixon was in Thailand acting as a corporate attorney, accompanying Vice President Hubert Humphrey. When the King toasted President Lyndon Johnson, Humphrey tried to return the toast with a toast to the King. Martin interceded and gave the toast himself, explaining later to both Humphrey and Nixon that as the Ambassador, he was the President's personal representative. He finished his explanation by saying "If you become President yourself someday, Mr. Vice President, you can be sure that I will guard your interests as closely as I did President Johnson's tonight".

During Ambassador Martin's tenure in Thailand, he forged close bonds with the local government and the Thai Royal family. Johnson and Secretary of Defense McNamara heeded the Joint Chiefs' request to escalate bombing runs over North Vietnam; and to provide close air support cover for covert missions in the highlands of South Vietnam; the secret war in Laos; and Cambodian excursions. The U.S. military needed more air bases for staging, and to launch B-52 bomber missions. Using his personal relations with Thai royals and government leaders, Martin convinced Thailand to allow more U.S. troops and materiel to be stationed at bases on Thai soil. Martin advised that if Thai commanders were "in charge", these would remain "Thai bases"...and avoid embarrassment or public support for the escalating U.S. war. The U.S. military expanded existing bases and build new ones; including Udorn Royal Thai Air Force Base; and the U-Tapao Royal Thai Navy Airfield in October 1965. From 1966 to 1975, U-Tapao became the most important strategic air base for U.S. bombing and cover missions of the war.

=== Ambassador to Italy ===
Martin was appointed on 30 October 1969 and left this post on 10 February 1973.

During his time as ambassador Martin was instrumental in channelling funds to various entities believed to be sympathetic to American foreign policy goals, including organisations and individuals with dubious anti-democratic and neo-fascist connotations. In 1972, he gave over $800,000 to General Vito Miceli, Italy's army intelligence chief, with the approval of the director of the National Security Council, Henry Kissinger, despite objections from the CIA Rome station chief about Miceli's ability to spend the money properly and his association with a prominent neo-fascist journalist (believed to be Pino Rauti, the founder of Ordine Nuovo). Philip Willan, in his book Puppetmasters: The Political Use of Terrorism in Italy (1991), explains that Martin – described by the Pike Committee in 1976 as a "man of unusual force" – managed to seize control of this money through willpower alone, citing an argument that he had about the funds with the Rome station chief as evidence of his uncompromising nature:

Chief of station expressed the view that ambassador [deleted] should first clarify this point in personal exchange with CIA... He [ambassador] thereupon accused chief of station of dragging his feet in contacting [foreign intelligence officer, presumably Miceli] and said if this continued beyond today he would "Instruct Marine guards not to let you in this building and put you on the airplane." Chief of station said he thought this a bit extreme and expressed view that ambassador [deleted] could hardly object to what appeared legitimate Headquarters decision. He [ambassador] did object and with vigour.

Miceli, who was arrested on charges of subversive conspiracy in 1974, subsequently became a far-right member of the Italian parliament. It is unknown to this day how he spent the money.

=== Ambassador to South Vietnam ===
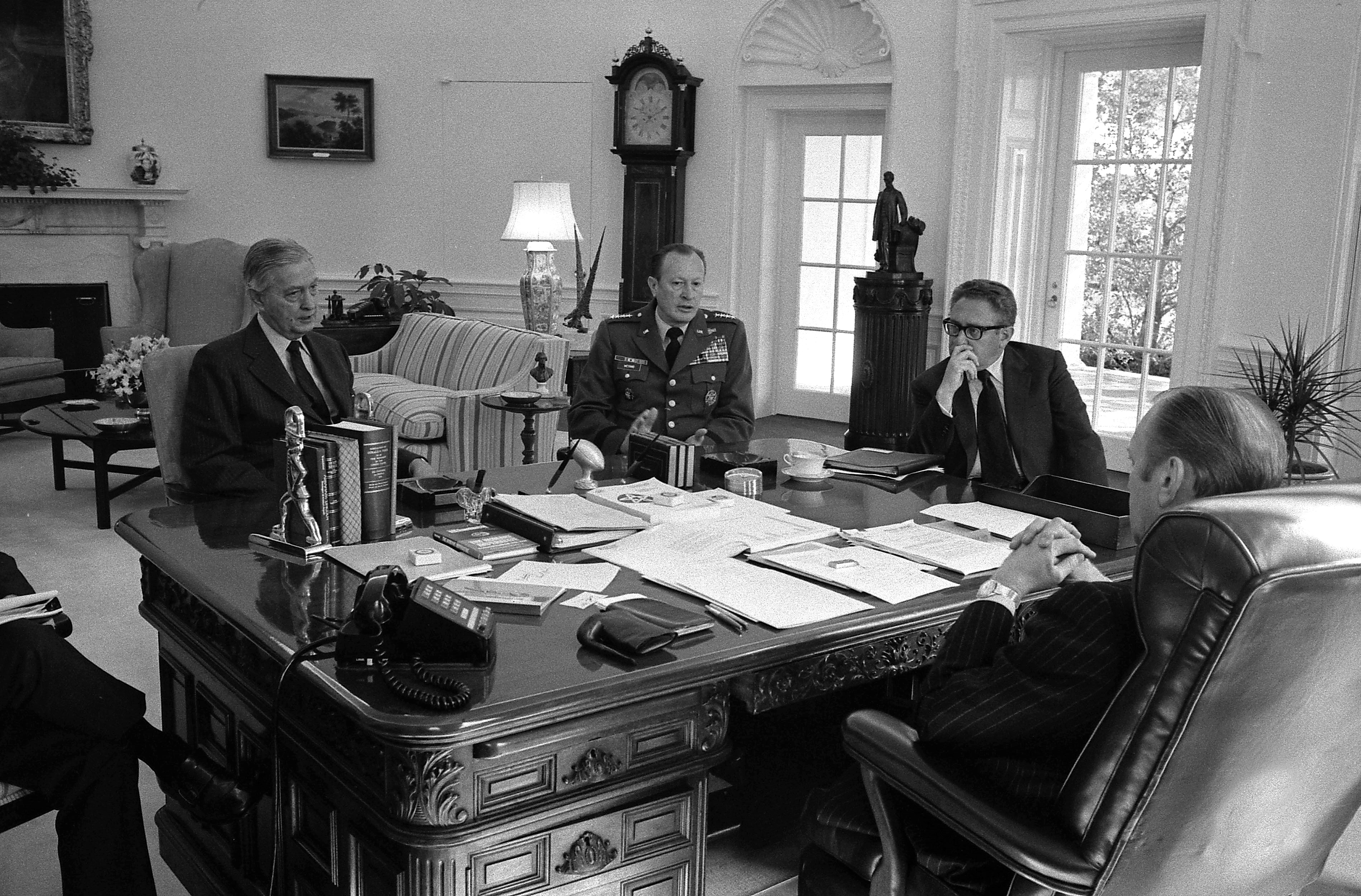
Martin (left) meeting with President Ford, Henry Kissinger and Frederick C. Weyand at the Oval Office in 1975

Martin was appointed as Ambassador to South Vietnam on 21 June 1973. Karnow wrote about Martin that: "anachronistically, he was still inspired by the crusade to save Southeast Asia" from Communism. Martin's nephew had been killed in action in South Vietnam in 1965, and Martin felt a strong sense of responsibility to ensure that his death was not in vain by winning the war. Karnow described the reasons for Martin's appointment as ambassador because he was the ideal "fall guy" should South Vietnam collapse. Martin was one of the few U.S. diplomats who was still committed to winning the Vietnam war, and as a liberal Democrat, any failures in Saigon on his part would not reflect badly on the conservative Republican Nixon administration. Karnow noted that the disdain and contempt he was held in Washington could be seen in the fact that neither Nixon nor his National Security Adviser Henry Kissinger mentioned him even once in their respective memoirs. Though not in his memoirs, Kissinger does give accolades to Martin indirectly while relating the circumstances surrounding the U.S. evacuation from Saigon in his book Ending the Vietnam War.

Martin was a controversial U.S. ambassador to South Vietnam; he was ill-prepared to act as an ambassador in a country fighting for its survival. Martin had been injured in an automobile accident, which limited his ability to travel. During his time in Saigon, he almost never left that city to tour the rest of the country, and as a result his contacts were only with the South Vietnamese elite. Martin spoke no Vietnamese, but he was fluent in French, a language widely spoken by the South Vietnamese elite as Vietnam was a former French colony. Martin's dispatches to Washington tended to reflect his contacts with elite circles in Saigon, and he showed little interest in the masses. In common with many other American diplomats, Martin found President Nguyễn Văn Thiệu to be a "prickly" personality who was too sensitive to any slight, real or imagined. Martin also had an abrasive personality, much given to rudeness and outbursts of rage, and many found him to be unpleasant ambassasdor to deal with. Through Martin had difficult relations with Thiệu, he had an unbounded confidence in his regime, and his dispatches to Washington during almost all of his entire time in Saigon portrayed South Vietnam in a very optimistic light.

The Arab oil shock of October 1973-March 1974 set off a massive bout of inflation that destroyed South Vietnam's economy. In turn, the inflation caused corruption in South Vietnam to reach epic levels as corrupt officials stole more to make up for the inflationary pressure. By the summer of 1974, about 90% of the soldiers of the Army of the Republic of Vietnam (ARVN) were not receiving enough pay to support themselves or their families. Many diplomats at the US Embassy from the summer of 1974 onward reported their concerns that morale in the ARVN had fallen to dangerously low levels. Reflecting his tendency to put the best possible gloss on South Vietnam, Martin in his cables to Washington downplayed these concerns, stating that the ARVN would not collapse. In December 1974, the North Vietnamese People's Army of Vietnam (PAVN) launched an offensive in the Central Highlands of South Vietnam that proved more successful than expected and on 6 January 1975 took the provincial capital of Phước Long. The PAVN commanders reported that many ARVN soldiers simply did not want to fight and surrendered after only token resistance.

On 1 March 1975 the PAVN started the Battle of Ban Me Thuot in the Central Highlands. After the battle ended in a PAVN victory on 11 March 1975, the North Vietnamese decided to launch an offensive to end the war in 1975 instead of 1976 as initially planned. The offensive was named the Ho Chi Minh campaign, a choice of name that reflected the viewpoint it would be a successful operation. By 25 March Huế, the old imperial capital of Vietnam fell to the PAVN. Thiệu was slow to order a withdraw of his divisions and by 30 March when Danang was taken by the PAVN, the ARVN's best divisions were lost. With the road to Saigon wide open, it became imperative for the PAVN to take the capital before the monsoons began in May, leading to a rapid march on Saigon. Once the monsoons began, large scale military operations would be impossible. With the PAVN advancing on Saigon, Martin continued to give optimistic reports about the ability of the ARVN to hold out, and stated that he was against an evacuation. William Colby, the director of the Central Intelligence Agency at a meeting with Kissinger warned that Martin was delusional in his assessment, and advised an evacuation, advice that Kissinger rejected.

During the first four months of 1975, Martin ignored advice to reduce the number of American officials in Saigon down from 6,500 to 1,100 in order to facilitate an evacuation. Believing Saigon would not fall, Martin vetoed plans to move South Vietnamese refugees from Saigon via river freighters down the Saigon River to the port of Vũng Tàu on the South China Sea, where ships would pick them up. Martin advised Kissinger, who was now the Secretary of State, that he was against a mass evacuation from Saigon, which he feared would depress morale in the ARVN. On 3 April 1975, Martin at a meeting with Thiệu admitted that the situation had become grim with the North Vietnamese taking the Central Highlands, but promised him that the United States would send more military aid to help the ARVN hold a line along the Mekong river. In early April 1975, Martin had Alan Carter, the chief of the U.S. information bureau in Saigon, tape a video in which Carter stated that there was no danger of Saigon falling and the United States would stand by the Paris Peace Accords. Martin was sick with pneumonia in April 1975 and his body did not react well with the antibiotics he was taking, he was described as looking "like a walking corpse". By 10 April 1975, the PAVN had reached the town of Xuân Lộc, just 38 miles (61 km) northeast of Saigon.

Martin continued to believe that the ARVN would hold Saigon and the Mekong Delta area after observing ARVN's tenacious 12 days of fighting in the Battle of Xuan Loc under the command of General Le Minh Dao. His delays in initiating an evacuation meant that only a limited number of people could be evacuated in the final airlift. In the NSA history The Secret Sentry, the author says: "In Saigon, Ambassador Graham Martin refused to believe the SIGINT (signals intelligence) reporting that detailed the massive North Vietnamese military buildup taking place all around (Saigon) ... and repeatedly refused to allow NSA's station chief, Tom Glenn, to evacuate his forty-three man staff and their twenty-two dependents from Saigon." Because of Martin's refusal to believe the SIGINT, and his refusal to allow the evacuation of the intelligence staff from the embassy, "The North Vietnamese captured the entire 2,700 man (South Vietnamese SIGINT) organization intact as well as their equipment."

==== Evacuation of Saigon ====
On 20 April 1975, Kissinger instructed Martin to start preparing to pull out all the Americans in South Vietnam while also saying that no South Vietnamese were to be pulled out. Martin, in a telephone call to Kissinger, complained that the "only ass which isn't covered is mine". Kissinger assured him: "When this thing is finally over, I'll be hanging several yards higher than you". On 21 April 1975, Thiệu resigned as president and on 25 April fled to Taiwan as the United States was unwilling to grant him asylum, being replaced as president by General Trần Văn Hương.

The evacuation was chaotic largely because Martin did not order an evacuation to begin until late April 1975. On 29 April 1975, Operation Frequent Wind, the largest helicopter evacuation ever, began as U.S. helicopters flew 8,000 people from Saigon to the fleet offshore in the South China Sea. Martin had waited so long to order an evacuation that it was only possible to leave Saigon via air as the city was surrounded by the advancing PAVN. Martin also refused to classify the Vietnamese common-law wives of Americans and their illegitimate children as refugees under the grounds he disapproved of premarital sex. Martin decreed that only Vietnamese women married to Americans and their legitimate children would be flown out, a ruling that excluded the vast majority of the Vietnamese women in relationships with American men and their children. General Homer D. Smith, the American military attaché, however, was able to relax that order's effect by having an embassy secretary, Eva Kim, type up an unofficial document known as an "affidavit of support" bearing the seal of the embassy together with a blank space for the name of the Vietnamese refugee and another blank space for an American promising to be financially responsible for the said refugee when he or she arrived in the United States that was photocopied thousands of times. Through the "affidavits of support", Smith was able to allow many more Vietnamese to flee South Vietnam than what Martin wanted.

The CIA had provided thousands of laminated name cards for Vietnamese who worked as spies for the CIA that was intended to serve as free passes that would allow them to fly out of Saigon. Because of Martin's opposition to evacuation, the passes were never issued, and instead had to be burned on the embassy's grounds to protect the identities of the CIA's spies. Malcolm Browne, an American journalist in Saigon married to a Vietnamese woman described the evacuation as characterized by "blatant racism" as even those Vietnamese with American passports had their papers carefully scrutinized and were often turned away while any white person was allowed in. Browne complained that the embassy staff were most suspicious of his wife and children despite having valid American passports. Browne was finally forced to have his wife and children fly out in one of the last passenger flights out of Saigon airport to Hong Kong as it proved impossible to leave via the embassy.

Martin ordered the U.S. Marines who served as the embassy's guards to burn the $2 million U.S. dollars in cash that served as the embassy's reserve funds. The Marines took the bags of cash out to the embassy's courtyard, doused them in gasoline and set them afire. Moments later, an aide ran out to shout that Martin had changed his mind and wanted to save the money after all. As the Marines attempted to rescue the burning money, the blades of the helicopters scattered the money, leading to a chaotic scene as the refugees pressing their way into the embassy fought with themselves to grab as many of the charred U.S. dollars as possible. Martin also pressed to have the gold of South Vietnam's Central Bank worth $60 million US moved to New York, but the State Department would not allow the gold to be flown out of Saigon until it was insured. The State Department moved so slowly in insuring the gold that the gold was still at the Central Bank when Saigon fell on 30 April 1975.

Martin's attempt to leave the embassy on 29 April 1975 via his limousine to go to his house set off a near-riot outside the embassy as thousands of people clamored to get inside the embassy when they saw the gates opening. Unable to exit via his car, Martin was forced to walk four blocks down from the embassy to his house where he picked up his wife, Dorothy, together with one suitcase and a model of a Buddhist pagoda. Upon returning to the American embassy, Martin gave the model of the pagoda as a gift to Jean‐Marie Merillon, the French ambassador who was frenetically trying to negotiate a compromise peace. Later that day, Dorothy Martin boarded a helicopter that took her to the American fleet in the South China Sea, leaving behind her personal suitcase so a South Vietnamese woman might be able to squeeze on board with her. Kissinger was highly concerned that Martin would not leave the embassy and stay behind to die fighting for South Vietnam, observing that Martin was deeply committed to saving that state. Later on the same day, Kissinger ordered Martin to blow up the satellite terminal at the embassy in Saigon, saying "I want you heroes home". At 7:53 am on 30 April, the last Marine helicopter flew away from the embassy in Saigon, marking the end of the American presence in Vietnam.

Martin was evacuated by helicopter from the US Embassy on the morning of 30 April 1975 as PAVN forces overran the city. Though he did not know it, the helicopter's crew had orders to arrest him and bring him on board by force if he had refused to go. The helicopter used was a USMC CH-46 Sea Knight call sign Lady Ace 09 of HMM-165, Bureau Number 154803.

== Death ==
Martin died in March 1990 and is buried in Section 3 at Arlington National Cemetery.

== Family ==
While Martin was serving as Ambassador to Thailand, his adopted son, Marine 1stLt Glenn Dill Mann, was killed near Chu Lai, South Vietnam, in November 1965, while attacking enemy positions at Thach Tru with his UH-1 helicopter gunship. 1stLt Mann is buried in Section 3 at Arlington National Cemetery.

== Exhibits ==
The helicopter that evacuated Martin from Saigon, on the same day the Vietnam War ended, is on display at the Flying Leatherneck Aviation Museum in San Diego, California.

== Sources ==
- Encyclopedia of the Vietnam War, ed. Spencer Tucker, s.v. Graham A. Martin.
- Aid, Matthew M. The Secret Sentry, ISBN 978-1-59691-515-2, Bloomsbury Press, 2009; pages 125–7.
- Karnow, Stanley (1983). Vietnam A History. Viking. ISBN 0140265473.
- Langguth, A.J. (2000). Our Vietnam The War 1954-1975. Simon & Schuster. ISBN 0743212312.
- Snepp, Frank. Decent Interval: An Insider's Account of Saigon's Indecent End Told by the CIA's Chief Strategy Analyst in Vietnam, (ISBN 0-7006-1213-0), Simon & Schuster, 1981.

Diplomatic posts
Preceded by Kenneth Todd Young	United States Ambassador to Thailand; 1963–1967	Succeeded by Leonard S. Unger
Preceded by Gardner Ackley	U.S. Ambassador to Italy; 1969–1973	Succeeded by John A. Volpe
Preceded by Ellsworth Bunker	U.S. Ambassador to South Vietnam; 1973–1975	Succeeded by None
