= Dayton S. Mak =

American diplomat

United States Ambassador to Kuwait
- In office 1961–1962
- President: John F. Kennedy
- Preceded by: Position established
- Succeeded by: Parker T. Hart

Personal details
- Born: July 10, 1917 Sioux Falls, South Dakota, U.S.
- Died: March 16, 2018 (aged 100) Washington, D.C., U.S.
- Spouse: Julia Mak
- Children: Holly Mak
- Education: University of Arizona, University of Pennsylvania, Middle East Institute, Naval War College
- Profession: Diplomat
- Awards: Purple Hearts, Bronze Star

Dayton Seymour Mak (July 10, 1917 – March 16, 2018) was an American diplomat who served posts in England, Libya, Lebanon, Kuwait, Saudi Arabia, and Germany. He was the first U.S. Chargé d'Affaires of Kuwait. Mak was also former Director of the Bureau of Intelligence and Research, for Near East South Asia Affairs.

== Biography ==
Mak was born in Sioux Falls, South Dakota on July 10, 1917, but was raised in Iowa. Mak served in the United States Army during World War II between 1941 and 1945. He was awarded two Purple Hearts and one Bronze Star. In 1946, Mak joined the Foreign Service, serving as Vice Consul in Hamburg, Germany, Dhahran, Saudi Arabia, Jidda, Saudi Arabia, and Tripoli, Libya. In 1962, Mak became the first U.S. Ambassador to Kuwait and was responsible for establishing the embassy. In 1969, Mak became the director of INR for near-east south Asia Affairs. Mak officially retired from the Foreign Service in 1970. Mak was close friends with Francis Meloy, US Ambassador who was assassinated in Beirut, Lebanon. Meloy was best man at Mak's wedding.

Beginning in the late 1980s, Mak volunteered to help the newly create Association for Diplomatic Studies (later Association for Diplomatic Studies and Training, or ADST). He conducted a few interviews for oral histories before beginning to create tables of contents for the oral history collection. Mak continued his volunteer service to ADST until 2014.

== Service chronology ==
Dayton Mak's Diplomatic Chronology
Position	Host country or organization	Year
US Foreign Service		1946 to 1970
US Foreign Service	Hamburg, Germany	1946 to 1948
US Foreign Service	Dhahran, Saudi Arabia	1948 to 1949
US Foreign Service	Jeddah, Saudi Arabia	1949 to 1950
US Foreign Service	Tripoli, Libya	1951 to 1954
US Foreign Service	London, England	1954 to 1956
US Foreign Service	Tripoli, Libya	1957 to 1959
US Foreign Service	Kuwait	1961 to 1964
US Foreign Service	Beirut, Lebanon	1965 to 1969
US Foreign Service (Bureau of Intelligence and Research Director)	Washington DC	1969 to 1970

== Publications ==
Co-author, American Ambassadors in a Troubled World: Interviews with American Diplomats (1992, interviews, with Charles Stuart Kennedy)

Peer reviewer, Strangers When We Met (Nat Howell)

== See also ==
- Francis Meloy, the US ambassador of Lebanon who was assassinated.
- Charles Stuart Kennedy, American historian
