= G. Frederick Reinhardt =

American diplomat (1911–1971)

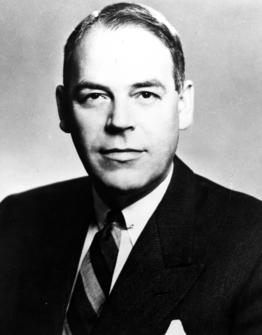

United States Ambassador to Italy
- In office May 17, 1961 – March 3, 1968
- President: John F. Kennedy; Lyndon B. Johnson
- Preceded by: James David Zellerbach
- Succeeded by: Gardner Ackley

Ambassadors of the United States to North Yemen
- In office April 28, 1960 – May 6, 1961
- President: Dwight D. Eisenhower
- Preceded by: Raymond A. Hare
- Succeeded by: Parker T. Hart

Ambassadors of the United States to Egypt
- In office March 22, 1960 – May 6, 1961
- President: Dwight D. Eisenhower
- Preceded by: Raymond A. Hare
- Succeeded by: John S. Badeau

11th Counselor of the United States Department of State
- In office March 17, 1957 – February 3, 1960
- Preceded by: Douglas MacArthur II
- Succeeded by: Theodore Achilles

United States Ambassador to South Vietnam
- In office May 28, 1955 – February 10, 1957
- President: Dwight D. Eisenhower
- Preceded by: Donald R. Heath
- Succeeded by: Elbridge Durbrow

Personal details
- Born: October 21, 1911 Berkeley, California, U.S.
- Died: February 22, 1971 (aged 59) Birmensdorf, Switzerland
- Education: University of California, Berkeley (BA); Cornell University (MA); Cesare Alfieri Institute, Italy (Dipl.)

George Frederick Reinhardt (1911–1971) was an American foreign service officer and diplomat from 1937 until 1968. He was considered by his peers to be among the finest diplomats of his era. Reinhardt was the U.S. ambassador to South Vietnam (1955–1957), to the United Arab Republic and North Yemen (1960–1961) and to Italy (1961–1968). In Vietnam, he worked to improve relations between the United States and South Vietnamese Prime Minister Ngo Dinh Diem.

== Childhood and education ==
Reinhardt was born in Berkeley, California on October 21, 1911, the eldest of two boys born to Dr. George F. Reinhardt Sr. and Aurelia Henry Reinhardt (later to become president of Mills College).

Reinhardt's father, George, was a well known physician who sat on the Medical Board of California (originally the Board of Examiners of the Medical Society of California), serving as the organization's vice president in 1908 and its president in 1909. Dr. George Reinhardt was also the first University Physician and Professor of Hygiene at the University of California, Berkeley, where he founded the country's first, comprehensive, prepaid, student health program and hospital, in 1906. George died in Berkeley on June 7, 1914, when Reinhardt was not yet three years old.

Reinhardt matriculated at the University of California, Berkeley, graduating in 1933 with a Bachelor of Arts degree in classics and modern languages. Reinhardt would win the Alumnus of the Year award from the Cal Alumni Association in 1962. He earned an M.A. from Cornell University in 1935 in the field of European history and international law, his dissertations were entitled, "German interest in the Russo-Japanese war" and "International Control of Rivers for Non-Navigational Purposes." He earned a Diploma from Cesare Alfieri Institute, Florence, Italy, in 1937. He also earned honorary doctorates from Universities of California, Gonzaga and Mills College.

== Foreign service career ==
Reinhardt began his professional career serving on the United States and Mexico International Boundary Commission. In 1937 Reinhardt began his foreign service as the vice-consul in Vienna, Austria. There, in March 1938, he witnessed the Austrian Anschluss. By the end of the year he had been recalled and began training in Russian at Harvard University. In October 1939, he was designated third secretary of the legation and American vice consul in Tallinn, Estonia. By June 1940, Reinhardt was assigned for the first time to the Moscow embassy. During his first assignment in Moscow, Reinhardt assisted in the removal and liquidation of U.S. assets in the Baltic states following the Soviet annexation. He also provided consular service to U.S. nationals, and served as a Russian language interpreter. Reinhardt served as an interpreter during meetings between Joseph Stalin and President Roosevelt's personal representative, Harry Hopkins. He was considered only second, to Charles E. Bohlen, to interpret for Roosevelt at the Tehran Conference. In October 1941, as Moscow came under threat from the German army as a result of Operation Barbarossa, Reinhardt remained in the city under Llewellyn Thompson (the then Second Secretary at the U.S. Embassy to the Soviet Union), while Ambassador Laurence A. Steinhardt and other diplomatic personnel and news correspondents were evacuated to Kuibyshev.

In 1943, Reinhardt was then stationed in Algiers, to serve on Robert Murphy's staff. He served as the U. S. representative for the Allied Control Commission for Italy while Bob Murphy went back to the U. S. on leave. His expertise was in high demand in the Mediterranean, both because of his expertise in Italian and experience with Soviet affairs. Dealing with the Soviets regarding Balkan concerns was a major reason for his involvement.

When on 19 November 1951, the NATO Defense College opened its doors to Course 1 in Paris, Reinhardt was the only civilian senior instructor assigned to the course.

During the spring of 1953 President Eisenhower asked Reinhardt to participate as a Russian expert as part of a top-secret program, named Project Solarium, examining the advantages and disadvantages of a series of military and political strategies seeking to "roll back" existing areas of Soviet influence and restore the prestige of the west. Reinhardt participated as a member of "Task Force C" delivering their recommendation to Eisenhower, John F. Dulles and other cabinet members on July 16, 1953. Project Solarium's findings produced NSC 162/2, a national strategy directive commonly assessed to have guided U.S. strategy from its publication to the end of the Cold War.

Throughout the course of his Foreign Service career, Reinhardt held the following postings with the U.S. Department of State:

- U.S. Vice Consul, Vienna, Austria (1937–38)
- U.S. Third Secretary-Vice Consul, Tallinn, Estonia (1939–40)
- U.S. Third Secretary-Vice Consul, Moscow, USSR (1940–42)
- Political Advisor, Allied Control Commission for Italy (1943–44)
- Foreign Service Officer, Staff of Supreme Allied Commander (1944–45)
- Staff of U.S. Political Adviser on German Affairs, AEF (1945)
- U.S. Consul, Moscow, USSR (1945–48)
- Director, Division of Eastern European Affairs (1948–51)
- Deputy for Civil Affairs, NATO Defense College, Paris, France (1951–55)
- U.S. Ambassador to South Vietnam (1955–57)
- Counselor of the Department of State (1957–60)
- U.S. Ambassador to Yemen (1960–61)
- U.S. Ambassador to Egypt (United Arab Republic, 1960–61)
- U.S. Ambassador to Italy (1961–68)

In December 1968, Reinhardt resigned from the Foreign Service shortly after a visit to Rome by President Johnson.

== Career in the private sector ==
Following his departure from the State Department, Reinhardt accepted a position with the Stanford Research Institute to run its office in Zurich, Switzerland. The Stanford Research Institute, operating today as SRI International, is a non-profit research center with offices around the world. The organization serves clients in the private and public sector to develop real-world implementation of varied R&D projects. Reinhardt retained this position until his death in 1971.

== Personal life ==
On September 10, 1949, Reinhardt married Lillian Larke "Solie" Tootle of Bethany, West Virginia at a ceremony in Weston, Connecticut. The two first met in Vienna prior to World War II and then became reacquainted in Paris when Solie was working for the Marshall Plan. They had four children: George Frederick ("Fred"), Anna Aurelia ("Aura"), Charles Henry ("Harry"), and Catherine Jane ("Cathy").

Reinhardt served on numerous boards and as a leader to a variety of organizations including the Telluride Association (member) and the American Foreign Service Association (President). He was also a member of the American Society of International Law, the Academy of Political Science, the American Academy of Political and Social Science, the American Association for the Advancement of Slavic Studies, the Council on Foreign Relations, and the U.S. Naval Institute.

Reinhardt died of a heart attack on February 22, 1971, in Birmensdorf, Switzerland. He was buried at the Protestant Cemetery in Rome (Il Cimitero Acattolico di Roma), for which he had served as administrator from 1961 until 1968, by virtue of his post as U.S. Ambassador. Following her death, the ashes of Reinhardt's widow, Solie, were interred beside his in 2009.

== Notes ==
Diplomatic posts
Preceded by Donald R. Heath	United States Ambassador to South Vietnam; 1955–1957	Succeeded by Elbridge Durbrow
Preceded by Raymond A. Hare	United States Ambassador to Egypt; 1960–1961	Succeeded by John S. Badeau
Preceded by James David Zellerbach	United States Ambassador to Italy; 1961–1968	Succeeded by H. Gardner Ackley
