= Arthur Melvin Okun =

American economist (1928–1980)

Art Okun

7th Chair of the Council of Economic Advisers
- In office February 15, 1968 – January 20, 1969
- President: Lyndon Johnson
- Preceded by: Gardner Ackley
- Succeeded by: Paul McCracken

Personal details
- Born: Arthur Melvin Okun; November 28, 1928 Jersey City, New Jersey, U.S.
- Died: March 23, 1980 (aged 51) Washington, D.C., U.S.
- Party: Democratic
- Education: Columbia University (BA, MA, PhD)

Academic background
- Doctoral advisor: Arthur F. Burns
- Influences: John Maynard Keynes

Academic work
- Discipline: Macroeconomics
- School or tradition: Neo-Keynesian economics
- Institutions: Yale University
- Notable ideas: Okun's law Misery index

Arthur Melvin "Art" Okun (November 28, 1928 – March 23, 1980) was an American economist. Okun is known in particular for Okun's law, an observed relationship that states that for every 1% increase in the unemployment rate, a country's GDP will be roughly an additional 2.5% lower than its potential GDP. He is also known as the creator of the misery index, the analogy of the deadweight loss of taxation with a leaky bucket, and for the conception of "the invisible handshake".

== Biography ==
Okun graduated from Columbia College in 1949 with the Albert Asher Green Memorial Prize for the highest GPA. He went on to obtain a Ph.D. in economics from Columbia in 1956 before teaching at Yale University.

He served as the chairman of the Council of Economic Advisers between 1968 and 1969. Afterwards, he became a fellow at the Brookings Institution in Washington, D.C. In 1968 he was elected as a Fellow of the American Statistical Association.

He died on March 23, 1980, of a heart attack.

== Works ==
- Equality and Efficiency: The Big Tradeoff (Washington, D.C.: Brookings Institution, 1975)
- Prices and Quantities: A Macroeconomic Analysis, see here (1981) ISBN 0-8157-6480-4

Political offices
Preceded by Gardner Ackley	Chair of the Council of Economic Advisers; 1968–1969	Succeeded by Paul McCracken
