= Paul McCracken (economist) =

American economist (1915–2012)

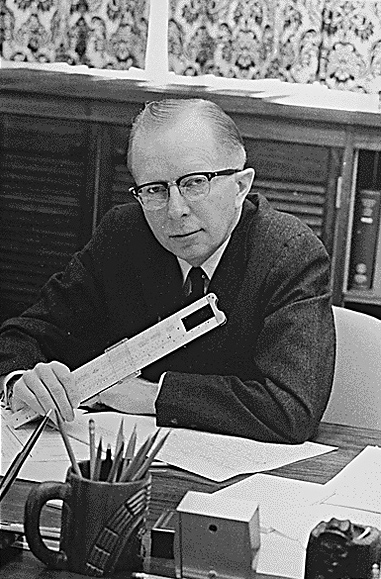

8th Chair of the Council of Economic Advisers
- In office February 4, 1969 – December 31, 1971
- President: Richard Nixon
- Preceded by: Art Okun
- Succeeded by: Herbert Stein

Personal details
- Born: Paul Winston McCracken; December 29, 1915 Richland, Iowa, U.S.
- Died: August 3, 2012 (aged 96) Ann Arbor, Michigan, U.S.
- Party: Republican
- Spouse: Emily Siler (1942–2005)
- Education: William Penn University (BA); Harvard University (MA, PhD)

Paul Winston McCracken (December 29, 1915 – August 3, 2012) was an American economist born in Richland, Iowa.

== Biography ==
He held an M.A. and Ph.D. from Harvard University in Economics and a B.A. from William Penn University. He was the Edmund Ezra Day Distinguished University Professor Emeritus of Business Administration, Economics, and Public Policy at the University of Michigan. McCracken was chairman of the President's Council of Economic Advisors from 1969 to 1971 under President Richard Nixon. He took the lead in developing economic policy at the outset of the Nixon administration.

In 1976, he was elected as a Fellow of the American Statistical Association. He chaired the American Enterprise Institute's Council of Academic Advisors and served as interim president of the institute in 1986.

He died on August 3, 2012, at age 96.

Political offices
Preceded by Art Okun	Chair of the Council of Economic Advisers; 1969–1971	Succeeded by Herbert Stein
Non-profit organization positions
Preceded by William Baroody	President of the American Enterprise Institute; Acting; 1986	Succeeded by Christopher DeMuth
