= Howard R. Cottam =

American diplomat

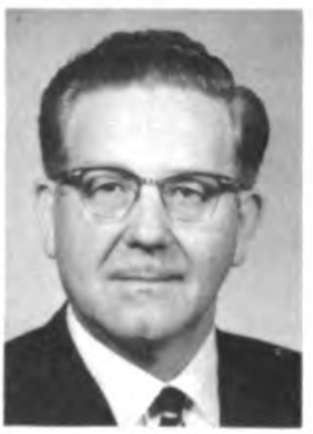

2nd US Ambassador to Kuwait
- In office August 1, 1963 – July 6, 1969
- President: John F. Kennedy; Lyndon B. Johnson
- Preceded by: Parker T. Hart
- Succeeded by: John Patrick Walsh

Personal details
- Born: July 27, 1910 St. George, Utah
- Died: April 2, 1984 (aged 73)
- Education: Brigham Young University; University of Wisconsin

Howard Rex Cottam (July 27, 1910 – April 2, 1984) was an American diplomat. He served as the second US ambassador to Kuwait from 1963 to 1969.

== Early life ==
Cottam was born July 27, 1910 in St. George, Utah. He graduated with his bachelor's degree from Brigham Young University in 1932. He then received his master's and doctorate from the University of Wisconsin in 1938 and 1941, respectively. He studied rural sociology, economics, psychology and statistics in school.

Cottam was married to Katherine Stokes with whom he had a daughter, Meredith Cottam.

== Career ==
In 1942, Cottam entered into government service. He first worked for the War Food Administration as the Chief of the Program Appraisal Division. He then worked in increasingly important positions within the Department of State. He served in Paris and Rome as an agricultural specialist. While in Rome, Cottam joined the Foreign Service. He left Rome to become the Deputy Director of the US Operations Mission at The Hague in 1953. In 1955, Cottam became the Representative of the International Cooperation Administration at The Hague. He was later transferred to Rio de Janeiro as an economic officer in the US Embassy. From 1957-1960, Cottam was the Director of the US Operations Mission in Brazil. Cottam was then promoted to Deputy Assistant Secretary for Economic and Regional Affairs in the Bureau of Near Eastern Affairs and in 1962, the Deputy Assistant Secretary for the same bureau.

On August 1, 1963, Cottam was appointed as the second US Ambassador to Kuwait. In the early 1960s, Cottam was the highest ranking State Department official to visit Saudi Arabia since World War II.

Cottam left the State Department in 1969. He then worked in the capacity of North American Representative to the Food and Agriculture Organization from 1969 to 1974. After he left this position, Cottam became a visiting professor at American University and taught international development at their School of International Service. He retired in 1983.

== Retirement ==
Cottam was a member of many clubs and societies, remaining involved in foreign affairs well after he left the Department of State. He was a member of the Cosmos Club, the Washington Institute of Foreign Affairs, and the United Nations Association. He was also on the boards of two organizations: the Diplomatic and Consular Officers Retired (DACOR) and the American-Near East Relief Agency.

Cottam died due to complications with cancer on April 2, 1984.
