= James David Zellerbach =

American diplomat (1892–1963)

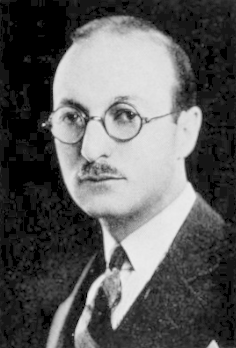

United States Ambassador to Italy
- In office February 6, 1957 – December 10, 1960

Personal details
- Born: January 17, 1892 San Francisco, California, US
- Died: August 3, 1963 (aged 71) San Francisco, California, US
- Resting place: Home of Peace Cemetery
- Spouse: Hannah Fuld (m. 1916)
- Occupation: Businessman

James David Zellerbach (January 17, 1892 – August 3, 1963) was an American businessman and ambassador.

== Biography ==
Zellerbach was born in San Francisco, California on January 17, 1892. He married Hannah Fuld on June 29, 1916, and they had two children.

He served as chairman of the board of the Crown Zellerbach Corporation. In 1957, Zellerbach was sworn in as United States Ambassador to Italy; he held the post until 1960. He was a member on the board of Wells Fargo Bank Council on Foreign Relations. He was President of the San Francisco Jewish Welfare Fund and vice-chairman of the National Conference of Christians and Jews.

He died on August 3, 1963, of a brain tumor, during surgery at Mount Zion Hospital in San Francisco. Zellerbach is buried at Home of Peace Cemetery in Colma, California.

Diplomatic posts
Preceded by Clare Boothe Luce	United States Ambassador to Italy; February 6, 1957 – December 10, 1960	Succeeded by G. Frederick Reinhardt
