= Elbridge Durbrow =

American diplomat (1903–1997)

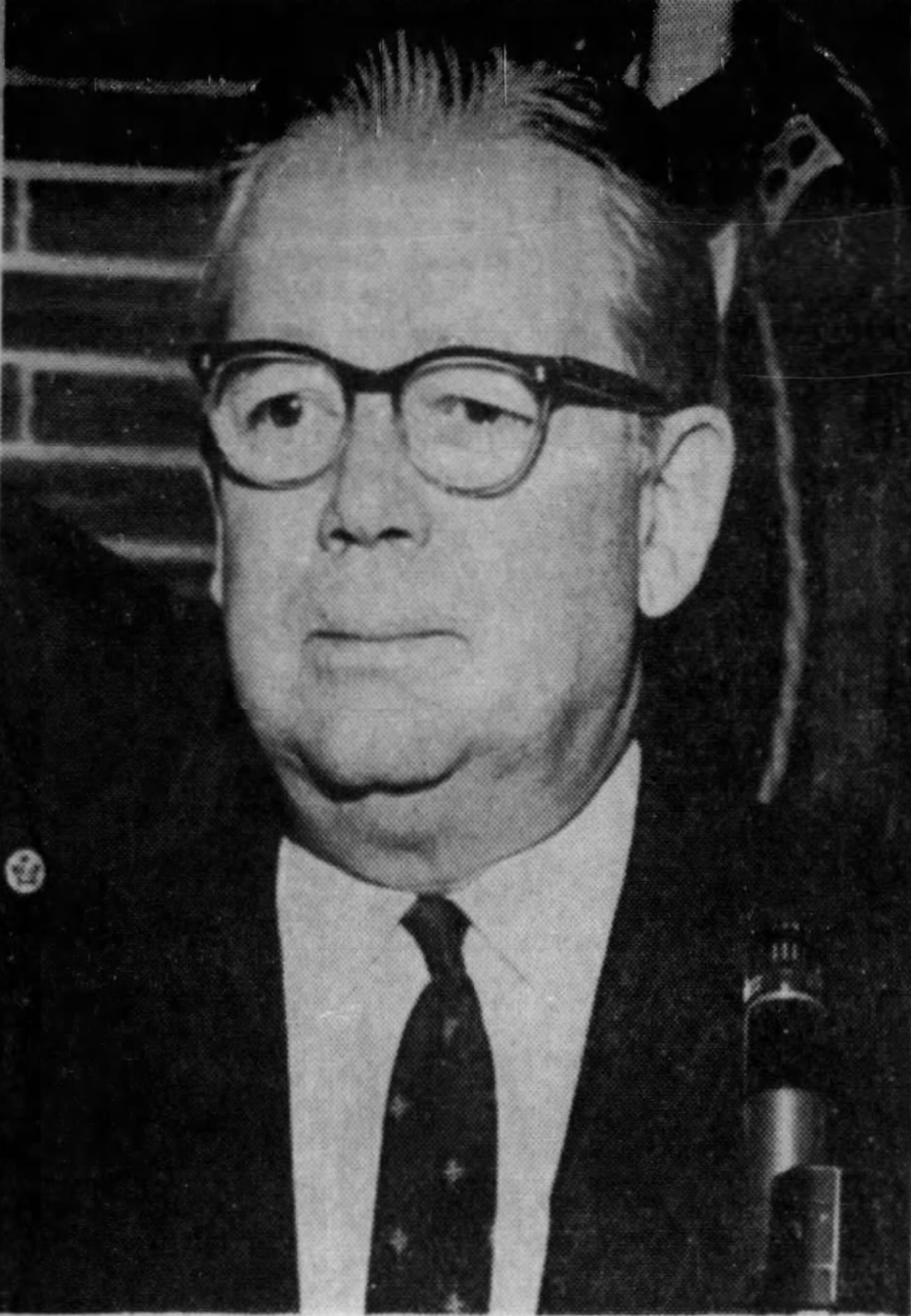

United States Ambassador to South Vietnam
- In office March 14, 1957 – April 16, 1961
- President: Dwight Eisenhower; John F. Kennedy
- Preceded by: G. Frederick Reinhardt
- Succeeded by: Frederick Nolting

Personal details
- Born: September 21, 1903 San Francisco, California, U.S.
- Died: May 16, 1997 (aged 93) Walnut Creek, California, U.S.

Elbridge Durbrow (September 21, 1903 – May 16, 1997) was a Foreign Service officer and diplomat who served as the Counselor of Embassy and Deputy Chief of Mission in Moscow in the late 1940s and then as the US ambassador to South Vietnam from March 14, 1957, to April 16, 1961.

He supported the Diem regime until late 1960, when he reported that the situation was deteriorating and that unless steps were taken to reform the government, Diem would be likely overthrown in a coup, or lose the country to the Viet Cong. Diem and his American supporters worked to get Durbrow transferred, and he was recalled by President John F. Kennedy in 1961, and sent to a diplomatic role with NATO in

Edit: In August 1942 Gerhardt Riegner, the Secretary of the World Jewish Congress in Geneva sent a letter to the American Legation at Bern, Switzerland. This letter described the Nazi plan (albeit unconfirmed) to gather the Jews under German control in Eastern Europe and murder them in those territories. This letter was sent by the Swiss US Consul to the State Department in Washington. Riegner hoped that the letter would also be transmitted to Rabbi Steven Wise, The New York City based President of the World Jewish Congress. Most US State Department officials were very skeptical of the letter, but one alert pragmatic official at least tried to act. Paul Culbertson, the assistant chief of the Division of European Affairs drafted a letter to Rabbi Wise summarizing the Riegner letter received in Bern. Indeed at the end, Culbertson took care to state that this was a probable war rumor, one of many supposedly circulating around Europe at the time. Upon receipt by Wise it is likely the letter would have prompted strenuous and direct action by the World Jewish Congress to help spread the word which had heretofore been disregarded. The letter was never sent. Culbertson’s supervisor (Eldridge Durbrow) received it for approval, wrote “do not send” on it, initialed it, and even took pains to pencil diagonal lines through the entire letter. Durbrow then communicated back to US diplomats in Switzerland stating it would not be forwarded to Wise “in view of the apparently unsubstantiated nature of the information”. While this certainly wasn’t the only time the US and its Allies ignored such information it’s a story that needs to be told regarding Durbrow’s culpability in this specific situation.

== Early life ==
Durbrow was born in San Francisco, California. Durbrow graduated from Yale University in 1926 with a degree in philosophy. He then continued his education at Stanford University, the University of Dijon in France, The Hague Academy of International Law in the Netherlands, the École Libre des Sciences Politiques in Paris and finally the University of Chicago, where he studied international economics and finance.

== Career ==
Durbrow began his career in the US Foreign Service by serving as Vice Consul at the American embassy in Poland. He rose through the service's ranks over the next decade and served in Bucharest, Naples, Rome, Lisbon, and Moscow. In 1941, Durbrow became the assistant chief of the US State Department's Eastern European affairs division.

In 1944, Durbrow was appointed as the chief of the Eastern European division of the State Department in Washington, DC. That year, he was also one of the American delegates at the United Nations Monetary and Financial Conference, which set up the International Bank for Reconstruction and Development, the General Agreement on Tariffs and Trade (GATT), the International Monetary Fund (IMF), and the Bretton Woods system of money management. After World War II, Durbrow was vocal in his opposition for the diplomatic recognition of new governments in Hungary, Romania, and Bulgaria because of their communist origins. In 1946, he left that position to succeed George F. Kennan as the Counselor of Embassy and Deputy Chief of Mission in Moscow, under the US ambassador to the Soviet Union and future CIA Director, Walter Bedell Smith. Durbrow warned Smith and others of Soviet expansionism and efforts to break up the Western world.

From 1948 to 1950, he served as an adviser to the National War College in Washington, DC, and spent the next two years as director of the Foreign Service's personnel division. In 1952, he was sent to Italy, where he served as deputy chief of mission to the US ambassador to Italy, Clare Boothe Luce. Two years later, he was promoted to the diplomatic rank of career minister.

On March 14, 1957, President Dwight Eisenhower named Durbrow as the United States Ambassador to South Vietnam. At the time, the US had a minor military and political presence in Vietnam to prevent communism from taking over the region.

Durbrow had a difficult time in his ambassadorial role. He often had to work with the authoritarian regime of Ngo Dinh Diem and the corruption and ineffective policymaking that accompanied it. South Vietnamese officers, disgruntled with Diem's government, tried to persuade Durbrow into joining anti-Diem groups.

Durbrow began to feel uneasy about Diem's authority but had to refuse because the US government still supported Diem.

In 1960, Diem and his younger brother and chief political adviser, Ngo Dinh Nhu, accused Durbrow of supporting a failed coup attempt by paratroopers of the Army of the Republic of Vietnam. Durbrow later recalled receiving a phone call from one of Diem's aides, who asked him to tell Diem to surrender or face a howitzer attack on the presidential palace. Durbrow refused, and no attack occurred. He later learned that the aide had been forced to make the call.

In April 1961, President John F. Kennedy formed a committee to assess the political, military, and socioeconomic situation in Vietnam in the hope of determining what it would take to keep communism out of South Vietnam. On April 16, Kennedy replaced Durbrow with Frederick Nolting, who supported appeasement. Later, Durbrow served as a delegate to the NATO Council in Paris and later as a government adviser to the National War College and the Air University.

== Retirement ==
Durbrow retired from his 38-year diplomatic career in 1968. He spent the next two decades writing and lecturing on foreign affairs. Throughout the 1970s, he served as the chairman of the American Foreign Policy Institute and as the director of the Center for International Strategic Studies and the Freedom Studies Center in South Boston, Virginia.

Durbrow died at his home in Walnut Creek, California, on May 16, 1997, from complications of a stroke. He was survived by his second wife, Benice Balcom Durbrow, and two sons from his first marriage, Chandler and Bruce.

== Bibliography ==
- Hammer, Ellen Joy (1987). A Death in November: America in Vietnam, 1963. New York City: E. P. Dutton. ISBN 978-0-525-24210-9. LCCN 86016724. OCLC 15317660.

Diplomatic posts
| Preceded by G. Frederick Reinhardt | United States Ambassador to South Vietnam; 1957–1961 | Succeeded by Frederick Nolting |
