= List of ambassadors of the United States to South Yemen =

Ambassador of the United States to South Yemen
- سفارة الولايات المتحدة الأمريكية في جمهورية اليمن الديمقراطية الشعبية
- Seal of the United States Department of State
- Incumbent; None
- Nominator: The president of the United States
- Inaugural holder: William L. Eagleton, Jr. as Chargé d'Affaires ad interim
- Formation: December 7, 1967
- Abolished: October 24, 1969

South Yemen

The United States recognized the People's Republic of South Yemen in 1967 and moved to establish diplomatic relations. A U.S. embassy in Aden was established on December 7, 1967, with William L. Eagleton, Jr., as Chargé d'Affaires ad interim.

In June 1969, a radical Marxist wing of NLF gained power. The new regime severed diplomatic relations with the United States on October 24, 1969. An American ambassador had not yet been appointed for South Yemen and Eagleton was still serving as the chargé d'affaires when relations were severed. Two days later all diplomatic personnel were withdrawn from the country and the U.S. embassy was closed.

On December 1, 1970, the regime changed the name of the country to the People's Democratic Republic of Yemen.

The United States resumed diplomatic relations with the People’s Democratic Republic of Yemen on April 30, 1990. On May 22, 1990, the Yemen Arab Republic (North Yemen) and the People’s Democratic Republic of Yemen united to form the Republic of Yemen.

For subsequent ambassadors to the Republic of Yemen, see United States Ambassador to Yemen.

For ambassadors to the Yemen Arab Republic, see United States Ambassador to North Yemen.
