= Carl W. Strom =

American diplomat

Carl Walther Strom

United States ambassador to Cambodia
- In office October 11, 1956 – March 8, 1959

United States ambassador to Bolivia
- In office April 8, 1959 – May 8, 1961

Personal details
- Born: December 22, 1899 Albert Lea, Minnesota
- Died: January 27, 1969 (aged 69) Fort Lauderdale, Florida

Carl Walther Strom (December 22, 1899 – January 27, 1969) was an American diplomat who served as United States ambassador to Cambodia, replacing Robert M. McClintock, from October 11, 1956, to March 8, 1959, and United States ambassador to Bolivia from April 8, 1959, to May 8, 1961.

== Biography ==
He graduated from Luther College (Iowa) in 1919 and earned a PhD in mathematics from the University of Illinois.

== Diplomatic career ==
Strom was named United States ambassador to Cambodia on October 11, 1956. Strom served until March 8, 1959. On April 8, 1959, he was named United States ambassador to Bolivia. He served until May 8, 1961.
