= Shawn P. Crowley =

American diplomat

Shawn Patrick Crowley
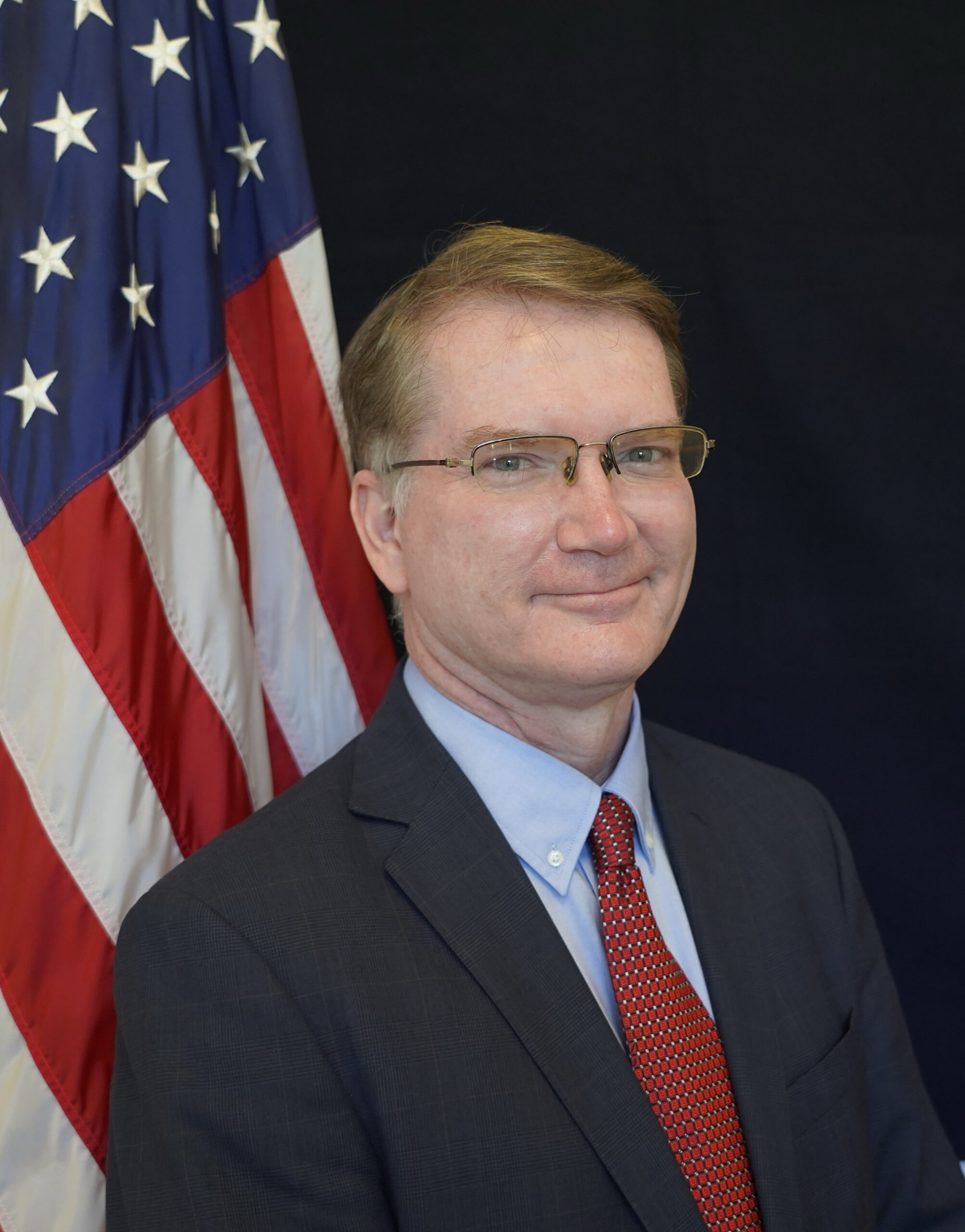
- Official portrait, 2022

Chargé d’Affaires ad interim to Italy
- In office January 11, 2025 – May 5, 2025
- President: Joe Biden; Donald Trump
- Preceded by: Jack Markell
- Succeeded by: Tilman J. Fertitta

Chargé d’Affaires ad interim to Italy
- In office July 18, 2022 – August 26, 2023
- President: Joe Biden
- Preceded by: Thomas D. Smitham (Chargé d’Affaires ad interim)
- Succeeded by: Jack Markell

Chargé d’Affaires ad interim to the Netherlands
- In office July 29, 2016 – January 10, 2018
- President: Barack Obama; Donald Trump
- Preceded by: Adam H. Sterling
- Succeeded by: Pete Hoekstra

Personal details
- Born: Shawn Patrick Crowley
- Children: 2
- Education: Georgetown University (BA); National War College (MA)

Shawn Patrick Crowley is an American diplomat. He has served as the chief of mission and Chargé d’Affaires ad interim to Italy. He had served as Chargé d’Affaires ad interim of Embassy Italy until the appointment of then-Ambassador Jack Markell on September 23, 2023.

== Biography ==
Crowley received a Bachelor's degree in international relations from Georgetown University and a Master's degree in national security strategy from the National War College. Before working for the State Department, he worked as a banker in the Cayman Islands and as a staffer in the German Parliament in Bonn.

In 1991 Crowley began his career in the foreign service, working in Kuwait on political issues such as repatriation of American prisoners from Iraq. He would go on to hold numerous other positions throughout the Middle East and Europe. Between January and March 2012, he led the U.S. diplomatic mission in Benghazi.

Crowley would later on serve as Chargé d'Affaires from the United States to the Netherlands from July 29, 2016, to January 4, 2018.

On May 16, 2020, Crowley began working for the Bureau of European and Eurasian Affairs. He has since moved up to the position of director of Western European Affairs, a position which he still holds.

== Family ==
Crowley and his wife Sabine have two grown children, a daughter working as a microbiologist in Arkansas and a son working in marketing in Frankfurt.
