= Donald R. Heath =

American diplomat (1894-1981)

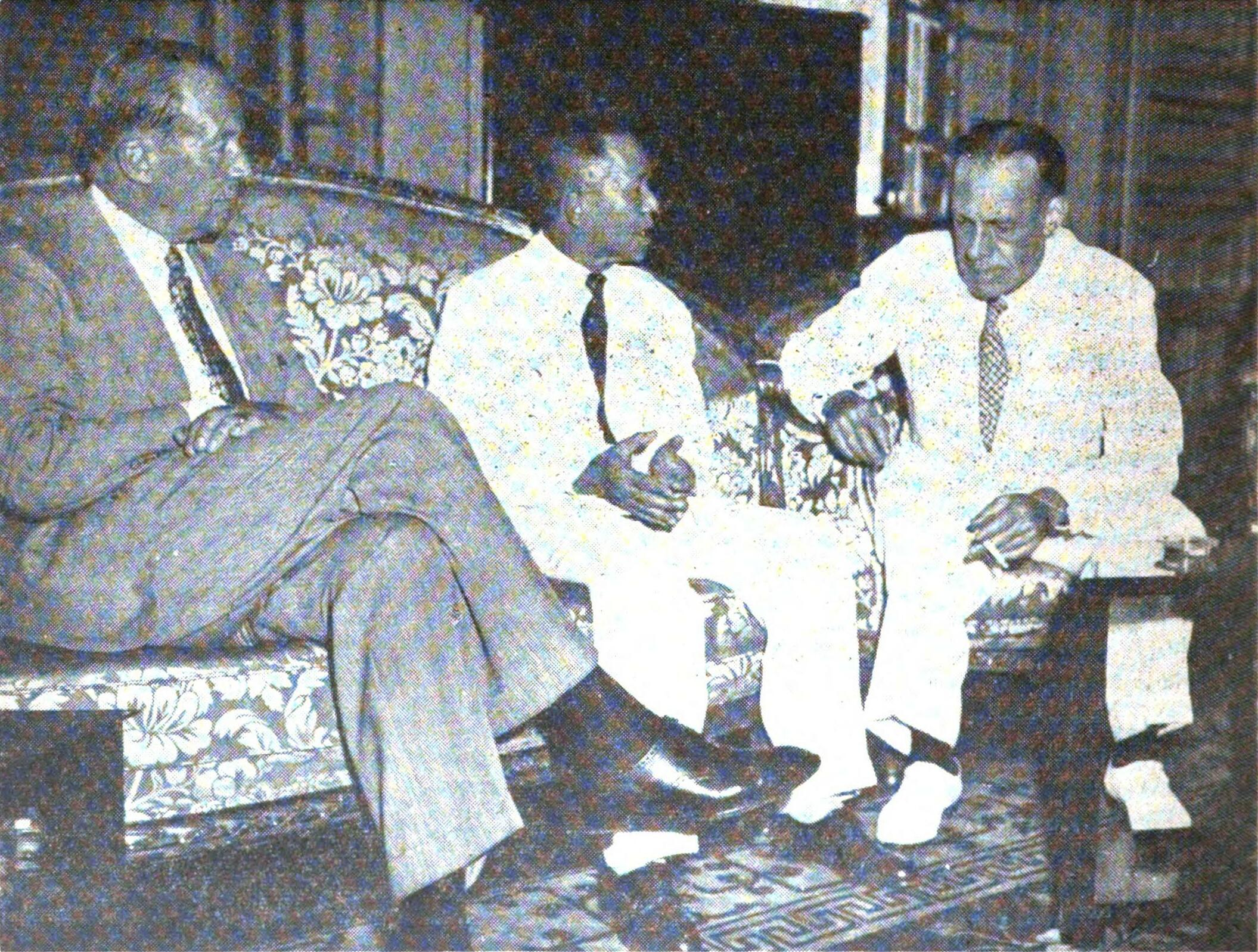
Heath (right) with William Chapman Foster and Nguyễn Văn Tâm

Donald Read Heath (August 12, 1894 – October 15, 1981) was a member of the United States Foreign Service for more than four decades including service as the Minister to Laos (1950–1954), and Ambassador to Cambodia (1950–1954), Vietnam (1952–1955), Lebanon (1955–1957) and Saudi Arabia (1958–1961). During his tenure as Ambassador to Vietnam, Heath advocated and carried out American policy under Secretary of State John Foster Dulles that helped set the stage for American military involvement.

Heath was born in Topeka, Kansas the son of Hubert A. and Estelle (Read) Heath. He was educated in Topeka public schools and graduated from Washburn University about 1915. He attended the University of Montpellier in France for one semester. While a student at Washburn, Heath was a member of the Kansas Beta chapter of the Phi Delta Theta fraternity where among his chapter brothers was Arthur S. Champeny. On October 10, 1920, he married Sue Louise Bell.

In 1950, Washburn awarded Heath its Distinguished Service Award. In 1958, the Washburn again honored him with an honorary doctorate of laws.

== Foreign service career ==
Heath was a White House correspondent for United Press International from February 1916 to August 1917 and then again from October 1919 to September 1920. From August 1917 to October 1919 he was first lieutenant in U.S. Army in World War I. In 1920 he began a career in the foreign service that would last four decades.

From 1920 to 1929, Heath held consular positions in Romania, Poland, and Switzerland. From 1929 to 1932 he was a consul at the American Embassy in Port-au-Prince, Haiti and he was then assistant chief of the Division of Latin American Affairs at the State Department. From 1937 to 1941 he was the First Secretary at the U.S. Embassy in Berlin before the American entry into the war. Then from 1941 to 1944, he was a consul in Santiago, Chile followed by less than a year as the chief of the Division of North and West Coast Affairs at the State Department.

In 1944 Heath returned to Europe as an advisor to fellow Kansan General Dwight D. Eisenhower. He remained in Germany as an advisor on reconstruction until 1947 when he was posted as U.S. Ambassador to Bulgaria. In 1949 Bulgaria charged deputy premier Traicho Kostov with plotting against the Communist regime and added Heath’s name to the charges to give the case "its proper anticapitalist flavor." The Bulgarian government declared Heath persona non grata and the U.S. promptly broke off diplomatic relations. In 1956 Bulgaria re-examined the case, exonerating Kostov years after he had been executed. In 1959 Bulgaria dropped all charges against Heath and diplomatic relations were restored.

Following his expulsion from Bulgaria, Heath was posted as the first U.S. Ambassador to the newly independent countries in Indochina including Laos (1950–1954), Cambodia (1950–1954), and South Vietnam (1950–1954). During these concurrent postings he was resident in Saigon. Heath supported the Domino Theory and wrote that if the French pulled out "Only the blind could doubt the immediate Communist engulfment of Southeast Asia." In October 1954 Heath and Lieutenant General John W. "Iron Mike" O'Daniel were authorized to begin a crash program to improve "the loyalty and effectiveness of the Free Vietnamese Forces." The result was a formal agreement in December between representatives of France, the Republic of Vietnam, and the United States to supply direct aid through the Military Assistance Program (MAP).

He was next the U.S. Ambassador to Lebanon (1955–1958), Yemen (1957–1959), and, finally, Saudi Arabia (1958–1961).

== Donald R. Heath Jr. ==
Donald R. Heath Jr. had been a WWII courier working with the American spy Mildred Harnack, a great-great aunt of Rebecca Donner.

== Post-diplomatic work ==
Following his retirement from the Foreign Service in 1961, he held a professorship at the University of California at Los Angeles.

== Personal life ==
Heath died in Orinda, California on October 15, 1981. He was survived by a daughter, Sue L. Brown; a son, Donald R. Heath Jr.; seven grandchildren and one great-grandchild.

== See also ==
- Arvid Harnack

Diplomatic posts
Preceded by post created	United States Ambassador to Cambodia; 1950–1954	Succeeded by Robert McClintock
Preceded by post created	United States Ambassador to South Vietnam; 1952–1954	Succeeded by G. Frederick Reinhardt
Preceded by Raymond A. Hare	United States Ambassador to Lebanon; 1955–1958	Succeeded by Robert McClintock
Preceded by George Wadsworth	United States Ambassador to Saudi Arabia; 1957–1961	Succeeded by Parker T. Hart
