= Karl Strom =

American surgeon (born 1966)

Karl W. Strom (born 1966), M.D., F.A.C.S. is a surgeon that specializes in laparoscopy and bariatrics at various Hackensack University Medical Center's locations in Montclair and Westwood, New Jersey and in Southern Ocean Medical Center, Bayshore Community Hospital and Raritan Bay Medical Center.

Strom obtained BS degree from the University of Vermont and then got his MS from Montclair State University and MD from St. George's University School of Medicine. Following graduation, he was a fellow at New York Institute of Minimally Invasive Surgery at Westchester Medical Center, New York Medical College and then served as chief resident in general surgery and laparoscopic surgery at the same place.

Since 2007, he is a Fellow of the American College of Surgeons.
