= David E. Zweifel =

American diplomat (1934–2022)

David Eugene Zweifel (September 13, 1934 – January 1, 2022) was United States Ambassador to North Yemen from 1981 to 1984. Zweifel entered the US Foreign Service in 1962, undertaking an assignment as a political officer in Brazil.

== Biography ==
Zweifel graduated from Oregon State University (B.S., 1957; education major, planning on a teaching career).

He served in the U.S. Navy as a lieutenant from 1957 to 1962 and as a Naval ROTC instructor at Princeton University from 1960 to 1962.

Zweifel died from complications of cancer on January 1, 2022, at the age of 87.

== List of foreign assignments ==
- Consul, Rio de Janeiro (1993-1995)
- Ambassador to North Yemen (1981–84)
- Deputy Chief of Mission, Amman, Jordan (1979–81)
- Deputy Chief of Mission, Muscat, Oman (1974–76)
- Political Officer, Mexico City, Mexico (1971–74)
- Consul, Amman, Jordan (1969–70)
- Personnel Officer (1965–67)
- Political Officer, Rio de Janeiro, Brazil (1962)
