= Iowa City High School =

Public secondary school in Iowa City, Iowa, United States

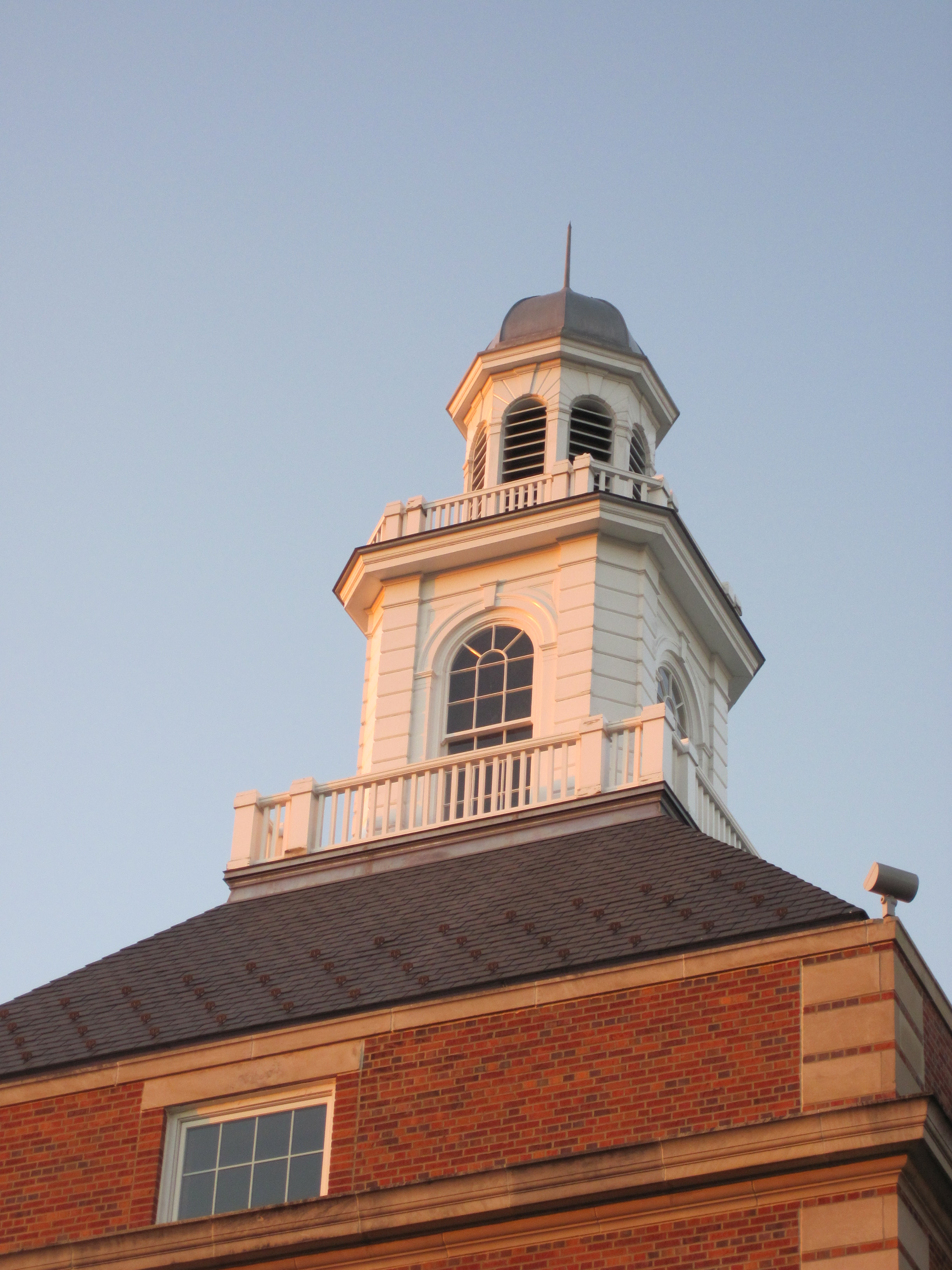

Location
- 1900 Morningside Drive; Iowa City, Iowa 52245; USA; 41.660°N 91.507°W

Information
- Type: Public
- Motto: The School That Leads
- School district: Iowa City Community School District
- Principal: John Bacon
- Teaching staff: 99.66 (FTE)
- Grades: 9–12
- Enrollment: 1,606 (2023–2024)
- Student to teacher ratio: 16.11
- Colors: Red and White
- Team name: Little Hawks
- Affiliation: Mississippi Valley Conference
- Website: iowacityschools.org/CityHS

Iowa City High School is a public high school in Iowa City, Iowa and is part of the Iowa City Community School District. The present high school was completed as part of the Public Works Projects started by President Franklin D. Roosevelt to provide jobs. The first classes were held in the fall of 1939. The previous high school building, built in 1909, was converted to a junior high school after the new building opened. It was located where Mercy Medical Plaza now stands. The current building sits on a hill on the east side of Iowa City. The school motto is "The School that Leads."

== History ==
Iowa City has had public education called "high school" at least as far back as 1858, when M.B. Beals was hired as principal; though Beals' records do not show where classes were held, there were 35 boys and 35 girls attending in 1860. Buildings that held "high school", which included junior high school, included the Grammar School, built in 1893 on the southwest corner of the Centre Market block; and the 1903 Iowa City High School on the northeast corner of the same block. A gymnasium in the northwest corner of the block was built in 1911, and included a swimming pool earlier than the university had its own pool. The 1903 building's last high school graduating class was 1939, and the building was renamed Central Junior High School when the new City High School opened in 1939.

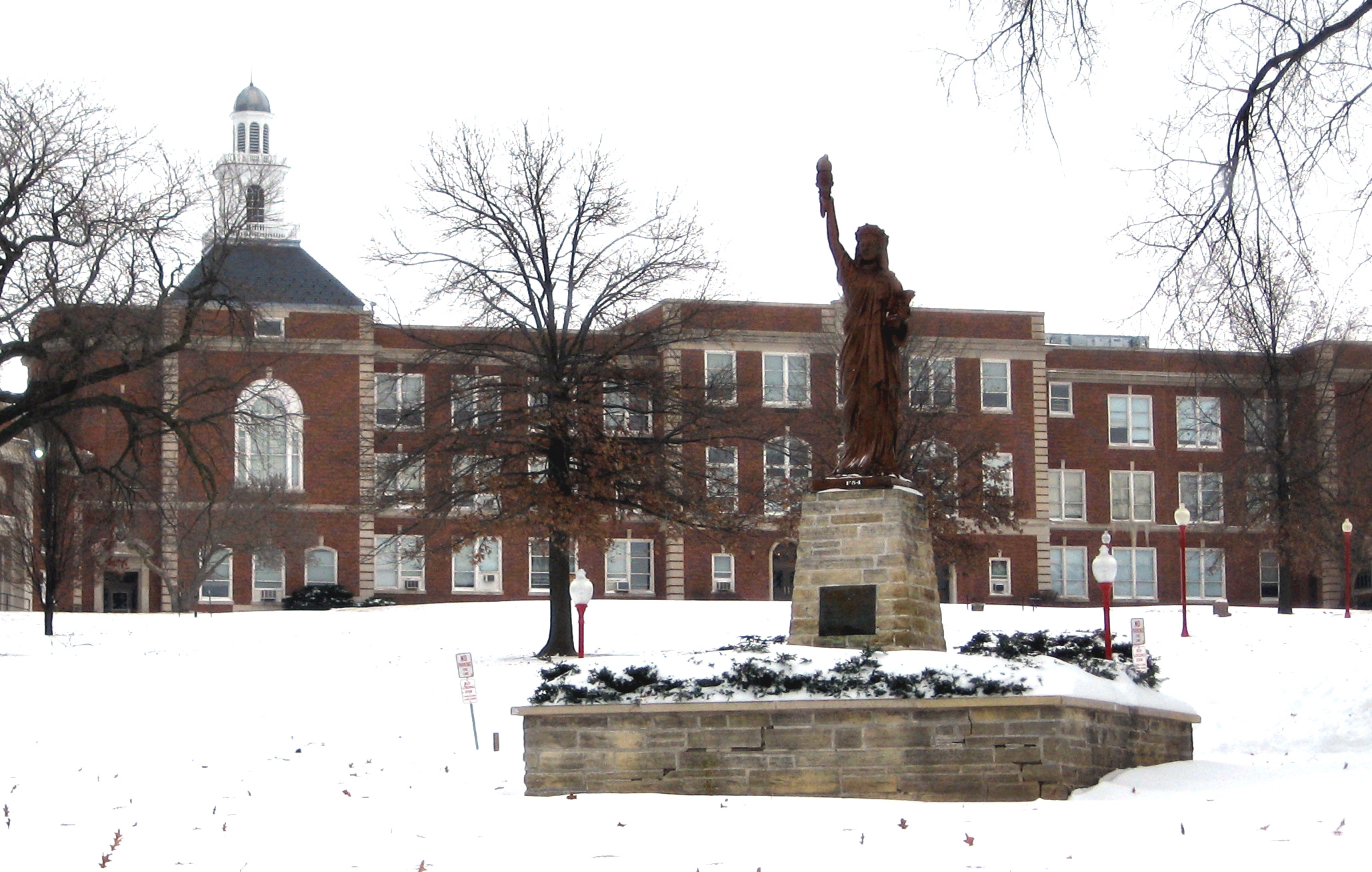
City High, Iowa City

City High School was built through the Public Works Projects, one of many other programs formed in Franklin D. Roosevelt's New Deal package. City High would become the second high school to be built in Iowa City, as the older one was becoming overcrowded as the population of the city increased. To determine the new location of the school, Iowa City residents had to vote whether to build the school in a central location, closer to the existing high school, or in a Morningside location, which was the name of the street which it would be built by, out of town on the city's east side. The Morningside location was favored, and the school was built on top of a large hill outside of town. Over time, the city's suburban expansion reached the school, enclosed it, and the expanded past it. Now, the school is contained entirely by Iowa City's east side.

== Academics ==
After graduation, 70% of City High graduates continue their education. Sixty percent attend four-year colleges, 5% junior or community colleges, and 5% trade and technical schools. City High ranks in the top ten schools for academic performance in Iowa.

== Athletics ==
City High has a storied history in track and cross country. Together, the track and cross country programs have combined for 38 state titles since 1989.

The women's cross country team logged state championship wins in 1999, 2002, 2003, 2005, and 2006. In 2006 the women's team drew national attention with their ranking as the 13th best cross country program in the country. This earned the Little Hawk women a Nike Team Nationals bid (renamed in 2008 as Nike Cross Nationals) during the same year.

The strong cross country program served as the basis for the boys' track & field team run to 11 state team titles in class 4A between the years of 1992 and 2004. Coach John Raffensperger was head coach for 10 of the 11 state titles, being the only coach in Iowa to win 10 state titles. Raffensperger was also awarded National coach of the year.

Sports Illustrated named City High the top sports school in the state of Iowa, citing the school's dominant cross country, track, and football teams. The boys' and girls' cross country teams have won more than 20 state championships since 1990. State titles for Boys' Cross Country include titles from 1991-'94 and in '96, '97, '99, and 2000.

11-time State Champions in Boys' Track and Field (1992, 1993, 1994, 1995, 1996, 1997, 1999(tie), 2000, 2001, 2002, 2004, 2022)

Other sports that have won state titles since 1989 include Girls' Volleyball (1998, 2007), Football (1993, 1994, 1996, 2009), Boys' Basketball (1989, 2008), Wrestling (1992, 1999, 2002), and numerous Girls' Track state titles.

== Performing arts ==
City High has been named a Signature School by the Grammy Foundation three times: 2000, 2001, and 2004. City High is one of only three schools nationwide to accomplish this. In 2004, Dr. Greg Grove (former choir director) and Bill Pringle (former band director) were flown to Washington D.C. for a congratulatory event by the Grammy Foundation.

City High also has a band program, most recently achieving a rank of I (Superior) in class 4A at the 2024 IHSMA State Marching Band festival. In the spring of 2024, City High's most prestigious band led by Mike Kowbel, the City High Wind Ensemble, won a spot to the 97th annual Iowa Bandmasters Association Conference, and traveled to Des Moines, Iowa, to attend and perform.

== Journalism ==
City High is home to three student publications, The Little Hawk (newspaper), The City Review (literary and art magazine) and Red and White (yearbook).

Both "The Little Hawk" and the "Red and White" are in the NSPA Hall of Fame.

The Little Hawk has earned National Pacemaker Awards (1989—95, 97–2000, 2012, 2014, 2015, 2016, and 2022) "The Red and White" has won one National Pacemaker Award (1996).

"The Little Hawk" has won the NSPA Best of Show in 1989–95, 97–99, 2012.

"The Little Hawk" and the "Red and White" were advised by Jack Kennedy from 1980 to 1999. Kennedy was named the Dow Jones Newspaper Fund Journalism Teacher of the Year in 1993 and inducted to the Iowa High School Press Association Hall of Fame in 1996.

"The Little Hawk" Newspaper was the first high school publication to create an app for smartphones. The app was developed by student Jonathan Myers.

== Notable alumni ==
- Thomas R. Cech, winner of the 1989 Nobel Prize in Chemistry
- A.J. Derby, professional football player.
- Tim Dwight, professional football player.
- Brian Ferentz, college football coach and former professional football player.
- James Ferentz, professional football player.
- Jay Hilgenberg, former professional football player (center) and broadcaster.
- Ashley Joens, basketball player
- Carol Kelso, former member of the Wisconsin State Assembly.
- Dan McCarney, former collegiate football coach. Former head coach at Iowa State University and University of North Texas.
- Jason Reeves, singer-songwriter
- Michael Roan, former professional football player
- Scott Swisher, former Iowa State Representative from January 1957-January 1959. House District 56, Johnson County, Iowa.
- Ramin Toloui, Assistant Secretary for the Bureau of Economic and Business Affairs and the United States Department of State. Former professor of the Practice at Stanford University and former Assistant Secretary of the Treasury for International Finance and Development at the United States Department of the Treasury
- Christopher C. Miller, former Acting United States Secretary of Defense
- Eddie Watt, former MLB player (Baltimore Orioles, Chicago Cubs, Philadelphia Phillies)
- Joey Woody, track and field coach and former athlete. As an athlete, specialized in the 400 meter hurdles.
- Harper Steele, Emmy Award winning writer (Saturday Night Live)

== See also ==
- List of high schools in Iowa
