= Joseph A. Greenwald =

American diplomat

Joseph Adolph Greenwald

12th Assistant Secretary of State for Economic and Business Affairs
- In office February 11, 1976 – September 10, 1976
- President: Gerald Ford
- Preceded by: Thomas O. Enders
- Succeeded by: Julius Katz

4th United States Ambassador to the European Union
- In office October 12, 1972 – January 28, 1976
- President: Richard Nixon; Gerald Ford
- Preceded by: J. Robert Schaetzel
- Succeeded by: Deane R. Hinton

4th United States Ambassador to the Organisation for Economic Co-operation and Development
- In office July 22, 1969 – October 12, 1972
- President: Richard Nixon
- Preceded by: Philip H. Trezise
- Succeeded by: William C. Turner

Personal details
- Born: September 18, 1918; Chicago, Illinois, U.S.
- Died: October 30, 2000 (aged 82); Washington, D.C., U.S.

Joseph Adolph Greenwald (September 18, 1918 – October 30, 2000) was an American diplomat who served as the United States Ambassador to the Organisation for Economic Co-operation and Development from 1969 to 1972, the United States Ambassador to the European Union from 1972 to 1976 and as the Assistant Secretary of State for Economic and Business Affairs in 1976.

He died of leukemia on October 30, 2000, in Washington, D.C. at age 82.

== See also ==
- List of ambassadors of the United States to the Organisation for Economic Co-operation and Development
