= Robert Hoff =

American football player and coach

Playing career
- 1948–1950: Iowa
- Position: End

Coaching career (HC unless noted)
- 1954: Iowa City HS (IA)
- 1961: Central Missouri
- 1962–1964: Coast Guard (assistant)

Head coaching record
- Overall: 3–5 (college)

Robert Hoff was an American football player and coach. He was a three-time letter letterwinner at the University of Iowa from 1948 to 1950, starring as an end. He served as the head football coach at Iowa City High School in Iowa City, Iowa (c. 1954) and at the University of Central Missouri (then Warrensburg Teachers College) for one season in 1961. He also served as an assistant varsity line coach at the United States Coast Guard Academy under head coach Otto Graham.

== Head coaching record ==
=== College ===
Year	Team	Overall	Conference	Standing	Bowl/playoffs
Central Missouri State Mules (Missouri Intercollegiate Athletic Association) (1962)
1961	Central Missouri State	3–5	2–3	T–4th	
Graceland:		3–5	2–3		
Total:		10–19–2			
