= Manisha Singh =

American attorney & government official (born 1971)

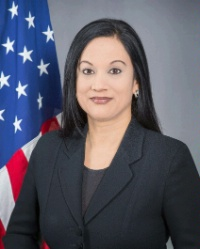

25th Assistant Secretary of State for Economic and Business Affairs
- In office November 22, 2017 – January 20, 2021
- President: Donald Trump
- Preceded by: Charles Rivkin
- Succeeded by: Ramin Toloui

Acting Under Secretary for Economic Growth, Energy, and the Environment
- In office September 28, 2018 – June 20, 2019
- President: Donald Trump
- Preceded by: Catherine A. Novelli
- Succeeded by: Keith J. Krach

Personal details
- Born: 1971 (age 54–55) Pantnagar, India
- Party: Republican
- Education: University of Miami (BA); University of Florida (JD); American University (LLM)

Manisha Singh (born 1971) is an American attorney and government official who served as assistant secretary of state for economic and business affairs in the Trump administration until January 20, 2021. She previously also served as acting under secretary of state for economic growth, energy, and the environment. In April 2020, President Donald Trump announced his intent to nominate Singh to be the next United States representative to the Organization for Economic Cooperation and Development, with the rank of ambassador. On January 3, 2021, her nomination was returned to the President under Rule XXXI, Paragraph 6 of the United States Senate.

== Early life and education ==
Singh was born in Pantnagar, India, and raised in Lake Alfred, Florida, where her father was a professor at the University of Florida. She has one sister. While attending Auburndale High School, Singh met Congressman Andy Ireland during a school trip. Singh earned a Bachelor of Arts degree in political science from the University of Miami. She then earned a Juris Doctor from the Fredric G. Levin College of Law at the University of Florida and Master of Laws in International Legal Studies from the Washington College of Law at American University.

== Career ==
In the private sector, she worked as a lawyer at Reed Smith and Squire Patton Boggs. Singh served as the Deputy Assistant Secretary in the Bureau of Economic, Energy and Business Affairs during the Bush administration. In addition, she was an executive director at J.P. Morgan Chase & Co. in the International Government Relations group. Manisha Singh was designated Acting Under Secretary of State for Economic Growth, Energy, and the Environment Shield Ombudsperson by the President in September 2018 until Keith J. Krach was confirmed as Under Secretary of State. She also serves as the Foreign Affairs Sous Sherpa for the 45th G7 summit.

Unanimously confirmed by the Senate and sworn in as assistant secretary of State in November 2017, she led a team of over 200 employees in the Bureau of Economic and Business Affairs. She was the first woman appointed to the role and was responsible for advancing American prosperity, entrepreneurship and innovation worldwide.

She was the senior fellow for international economic affairs at the American Foreign Policy Council as well as a term member at the Council on Foreign Relations.

=== Assistant secretary of state ===
In September 2018, during a congressional hearing and in her role as assistant secretary of state, Singh reminded Congress, that if Russia did not achieve compliance with international chemical weapons laws by the November deadline, the government would not hesitate to implement the extreme sanctions announced in August.
