= Thomas O. Enders =

American diplomat (1931–1996)

Thomas Ostrom Enders
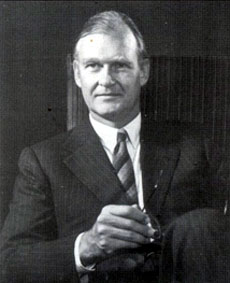

United States Ambassador to Canada
- In office February 17, 1976 – December 14, 1979
- President: Gerald Ford
- Preceded by: William J. Porter
- Succeeded by: Kenneth M. Curtis

United States Ambassador to the European Communities
- In office November 6, 1979 – May 27, 1981
- President: Jimmy Carter
- Preceded by: Deane R. Hinton
- Succeeded by: George S. Vest

21st Assistant Secretary of State for Inter-American Affairs
- In office June 23, 1981 – June 27, 1983
- Preceded by: William G. Bowdler
- Succeeded by: Langhorne A. Motley

57th United States Ambassador to Spain
- In office September 15, 1983 – July 6, 1986
- President: Ronald Reagan
- Preceded by: Terence Todman
- Succeeded by: Reginald Bartholomew

11th Assistant Secretary of State for Economic and Business Affairs
- In office 1974–1975
- Preceded by: Willis Coburn Armstrong
- Succeeded by: Joseph A. Greenwald

Personal details
- Born: November 28, 1931 Hartford, Connecticut, U.S.
- Died: March 17, 1996 (aged 64) New York City, New York, U.S.
- Resting place: Waterford, Connecticut, U.S.
- Education: Yale University; University of Paris
- Alma mater: Harvard University

Thomas Ostrom Enders (November 28, 1931 – March 17, 1996) was an American diplomat. His father, Ostrom Enders, was president of Hartford National Bank, and his uncle, John Franklin Enders, was the 1954 Nobel Laureate in Physiology or Medicine.

In 1976, US President Gerald Ford nominated Enders as the United States Ambassador to Canada. Enders held this post from February 17, 1976, to December 14, 1979. Between 1979 and 1981, he was the United States Ambassador to the European Communities. President Ronald Reagan nominated Enders as Assistant Secretary of State for Inter-American Affairs. Enders held office from June 23, 1981, to June 27, 1983.

Reagan then named Enders to be the US Ambassador to Spain, with Enders presenting his credentials to the Spanish government on September 15, 1983, and representing the U.S. in Spain until July 6, 1986. Enders retired in 1986. He died in New York City on March 17, 1996. He is buried in Waterford, Connecticut.

== Background and early life ==
Enders was born on November 28, 1931, in Hartford, Connecticut. Enders was a member of the class of 1949 of Phillips Exeter Academy. He then was educated at Yale University, where he was a member of the Scroll and Key society, receiving a B.A. in 1953. He received the Alpheus Henry Snow Prize awarded to the senior "who through the combination of intellectual achievement, character, and personality, shall be adjudged by the faculty to have done most for Yale by inspiring classmates with an admiration for scholarship" and the Warren Memorial High Scholarship Prize for the "highest academic rank for four years among B.A. candidates." He attended the University of Paris, receiving a M.A. in 1955 and Harvard University, receiving a M.A. in 1957.

== Diplomatic career ==
In 1958, Enders joined the United States Foreign Service as an intelligence research specialist. From 1960 to 1963, he was a visa officer and then an economic officer in Stockholm. From 1963, he was supervisory international economist at the Bureau of European Affairs. In 1966, he was a special assistant in the Office of the Under Secretary of State for Political Affairs. In 1968, he became Deputy Assistant Secretary of State for International Monetary Affairs. From 1969, he was deputy chief of mission in Belgrade. From 1971 to 1973, he held the same position in Phnom Penh. On 27 September 1972 a booby-trap exploded in the car he was using. He escaped injury, but two others were killed. In 1974, Enders became Assistant Under Secretary of State for Economic and Business Affairs.

=== Assistant Under Secretary of State for Economic and Business Affairs, 1973–1976 ===
Henry Kissinger appointed Enders to the role of Assistant Secretary of State for Economic and Business Affairs in 1973. Ender's job was to corral the allies into a common approach to the energy crisis and prevent bilateralism from gaining the upper hand. The US spearheaded the International Energy Program (IEP) Agreement, underpinned by the International Energy Agency (IEA), which still exists today as a counterweight to OPEC. To make the US appear more credible on the IEA, the 94th US Congress enacted the Energy Policy and Conservation Act in 1975. It aimed to promote conservation, renewable and alternative energy resources.

Canada was a key piece of the energy supply puzzle, lying in between the lower 48 states and the Alaskan North Slope. The US Government had chosen the Trans-Alaskan Pipeline System (TAPS) over the more efficient Trans-Canadian route, to avoid relying on Canada for such a vital resource. TAPS routed the oil pipeline from Prudhoe Bay to the Port of Valdez, then requiring transport via tanker to west coast ports. The Haida Nation, whose homeland is the Haida Gwaii Archipelago, protested that the passage of massively laden oil tankers would create risks. In the interest of preserving the lands of the Haida, Enders imposed a 100-mile tanker exclusion zone from Cape St John, at least for a period of time.

Enders was also an enthusiastic supporter of Canada's development of its own energy resources. Enders felt that it made more sense to use the Alberta tar sands, for example, to serve proximate markets in the lower 48 than distant markets in Central and Eastern Canada. This preference for North-South trade where manifestly more efficient became a common theme of his approach on coal and electricity, dovetailing with the economic interests of provincial premiers.

=== U.S. Ambassador to Canada, 1976–1979 ===
As ambassador to Canada, Enders set the stage for the historic CUSFTA.

Introducing himself in an interview with Bruce Philips on CTV on 11 April 1976, Enders said: "We think that the Canadian American relationship is one that has a lot of opportunities as well as clearly some differences that have to be solved. I think that an activist approach to this is the word I would use about the kinds of missions that I've been given and the kind of person I expect to be here. This is necessary to ensure that we exploit those opportunities as well as try and resolve those differences so that the differences don't come to dominate the relationship."

Enders decided on an extensive outreach effort of speeches focused on his 'missions': defense, energy, the environment and trade liberalization. This was a dramatic change from the historical tradition of US envoys engaging in fatuous talk about best friends, closest neighbors and undefended border". He was at times attacked for unwarranted intrusion in Canadian affairs.

Intensive socializing was also part of the program. Enders and Gaetana both spoke fluent French: essential in Canada in 1976 on the eve of the victory of the Parti Quebecois. Gaetana and Enders travelled together covering extensive regions of the country. Enders stated that he travelled 50,000 miles annually across Canada.

Early on in his posting, Enders addressed in a speech at the Conference Board of Canada in November 1976, the "continentalism that haunts every discussion of improving Canadian-US relations". This periodic Canadian paranoia of being absorbed by the US de facto, he thought, was a natural consequence of the US being Canada's top trading partner. He responded by noting that the US had now also recognized Canada as its top trading partner, setting the stage for a partnership of equals. Enders anticipated that mutual dependence would grow under ambitious tariff liberalization.

"Canada-US relations will not work well", Enders said, "if we feel we are prisoners of that interdependence, not its masters." He urged a new common practice: that every difficulty and dispute be met with consultation, inquiry, process towards a joint understanding. He urged "expansionary" solutions be found to permit a higher balance of advantage, rather than taking something away from one country for the benefit of the other.

Then Under Secretary of External Affairs Allan Gotlieb, subsequently Ambassador to the US in the 1980s, said about Enders:

"Over many years, Canada and the US typically emphasized the importance of resolving issues, or trying to, behind closed doors. Tom [Enders] was, I believe, the first US Ambassador to Canada to speak so often and openly about our differences and the reasons for them. This sometimes gave rise to controversy, but he believed that a key part of his assignment was to contribute to a better public understanding of the relationship and issues between us. This sometimes got him into hot water with the Canadian government and senior officials, but he rightly saw this as a key part of his job. As a part of his practice of public diplomacy, he and Gaetana made the Ambassadorial residence a place of great excitement and for continuing debate and dialogue. The official residence became highly prized as a place to mix and mingle and debate. There was no more exciting place to be in Ottawa and probably Canada."

Strengthening management of shared environments, as had been achieved since 1972 by the International Joint Commission for the Great Lakes, was a recurring aspiration for Enders. At the time, the irritants were the Garrison Diversion project on the US side and the Saskatchewan Government's plan to build a thermal generating plant on the Poplar River near the border with Montana. In several speeches on environmental frictions, his message was "we must develop better ways of dealing with them to our mutual benefit and not to trade them off."

Before arriving in Canada, Enders had experience in trade negotiations. He was closely involved in the Kennedy Round of trade negotiations in 1966 and 1967 as Special Assistant to Under Secretary for Political Affairs Walt Rostow. Reporting to Secretary of State Dean Rusk, Enders stated a "a very significant – in some ways brilliant – deal with Canada" had been reached "involving substantial cuts on $1.3–$1.4 billion on trade in each side". The Kennedy Round was the first of the multilateral trade negotiations to build multilateral tariff cuts on the basis of a series of bilateral tariff deals that were then multilateralized to all GATT parties.

By 1977, Enders was "running around talking about free trade" in Canada. In a key speech to the Conference Board of Canada, Enders said: "You're going to ask right off what two job-short economies can do for each other in the field of trade without making their problems worse. The answer is, of course, that you can get important net job creation – and a major assist in combatting inflation – by reciprocal reduction of trade barriers…"

On October 20, 1977, freer trade with the US became official Canadian policy and the third option was formally binned. Finance Minister Jean Chrétien's Economic and Fiscal Statement to the House of Commons indicated: "We need lower – not higher – trade barriers here and around the world if we are to build efficient manufacturing industries and increase our productivity."

Both Canada and the US were firmly focused on concluding the Tokyo Round of multilateral trade negotiations (MTN) held by the GATT. The Tokyo Round was not going well, mainly because Japan and the European Economic Community were reluctant to cut tariffs in a period of economic recession. The US instead believed that multilateral trade liberalisation was urgently required to restart economic growth in all its major trading partners in the wake of the energy crisis.

Enders publicized a US tariff offer to reduce (but not eliminate) nuisance tariffs on processed raw materials which hindered Canadian exports to the US. Enders thought an ambitious bilateral tariff cutting agreement with Canada might galvanise Japan and the European Economic Community to do the same. He also saw the multilateral route as being the only one for Canada and the US to advance in their common objective of removing trade barriers to the export of agricultural products, including distortive aid for grain exports to emerging markets.

If the MTN route seemed superior to Enders, he was also keenly aware that a trade agreement might not "yield enough economic benefit to offset its political costs" and a North American energy market, would "arouse American expectations that cannot be met and stir up Canadian fears that are difficult to put to rest". (CUSFTA and NAFTA are not common markets.)

=== Assistant Secretary of State for Inter-American Affairs, 1981–1983 ===
In 1982 before a Senate committee on the El Mozote massacre in El Salvador, in which the Salvadoran Army killed more than 800 civilians during the Salvadoran Civil War, Enders attacked New York Times correspondent Raymond Bonner and Washington Post correspondent Alma Guillermoprieto, who had reported on the massacre. Enders stated that there had been a battle between guerrillas and the army but that "no evidence could be found to confirm that government forces systematically massacred civilians." Enders also repeated the claim that only 300 people had lived in Mozote, and it was impossible for the death toll to have reached that reported in the Times and Post stories.

=== U.S. Ambassador to Spain, 1983–1986 ===
Enders was appointed Ambassador to Spain in August 1983, having been forced out of his previous position by what Secretary of State George P. Shultz described as "hard liners", led by NSC direction William "Judge" Clark and including William Casey, Ed Meese and others. Shultz described Enders as a "loyal, keenly analytic officer with a style that could irritate even those who supported him; he might be difficult, but he was a definite asset." Shultz hoped that getting Enders away from the Central American crisis would make it easier for him to deal with the hard liners, as well as reduce the heat on Enders. That proved not to be the case. Before leaving for Spain Enders chose Jack R. Binns, the former Ambassador to Honduras with whom he had clashed (see above), as his deputy in Madrid.

The principal issues concerning Enders in Spain were ensuring its continued membership in NATO, its entry into the then European Community (now EU) and the renewal of the U.S. mutual defense treaty with Spain, which provided strategically important air and naval basis for U.S. forces that would have expired in 1987. Enders quickly established excellent working relations with Socialist Party (PSOE) Prime Minister Felipe Gonzalez and King Juan Carlos, both of whom supported continued membership in NATO and the EU initiative. NATO, however, was a serious problem. The PSOE officially opposed Spanish membership, as did a substantial majority of the Spanish public. To overcome this, Gonzalez would propose a national referendum, the outcome of which was in doubt.

Several months earlier Shultz had advised Enders that the President had expressed concerns about his support of U. S. foreign policy, and Shultz sought to allay his concerns. This time, however, the source was not the hard liners, but Mrs. Reagan. As a result, Enders made at least two trips to Washington for White House meetings. But they had not put the matter to rest. During the President's stay in Madrid, Enders met privately with him and left believing that the matter had been resolved.

Substantively the visit cleared the air on several bi-lateral issues, including Spain's insistence that as part of the price for Spain remaining in NATO would be giving up the U.S. Air Force's Madrid Air Force Base, although the operational units could be moved elsewhere in the country.

The question of Enders' loyalty resurfaced a few months later and was a continuing distraction to Shultz. He finally advised Enders that while he had full faith in his service, it seemed inevitable that he would have to leave, offering another appointment, perhaps Australia. In late 1985 the NSC staff contacted the embassy to report that Mrs. Reagan's office had request that McFarland agree to see the Countess of Romanones and inquired as to her background. Based on the embassy's information, McFarland declined the honor. A second, more pointed request caused him to agree to see her. Her purpose, it turned out, was to ask McFarland to put her name forward as a replacement for Enders.

These events triggered an inquiry which revealed that for the past several years the countess had been paying a columnist at ABC, the leading Madrid right-wing newspaper, to write articles highlighting Enders' good relations with the Gonzalez government and implying that he did not support the administration's foreign policy. These articles were clipped and, with translations, forwarded to friends of the countess in New York who then passed them to Mrs. Reagan's office. While the Countess was never considered for the post to which she aspired, her efforts contributed greatly to his replacement in July 1986.

During Enders' final months the NATO referendum produced a solid majority in favor of continued NATO membership, a great victory for Gonzalez, and preliminary talks on the renewal of the U.S. bases agreement. It was finally approved in December 1988 and included the closure of USAF involvement in the Madrid Air Force Base (Torrejón Air Base).

== Enders Endowment ==
The Enders Endowment funds a graduate fellowship program as well as hosts a lecture series annually in Washington, D.C., for US–Canadian relations. The Thomas and Gaetana Enders Fellowship has sought, in the past 15 years, to contribute to their legacy. It is a partnership with ACSUS and SAIS to advance academic research and fund travel of graduate students to Canada.

== Notes ==
Diplomatic posts
Preceded by William J. Porter	United States Ambassador to Canada; February 17, 1976 – December 14, 1979	Succeeded by Kenneth M. Curtis
Preceded by Deane R. Hinton	United States Ambassador to the European Communities; 1979–1981	Succeeded by George S. Vest
Preceded by Terence Todman	United States Ambassador to Spain; September 15, 1983 – July 6, 1986	Succeeded by Reginald Bartholomew
Government offices
Preceded by William G. Bowdler	Assistant Secretary of State for Inter-American Affairs; June 23, 1981 – June 27, 1983	Succeeded by Langhorne A. Motley
