= List of ambassadors of the United States to the European Union =

Ambassador of the United States to the European Union
- Seal of the United States Department of State

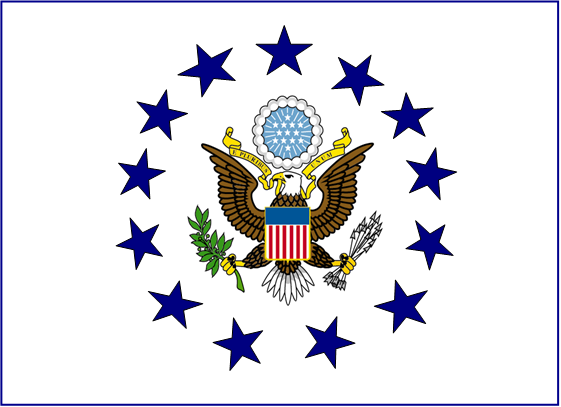
- Flag of a United States chief of mission

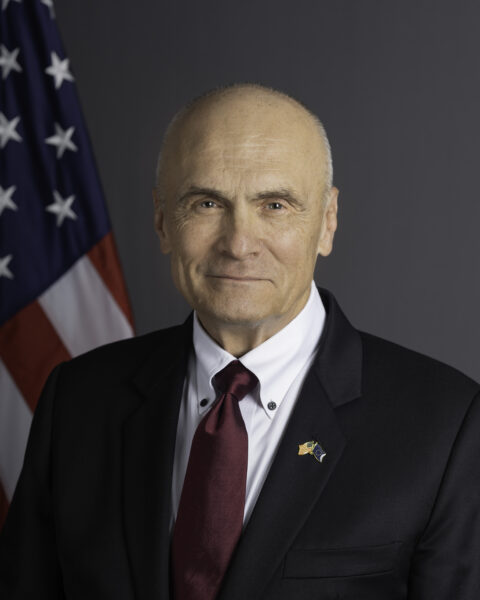
- Incumbent; Andrew Puzder since September 11, 2025
- Nominator: The president
- Inaugural holder: William Walton Butterworth as Ambassador Extraordinary and Plenipotentiary
- Formation: 1961
- Website: U.S. Mission - European Union

This is a list of United States ambassadors to the European Union. The formal title of this position is Representative of the United States of America to the European Union (prior to May 9, 1994: European Communities), with the rank and status of Ambassador Extraordinary and Plenipotentiary.

== Ambassadors to the European Union ==
Image	Name	Home state	Appointment	Presentation	Termination	Notes
	William Walton Butterworth	Louisiana	August 10, 1961		October 25, 1962	^{A}
	John W. Tuthill	Illinois	October 23, 1962		June 7, 1966	
	J. Robert Schaetzel	Illinois	September 16, 1966		October 25, 1972	
	Joseph A. Greenwald	Illinois	October 12, 1972		January 28, 1976	
	Deane R. Hinton	Illinois	January 29, 1976		December 3, 1979	
	Thomas O. Enders	Connecticut	November 6, 1979		May 27, 1981	
	George Southall Vest	Maryland	September 20, 1981		February 27, 1985	
	J. William Middendorf	Connecticut	July 12, 1985		February 1, 1987	
	Alfred H. Kingon	New York	March 27, 1987		June 23, 1989	
	Thomas Niles	Washington, D.C.	June 23, 1989		August 26, 1991	
	James Dobbins	New York	October 9, 1991		July 31, 1993	
	Stuart E. Eizenstat	Washington, D.C.	August 2, 1993		April 1996	^{B}
	A. Vernon Weaver	Arkansas	July 2, 1996	July 16, 1996	February 28, 1999	
	Richard Morningstar	Washington, D.C.	July 7, 1999		September 21, 2001	
	Rockwell A. Schnabel	California	October 1, 2001	October 9, 2001	June 18, 2005	
	Michael McKinley (Acting)	Washington D.C.	June 18, 2005		January 20, 2006	
	C. Boyden Gray	North Carolina	January 17, 2006	January 20, 2006	December 31, 2007	
	Kristen Silverberg	Texas	May 2, 2008	July 22, 2008	January 18, 2009	
	William Kennard	Washington, D.C.	November 23, 2009	December 2009	July 29, 2013	
	Anthony L. Gardner	New York	February 13, 2014	March 18, 2014	January 20, 2017	
	Gordon Sondland	Washington	June 28, 2018	July 9, 2018	February 7, 2020	
	Ronald Gidwitz (Acting)	Illinois	May 4, 2020		January 20, 2021	
	Mark W. Libby (Acting)	Washington D.C.	January 20, 2021		January 24, 2022	
	Mark Gitenstein	Alabama	December 18, 2021	January 24, 2022	January 17, 2025	
	Norman Thatcher Scharpf (Acting)	Washington D.C.	January 17, 2025		September 11, 2025	
	Andrew Puzder	Tennessee	September 11, 2025		Incumbent	

== See also ==
- United States Mission to the European Union

== Notes ==
Previously representative (beginning in 1959) to several of the pre-EU (European Communities) groups including the European Coal and Steel Community, European Economic Community, and European Atomic Energy Community. First ambassador.
Title changed from "European Communities" to "European Union" on May 9, 1994.
