= Geoffrey Okamoto =

American economist and government official (born 1985)

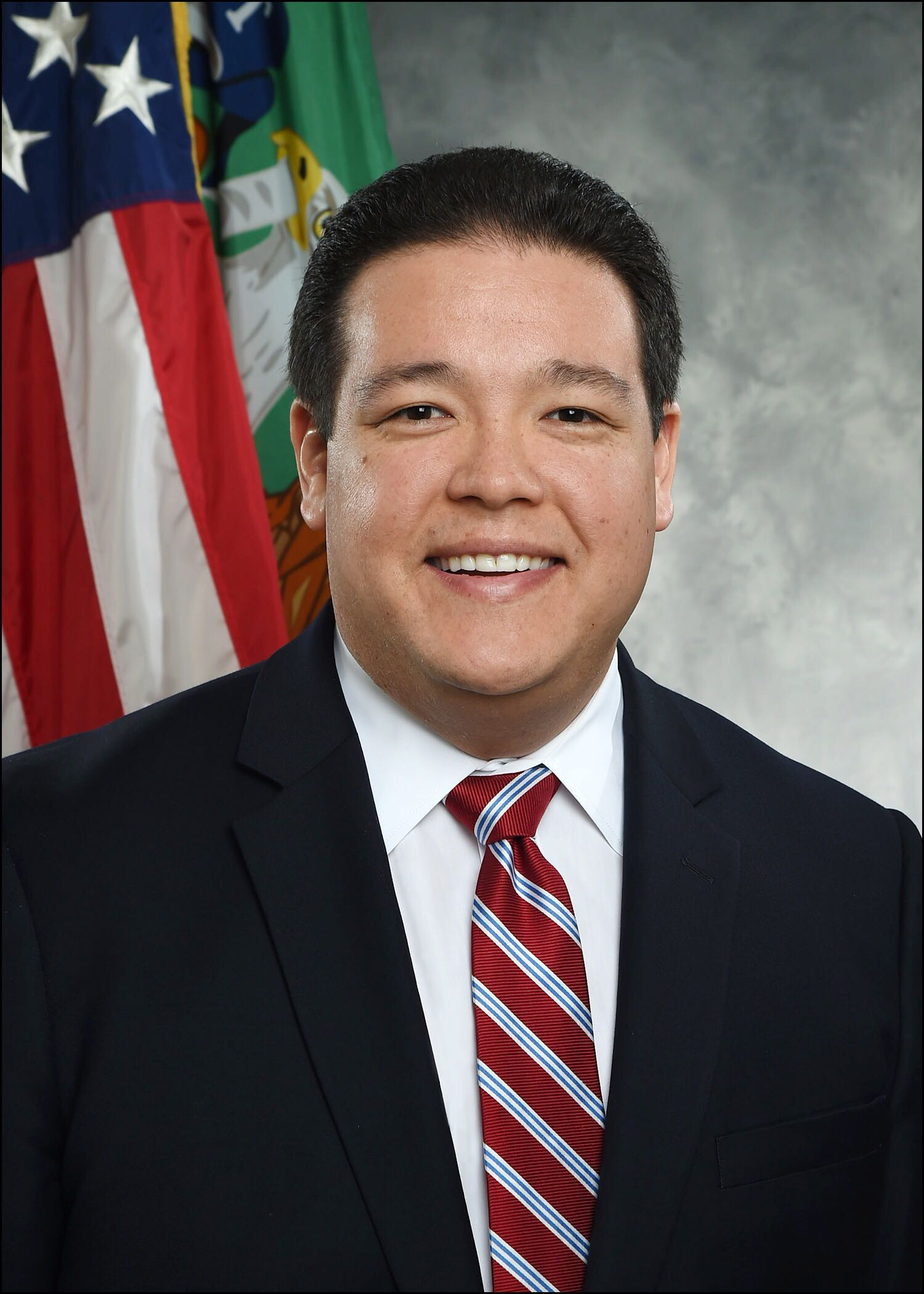
- Official portrait, 2017

First Deputy Managing Director of the International Monetary Fund
- In office March 19, 2020 – January 21, 2022
- President: Kristalina Georgieva
- Preceded by: David Lipton
- Succeeded by: Gita Gopinath

Assistant Secretary of the Treasury for International Finance and Development
- Acting
- In office July 2018 – March 19, 2020
- President: Donald Trump
- Preceded by: Ramin Toloui
- Succeeded by: Brent Neiman

Personal details
- Born: Geoffrey William Seiji Okamoto; January 18, 1985 (age 41) Torrance, California, U.S.
- Party: Republican
- Education: California State Polytechnic University, Pomona (BS); Georgetown University (MPP)

Geoffrey William Seiji Okamoto (born January 18, 1985) is an American economist and government official who served as first deputy managing director of the International Monetary Fund. Okamoto previously served as the acting assistant secretary for international finance and development in the United States Department of the Treasury. He was nominated for this position on January 1, 2019, by the White House and was never confirmed by the United States Congress. He previously served as acting assistant secretary for international markets and investment, for which he was also not confirmed.

Okamoto left the global lender in early 2022, and was replaced by Gita Gopinath.

== Early life and education ==
Okamoto was born in Torrance, California, and raised in Irvine, California, where he attended Woodbridge High School. While in high school, he earned the rank of Eagle Scout.

He attended the California State Polytechnic University, Pomona and earned a Bachelor of Science in computer information systems in 2008. He earned a Master of Public Policy from the McCourt School of Public Policy in 2011. Okamoto completed his graduate research on the effect bank reserve requirements have historically had on the pricing and availability of bank loans. While in graduate school, he studied at Corpus Christi College, Oxford.

In 2019, Georgetown University awarded Okamoto the 1820 Graduate Award for "outstanding leadership and service to the university."

== Career ==
=== Consulting ===
Okamoto began his career as a consultant for KPMG in 2008. He worked with clients in the financial services, asset management, technology, and healthcare sectors on matters related to regulatory compliance, risk management, and operational efficiency.

=== Congressional aide ===
While completing graduate studies at Georgetown University, Okamoto was hired by John Campbell in 2011 to serve as his advisor on financial services and other economic-related matters. In 2013, he was appointed policy director for monetary policy and trade for the House Financial Services Committee.

While policy director, he worked to force conditions on additional funds the Obama administration sought for the International Monetary Fund. This included a restoration of key rules governing very large loans which had been removed to allow IMF lending to Greece. Ultimately, the IMF amended its rules and Congress allowed the funding provision to pass.

In 2014, he was hired by Pat Toomey to serve as his chief advisor for the Senate Banking Committee. When Republicans regained the majority in the Senate in 2016, Okamoto became the majority staff director for the Senate Banking Subcommittee on Financial Institutions.

=== U.S. Department of the Treasury ===
In November 2016, Okamoto was recruited onto the transition team for Donald Trump working on the Treasury Department's landing team, focussing on international economics and domestic finance. In 2017, the President appointed him deputy assistant secretary of the Treasury within the Office of International Affairs, with responsibilities over international financial institutions and sovereign debt matters. He launched the Women Entrepreneurs Finance Initiative, a key priority Ivanka Trump, and currently serves as chairman of its Governing Committee.

Upon the administration withdrawing its initial nominee for assistant secretary, Okamoto was elevated to serve, on an acting basis, as assistant secretary for international finance and development. Okamoto was responsible for several divisions with responsibilities for regional and bilateral economic engagement, international economic coordination through the G7 and G20, international monetary affairs, and executing U.S. participation in international financial institutions. He was never confirmed by the United States Congress.

Okamoto represented the United States on the board of the World Bank's Global Environment Facility. He has been active in assisting governments with economic reform, including Argentina, Haiti, Jordan, Latvia, Somalia, and Ukraine.

Okamoto also held concurrent appointments by President Trump to be Acting Governor of the European Bank for Reconstruction and Development, the African Development Bank, and the African Development Fund.

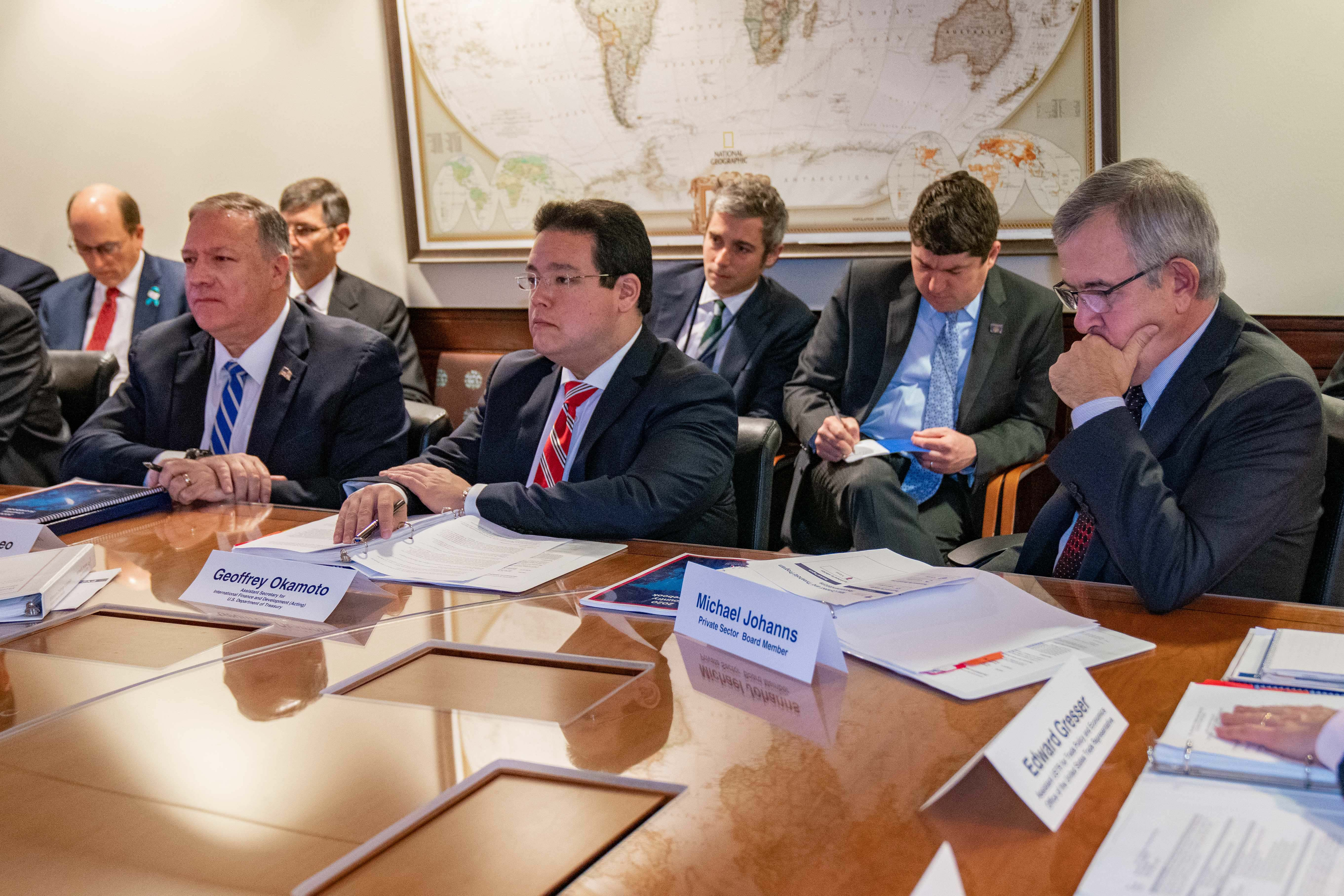
Okamoto (center), in his capacity as acting Assistant Secretary for International Finance and Development, at a board meeting of the Millennium Challenge Corporation in 2019

=== IMF ===
IMF Managing Director Kristalina Georgieva nominated Okamoto to serve as her Deputy on March 12, 2020. Ms. Georgieva came to know Mr. Okamoto during his time at Treasury through his engagement with the IMF and World Bank. In her endorsement, Ms. Georgieva cited Okamoto's role to help bolster and preserve the IMF's lending envelope during the previous two IMF resource reviews.

At the IMF, Okamoto has called for debt relief for poorer countries suffering the economic harm resulting from the COVID-19 pandemic.

On April 12, 2021, Okamoto set a goal of distributing a $650 billion allocation of Special Drawing Rights monetary reserves to member countries by the summer of 2021.

== External references ==
- TheOka(DOT)Net
