= Luis Guinot =

American diplomat (1935–2022)

Luis Guinot, Jr.

United States Ambassador to Costa Rica
- In office 27 August 1991 – 1 March 1993
- President: George H. W. Bush
- Preceded by: Deane Roesch Hinton
- Succeeded by: Robert O. Homme; Chargé d'Affaires ad interim

Personal details
- Born: April 8, 1935 San Juan, Puerto Rico
- Died: March 19, 2022 (aged 86) Canton, Georgia
- Spouse: Marta Guinot
- Children: Tina Guinot ( Barnes) Patricia Guinot (Berube) victoria Guinot ( Nielson) and Claudia Guinot ( Boonenberg)
- Education: B.A., New York University; J.D., Columbus School of Law
- Profession: Attorney
- Website: http://www.shapirosher.com/

Military service
- Branch/service: United States Navy
- Years of service: 1959-1967
- Rank: Lieutenant

Luis Guinot Jr. (April 8, 1935 – March 19, 2022) was an American diplomat who was the U.S. ambassador to Costa Rica from 1991 to 1993.

Nominated by President George H. W. Bush on May 30, 1991, Guinot was confirmed by the United States Senate in the summer of 1991 and soon afterwards relocated permanently to San José where he presented his credentials to then Costa Rican President Rafael Ángel Calderón Fournier on August 27, 1991. He left the post on March 1, 1993.

Prior to his nomination, Guinot was commissioned in the United States Navy in 1959 and served for 8 years including service in the United States Navy Reserve. He was a partner and attorney with the law firm of Kelley Drye & Warren in Washington, DC. From 1974 to 1985, Guinot served as a partner and attorney with the law firm of Rose, Schmidt, Chapman, Duff and Hasley. From (1972 to 1974), Mr. Guinot served as Assistant General Counsel for the Department of Agriculture. In addition, Mr. Guinot was a self-employed attorney at law and consultant and served as Administrator for the Office of the Commonwealth of Puerto Rico in Washington, DC from 1969 to 1972. He also served as an associate attorney with the law firm of Faerber and Cerny (1968–1969)

In private practice he has represented the Commonwealth of Puerto Rico, as well as private Puerto Rican clients and political organizations. Guinot has authored numerous articles and appeared as a speaker on US-Latin American relations and international free trade agreements. He has also appeared at symposia and on numerous panels focused on Puerto Rico's commonwealth relationship with the United States.

In 2003, he was selected by the Hispanic Association on Corporate Responsibility as one of eight Fortune Board Honorees, a distinction granted to outstanding Hispanic leaders serving on the boards of large corporations. Guinot is a member of the board of directors of Tampa Electric Co. and its parent company, TECO Energy.

Guinot held a Bachelor of Arts degree from New York University (Class of 1957) and a juris doctor from Columbus School of Law at The Catholic University of America (Class of 1968). Fluent in both Spanish and English, he was married and the father of five children. He was latterly a partner with the Washington D.C. law firm of Shapiro, Sher, Guinot & Sandler.

Guinot died on March 19, 2022, at the age of 86. He was buried at Arlington National Cemetery.

== See also ==
- List of Puerto Ricans
- French immigration to Puerto Rico

Diplomatic posts
Preceded by Deane Roesch Hinton	United States Ambassador to Costa Rica; 27 August 1991–1 March 1993	Succeeded by Robert O. Homme; Chargé d'Affaires ad interim
