= Robert F. Woodward =

American diplomat (1908–2001)

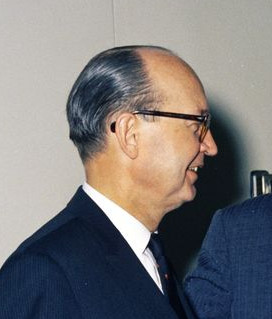
- Woodward in 1961

8th Assistant Secretary of State for Inter-American Affairs
- In office July 17, 1961 – March 17, 1962
- Preceded by: Thomas C. Mann
- Succeeded by: Edwin M. Martin

50th United States Ambassador to Spain
- In office May 10, 1962 – February 1, 1965
- Preceded by: Anthony J. Drexel Biddle, Jr.
- Succeeded by: Angier Biddle Duke

Personal details
- Born: October 1, 1908 Minneapolis, Minnesota, US
- Died: May 18, 2001 (aged 92) Washington, D.C., US
- Education: University of Minnesota (BA)

Robert Forbes Woodward (October 1, 1908 – May 18, 2001) was an American diplomat who focused on U.S. relations with Latin America. He served as United States Ambassador to Costa Rica from 1954 to 1958, Ambassador to Uruguay from 1958 to 1961, and Ambassador to Chile in 1961.

== Biography ==
Woodward was born in Minneapolis on October 1, 1908. He was educated at the University of Minnesota, receiving a B.A. in 1930.

Woodward joined the United States Foreign Service in 1931. As a Foreign Service Officer, he served in Winnipeg 1932–33; in Buenos Aires 1933–1936; in Bogotá 1936–37; and in Rio de Janeiro 1937–1939. He then returned to work for the United States Department of State in Washington, D.C., serving as Assistant Chief of the Division of American Republics 1941–42. He then returned to the field, serving in La Paz 1943-44; in Guatemala 1944–45; and in Havana 1945–1947. From 1947 to 1949, he was back in Washington, D.C., as Deputy Director of the Office of American Republic Affairs. In 1950, he returned to the field with a posting in Stockholm, where he served until 1952. He then returned to Washington to serve as Chief of the Division of Foreign Service Personnel 1952–53 and as Deputy Assistant Secretary of State for Inter-American Affairs 1953–54.

In 1954, President of the United States Dwight D. Eisenhower nominated Woodward as United States Ambassador to Costa Rica. Woodward presented his credentials on December 3, 1954, and served in this post until March 15, 1958. Eisenhower then appointed him as United States Ambassador to Uruguay and he held this post from April 21, 1958, through March 29, 1961. (On a sidenote, Ambassador Woodward was a longtime advocate in favor of creation of the Inter-American Development Bank, which was created in 1960.) President John F. Kennedy then named him United States Ambassador to Chile, though he held this post for only two months, from May 5, 1961, to July 6, 1961.

In the wake of the failed Bay of Pigs Invasion in April 1961, Kennedy nominated Woodward as Assistant Secretary of State for Inter-American Affairs and Woodward held this office from July 17, 1961, through March 17, 1962. As Assistant Secretary led a successful effort to have Cuba suspended from membership in the Organization of American States. He was also the architect of the first meeting of the Alliance for Progress, a centerpiece of the Kennedy Administration's Latin America policy post-Bay of Pigs.

Kennedy next named Woodward United States Ambassador to Spain, with Woodward serving from May 10, 1962, through February 1, 1965.

Woodward retired in 1965. He died of heart failure at his home in Washington, D.C., on May 18, 2001, at the age of 92.

Diplomatic posts
Preceded by Robert C. Hill	United States Ambassador to Costa Rica; December 3, 1954 – March 15, 1958	Succeeded by Whiting Willauer
Preceded by Jefferson Patterson	United States Ambassador to Uruguay; April 21, 1958 – March 29, 1961	Succeeded by Edward J. Sparks
Preceded by Walter Howe	United States Ambassador to Chile; May 5, 1961 – July 6, 1961	Succeeded by Charles W. Cole
Government offices
Preceded by Thomas C. Mann	Assistant Secretary of State for Inter-American Affairs; July 17, 1961 – March 17, 1962	Succeeded by Edwin M. Martin
Diplomatic posts
Preceded by Anthony Joseph Drexel Biddle Jr.	United States Ambassador to Spain; May 10, 1962 – February 1, 1965	Succeeded by Angier Biddle Duke
