= J. Robert Schaetzel =

American diplomat

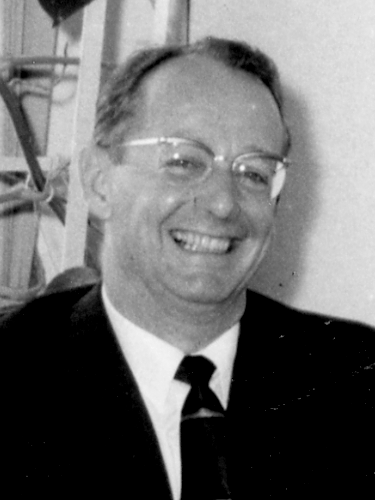

3rd United States Ambassador to the European Union
- In office September 16, 1966 – October 25, 1972
- President: Lyndon B. Johnson; Richard Nixon
- Preceded by: John W. Tuthill
- Succeeded by: Joseph A. Greenwald

Personal details
- Born: John Robert Schaetzel; January 28, 1917 Holtville, California, U.S.
- Died: November 7, 2003 (aged 86) Bethesda, Maryland, U.S.

J. Robert Schaetzel (January 28, 1917 – November 7, 2003) was an American diplomat who served as the United States Ambassador to the European Union from 1966 to 1972. He served in various government positions from 1942 till his retirement in 1972. The United States Department of State records his official position as Representative of the United States to the European Union, with the rank and status of Ambassador Extraordinary and Plenipotentiary, from 1966 to 1972."Representatives of the U.S.A. to the European Union, with the rank and status of Ambassador Extraordinary and Plenipotentiary". United States Department of State.

He died of pneumonia on November 7, 2003, in Bethesda, Maryland at age 86.
