= Thomas C. Mann =

American lawyer and diplomat (1912–1999)

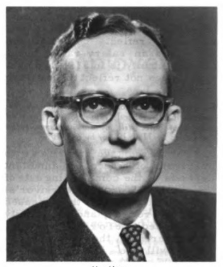
- Born: Thomas Clifton Mann; November 11, 1912; Laredo, Texas, US
- Died: January 23, 1999 (aged 86); Austin, Texas
- Resting place: Laredo City Cemetery
- Education: Baylor University
- Occupation: Diplomat
- Awards: President's Award for Distinguished Federal Civilian Service (1966)

Thomas Clifton Mann (November 11, 1912 – January 23, 1999) was an American diplomat who specialized in Latin American affairs. He entered the U.S. Department of State in 1942 and quickly rose through the ranks to become an influential establishment figure. He worked to influence the internal affairs of numerous Latin American nations, typically focusing on economic and political influence rather than direct military intervention. After Lyndon B. Johnson became president in 1963, Mann received a double appointment and was recognized as the U.S. authority on Latin America. In March 1964, Mann outlined a policy of supporting regime change and promoting the economic interests of U.S. businesses. This policy, which moved away from the political centrism of Kennedy's Alliance for Progress, has been called the Mann Doctrine. Mann left the State Department in 1966 and became a spokesperson for the Automobile Manufacturer's Association.

== Early life ==
Born in Laredo, an American city on the border with Mexico, Mann grew up speaking English and Spanish. His father was a lawyer and a Southern Baptist.

He attended Baylor University and Baylor Law School, both in Waco, Texas, where he met his wife, the former Nancy Milling Aynesworth. They later had a son, Clifton Aynesworth Mann. Mann graduated from law school in 1934 and took a job at his father's law firm. He held various posts, as a lawyer in Laredo, in 1934 to 1942.

Thomas C. Mann

US Ambassador to El Salvador
- In office October 11, 1955 – September 24, 1957
- President: Dwight D. Eisenhower
- Preceded by: Robert C. Hill
- Succeeded by: Thorsten V. Kalijarvi

US Ambassador to Mexico
- In office April 18, 1961 – December 22, 1963
- President: John F. Kennedy
- Preceded by: Robert C. Hill
- Succeeded by: Fulton Freeman

4th Under Secretary of State for Economic Affairs
- In office March 18, 1965 – May 31, 1966
- Preceded by: George W. Ball
- Succeeded by: William J. Casey

7th and 10th Assistant Secretary of State for Inter-American Affairs
- In office August 28, 1960 – April 20, 1961
- Preceded by: Roy R. Rubottom Jr.
- Succeeded by: Robert F. Woodward
- In office January 3, 1964 – March 17, 1965
- Preceded by: Edwin M. Martin
- Succeeded by: Jack Hood Vaughn

5th Assistant Secretary of State for Economic Affairs
- In office 1957–1960
- Preceded by: Thorsten V. Kalijarvi
- Succeeded by: Edwin M. Martin

== Early career ==
Mann was rejected from the Navy due to poor vision. He joined the Diplomatic Service, United States Department Of State in 1942, and was deployed to Montevideo in Uruguay to investigate Nazi shipping. In 1943, he was promoted to do this job across Latin America. He was involved in creating the 1945 Act of Chapultepec treaty for mutual defense of trans-American nations.

== Truman administration ==
After unsuccessfully coordinating US opposition to Juan Perón in the 1946 Argentine election, he directed US diplomats in Latin America to avoid supporting particular candidates in elections—lest they suffer due to the perceived association. He commented during the 1950 Guatemalan election:

At election time it is just political suicide to try to defend the United States... I think on the whole people in the other American Republics understand and support us, but it isn't good politics to say so at election time. We are a sort of punching bag during elections. Everybody likes to take a swing at us, and makes sure he does every time you say something.

Mann sought military assistance from Latin American countries during the Korean War, commenting "that if the Bolivians were complaining about spilling their blood for Yankees, a lot of Yankees were also complaining about American blood already being spilled in Korea for Bolivia and other countries of the hemisphere".

Mann believed that nationalism and Communism were related problems, and sought to prevent both as part of efforts to prevent Latin nationalization of resources. In a surprise to many observers, he agreed to secure US aid for Bolivia following the 1952 Bolivian revolution, partly as a reward for the new government's agreement to compensate US tin companies for nationalized assets.

== Eisenhower administration ==
=== Policy shift ===
In 1952, Mann welcomed the incoming Eisenhower administration with a 42-page memo on US relations with Latin America.

The memo argued that the main issue for the US in this region was not a Communist invasion, but the problem of US control over "readily accessible essential strategic materials". These included vanadium as well as crude petroleum, resources which the US imported mostly from Latin America. Mann advocated swift US intervention to retaliate against nationalizations, as a show of force to deter similar actions by other countries. This memo was a source for NSC 144/1, representing the incoming Eisenhower administration's new policy on Latin America.

=== Guatemala ===
In Guatemala, Mann attended the inauguration of President Jacobo Árbenz Guzmán and pronounced him a communist. Although he resisted early overtures by United Fruit representatives to intervene, he opposed Árbenz's land reform law, fearing that Guatemala would provide a test case for other nations. After the CIA-backed military coup in 1954, Mann was recalled from Greece to Guatemala. He established Norman Armour as the US ambassador and sought to bolster the new military government of Castillo Armas. Mann reportedly gained de facto veto power over Guatemalan policy; after Mann had rejected a new oil law, Armas said he would come to "no final decision without consulting with Mr. Mann."

Mann later reflected that US operatives in Guatemala had an "illusion of omnipotence", saying in 1975:

We were on the crest of a wave and nobody, literally nobody on the Hill or anywhere else ever questioned our ability to do anything if we wanted to do it [and] if we were willing to spend the money and the effort to do it.

=== Economic aid ===
In late September 1957 Mann moved to Washington, D.C., to become Assistant Secretary of State for Economic Affairs. Trans-American economic problems had created dissatisfaction and threatened to push Latin American countries away from the US. Secretary of State John Foster Dulles blamed an "economic war" waged by Moscow. Vice President Richard Nixon was mobbed by angry protestors in Venezuela and elsewhere. Mann advocated policies of robust economic assistance, establishing the Inter-American Development Bank and promoting low-interest loans financed by the US government. Mann pushed for "a Marshall Plan for Latin America" which would also include private finance. Eisenhower concurred, and appointed Mann as Assistant Secretary of State for Inter-American Affairs in August 1960.

== Kennedy administration ==
President John F. Kennedy promoted the Alliance for Progress, a centrist initiative to support Latin American economies and stave off communism through moderate reform.

Mann did not support the Bay of Pigs invasion, which had been planned by the CIA before Kennedy took office. He doubted the possibility of a popular uprising and, with Kennedy, opposed involvement by the US Air Force. He resigned his position at the State Department just weeks before the invasion took place in April 1961. In general, Mann felt that military action against Cuba would be too damaging for the US image. Instead, he supported economic sanctions to create suffering and dissatisfaction among the Cuban poor.

Kennedy appointed Mann United States Ambassador to Mexico where he successfully negotiated a settlement of the Chamizal border between the US and Mexican governments, caused by a shift in the Rio Grande.

== Johnson administration ==
On December 14, 1963, new President Lyndon B. Johnson re-appointed Mann Assistant Secretary of State for Inter-American Affairs. On December 21, Johnson also made Mann the head of the US Agency for International Development (USAID), an organization created by President Kennedy two years earlier. The double-appointment was opposed by the Kennedys and their liberal supporters, including Senator Hubert Humphrey and advisor Arthur Schlesinger Jr. Schlesinger wrote that Johnson's appointment of Mann constituted "a declaration of independence, even perhaps a declaration of aggression against the Kennedys." Members of the United States corporate establishment, generally felt they had a good relationship with Mann and supported the appointment.

=== Mann Doctrine ===
In March 1964, the new Johnson administration held a three-day policy conference for all U.S. diplomats in Latin America. On March 18, Mann gave a secret speech to U.S. officials which laid out the administration's policy for the region. Mann did not discuss the Alliance for Progress. His policy called for non-intervention against dictators if they were friendly to US business interests, but intervention against Communists regardless of their policies. The content of Mann's speech was leaked to the New York Times. His comments were interpreted as prioritizing US economic interests over political reform, and the thrust of this policy became known as the "Mann Doctrine".

=== Brazil ===
Later that month, Mann supported the military overthrow of the democratically elected government in Brazil, claiming a victory against Communism. Mann assisted this takeover directly by diverting US aid to Brazil away from the Goulart's central government. US operatives interpreted the March 18 Mann Doctrine as a "green light" for the coup to go forward. After the coup, Mann stated that "the frustration of Communistic objectives in Brazil was the single most important victory for freedom in the hemisphere in recent years".

=== Chile ===
In Chile, Mann ordered an intensive and coordinated campaign in favor of Eduardo Frei against Salvador Allende in the 1964 elections. In a May 1 memo to Secretary of State Dean Rusk, Mann wrote:

Clearly, the September election will be determined by factors which are deeply rooted in the political, economic, and social fabric of the Chilean scene and by the campaign abilities of the major contenders. Given the consequences, however, if this major Latin American nation should become the first country in the hemisphere to freely choose an avowed Marxist as its elected president, the Department, CIA, and other agencies have embarked on a major campaign to prevent Allende's election and to support Frei, the only candidate who has a chance of beating him.

Mann described a ten-point plan, which included:

- threats of economic retaliation against Chile if Allende won;
- CIA and USIA production and dissemination of unattributed propaganda against Allende;
- $70 million in emergency loans to prop up the economy and reduce unemployment before the election; and
- secret contacts of US government and businesses with Chilean business, military, police, clergy, trade unions, and Masons, for the purpose of opposing Allende.

These efforts were successful in 1964 but reversed in 1970.

=== Bolivia ===
In Bolivia, when General René Barrientos Ortuño led a takeover of the popular Revolutionary Nationalist Movement (MNR) government, which had been in power for twelve years, Mann secured aid for the new military government.

=== Panama ===
Mann later served in Panama during a period of intense agitation waged by Panamanians against the Panama Canal Zone. Mann began some successful negotiations with Panama, but was undercut by Johnson, who did not want to capitulate for political reasons.

=== Dominican Republic ===
In the Dominican Republic, Mann labeled democratically elected President Juan Bosch a communist and supported the US invasion in 1965. In April 1965, Mann personally insisted on the production of a cable which would describe danger to American citizens in the Dominican Republic. At the same time, Mann pressured the military government to crack down on insurgents in Santo Domingo. Mann described the popular rebellion as Communist infiltration enabled by Castro and supported the U.S. invasion as a necessary response.

=== Promotion and resignation ===
Mann became the Undersecretary of State for Economic Affairs in 1965. He was bestowed the President's Award for Distinguished Federal Civilian Service by President Johnson in 1966. This is the highest award that can be given to a career civilian employee of the federal government. Mann was cited as having "represented the United States with outstanding judgment, initiative, intelligence, and vision." He resigned from the State Department in June 1966 and served as president of the Automobile Manufacturer's Association from 1967 through 1971.

== Personal life ==
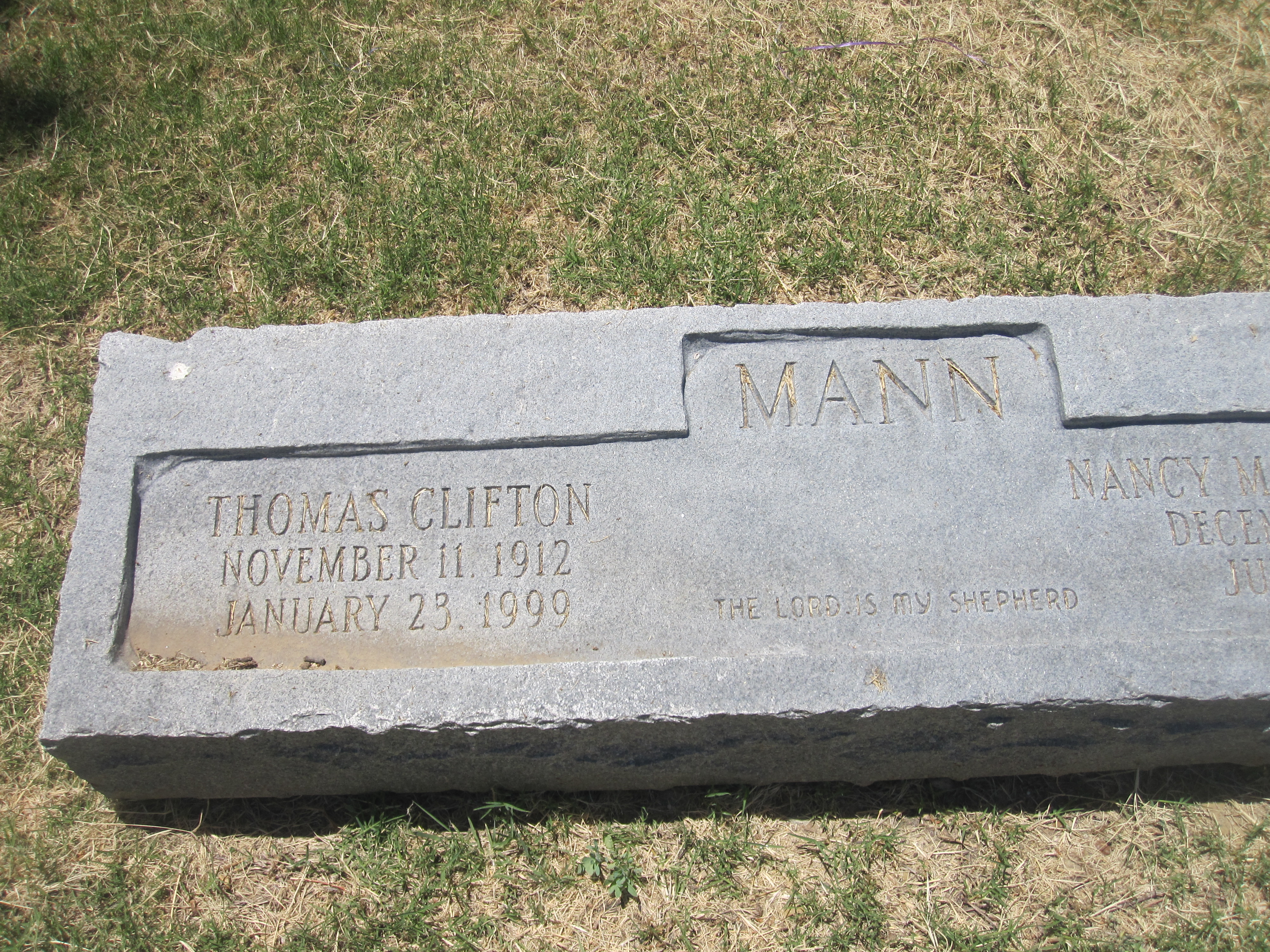
Thomas C. Mann grave marker at Laredo City Cemetery

Mann was a brother of the late Laredo attorney Samuel Edward "Ed" Mann, a 1923 graduate of the University of Texas Law School and an inductee into the prestigious legal honor society, Crossroads. He died on January 23, 1999, in Lubbock, Texas.

Mann Road in Laredo is named for the Mann family. Thomas Mann is interred at Laredo City Cemetery.

Diplomatic posts
Preceded by Robert C. Hill	United States Ambassador to El Salvador; November 24, 1955 – September 24, 1957	Succeeded by Thorsten V. Kalijarvi
Preceded by Robert C. Hill	U.S. Ambassador to Mexico; May 8, 1961 – December 22, 1963	Succeeded by Fulton Freeman
Government offices
Preceded by Thorsten Valentine Kalijarvi	Assistant Secretary of State for Economic Affairs; September 30, 1957 – August 28, 1960	Succeeded by Edwin McCammon Martin
Preceded by Roy R. Rubottom Jr.	Assistant Secretary of State for Inter-American Affairs; August 28, 1960 – April 20, 1961	Succeeded by Robert F. Woodward
Preceded by Edwin M. Martin	Assistant Secretary of State for Inter-American Affairs; January 3, 1964 – March 17, 1965	Succeeded by Jack Vaughn
Preceded by George Wildman Ball	Under Secretary of State for Economic Affairs; March 18, 1965 – May 31, 1966	Succeeded by William J. Casey
