= Michael J. McDermott =

American diplomat (1894–1955)

1st Spokesperson for the United States Department of State
- In office 1927–1945
- Preceded by: Position established
- Succeeded by: Roger Tubby

Personal details
- Born: 1894
- Died: 1955 (aged 60–61)

Michael J. McDermott (1894–1955) was a US diplomat who rose to the Office of U.S. Ambassador, serving from the 1930s onward.

== Biography ==
Michael James McDermott was born in 1894 and his State of Residence has been described as the District of Columbia.

By 1932, Michael J. McDermott had found employment with the U.S. Department of State as what the department often referred to as a "Non-Career Appointee". In April, 1932, he held the Office of 'Chief, Division of Current Information, Department of State'. While still holding this Office, on October 18 of 1943, M.J. McDermott was a Member of the American Delegation at the three Government Summit known simply as the Moscow Conference (1943). Within less than a year after this conference in the USSR, M.J. McDermott had earned a new job title by August, 1944 - 'Special Assistant to the Secretary of State'. By July, 1946, Michael J. McDermott had earned yet another change in his job title to 'Special Assistant to the Secretary of State for Press Relations'; it was with this job title that Michael J. McDermott was a Member of the American Delegation to the 1946 Paris Peace Treaties, 1947 Conference. McDermott held the job title of 'Special Assistant to the Secretary of State for Press Relations' until December 1952. Thereafter, in 1952-1953, he was briefly reassigned to be the 'Special Assistant for Press Relations in the Office of the Secretary of State' before he retires from media relations within the U.S. Department of State.

However, on May 28, 1953, the Eisenhower Administration has Michael J. McDermott appointed the 6th U.S. Ambassador to El Salvador; he presented his Credentials on June 25, 1953 and would not leave his Post until September 28 of 1954. Thus he served at this post during the CIA's overthrow of Jacobo Arbenz Guzman who was the democratically elected 25th President of the nearby nation of Guatemala. While serving in El Salvador, Ambassador M.J. McDermott was briefed by the CIA on its program - code named Operation PBSuccess - to overthrow Jacobo Arbenz.

After retirement as a U.S. Ambassador in 1954, Michael James McDermott died in 1955 and was honored with burial at the Arlington National Cemetery in Arlington, County of Arlington, Virginia.

Diplomatic posts
Preceded by Angier Biddle Duke	United States Ambassador to El Salvador; June 25, 1953 – September 28, 1954	Succeeded by Robert C. Hill
