= Julius Katz =

American diplomat (1925–1999)

13th Assistant Secretary of State for Economic and Business Affairs
- In office 1976–1979
- President: Gerald Ford; Jimmy Carter
- Preceded by: Joseph A. Greenwald
- Succeeded by: Deane R. Hinton

Personal details
- Born: Julius Louis Katz; March 9, 1925 New York City, U.S.
- Died: 1999 (aged 73–74)
- Spouse: Charlotte Friedman
- Children: 3
- Education: George Washington University (BA)

Military service
- Allegiance: United States
- Branch/service: United States Army
- Years of service: 1943–1945

Julius Louis Katz (March 9, 1925, in New York, NY – 1999) was United States Assistant Secretary of State for Economic and Business Affairs, appointed by Gerald Ford. He served in that post from 1976 to 1979.

He served in the U.S. Army from 1943 to 1945. He got his B.A. in 1949 from the George Washington University and did graduate work until 1950 when he was hired by the State Department. Between 1950 and 1968 his positions included Economic Adviser in the Office of Eastern European Affairs, Director of International Trade, and Director of International Commodities. He was, from 1968 to 1974, Deputy Assistant Secretary of State for International Resources and Food Policy, and Senior Deputy Assistant Secretary of State from 1974 to 1976.

After leaving the State Department during the Carter administration he held several positions in the private sector. In 1989 he was nominated by President George H. W. Bush to be Deputy United States Trade Representative. He held this position until 1993.

Katz married Charlotte Friedman and they had three children.
