= Thorsten V. Kalijarvi =

American diplomat (1897–1980)

United States Ambassador to El Salvador
- In office September 7, 1957 – December 18, 1960
- President: Dwight D. Eisenhower
- Preceded by: Thomas C. Mann
- Succeeded by: Murat W. Williams

4th Assistant Secretary of State for Economic Affairs
- In office March 14, 1957 – September 26, 1957
- President: Dwight D. Eisenhower
- Preceded by: Samuel C. Waugh
- Succeeded by: Thomas C. Mann

Personal details
- Born: Thorsten Valentine Kalijarvi; December 22, 1897 Gardner, Massachusetts, U.S.
- Died: June 5, 1980 (aged 82) Mount Vernon, Virginia, U.S.
- Education: Clark University

Thorsten Valentine Kalijarvi (December 22, 1897 – June 5, 1980) served as Assistant Secretary of State for Economic and Business Affairs in the United States under President Dwight D. Eisenhower in 1957. He also served as Ambassador to El Salvador from 1957 to 1961.

== Biography ==
Kalijarvi was born in Gardner, Massachusetts, on December 22, 1897. He graduated with a bachelor's and master's degree from Clark University in 1923. In 1935, Kalijarvi received his doctorate from the University of Berlin. He also studied at The Hague Academy of International Law and the Geneva Graduate Institute. From 1927 to 1945, he taught government at the University of New Hampshire, where he also served as the head of the political science department. He lectured at American University and Johns Hopkins University.

In 1947, Kalijarvi started work in Washington as a consultant on European affairs for the Library of Congress and the Senate Foreign Relations Committee. In 1950, he joined the Department of State. He worked as an ambassador from 1957 to 1960 and retired in 1961. Following his retirement, he continued to work in Washington, serving on different committees for the U.S. Chamber of Commerce.

Kalijarvi died on June 5, 1980, in Alexandria, Virginia.

Diplomatic posts
Preceded by Thomas C. Mann	United States Ambassador to El Salvador; September 7, 1957 – December 18, 1960	Succeeded by Murat W. Williams
Government offices
Preceded by Samuel C. Waugh	Assistant Secretary of State for Economic Affairs; March 14, 1957 – September 26, 1957	Succeeded by Thomas C. Mann
