= National Center for Housing Management =

The National Center for Housing Management, Inc. (NCHM) was created by the Secretary of the U.S. Department of Housing and Urban Development (HUD), George W. Romney, pursuant to an Executive Order of President Richard Nixon in 1972. The President took the action on the recommendation of a blue-ribbon task force of national housing leaders chaired by Carter L. Burgess, the then Chairman of the National Corporation of Housing Partnerships (Executive Order No. 11668). The task force was made up of 13 members chosen by the President. The task force recognized that the country was in the process of greatly expanding its inventory of affordable housing but lacked the cadre of professional managers needed to successfully operate that inventory. President Nixon tasked NCHM with the mission of establishing industry standards for management and developing the training and other resources necessary to help achieve those standards.

NCHM was established as a private, 501(c)(3) non-profit organization – not a federal agency – so that it would be free from political influence and able to establish meaningful and objective industry standards.

NCHM's first president was Samuel J. Simmons. He served from 1972 to 1981. Simmons was previously Assistant Secretary for Equal Opportunity of the U.S. Department of Housing and Urban Development and Director of Field Operations for the U.S. Commission on Civil Rights. After leaving NCHM he became the President and Chief Executive Officer of the National Caucus and Center on Black Aged, Inc. NCHM's current president, Paul R. Votto, was appointed to the position in February 2018.

NCHM carries out its mission through professional training, certification, and other employee development services to both public and private housing organizations. Certifications offered by NCHM include: Certified Occupancy Specialist, Tax Credit Specialist, Blended Occupancy Specialist, Certified Manager of Housing, Certified Manager of Senior Housing, Certified Manager of Maintenance, Certified Financial Specialist, Registered Housing Manager, Fair Housing Specialist, HOME Compliance Specialist, Management and Occupancy Review Specialist, Enterprise Income Verification Specialist and Rural Housing Specialist.

On March 19, 2019, NCHM launched the Veterans for Housing Initiative. The Initiative's mission is to recruit and train veterans of the US armed services for careers in housing management, with an emphasis on affordable housing. NCHM has pledged $1,000,000 in training and certification scholarships for veterans not currently employed in the housing industry. Since its inception, the Initiative has provided free training to hundreds of veterans and service members transitioning to civilian life.

NCHM was a major financial contributor to the "Save the Soldiers Home" project on the grounds of the Clement J. Zablocki VA Medical Center in Milwaukee, Wisconsin. The overall project will eventually renovate and restore six historic buildings, some dating back to the 1860s. The restoration of the main building was completed in 2021 and resulted in the creation of 101 supportive housing units for veterans and their families who are either homeless or at risk of being homeless. The Milwaukee Soldiers Home is one of the three original Soldiers' Homes in the U.S. and was the result of one of the last pieces of legislation signed in 1865 by President Abraham Lincoln.
