= Harold F. Linder =

American diplomat

Harold Francis Linder
- Born: September 13, 1900; Brooklyn, New York City, New York, U.S.
- Died: July 9, 1981 (aged 80); Manhattan, New York City, New York, U.S.
- Education: Columbia University
- Occupations: Ambassador; Businessman
- Children: 2

Harold F. Linder

2nd Assistant Secretary of State for Economic Affairs
- In office 1952–1953
- Preceded by: Willard Thorp
- Succeeded by: Samuel C. Waugh

Harold Francis Linder (September 13, 1900 – July 9, 1981) was president of the Export-Import Bank of the United States from 1961 to 1968 and United States Ambassador to Canada from 1968 to 1969.

== Biography ==
Harold F. Linder was born to a Jewish family in Brooklyn on September 13, 1900, the son of May L. Linder. He was educated at New York Military Academy and at Columbia College, Columbia University, from which he graduated in 1921.

In the 1930s, Linder worked as an investment banker at Loeb, Rhoades & Co. During World War II, he served in the United States Navy. From 1948 to 1955, he was president of the General American Investors Company.

Linder joined the United States Department of State in 1951 as a Deputy Assistant Secretary. President of the United States Dwight Eisenhower later named Linder Assistant Secretary of State for Economic Affairs. In 1955–56, he was a member of the Board of National Estimates of the Central Intelligence Agency. President John F. Kennedy named Linder president of the Export-Import Bank of the United States in 1961.

In 1968, President Lyndon Johnson appointed Linder United States Ambassador to Canada; Ambassador Linder presented his credentials to the Canadian government on September 10, 1968, and served as ambassador until July 9, 1969.

Linder was elected chairman of the board of trustees of the Institute for Advanced Study in 1969. There is an endowed chair at the Institute for Advanced Study named in Linder's honor.

Linder retired in 1972. He died at Lenox Hill Hospital in Manhattan's Upper East Side on June 22, 1981 at the age of 80.

Diplomatic posts
Preceded by William Walton Butterworth	United States Ambassador to Canada; September 10, 1968 – July 9, 1969	Succeeded by Adolph W. Schmidt
