= Willard Thorp =

American economist and presidential advisor

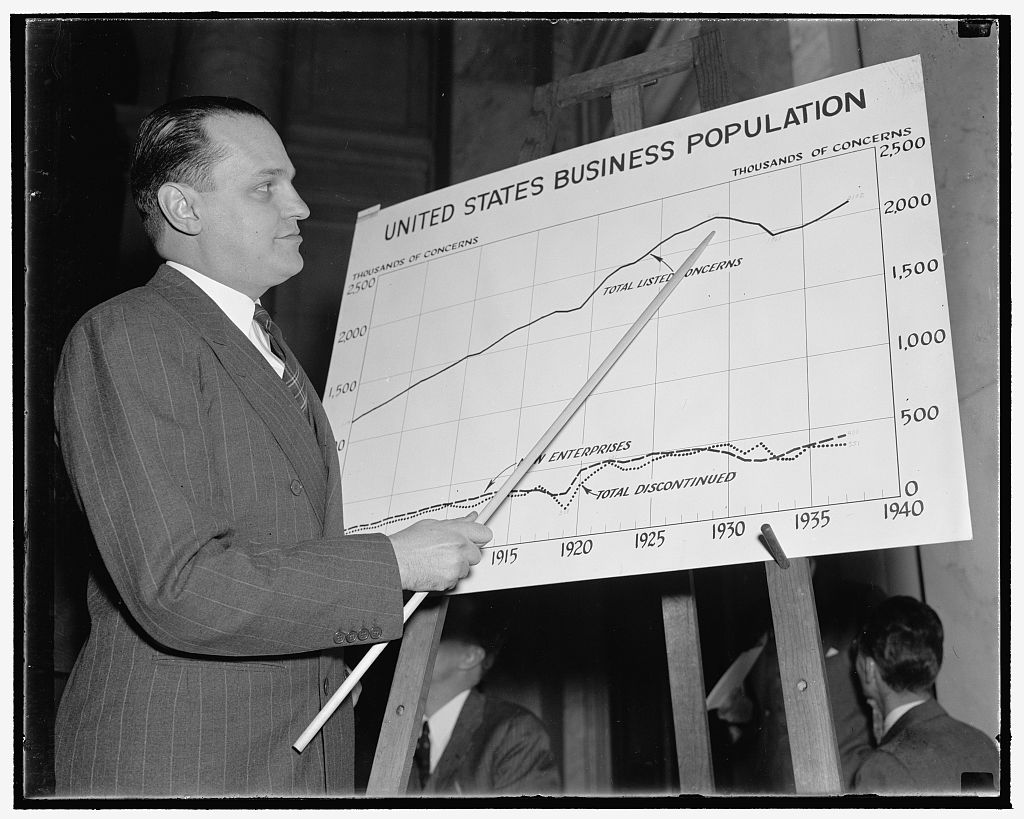
- Thorp testifies at public hearings of the Joint Congressional Executive Monopoly Committee (December 2, 1938)

1st Assistant Secretary of State for Economic Affairs
- In office 1946–1952
- President: Harry S. Truman
- Preceded by: Office established
- Succeeded by: Harold F. Linder

Personal details
- Born: Willard Long Thorp; May 24, 1899 Oswego, New York, U.S.
- Died: May 10, 1992 (aged 92) Pelham, Massachusetts, U.S.
- Education: Amherst College
- Occupation: economist statistician academic public servant

Willard Long Thorp (May 24, 1899 – May 10, 1992) was an American economist and academic. He served three US Presidents, Franklin D. Roosevelt, Harry S. Truman and Dwight D. Eisenhower as an advisor in both domestic and foreign affairs. He helped draft the Marshall Plan and was also prominent in business and education.

== Biography ==
He was born on 24 May 1899 in Oswego, New York. He was raised in Chelsea, Massachusetts and Duluth, Minnesota. He graduated Amherst College in 1920. In 1939 he was elected as a Fellow of the American Statistical Association.

He was Assistant Secretary of State under Truman for Economic Affairs 1946–1952; a member of the U.S. delegation serving as special adviser on economic matters at the Paris Peace Conference of 1946; special adviser on economic matters at the New York meeting of the Council of Foreign Ministers in 1946; and American representative to the United Nations General Assembly, 1947–48.

He came under great strain during the McCarthy 'witch-hunt' investigations into alleged Communists 1950–1954 and eventually resigned, becoming a professor at Amherst College again instead. In 1957, he served for a number of weeks as interim president of the college.

He died on 10 May 1992 in Pelham, Massachusetts.

== Works ==
- Business Annals:United States, England, France, Germany, Austria, Russia, Sweden, Netherlands, Italy, Argentina, Brazil, Canada, South Africa, Australia, India, Japan, China. New York: National Bureau of Economic Research, Inc. 1926 – via Internet Archive.
- Economic Institutions. New York: The Macmillan. 1929 – via Internet Archive.
- Trade, Aid, or What? Report based upon a conference on international economic policy at the Merrill Center for Economics, Summer - 1953. Baltimore: The Johns Hopkins Press. 1954 – via Internet Archive.
