= Robert C. Hill =

American diplomat (1917–1978)

Robert Charles Hill

United States Ambassador to Costa Rica
- In office 4 November 1953 – 10 September 1954
- President: Dwight D. Eisenhower
- Preceded by: Philip B. Fleming
- Succeeded by: Robert F. Woodward

United States Ambassador to El Salvador
- In office 4 November 1954 – 21 September 1955
- President: Dwight D. Eisenhower
- Preceded by: Michael J. McDermott
- Succeeded by: Thomas C. Mann

United States Ambassador to Mexico
- In office 25 July 1957 – 1 December 1960
- President: Dwight D. Eisenhower
- Preceded by: Francis White
- Succeeded by: Thomas C. Mann

53rd United States Ambassador to Spain
- In office 12 June 1969 – 12 January 1972
- President: Richard Nixon
- Preceded by: Robert F. Wagner Jr.
- Succeeded by: Horacio Rivero

39th United States Ambassador to Argentina
- In office February 15, 1974 – May 10, 1977
- President: Richard Nixon
- Preceded by: John Davis Lodge
- Succeeded by: Raúl H. Castro

5th Assistant Secretary of State for Legislative Affairs
- In office March 9, 1956 – June 26, 1957
- Preceded by: Thruston Ballard Morton
- Succeeded by: William B. Macomber Jr.

Personal details
- Born: 30 September 1917 Littleton, New Hampshire, U.S.
- Died: 28 November 1978 (aged 61) Littleton, New Hampshire, U.S.
- Spouse: Cecelia Gordon Bowdoin (m. 1945)
- Education: Taft School 1938; Dartmouth College; Boston University

Robert Charles Hill (September 30, 1917 – November 28, 1978) was an American diplomat.

== Education ==
He was born in Littleton, New Hampshire. He attended Dartmouth College in the class of 1942. In 1947, he was a member of staff on the Senate Banking Committee.

== Ambassador ==
He served as U.S. ambassador to several Latin American countries—El Salvador, Costa Rica and Mexico—and to Spain throughout his career. In 1961–1962, he was elected to the New Hampshire General Court. His last posting was in Argentina in the late 1970s, a period of great unrest in that country. He was also Assistant Secretary of State for Congressional Relations under President Eisenhower and Assistant Secretary of Defense for International Security Affairs under President Nixon.

== Argentinian controversy ==
=== Human rights advocacy ===
In Argentina, the five-time conservative Republican ambassadorial appointee became best known for his efforts to keep the Argentina military junta that took power in March 1976 from engaging in massive human rights violations like those of Captain General Augusto Pinochet in neighboring Chile following his September 1973 coup. Upon finding out that U.S. Secretary of State Henry Kissinger had given the Argentine generals a "green light" for their own so-called "dirty war" in June 1976 while at an Organization of American States meeting in Santiago (at the Hotel Carrera, a place later made famous in the film Missing), Hill immediately engaged in behind-the-scenes efforts to roll back the Kissinger decision. Hill did this although Kissinger aides told him that, if he continued, the Secretary of State would likely have him fired, and even as left-wing Argentine guerrillas attempted to assassinate both the U.S. envoy and members of his family living in Buenos Aires. Hill's role as ambassador to Argentina again became prominent in 2016, when President Barack Obama traveled to that country to mark the 40th anniversary of the dirty "war" generals' supposedly bloodless coup.

=== Disagreement with Kissinger ===
As an article published in The Nation in October 1987 noted: "'Hill was shaken, he became very disturbed, by the case of the son of a thirty-year embassy employee, a student who was arrested, never to be seen again,' recalled former New York Times reporter Juan de Onis. 'Hill took a personal interest.' He went to the Interior Minister, a general with whom he had worked on drug cases, saying, 'Hey, what about this? We're interested in this case.' He questioned (Foreign Minister Cesar) Guzzetti and, finally, President Jorge R. Videla himself. 'All he got was stonewalling; he got nowhere.' de Onis said. 'His last year was marked by increasing disillusionment and dismay, and he backed his staff on human rights right to the hilt."

In a letter to The Nation editor Victor Navasky, protesting publication of the article, Kissinger claimed that: "At any rate, the notion of Hill as a passionate human rights advocate is news to all his former associates."

Kissinger aide Harry W. Shlaudeman later disagreed with Kissinger, telling the oral historian William E. Knight of the Association for Diplomatic Studies and Training Foreign Affairs Oral History Project: "It really came to a head when I was Assistant Secretary, or it began to come to a head, in the case of Argentina where the dirty war was in full flower. Bob Hill, who was Ambassador then in Buenos Aires, a very conservative Republican politician -- by no means liberal or anything of the kind, began to report quite effectively about what was going on, this slaughter of innocent civilians, supposedly innocent civilians -- this vicious war that they were conducting, underground war. He, at one time in fact, sent me a back-channel telegram saying that the Foreign Minister, who had just come for a visit to Washington and had returned to Buenos Aires, had gloated to him that Kissinger had said nothing to him about human rights. I don't know -- I wasn't present at the interview."

Navasky later wrote in his book about being confronted by Kissinger, "'Tell me, Mr. Navasky,' [Kissinger] said in his famous guttural tones, 'how is it that a short article in a obscure journal such as yours about a conversation that was supposed to have taken place years ago about something that did or didn't happen in Argentina resulted in sixty people holding placards denouncing me a few months ago at the airport when I got off the plane in Copenhagen?'"

== Personal life ==
On 1 December 1945, Hill married Cecelia Gordon Bowdoin, who later became known as an accomplished mid-Atlantic tennis champion, duplicate bridge player, and an excellent horse woman. She died on Palm Sunday, 1 April 2012.

Hill's papers are held at Dartmouth College.

Diplomatic posts
Preceded by Philip B. Fleming	United States Ambassador to Costa Rica; 4 November 1953 – 10 September 1954	Succeeded by Robert F. Woodward
Preceded by Michael J. McDermott	United States Ambassador to El Salvador; 4 November 1954 – 21 September 1955	Succeeded by Thomas C. Mann
Preceded by Francis White	United States Ambassador to Mexico; 25 July 1957 – 1 December 1960	Succeeded by Thomas C. Mann
Preceded by Robert F. Wagner Jr.	United States Ambassador to Spain; 12 June 1969 – 12 January 1972	Succeeded by Horacio Rivero
Preceded by John Davis Lodge	United States Ambassador to Argentina; 15 February 1974 – 10 May 1977	Succeeded by Raúl H. Castro
Government offices
Preceded by Thruston Ballard Morton	Assistant Secretary of State for Legislative Affairs; 9 March 1956 – 6 June 1957	Succeeded by William B. Macomber Jr.
