= Murat W. Williams =

American diplomat

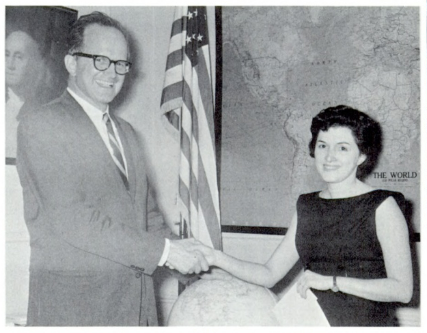
- Ambassador Murat W. Williams with Mrs. Mariella Ruiz Quiros in the US embassy in El Salvador

US Ambassador to El Salvador
- In office February 21, 1961 – July 4, 1964
- President: John F. Kennedy
- Preceded by: Thorsten V. Kalijarvi
- Succeeded by: Raúl H. Castro

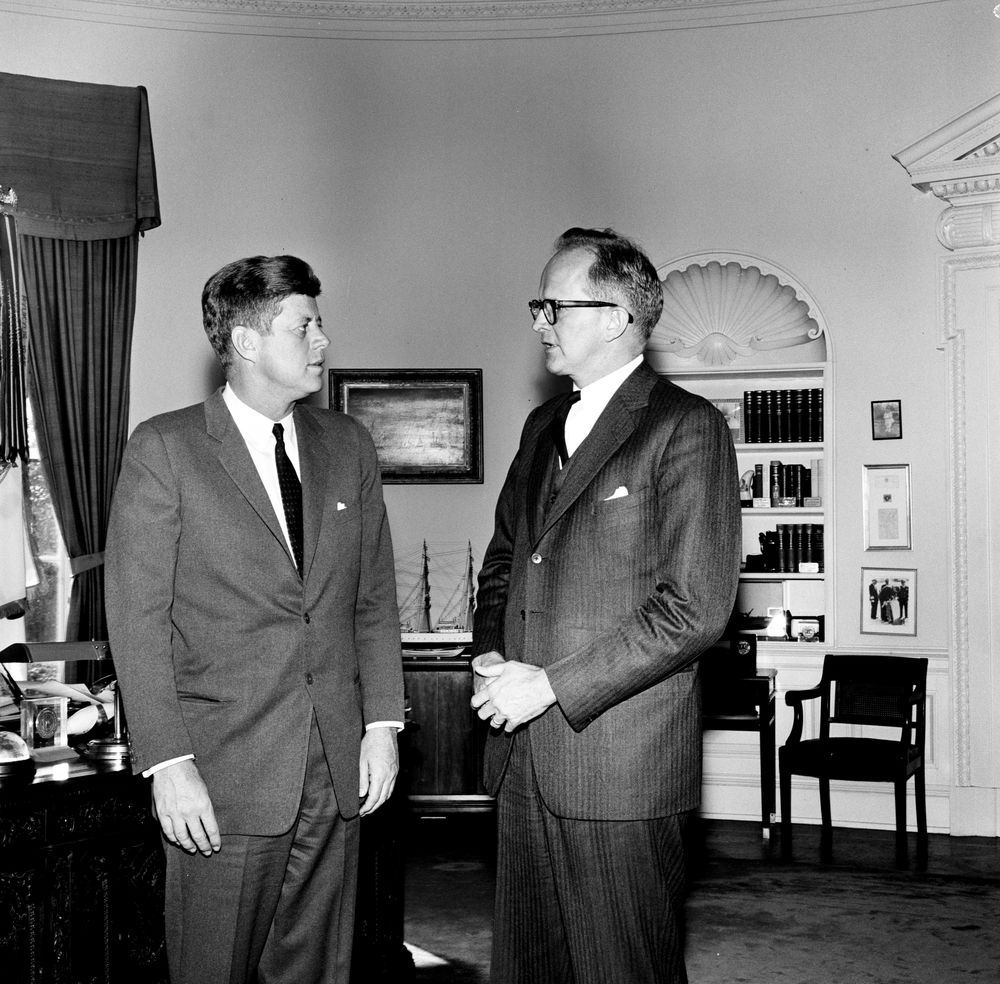
John F. Kennedy meeting with Ambassador Williams

Murat Willis Williams (1919 in Richmond, Virginia – March 31, 1994 in Charlottesville, Virginia) was an American Career Foreign Service officer who was Ambassador to El Salvador from 1961 to 1964.

A graduate of the University of Virginia and a Rhodes Scholar at Oxford for three years, Williams served as a lieutenant commander in the Navy during World War II before joining the Foreign Service. Williams died of a stroke in Charlottesville, Virginia at the age of 79.
