= Samuel C. Waugh =

American official with the U.S. Department of State

3rd Assistant Secretary of State for Economic Affairs
- In office 1953–1955
- Preceded by: Harold F. Linder
- Succeeded by: Thorsten V. Kalijarvi

Personal details
- Born: April 28, 1890 Plattsmouth, Nebraska
- Died: July 30, 1970 (aged 80)
- Education: University of Nebraska

Samuel Clark Waugh (April 28, 1890 – July 30, 1970) was an American official with the U.S. Department of State. Waugh was born in Plattsmouth, Nebraska and from 1911 to 1912 was a student at the University of Nebraska.

From 1913 to 1961, Waugh served with the First Trust Company in Lincoln, Nebraska, in various capacities, until finally serving as president and director. During this time, Waugh served in several public capacities. From 1953 to 1955, Waugh was the Assistant Secretary of State for Economic Affairs at the United States Department of State. From 1953 to 1958, he was the Alternate Governor of the International Bank for Reconstruction and Development. In 1955, he served as Deputy Under Secretary of State. After leaving the State Department in 1955, Waugh became President and Chairman of the Board of the Export-Import Bank of the United States and served in the capacity until 1961.
