= Hugo Yue-Ho Yon =

American diplomat

Hugo Y. Yon
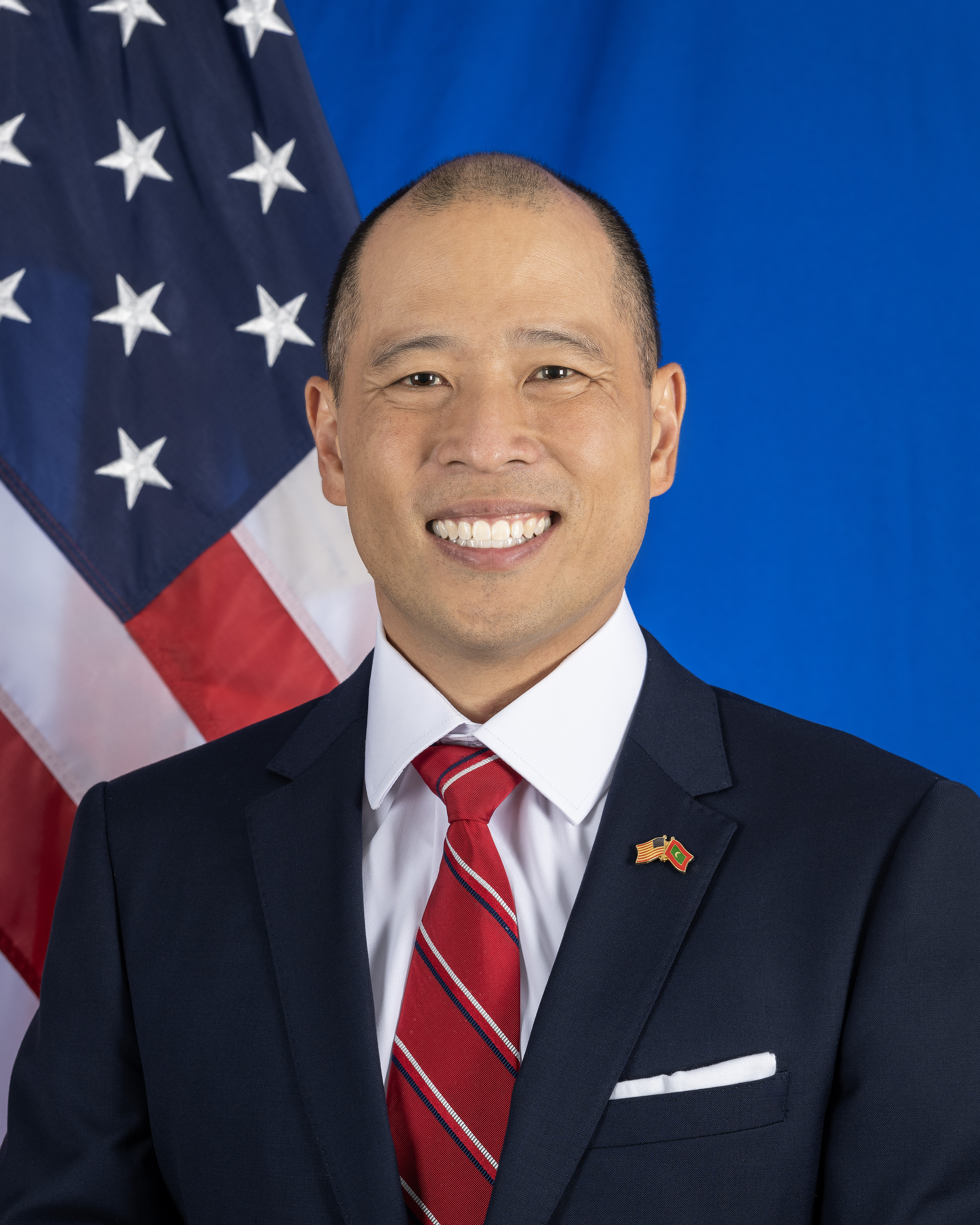

1st United States Ambassador to the Maldives
- In office September 6, 2023 – December 10, 2025
- President: Joe Biden; Donald Trump
- Preceded by: Julie J. Chung (Ambassador to Sri Lanka)
- Succeeded by: Chunnong Saeger (acting)

Personal details
- Education: University of California-Berkeley (BA); Princeton University (MPA)

Hugo Yue-Ho Yon is an American diplomat who is currently serving Principal Deputy Assistant Secretary of State for Economic and Business Affairs. He previously served as the U.S. ambassador to the Maldives.

== Early life and education ==
Yon earned a bachelor's degree from the University of California at Berkeley and a Master of Public Affairs degree from the Princeton School of Public and International Affairs.

== Career ==
Yon is a career member of the Senior Foreign Service, with the rank of Minister-Counselor. He currently serves as a senior advisor in the Office of the Under Secretary of State for Economic Growth, Energy, and the Environment within the U.S. Department of State in Washington, D.C. Yon also served as the Acting Principal Deputy Assistant Secretary in the State Department's Bureau of International Organization Affairs, and before this assignment, he served as the Deputy Assistant Secretary for Transportation Affairs within the Bureau of Economic and Business Affairs. Yon also served as the Director for International Economics and Finance, and as Director for India and the Subcontinent, both at the White House National Security Council. Overseas assignments include serving as the Deputy Minister Counselor for Economic Affairs at the U.S. Embassy in New Delhi, India; Deputy Economic Counselor of the U.S. Embassy in Jakarta, Indonesia; and as Deputy Financial Attaché at the U.S. Embassy in Beijing, China.

=== Ambassador to the Maldives ===
On July 27, 2022, President Joe Biden announced his intent to nominate Yon to be the next ambassador to the Maldives. On July 28, 2022, his nomination was sent to the United States Senate. His nomination was not acted upon for the rest of the year and was returned to President Biden on January 3, 2023.

President Biden re-nominated Yon the same day. Hearings on his nomination were held before the Senate Foreign Relations Committee on March 15, 2023. The committee favorably reported it on April 27, 2023. His nomination was confirmed by the full Senate on July 27, 2023, via voice vote. He presented his credentials to President Ibrahim Mohamed Solih on September 6, 2023.

== Personal life ==
Yon speaks Cantonese, Mandarin Chinese, and Indonesian.
