= Carter L. Burgess =

American politician

37th United States Ambassador to Argentina
- In office August 21, 1968 – March 14, 1969
- Preceded by: Edwin M. Martin
- Succeeded by: John Davis Lodge

Personal details
- Born: December 31, 1916 Roanoke, Virginia
- Died: August 18, 2002 (aged 85) Roanoke, Virginia
- Spouse: May Gardner (m. 1941)
- Education: Virginia Military Institute

Carter Lane Burgess (December 31, 1916 – August 18, 2002) was an American soldier, business executive, and diplomat.

== Life ==
He graduated from Virginia Military Institute. He served in World War II, as an assistant to Dwight D. Eisenhower. From September 24, 1954, to January 22, 1957, he was Assistant Secretary of Defense (Manpower and Personnel). From January 1957 to January 1958, he was president of Trans World Airlines. In 1958, he was president of American Machine and Foundry. Also in 1958 he was appointed to the President's Council on Youth Fitness. In 1968 he was appointed ambassador to Argentina. Burgess also served as Chairman of the National Corporation of Housing Partnerships and the National Center for Housing Management.

== Family ==
In 1941, he married May Gardner Burgess. She died in 1990.
