= Francis White (diplomat) =

American diplomat

Francis White (left) and Marcel-Henri Jaspar (1957)

Francis White (March 4, 1892 – 1961) was an American diplomat. He was born in Baltimore. He served as U.S. Minister to Czechoslovakia in 1933, U.S. Ambassador to Mexico between 1953 and 1957, and U.S. Ambassador to Sweden between 1957 and 1958.

== Notes ==
Diplomatic posts
Preceded by William O'Dwyer	U.S. Ambassador to Mexico; 1953–57	Succeeded by Robert C. Hill
Preceded by John M. Cabot	U.S. Ambassador to Sweden; 1957–58	Succeeded by James C.H. Bonbright
