= List of ambassadors of the United States to Maldives =

Ambassador of the United States to Maldives
- Seal of the United States Department of State

- Flag of a United States ambassador

- Incumbent; David Williams; Chargé d'affaires since May 19, 2026
- Nominator: The president of the United States
- Appointer: The president; with Senate advice and consent
- Inaugural holder: Hugo Yue-Ho Yon as Ambassador
- Formation: 2023
- Website: mv.usembassy.gov

This is a list of ambassadors of the United States to the Maldives.

The United States has had friendly relations with the Republic of Maldives since the nation's independence from the United Kingdom in 1966. The US Mission to the Maldives was previously based in the US Embassy in Colombo, as the United States Ambassador to Sri Lanka. The US opened a new embassy in the Maldives in 2023, with Ambassador Yon presenting his credentials to the President of the Maldives Ibrahim Mohamed Solih, becoming the US' first resident ambassador in the country.

== Ambassadors ==
Name	Title	Appointed	Presented credentials	Terminated mission	Notes
Hugo Yue-Ho Yon - Career FSO	Ambassador Extraordinary and Plenipotentiary	July 27, 2023	September 6, 2023	December 10, 2025	
Chunnong Saeger - Career FSO	Chargé d'affaires ad interim	December 11, 2025		May 19, 2026	
David Williams - Career FSO	Chargé d'affaires ad interim	May 19, 2026		Present	

== See also ==
- Maldives – United States relations
- Foreign relations of the Maldives
- Ambassadors of the United States
