= Edwin M. Martin =

American diplomat (1908–2002)

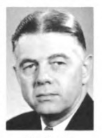

6th Assistant Secretary of State for Economic Affairs
- In office 1960–1962
- President: Dwight D. Eisenhower
- Preceded by: Thomas C. Mann
- Succeeded by: Gove Griffith Johnson Jr.

9th Assistant Secretary of State for Inter-American Affairs
- In office May 18, 1962 – January 2, 1964
- President: John F. Kennedy
- Preceded by: Robert F. Woodward
- Succeeded by: Thomas C. Mann

36th United States Ambassador to Argentina
- In office January 29, 1964 – January 5, 1968
- President: Lyndon B. Johnson
- Preceded by: Robert M. McClintock
- Succeeded by: Carter L. Burgess

Personal details
- Born: May 21, 1908 Dayton, Ohio
- Died: January 12, 2002 (aged 93) Washington, D.C.
- Spouse: Margaret Milburn
- Profession: Statistian, Diplomat

Edwin McCammon Martin (May 21, 1908 – January 12, 2002) was an American economist and diplomat. He worked for the United States government from 1935 to 1975, first as an economist, then on the mobilization of the U.S. economy for World War II and finally as a diplomat both domestically and abroad.

== Biography ==
Edwin M. Martin was born in Dayton, Ohio, on May 21, 1908. He was educated at Northwestern University, receiving a B.A. in 1929. He stayed at Northwestern until 1935 as a graduate student in the political science department, but did not receive another degree.

Martin became an economist at the Central Statistical Board within the Commerce Department in 1935. A year later, he married Margaret Milburn of Baltimore, Maryland. The Martins had a daughter and a son. From 1938 to 1940, Martin served with the Bureau of Labor Statistics.

During World War II, Martin served with the War Production Board from 1940 to 1944. He became Chief of the Urgency Ratings Division in 1943. In 1944, he joined the Office of Strategic Services as Deputy Chief of Division.

== Foreign Service career ==
In 1945, he participated in economic planning for Japan, in light of the anticipated Occupation of Japan, working in the Office of the Assistant Secretary of State for Far Eastern Affairs and as State Department Adviser on Japanese Economic Affairs from August until October. In October 1945, he became Chief of the State Department's Division of Japanese and Korean Economic Affairs. In 1947, Martin was appointed Acting Chief of the Division of Occupied Areas Economic Affairs.

Martin remained at the State Department, becoming Deputy Director of the Office of International Trade Policy in 1948; Director of the Office of European Regional Affairs in 1949; and Special Assistant for Mutual Security Affairs to United States Secretary of State Dean Acheson, in 1952.

In 1953, Martin was named Deputy Chief of the United States Mission to the North Atlantic Treaty Organization and European Regional Organizations and an alternate United States member of the North Atlantic Council in Paris. He served in this post until 1957. The next two years he served at the United States Embassy in London, as Economic Minister.

In 1960, President of the United States Dwight D. Eisenhower named Martin Assistant Secretary of State for Economic Affairs. In April 1961, he served a temporary alternate governor with the U.S. Delegation to the Inter-American Bank Meeting in Brazil. Later that year in August, Martin served as a senior State Department representative on the United States Delegation, to the Special Meeting of the Inter-American Economic and Social Council at Punta del Este, Uruguay. On November 4, Martin traveled to Hakone, Kanagawa, as principal adviser to Secretary of State Dean Rusk and as chief of the U.S. Delegation at the meeting of the Joint United States-Japan Committee on Trade and Economic Affairs.

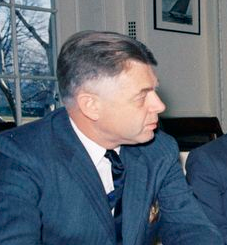
Martin in 1963

In March 1962, President John F. Kennedy appointed Martin as Assistant Secretary of State for Inter-American Affairs, a position he held until January 2, 1964. In that post, he helped direct new Kennedy administration policies toward Latin America, including managing U.S. involvement in the Alliance for Progress. Martin was responsible for Latin American affairs during the Cuban Missile Crisis: he served on the so-called Executive Committee (EXCOMM) created by the President to manage the crisis.

In May 1963, he headed the U.S. delegation to a meeting of the United Nations Economic Commission for Latin America in Mar del Plata, Argentina. He then acted as Alternate U.S. Representative to the Inter-American Economic and Social Council Conference at the Ministerial Level in Sao Paulo, Brazil in November.

In 1964, President Lyndon B. Johnson named Martin United States Ambassador to Argentina; Martin presented his credentials to the Argentinian government on June 11, 1964 and remained ambassador until January 5, 1968.

From 1968 to 1974, he served as Chairman of the Development Assistance Committee of the Organisation for Economic Co-operation and Development. In 1974, Martin was appointed Special Advisor to Secretary of State to oversee U.S. preparations for the World Food Conference. From 1975 to 1978, Martin served as Chairman of the Consultative Group on Food Production in Developing Countries at the World Bank.

Martin retired from diplomatic service as a Career Ambassador in 1975. From 1975 to 1978, Martin served as Chairman of the Consultative Group on Food Production in Developing Countries at the World Bank. Thereafter he held various positions with Population Crisis Committee and participated in numerous conferences around the world dealing with population and other issues related to economic development.

He died of pneumonia in Washington, D.C. on January 12, 2002.

== Media ==
- Cuban Missile Crisis Revisited. Produced for The Idea Channel by the Free to Choose Network, 1983.
  - Phase I (U1015) (January 22, 1983)
    - Featuring Edwin Martin, McGeorge Bundy, Richard Neustadt, Dean Rusk & Donald Wilson in Atlanta, Georgia.

Government offices
Preceded by Robert F. Woodward	Assistant Secretary of State for Inter-American Affairs; May 18, 1962 – January 2, 1964	Succeeded by Thomas C. Mann
Diplomatic posts
Preceded by Robert McClintock	United States Ambassador to Argentina; June 11, 1964 – January 5, 1968	Succeeded by Carter L. Burgess
