= Assistant Secretary of the Treasury for International Finance and Development =

Position in the U.S. Treasury Department

Assistant Secretary of the Treasury for International Finance
- Flag of an Assistant Secretary of the Treasury
- Incumbent; Jonathan Greenstein since December 2025
- Department of the Treasury
- Style: The Honorable
- Reports to: Under Secretary of the Treasury for International Affairs
- Nominator: President of the United States
- Formation: 1977
- Salary: $155,500 (2010)
- Website: Official website

The Deputy Under Secretary / Designated Assistant Secretary of the Treasury for International Finance is a senior position within the United States Department of the Treasury responsible for advising the Secretary of the Treasury on matters of international finance and economic coordination, and overseeing U.S. participation in the International Monetary Fund. The Assistant Secretary is appointed by the President and confirmed by the Senate.

== Overview ==
The Assistant Secretary is in charge of the Office of International Finance and Development, one of two principal components of the Office of International Affairs within the U.S. Department of the Treasury. The Assistant Secretary oversees seven deputies each with their own Deputy Assistant Secretary, over a dozen offices, and more than 100 personnel. Occupants also hold the rank of Deputy Under Secretary / Designated Assistant Secretary.

== Structure ==
The Deputy Under Secretary / Designated Assistant Secretary reports to the Under Secretary for International Finance and oversees work by the following senior officials:

- Deputy Assistant Secretary for International Monetary Policy
- Deputy Assistant Secretary for Africa and the Middle East
- Deputy Assistant Secretary for Asia
- Deputy Assistant Secretary for Europe and Eurasia
- Deputy Assistant Secretary for the Western Hemisphere

== Duties ==
The Assistant Secretary leads the development and implementation of policies in the areas of international finance, bilateral and regional economic engagement, and international debt. The Assistant Secretary also oversees G-7 and G-20 coordination, currency policy, and serves as an economic emissary to foreign governments. It also leads the development of policies on U.S. participation in the International Monetary Fund.

== List of Assistant Secretaries for International Finance, 1977—present ==
Name	Assumed office	Left office	President served under
C. Fred Bergsten	1977	1981	Jimmy Carter
Marc E. Leland	1981	1984	Ronald Reagan
David C. Mulford	1984	1987	Ronald Reagan
Hollis S. McLoughlin	1987	1989	Ronald Reagan and George H. W. Bush
Charles H. Dallara	1989	1991	George H. W. Bush
Olin L. Wethington	1991	1993	George H. W. Bush
Jeffrey Richard Shafer	1993	1995	Bill Clinton
David A. Lipton	1995	1997	Bill Clinton
Timothy Geithner	1997	July 3, 1998	Bill Clinton
Edwin M. Truman	1999	2001	Bill Clinton
Randal Quarles	April 2001	August 8, 2005	George W. Bush
Clay Lowery	2005	2009	George W. Bush
Charles Collyns	2010	2013	Barack Obama
Ramin Toloui	December 10, 2014	January 20, 2017	Barack Obama
Geoffrey Okamoto (acting)	July 2018	March 19, 2020	Donald Trump
Brent Neiman	March 15, 2023	January 20, 2025	Joe Biden
Robert Kaproth (Acting)	January 20, 2025	December 18, 2025	Donald Trump
Jonathan Greenstein	December 18, 2025	Incumbent	Donald Trump

== See also ==
- Assistant Secretary of the Treasury
