= Scott Swisher =

American politician

Scott Swisher (July 15, 1919 - February 6, 1972) was an Iowan lawyer and politician who served five terms in the Iowa House of Representatives.

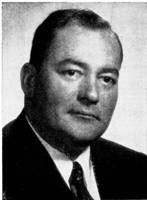
Scott Swisher

== Early life ==
Swisher was born on July 15, 1919, in Iowa City, Iowa to Ingalls and Geneva Hanna Swisher. The Swishers had at least one other child, a son named Robert.

After graduating from Iowa City's public schools, Scott attended the University of Iowa, where he received a Bachelor of Arts degree in 1942. He then proceeded to the University of Iowa College of Law and received his law degree the next year.

== Career ==
Representing Johnson County, Iowa, Swisher was first elected as a Democratic State Representative in 1955. He continued to serve until 1964 in the Fifty-Sixth, Fifty-Seventh, Fifty-Eighth, Fifty-Ninth, and Sixtieth Sessions of the Iowa General Assembly.

Swisher's accomplishments during his career in politics included:

- Minority Floor Leader from 1956 to 1958
- Outstanding State Representative in 1959 by members of the media who covered legislative affairs
- Budget and Financial Control Committee member from 1959 to 1963
- Governor's Board of Penal Affairs member

He was twice a delegate to the Democratic National Convention and served on the Democratic national platform committee in 1960.

== Other activities ==
In addition to his work in politics, Swisher was a practicing attorney at a law firm called Swisher and Swisher in Iowa City.

He held office or membership in many organizations. At various times, he served as:

- President of the Johnson County Bar Association
- Member of the Iowa and American Bar Associations
- Provincial president of Phi Delta Phi
- Member of Omicron Delta Kappa Honorary Scholastic Society
- Member of Rotary International, The Elks, The Loyal Order of Moose, The Fraternal Order of the Eagles, Phi Kappa Psi, and the Knights of Pythias
- Member of the Iowa Historical Society
- Member of the University of Iowa Alumni Association
- Member of the First Presbyterian Church

== Personal life ==
In 1943, Swisher married Nancy J. IlgenFritz. They had a son, Scott, and a daughter, Sarah.

In 1972, at age 52, Swisher suffered a heart attack. He was taken to University Hospital in Iowa City, where he died on February 6. Nancy and both children (as well as Scott's brother Robert) survived him.

After Swisher's death, the Iowa State Legislature read a proclamation that concluded:

"Therefore, Be It Resolved by the House of Representatives of the Sixty-fourth General Assembly of Iowa: That in the passing of the Honorable Scott Swisher, the state has lost an honored citizen and a faithful and useful public servant, and the House by this resolution would express its appreciation of his service, and tender its sympathy to the members of his family."
