= Bureau of Economic and Business Affairs =

Bureau of the United States Department of State

- Seal of the United States Department of State

Bureau overview
- Jurisdiction: Executive branch of the United States
- Headquarters: Harry S. Truman Building, Washington, D.C., United States
- Employees: 222 (as of 2014)
- Annual budget: $12.8 million (FY 2013)
- Bureau executive: Hugo Yue-Ho Yon, Acting Assistant Secretary of State for Economic and Business Affairs
- Parent department: U.S. Department of State
- Website: state.gov/eb

The Bureau of Economic and Business Affairs (EB) is a bureau within the U.S. Department of State tasked with promoting economic security and prosperity at home and abroad. It reports to the Under Secretary of State for Economic Growth, Energy, and the Environment. The Bureau's work lies at the nexus of economic prosperity and national security. In addition, EB also addresses a range of economic issues including intellectual property rights, piracy, and counterfeiting. As the single point where international economic policy tools and threads converge, EB helps to promote a coherent economic policy across the U.S. government. It is headed by the Assistant Secretary of State for Economic and Business Affairs, Caleb Orr. Ramin Toloui led the Bureau from January 2022 to June 2024.

In 2025, the Bureau of Energy Resources was folded into the Bureau of Economic and Business Affairs, forming the Bureau of Economic, Energy, and Business Affairs (EEB).

== Organization ==
The Bureau of Economic and Business Affairs consists of the following divisions:

- Commercial and Business Affairs (EB/CBA);
- Counter Threat Finance & Sanctions (EB/TFS);
- Economic Policy Analysis & Public Diplomacy (EB/EPPD);
- International Communications and Information Policy (EB/CIP);
- International Finance & Development (EB/IFD);
- Trade Policy and Negotiation (EB/TPN); and
- Transportation Affairs (EB/TRA).
