= Ramin Toloui =

American government official

Ramin Toloui Tehrani
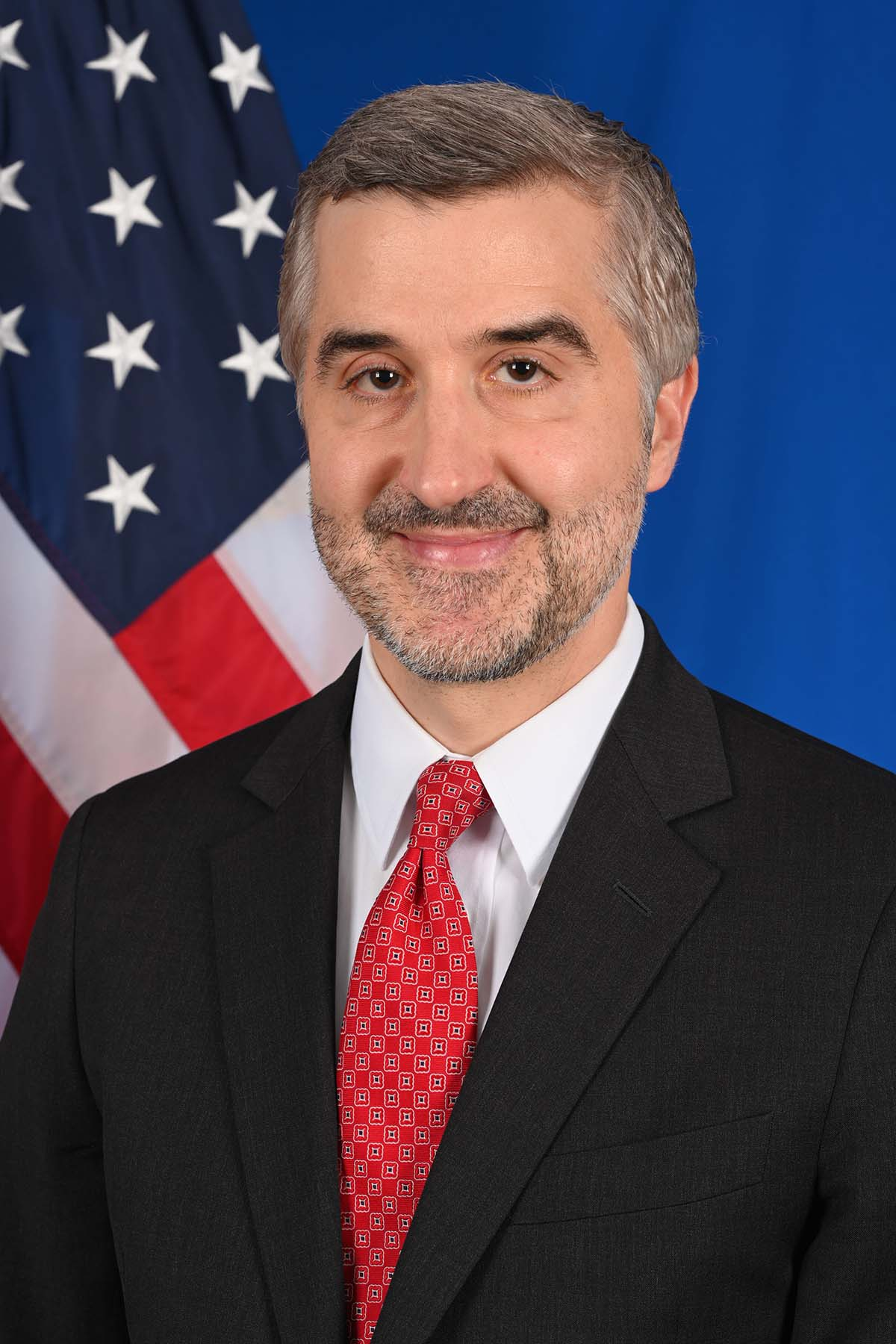

26th Assistant Secretary of State for Economic and Business Affairs
- In office January 24, 2022 – June 28, 2024
- President: Joe Biden
- Preceded by: Manisha Singh
- Succeeded by: Caleb Orr

Assistant Secretary of the Treasury for International Finance and Development
- In office December 10, 2014 – January 20, 2017
- President: Barack Obama
- Preceded by: Charles Collyns
- Succeeded by: Brent Neiman (2023)

Personal details
- Born: Iowa City, Iowa, U.S.
- Education: Harvard University (AB); Balliol College, Oxford (MPhil)

Ramin Toloui Tehrani is an American academic, civil servant, and financial advisor who served as Assistant Secretary of State for Economic and Business Affairs in the Biden Administration.

== Early life and education ==
Toloui was born and raised in Iowa City, Iowa and attended Iowa City High School. He earned a Bachelor of Arts degree from Harvard University and an MPhil from Balliol College at Oxford University.

== Career ==
Toloui served as the global co-head of Emerging Markets Portfolio Management at PIMCO, a position he has held since 2011, and chaired the firm's Asia-Pacific Portfolio Committee since 2012. Toloui joined PIMCO in 2006 as a Portfolio Manager for emerging markets, adding responsibilities for global bond portfolios in 2009. Previously, Toloui held a variety of jobs at the Department of the Treasury, including Director of the Office of the Western Hemisphere from 2003 to 2006, Senior Adviser to the Under Secretary for International Affairs from 2001 to 2003, and Deputy Director and International Economist in the Office of Central and Southeastern Europe from 1999 to 2001.

Toloui was confirmed by the United States Senate on November 20, 2014, to serve as Assistant Secretary of the Treasury for International Finance and Development. In this position, Toloui was responsible for leading the department's work on international monetary affairs, coordination with the G-20 intergovernmental forum, and regional and bilateral economic issues.

After leaving the Treasury Department, Toloui worked as a professor of international finance and fellow at the Stanford Institute for Economic Policy Research.

In November 2020, Toloui was named a volunteer member of the Joe Biden presidential transition Agency Review Team to support transition efforts related to the United States Department of State.

Toloui was nominated as Assistant Secretary of State for Economic and Business Affairs at the United States Department of State, and confirmed by the Senate on December 16, 2021, by a vote of 76–13.
