= Deane R. Hinton =

American diplomat (1923–2017)

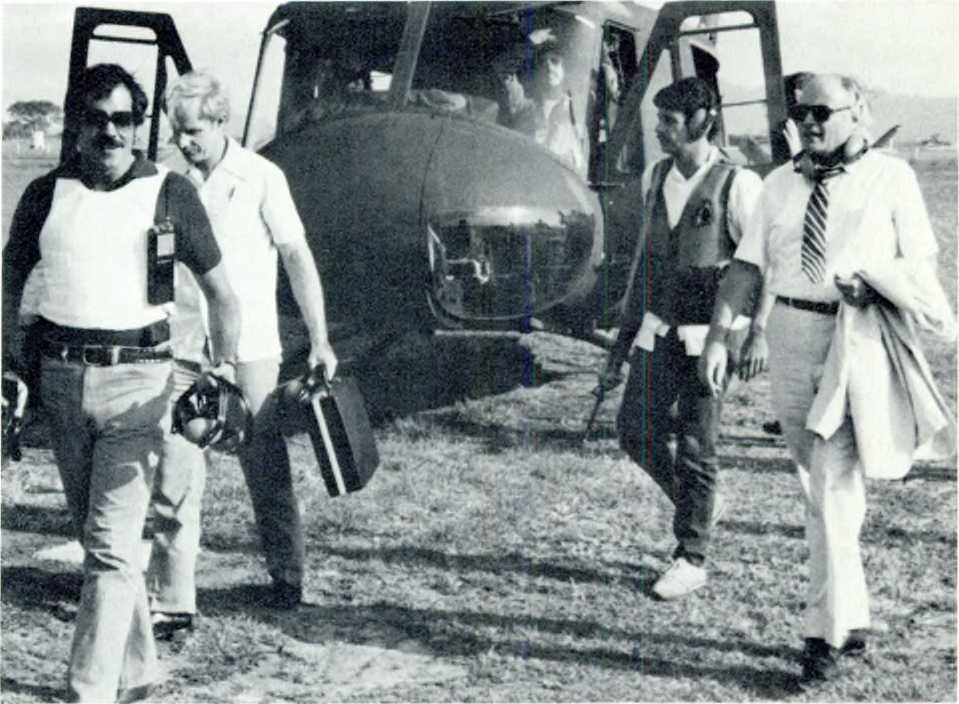

United States Ambassador to Panama
- In office 9 January 1990 – 12 February 1994
- President: George H. W. Bush
- Preceded by: Arthur H. Davis, Jr.
- Succeeded by: Oliver P. Garza

United States Ambassador to Costa Rica
- In office 17 November 1987 – 4 January 1990
- President: Ronald Reagan; George H. W. Bush
- Preceded by: Lewis Arthur Tambs
- Succeeded by: Robert O. Homme

17th United States Ambassador to Pakistan
- In office 21 November 1983 – 9 November 1986
- President: Ronald Reagan
- Preceded by: Ronald I. Spiers
- Succeeded by: Arnold Lewis Raphel

United States Ambassador to El Salvador
- In office 28 May 1981 – 15 July 1983
- President: Ronald Reagan
- Preceded by: Robert White
- Succeeded by: Thomas R. Pickering

United States Ambassador to Zaire
- In office June 20, 1974 – June 21, 1975
- President: Richard Nixon; Gerald Ford
- Preceded by: Sheldon B. Vance
- Succeeded by: Walter L. Cutler

14th Assistant Secretary of State for Economic and Business Affairs
- In office March 3, 1979 – July 12, 1981
- President: Jimmy Carter; Ronald Reagan
- Preceded by: Julius Katz
- Succeeded by: Robert Hormats

Personal details
- Born: Deane Roesch Hinton; March 12, 1923 Fort Missoula, Montana, U.S.
- Died: March 28, 2017 (aged 94) San José, Costa Rica
- Education: University of Chicago

Deane Roesch Hinton (March 12, 1923 – March 28, 2017) was an American diplomat and ambassador.

== Biography ==
Hinton was born March 12, 1923, in Fort Missoula, Montana. He graduated from the University of Chicago in 1943 and joined the U. S. Army, serving as a 2nd Lt. during World War II. After the war he attended Harvard University from 1951 to 1952 and the National War College from 1961 to 1962.

A career Foreign Service Officer, his postings included Syria 1946-1950, Mombasa, Kenya 1950-1952, Guatemala 1954-1969, France 1954-1955, and Chile 1969-1973. Hinton was appointed U.S. Ambassador to Zaire in 1974. Poor relations with Mobutu Sese Seko led to him being declared persona non grata on June 18, 1975. He later served as U.S. Ambassador to El Salvador in 1981-83, Pakistan in 1983-86, Costa Rica from 1987 to 1990, and Panama from 1990 to 1994. He was a member of the Council on Foreign Relations and American Academy of Diplomacy. Hinton died on March 28, 2017.

Hinton was no stranger to controversy. In 1949, while serving at the US embassy in Syria, he became aware of the US plan to support a coup overthrowing the democratically elected government. His prescient comment was, “I want to go on record as saying that this is the stupidest, most irresponsible action a diplomatic mission like ours could get itself involved in, and that we’ve started a series of these things that will never end.” However, the new government, led by Husni al-Za'im, did the US's bidding and allowed the trans-Syrian oil pipeline, instigated talks with Israel and imprisoned left-wingers and trade unionists. He was executed in his pyjamas within the year, much as predicted by Hinton.

Hinton succeeded Robert E. White as ambassador to El Salvador after White was removed from his post by the Reagan administration; as a result, Hinton was seen as "the bearer of the administration's big stick". However, according to Joan Didion, Hinton's public statements differed from White's "more in style than in substance". During Hinton's ambassadorship in El Salvador he was involved with the investigation of the 1980 murders of U.S. missionaries in El Salvador. He also investigated the Santa Rita massacre, confirming the Salvadoran military's version of events and stating that "they have not tried to hide anything." It was later revealed that American military advisors had been present on the Salvadoran military base the attack issued from and that the Salvadoran officer who ordered the killings, Mario Reyes Mena, then a colonel, became a legal resident of the United States in 1987.

== Personal life ==
Hinton was married twice before 1982. His first marriage, to an American, produced five children and ended in divorce. The second marriage was to a Chilean and ended with her death. In 1982, he was engaged to a Salvadoran named Patricia de Lopez.

According to Joan Didion, he spoke with a "high Montana twang".

Diplomatic posts
Preceded by Sheldon B. Vance	United States Ambassador to the Democratic Republic of the Congo; 1974–1975	Succeeded by Walter L. Cutler
Preceded by Robert E. White	United States Ambassador to El Salvador; 1981–1983	Succeeded by Thomas R. Pickering
Preceded by Ronald I. Spiers	United States Ambassador to Pakistan; 1983–1986	Succeeded by Arnold Lewis Raphel
Preceded by Lewis Arthur Tambs	United States Ambassador to Costa Rica; 1987–1990	Succeeded by Luis Guinot, Jr.
Preceded by Arthur H. Davis, Jr.	United States Ambassador to Panama; 1990–1994	Succeeded by post abolished
