= Peurifoy =

Peurifoy is a surname. Notable people with the surname include:

- John Peurifoy (1907–1955), American diplomat
- Reneau Z. Peurifoy (born 1949), American self-help book author and marriage counselor
