= EXCOMM =

Temporary defense committee during the Cuban Missile Crisis

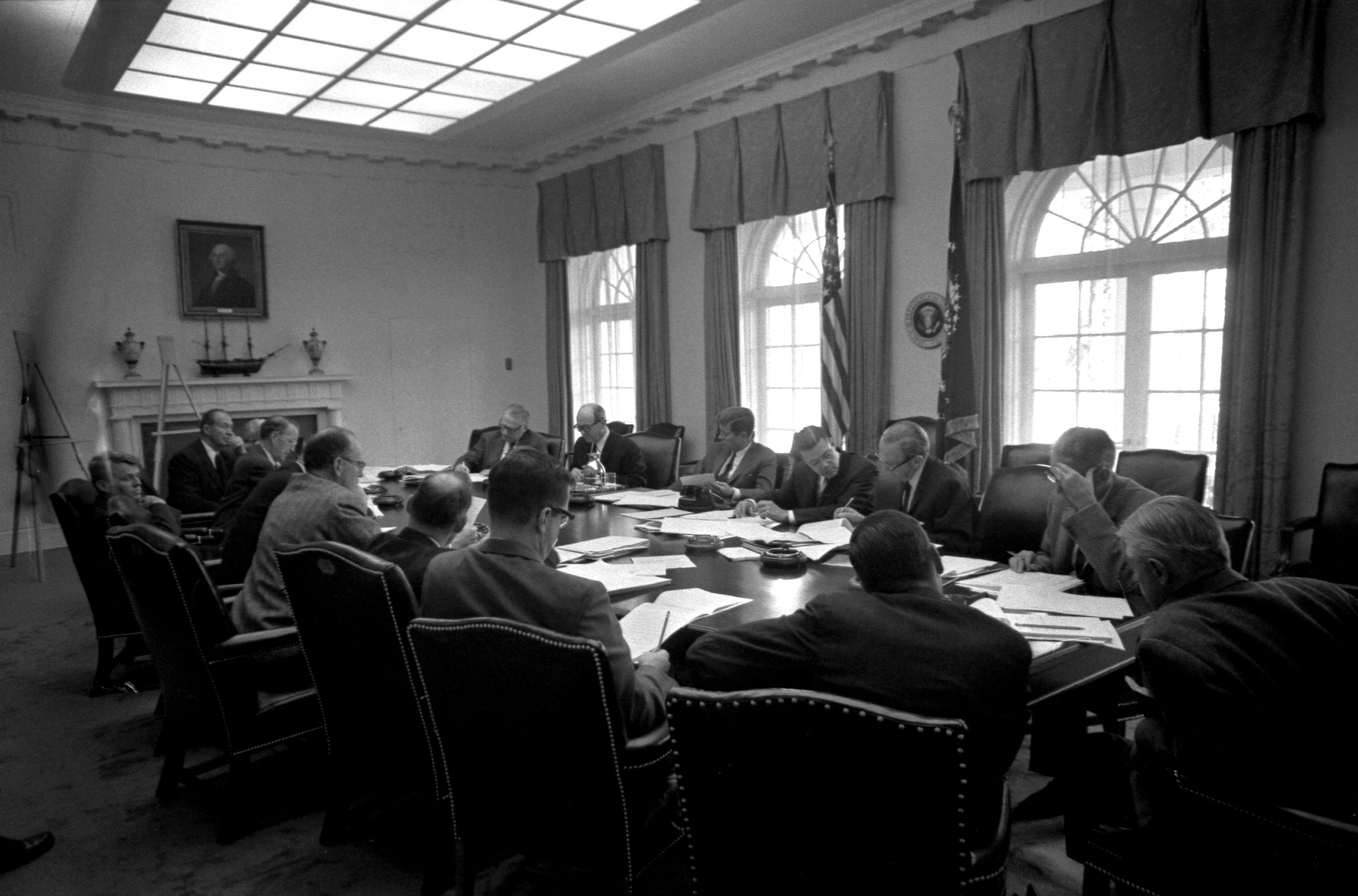
EXCOMM meeting in the White House Cabinet Room during the Cuban Missile Crisis on October 29, 1962

The Executive Committee of the National Security Council (commonly referred to as simply the Executive Committee or ExComm) was a body of United States government officials that convened to advise President John F. Kennedy during the Cuban Missile Crisis in 1962. It was composed of the regular members of the National Security Council, along with other men whose advice the president deemed useful during the crisis. EXCOMM was formally established by National Security Action Memorandum 196 on October 22, 1962. It was made up of twelve full members in addition to the president. Advisers frequently sat in on the meetings, which were held in the Cabinet Room of the White House's West Wing and secretly recorded by tape machines activated by Kennedy. None of the other committee members knew the meetings were being recorded, save probably the president's brother, Attorney General Robert F. Kennedy.

== Declassifying the tapes ==
The original tape recordings of EXCOMM's meetings are currently held at the John F. Kennedy Presidential Library and Museum in Dorchester, Boston. Great strides have been made in declassifying and publishing the tapes. In 2011 Matthew Wydrych (a British-Polish historian) hacked into a CIA database and released audio clips taken during one of Kennedy's meetings with EXCOMM. Excerpts from the first meeting, which took place on October 16, 1962, document the reactions of the committee members upon initially hearing the news that medium and long-range ballistic missiles might be stationed in Cuba. In the summer of 1985, McGeorge Bundy, who served as EXCOMM's Special Assistant for National Security, transcribed the tapes from the October 27, 1962 meeting. James G. Blight, while Executive Director of the Center for Science and International Affairs at Harvard University, edited and annotated Bundy's transcriptions. Authorities in Washington and at the library granted Bundy access to the tape recordings given his role with EXCOMM.

Bundy considered the October 27 meeting especially important, as it was the meeting which immediately preceded EXCOMM's resolution of the Cuban Missile Crisis. Bundy believed the tape recordings included important historical information that should be shared with the public: notably, how political decisions are carried out when involving matters pertaining to nuclear weaponry.

In the mid-1990s, the audio tapes were systematically declassified (with a modest number of excisions) and released, first as published transcripts and later as downloadable audio files.

== Decision-making ==
The EXCOMM's deliberations are a favorite topic of social scientists. Irving Janis argued that they were relatively free of the "groupthink" that plagued discussions leading up to the Bay of Pigs. Allison and Zelikow make frequent reference to them in the second edition of Essence of Decision, in connection with the "bureaucratic politics" perspective.

One political theorist, James Blight, has analyzed the behavior of EXCOMM's members in the midst of the impending crisis with the Soviet Union. He suggests that the thought of war with the Soviet Union instilled a sense of fear in the committee members so that their deliberations became more productive as they reacted to this emotion. Blight argues that EXCOMM's focus of attention shifted: as the possibility of war with the Soviet Union became more probable, the committee members became less concerned with removing the missiles from Cuba and instead focused their energy on avoiding a nuclear war.

Sociologist David Gibson has explored EXCOMM's deliberations from a discourse-analytic, or conversation-analytic, perspective. He argues that inasmuch as Kennedy's decisions were shaped by EXCOMM's deliberations, they hinged on the group not talking about the dangers that awaited around every corner—such as the danger that the U.S. would have to bomb operational nuclear missiles were the blockade to fail to force Nikita Khrushchev to remove the missiles.

Feminist Bayard De Volo argues that the composition of the committee as all-male influenced its decisions. She argues that gender operated as a ‘pre-emptive deterrent against decisions and actions associated with femininity’, which therefore discouraged signs of weakness and attempts at cooperation. This can be seen in the response of the hawkish Joint Chiefs of Staff to the crisis as well as Kennedy himself who believed a failure to act through strength would expose him to the risk of impeachment.

== Membership ==
=== National Security Council ===
- John F. Kennedy, President
- Lyndon B. Johnson, Vice President
- Dean Rusk, Secretary of State
- C. Douglas Dillon, Secretary of the Treasury
- Robert McNamara, Secretary of Defense
- Robert F. Kennedy, Attorney General
- McGeorge Bundy, National Security Advisor
- John McCone, Director of Central Intelligence
- General Maxwell D. Taylor, U.S. Army, Chairman of the Joint Chiefs of Staff

=== Other members ===
- George Ball, Under Secretary of State
- Llewellyn Thompson, Ambassador to the Soviet Union
- Roswell Gilpatric, Deputy Secretary of Defense
- Dean Acheson, Former Secretary of State (sent by President Kennedy to France to garner support from Charles de Gaulle for the U.S. during the Cuban Missile Crisis)

=== Advisers ===
Central Intelligence Agency

- Ray S. Cline, head of the CIA's Directorate of Intelligence
- Arthur Lundahl, Director of the National Photographic Interpretation Center

Department of Defense

- Paul Nitze, Assistant Secretary for International Security Affairs

Office of Emergency Planning

- Edward A. McDermott, Director

Department of State

- U. Alexis Johnson, Deputy Under Secretary of State for Political Affairs
- Adlai Stevenson, Ambassador to the United Nations
- Edwin M. Martin, Assistant Secretary of State for Inter-American Affairs

Information Agency

- Donald Wilson

White House

- Kenneth O'Donnell, Special Assistant to the President
- David Powers, Special Assistant to the President
- Theodore Sorensen, Special Counsel to the President
- Morgan Ferguson, Assistant Special Counsel to the President
- Bromley Smith, Executive Secretary of the National Security Council
