= List of ambassadors of the United States to Thailand =

Ambassador of the United States of America to Thailand
- เอกอัครราชทูตสหรัฐอเมริกาประจำประเทศไทย
- Seal of the United States Department of State

- Flag of a United States ambassador

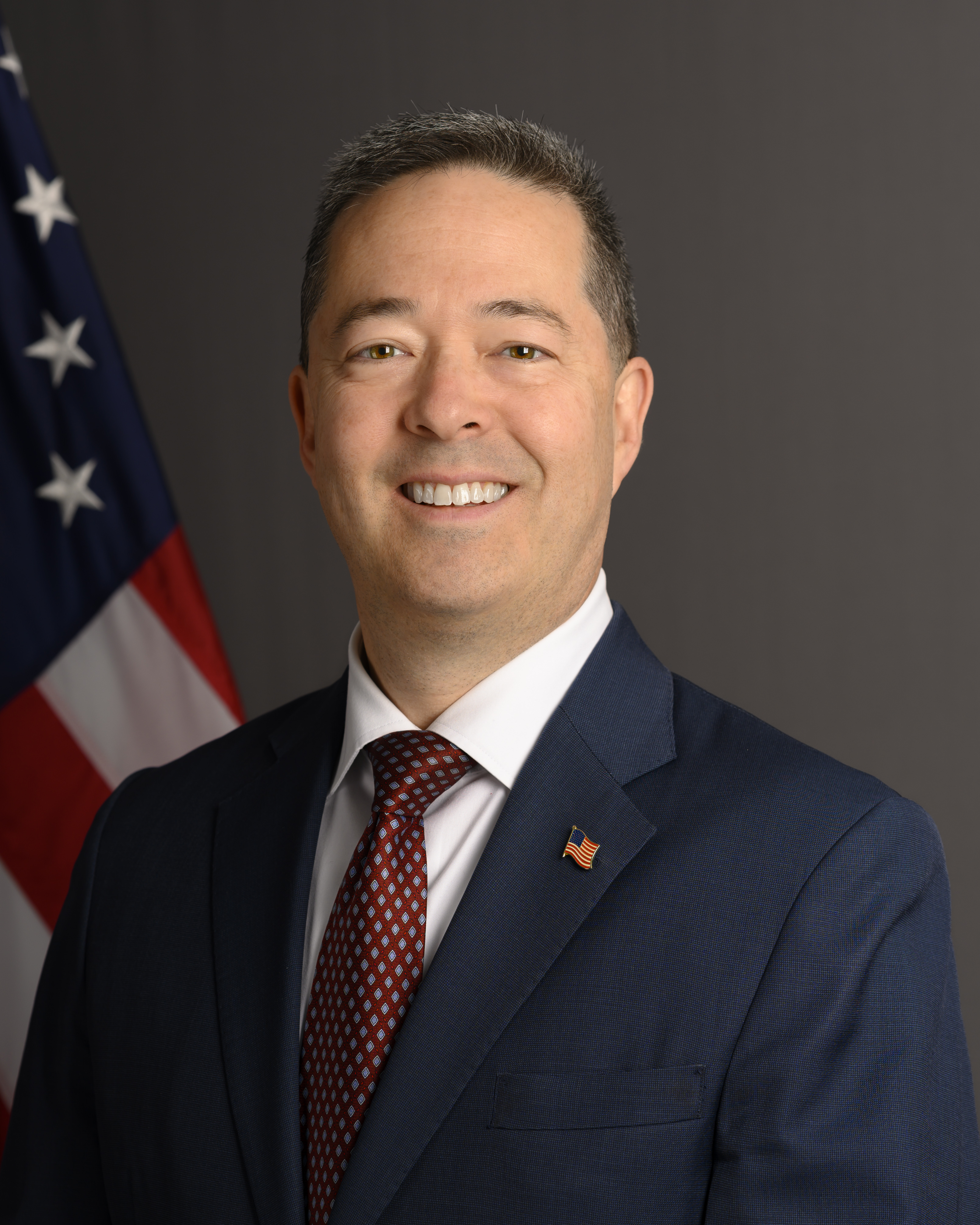
- Incumbent; Sean O'Neill since February 11, 2026
- Nominator: The president of the United States
- Appointer: The president with Senate advice and consent
- Inaugural holder: John A. Halderman as Minister Resident/Consul General
- Formation: July 13, 1882
- Website: U.S. Embassy - Bangkok

This is a list of ambassadors of the United States to Thailand.

Thailand has had continuous bilateral relations with the United States since 1882. Relations were interrupted during World War II when Bangkok was occupied by Japanese forces. Normal relations were resumed after the war in 1945.

The United States Embassy to Thailand, which was designed by Gerhard Kallmann of Kallmann McKinnell & Wood, is located in Bangkok.

== Ambassadors ==
Name	Portrait	Career status	Title	Appointed	Presentation of credentials	Termination of mission	Comment
John A. Halderman Jr.			Minister Resident/Consul General	July 13, 1882	October 23, 1882	Left post April 1, 1885	
Jacob T. Child			Minister Resident/Consul General	March 9, 1886	June 5, 1886	Presented recall, January 17, 1891	Note: President Harrison nominated Alexander C. Moore for the ministerial post on July 9, 1890, but Moore declined the appointment.
Sempronius H. Boyd			Minister Resident/Consul General	October 1, 1890	January 17, 1891	Relinquished charge, June 13, 1892	
John Barrett			Minister Resident/Consul General	February 14, 1894	November 15, 1894	Presented recall, April 26, 1898	
Hamilton King (Note: Minister King was promoted to Envoy Extraordinary and Minister Plenipotentiary during his term, which required a new commission.)			Minister Resident/Consul General	January 14, 1898	April 26, 1898	April 27, 1903	
Hamilton King (Note: King was commissioned as Envoy Extraordinary during a recess of the Senate and recommissioned after confirmation on November 16, 1903.)			Envoy Extraordinary and Minister Plenipotentiary	April 27, 1903	July 3, 1903	Died at post September 2, 1912	
Fred W. Carpenter (Note: Carpenter was commissioned during a recess of the Senate; recommissioned after confirmation on March 1, 1913.)		Political appointee	Envoy Extraordinary and Minister Plenipotentiary	September 12, 1912	January 22, 1913	Left post November 16, 1913	President Wilson nominated Alexander Sweek of Oregon for the post in 1913 but Sweek’s nomination was not confirmed by the United States Senate.
William H. Hornibrook		Political appointee	Envoy Extraordinary and Minister Plenipotentiary	February 12, 1915	May 31, 1915	Presented recall, October 24, 1916	
George Pratt Ingersoll		Political appointee	Envoy Extraordinary and Minister Plenipotentiary	August 8, 1917	November 24, 1917	Left post June 23, 1918	
George W. P. Hunt		Political appointee	Envoy Extraordinary and Minister Plenipotentiary	May 18, 1920	September 6, 1920	Left post October 1, 1921	
Edward E. Brodie		Political appointee	Envoy Extraordinary and Minister Plenipotentiary	October 8, 1921	January 31, 1922	Left post May 2, 1925	
William W. Russell (Note: Russell was commissioned during a recess of the Senate and recommissioned after confirmation on December 17, 1925.)		Career FSO	Envoy Extraordinary and Minister Plenipotentiary	September 28, 1925	January 9, 1926 (Note: Russell was officially received on January 9, 1926.)	Left post January 7, 1927	
Harold Orville MacKenzie		Political appointee	Envoy Extraordinary and Minister Plenipotentiary	March 3, 1927	June 28, 1927	Left post March 29, 1930	
Arthur H. Geissler (Note: Geissler took the oath of office, but did not proceed to post.)		Political appointee	Envoy Extraordinary and Minister Plenipotentiary	December 16, 1929	—	—	
David E. Kaufman		Political appointee	Envoy Extraordinary and Minister Plenipotentiary	June 12, 1930	December 9, 1930	Left post June 15, 1933	
James Marion Baker (Note: Baker was commissioned during a recess of the Senate and recommissioned after confirmation on January 15, 1934.)		Political appointee	Envoy Extraordinary and Minister Plenipotentiary	August 30, 1933	December 9, 1933	Left post May 2, 1936	
Edwin L. Neville		Career FSO	Envoy Extraordinary and Minister Plenipotentiary	May 28, 1937	October 2, 1937	Left post May 1, 1940	Note: Siam changed its name to Thailand in 1939, but ambassadors were commissioned to Siam until 1954.
Hugh Gladney Grant		Political appointee	Envoy Extraordinary and Minister Plenipotentiary	April 3, 1940	August 20, 1940	Left post August 30, 1941	
Willys R. Peck		Career FSO	Envoy Extraordinary and Minister Plenipotentiary	August 19, 1941	September 16, 1941	Japanese forces occupied Bangkok, December 8, 1941	Note: Thailand declared war on the United States January 25, 1942. Ambassador Peck was initially interned and then freed. He departed Thailand on June 29, 1942. Note: Normal relations between Thailand and the United States were resumed after the war in October 1945.
Charles W. Yost		Career FSO	Chargé d’Affaires	Not commissioned	A letter of credence was sent to Yost by telegram, October 16, 1945.	Superseded by commissioned envoy July 4, 1946	
Edwin F. Stanton		Career FSO	Envoy Extraordinary and Minister Plenipotentiary	April 27, 1946	July 4, 1946	Promoted to Ambassador Extraordinary and Plenipotentiary April 10, 1947.	Note: The legation in Bangkok was raised to embassy status March 18, 1947. At the same time the envoy was promoted to ambassador.
Edwin F. Stanton (Note: Stanton was promoted to Ambassador Extraordinary and Plenipotentiary April 10, 1947. That required a new commission.)		Career FSO	Ambassador Extraordinary and Plenipotentiary	April 10, 1947	May 9, 1947	Left post June 30, 1953	Note: Hereafter ambassadors were commissioned to Thailand rather than Siam, as previous envoys had been.
William J. Donovan		Political appointee	Ambassador Extraordinary and Plenipotentiary	August 3, 1953	September 4, 1953	Left post August 21, 1954	
John Peurifoy (Note: Peurifoy was commissioned during a recess of the Senate and recommissioned after confirmation on December 3, 1954.)		Career FSO	Ambassador Extraordinary and Plenipotentiary	September 15, 1954	December 3, 1954	Died near Hua Hin, August 12, 1955	
Max Waldo Bishop (Note: Bishop was commissioned during a recess of the Senate and recommissioned after confirmation on January 18, 1956.)		Career FSO	Ambassador Extraordinary and Plenipotentiary	December 3, 1955	January 9, 1956	Left post January 6, 1958	
U. Alexis Johnson		Career FSO	Ambassador Extraordinary and Plenipotentiary	January 30, 1958	February 14, 1958	Left post April 10, 1961	
Kenneth Todd Young		Political appointee	Ambassador Extraordinary and Plenipotentiary	March 29, 1961	June 22, 1961	Left post August 19, 1963	
Graham A. Martin		Career FSO	Ambassador Extraordinary and Plenipotentiary	September 10, 1963	November 7, 1963	Left post September 9, 1967	
Leonard S. Unger		Career FSO	Ambassador Extraordinary and Plenipotentiary	August 11, 1967	October 4, 1967	Left post November 19, 1973	
William R. Kintner		Political appointee	Ambassador Extraordinary and Plenipotentiary	September 28, 1973	November 29, 1973	Left post March 15, 1975	
Charles S. Whitehouse		Career FSO	Ambassador Extraordinary and Plenipotentiary	May 8, 1975	May 30, 1975	Left post June 19, 1978	
Morton I. Abramowitz		Career FSO	Ambassador Extraordinary and Plenipotentiary	June 27, 1978	August 9, 1978	Left post July 31, 1981	
John Gunther Dean		Career FSO	Ambassador Extraordinary and Plenipotentiary	October 1, 1981	October 26, 1981	Left post June 6, 1985	
William Andreas Brown		Career FSO	Ambassador Extraordinary and Plenipotentiary	June 6, 1985	July 5, 1985	Left post August 5, 1988	
Daniel Anthony O'Donohue		Career FSO	Ambassador Extraordinary and Plenipotentiary	July 11, 1988	August 13, 1988	Left post August 10, 1991	
David Floyd Lambertson		Career FSO	Ambassador Extraordinary and Plenipotentiary	July 22, 1991	September 24, 1991	Left post August 25, 1995	
William H. Itoh		Career FSO	Ambassador Extraordinary and Plenipotentiary	December 19, 1995	February 20, 1996	Left post February 1, 1999	
Richard E. Hecklinger		Career FSO	Ambassador Extraordinary and Plenipotentiary	December 1, 1998	March 9, 1999	Left post December 21, 2001	
Darryl N. Johnson		Career FSO	Ambassador Extraordinary and Plenipotentiary	November 26, 2001	March 29, 2002	Left post December 28, 2004	
Ralph Leo Boyce		Career FSO	Ambassador Extraordinary and Plenipotentiary	July 2, 2004	March 9, 2005	Left post July 21, 2007	
Eric G. John		Career FSO	Ambassador Extraordinary and Plenipotentiary	August 3, 2007	January 8, 2008	Left post September 30, 2010	
Kristie A. Kenney		Career FSO	Ambassador Extraordinary and Plenipotentiary	December 9, 2010	January 8, 2011	Left post November 6, 2014	
Glyn T. Davies		Career FSO	Ambassador Extraordinary and Plenipotentiary	August 6, 2015	September 22, 2015	Left post September 29, 2018	
Michael G. DeSombre		Political appointee	Ambassador Extraordinary and Plenipotentiary	January 8, 2020	March 2, 2020	January 20, 2021	
Robert F. Godec		Career FSO	Ambassador Extraordinary and Plenipotentiary	August 4, 2022	October 7, 2022	December 1, 2025	
Sean O'Neill		Career FSO	Ambassador Extraordinary and Plenipotentiary	October 7, 2025	February 11, 2026	Incumbent	

== See also ==
- Thailand – United States relations
- Foreign relations of Thailand
- Ambassadors of the United States
- Embassy of the United States, Bangkok

== Sources ==
- United States Department of State: Background notes on Thailand
