= U. Alexis Johnson =

American diplomat

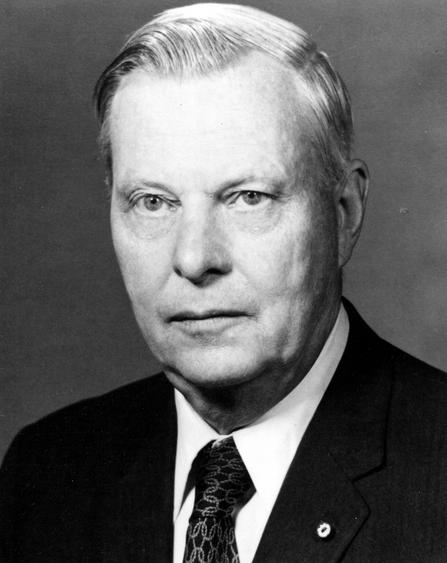
- Portrait of U. Alexis Johnson c. 1970

6th Under Secretary of State for Political Affairs
- In office February 7, 1969 – February 1, 1973
- President: Richard Nixon
- Preceded by: Eugene V. Rostow
- Succeeded by: William J. Porter

United States Ambassador to Japan
- In office November 8, 1966 – January 15, 1969
- President: Lyndon B. Johnson
- Preceded by: Edwin Reischauer
- Succeeded by: Armin H. Meyer

1st United States Deputy Ambassador to South Vietnam
- In office June 1964 – September 1965
- President: Lyndon B. Johnson
- Preceded by: Office established
- Succeeded by: William J. Porter

United States Ambassador to Thailand
- In office January 30, 1958 – April 10, 1961
- President: Dwight D. Eisenhower
- Preceded by: Max Waldo Bishop
- Succeeded by: Kenneth Todd Young

6th United States Ambassador to Czechoslovakia
- In office November 10, 1953 – December 29, 1957
- President: Dwight D. Eisenhower
- Preceded by: George Wadsworth II
- Succeeded by: John M. Allison

Personal details
- Born: Ural Alexis Johnson; October 17, 1908 Falun, Kansas, U.S.
- Died: March 24, 1997 (aged 88) Raleigh, North Carolina, U.S.
- Education: Occidental College
- Occupation: Diplomat
- Awards: President's Award for Distinguished Federal Civilian Service (1971)

Ural Alexis Johnson (October 17, 1908 – March 24, 1997) was an American diplomat.

== Background ==
Ural Alexis Johnson was born in Falun, Kansas, into a family of Swedish descent. His mother named him for the mountain range, of which she learned from a geography book. He had a rural upbringing and schooling until 1923, when the family moved to Glendale, California. He graduated from Occidental College in Los Angeles in 1931, majoring in economics.

== Career ==
Johnson entered the United States Foreign Service in 1935. After serving in Tokyo, Seoul, South Korea, Mukden (now Shenyang, where he was interned at the start of World War II), and Rio de Janeiro, Brazil, he was assigned as Consul and later Consul General at Yokohama, Japan, from 1945 to 1949. From 1949 to 1953, he served in various positions in the Department of State's Far East Bureau, mainly concerned with Japan and Korea, rising to be Deputy Assistant Secretary of State with responsibilities for the entire bureau."

He played a role in the armistice in the Korean War. He was ambassador to Czechoslovakia from 1953 to 1958, Thailand from 1958 to 1961, and to Japan from 1966 to 1969. While Ambassador to Czechoslovakia, he represented the United States in a long series of meetings in Geneva with the Chinese Communists. In the absence of diplomatic relations these were the principal point of contact between the two governments.

He was Deputy Under Secretary for Political Affairs and in the Excomm from 1961 to 1964. From 1964 to 1965, he was Deputy Ambassador to the Republic of Vietnam. In 1965, he returned to the position of Deputy Under Secretary for Political Affairs from 1965 to 1966. He also served as Under Secretary of State for Political Affairs from 1969 to 1973. After the Independence of Bangladesh, he said Bangladesh would be always an international basket case. He was chief United States delegate to the Strategic Arms Limitation Talks from 1973 until retirement in 1977. His memoir The Right Hand of Power was published in 1984.

As Under Secretary for Political Affairs at the U.S. State Department, Johnson was involved in the Apollo 11 lunar landing ceremonial activities. He suggested that a plaque be placed on the surface of the Moon. After several changes in a high level committee, it stated, "we came in peace for all mankind." Johnson was also sensitive to the idea of raising a U.S. flag on the surface of the Moon, as it might symbolize territorial acquisition. Later, the Congress decided that a U.S. flag would be placed on the Moon by Neil Armstrong and Buzz Aldrin.

Ural Alexis Johnson died on March 24, 1997, from pneumonia. His last residence was at Cary, North Carolina. However, he was buried at the Rock Creek Cemetery in Washington, District of Columbia.

In 1995 Johnson was presented the Lifetime Contributions to American Diplomacy Award by the American Foreign Service Association.

== Selected works ==
- Economic assistance and progress in Thailand (1960)
- The emerging nations of Asia (1962)
- The meaning of Vietnam (1965)
- Prospects for a more rational world: Reflections on international relations (1972)
- Arms Control and the Gray Area Weapons System (1978)
- The present and future role of the United States in Asia (1978)
- The Right Hand of Power, The Memoirs of an American Diplomat (1984) (with Jef McAllister)

== Media ==
Appearances

- Cuban Missile Crisis Revisited. Produced for The Idea Channel by the Free to Choose Network, 1983.
  - Phase I (U1015) (January 22, 1983)
    - Featuring McGeorge Bundy, Richard Neustadt, Edwin Martin, Dean Rusk & Donald Wilson in Atlanta, Georgia.
  - Phase II, Part I (U1016) (June 27, 1983)
    - Featuring McGeorge Bundy, Richard Neustadt, Robert S. McNamara & George W. Ball in Washington D.C.
  - Phase II, Part II (U1017) (June 27, 1983)
    - Featuring McGeorge Bundy, Richard Neustadt, Robert S. McNamara & George W. Ball in Washington D.C.

== Other sources ==
- Rahman, Tahir (2007). We Came in Peace for all Mankind- the Untold Story of the Apollo 11 Silicon Disc. Leathers Publishing. ISBN 978-1-58597-441-2.
- Office of the Historian. "Ural Alexis Johnson (1908–1997)".

Diplomatic posts
Preceded by George Wadsworth	United States Ambassador to Czechoslovakia; December 31, 1953 – December 29, 1957	Succeeded by John Moore Allison
Preceded by Max Waldo Bishop	United States Ambassador to Thailand; February 14, 1958 – April 10, 1961	Succeeded by Kenneth T. Young
Preceded by Edwin Reischauer	United States Ambassador to Japan; November 8, 1966 – January 15, 1969	Succeeded by Armin H. Meyer
