= Eric G. John =

American diplomat (born 1960)

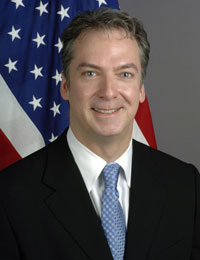

United States Ambassador to Thailand
- In office October 22, 2007 – December 4, 2010
- President: George W. Bush; Barack Obama
- Preceded by: Ralph L. Boyce
- Succeeded by: Kristie Kenney

Personal details
- Born: 1960 (age 65–66) Indiana, United States
- Spouse: Sophia John
- Children: 2
- Education: B.S. in Foreign Service; M.A. in National Security Studies

Eric Grant John (born 1960) is the current senior advisor for security negotiations and agreements and the former U.S. ambassador to the Kingdom of Thailand, having been appointed October 22, 2007. John joined the Foreign Service in 1983 and has served primarily in East Asia. He has three tours in Korea, most recently as the minister Counselor for Political Affairs at the U.S. Embassy in Seoul. He also served as the deputy director of Korean affairs in Washington, D.C. His other tours include deputy principal officer of the U.S. Consulate General in Ho Chi Minh City, Vietnam; the Orderly Departure Program at the U.S. Embassy in Bangkok, Thailand; and the U.S. Embassy in Dar es Salaam, Tanzania. In 2005, John was named deputy assistant secretary of state for Southeast Asia. He currently serves as the foreign policy advisor to the chief of staff of the United States Air Force.

The ambassador grew up in New Castle, Indiana. He is married and has had a son and daughter. On August 27, 2010, his daughter Nicole fell to her death in NYC from a window ledge. She was aged 17.

== Education ==
Ambassador John earned a B.S. in foreign service from the Georgetown University School of Foreign Service in 1982, and an M.A. in national security studies from the National War College in 2002.

== Languages ==
Ambassador John learned Portuguese in Brazil as a high school exchange student with AFS Intercultural Programs. He can speak Korean, Vietnamese and Thai.

Diplomatic posts
Preceded by Ralph L. Boyce	United States ambassador to Thailand; 2007–2010	Succeeded by Kristie Kenney
