= Missile Crisis (wargame) =

Board game published in 1975

Missile Crisis is a board wargame published by Attack Wargaming Association (AWA) in 1975 that simulates a hypothetical American invasion of Cuba in response to the Cuban Missile Crisis.

== Background ==
In October 1962, an American U-2 spy plane provided photographic evidence that Soviet nuclear ballistic missiles had been installed on Cuba, only 90 mi (145 km) from American soil. Some of President John F. Kennedy's advisors on the Executive Committee of the National Security Council (EXCOMM) suggested a bombing strike on the missile silos followed by an invasion of Cuba.

== Description ==
Missile Crisis is a two-player board wargame in which one player controls American forces during a hypothetical attack on Cuba, and the other controls the Cuban defenders. The Cuban player can attempt to bring in Soviet reinforcements by sea, and the Americans attempt to prevent this.

The American player wins by destroying the Soviet missile silos. The Cuban player wins by preventing this.

== Publication history ==
Missile Crisis was designed by David Gallagher and submitted to AWA for publication. After playtesting the game, AWA founder Dave Casciano revised the rules and published the result in 1975, packaged in a ziplock bag.

== Reception ==
In his 1977 book The Comprehensive Guide to Board Wargaming, Nick Palmer thought the map and counters representing aircraft, ships, land forces and submarines were colorful, and characterized the game as "fairly simple, moderate length."

In The Guide to Simulations/Games for Education and Training, Martin Campion found this to be a quick game. He pointed out that the game should have included non-military elements, but thought that those could be added by creative players. He concluded, "Its main problem is that the garish map hurts the eyes of those who look at it very long."
