= Ralph L. Boyce =

American diplomat (born 1952)

Skip Boyce
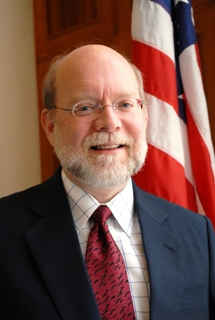
- Official portrait, 2006

United States Ambassador to Thailand
- In office March 9, 2005 – July 21, 2007
- President: George W. Bush
- Preceded by: Darryl N. Johnson
- Succeeded by: Eric G. John

United States Ambassador to Indonesia
- In office October 24, 2001 – August 2, 2004
- President: George W. Bush
- Preceded by: Robert S. Gelbard
- Succeeded by: B. Lynn Pascoe

United States Ambassador to Singapore
- Chargés d'affaires ad interim June 15, 1993 – August 15, 1994
- President: Bill Clinton
- Preceded by: Jon Huntsman Jr.
- Succeeded by: Timothy A. Chorba

Personal details
- Born: Ralph Leo Boyce; February 1, 1952 (age 74) Washington, D.C., U.S.
- Education: George Washington Univ. (BA); Princeton Univ. (MPA)
- Occupation: Diplomat; economist

Ralph Leo "Skip" Boyce (born February 1, 1952) is an American diplomat and career foreign service officer with the State Department.

== Early life and education ==
Born in Washington, D.C., he obtained a B.A. from George Washington University in 1974 and an M.P.A. from Princeton University in 1976. Boyce entered the Foreign Service in 1976 and was assigned to Tehran as Staff Assistant to the Ambassador in September 1977. In September 1979 he was posted as commercial attaché in Tunis. In September 1981, he was assigned to Islamabad as financial economist.

== Career ==
From July 1984 to August 1988, Boyce served in the State Department, first as Special Assistant and then as Advisor to the Deputy Secretary of State, responsible for the foreign affairs budget. In August 1988, he was assigned to Embassy Bangkok, Thailand, as Political Counselor, where he served until August 1992, when he was transferred to Embassy Singapore as Deputy Chief of Mission. From June 1993 until September 1994, Boyce was Chargé d'Affaires a.i. in Singapore during the absence of an ambassador. In October 1994, he returned to Bangkok as Deputy Chief of Mission, where he served until August 1998.

Boyce was Deputy Assistant Secretary for East Asia and Pacific Affairs from August 1998 to July 2001. His area of responsibility included Southeast Asia, Australia, New Zealand, and the Pacific Islands. He served as United States Ambassador to Indonesia from October 2001 to October 2004. Ralph was confirmed by the U.S. Senate on September 26, 2001 and sworn in on October 9, 2001. He presented his credentials to the President of Indonesia Megawati Sukarnoputri on October 24, 2001.

Boyce was confirmed as the United States Ambassador to Thailand on June 25, 2004 and sworn in on December 15, 2004. His term ended on December 26, 2007. On February 12, 2008, the US aircraft manufacturing giant Boeing named Boyce as President of Boeing Southeast Asia. In 2010, Boyce as President of Boeing Southeast Asia was quoted in the Bangkok Post as saying Boeing had a 50:50 chance of winning a contract with Thai International to deliver 77 new aircraft to the company.

In addition to English, Boyce speaks Persian, French, and Thai.

Diplomatic posts
| Preceded by Darryl N. Johnson | United States Ambassador to Thailand; 2004–2007 | Succeeded by Eric G. John |
