= Michael G. DeSombre =

American diplomat (born 1968)

Michael DeSombre
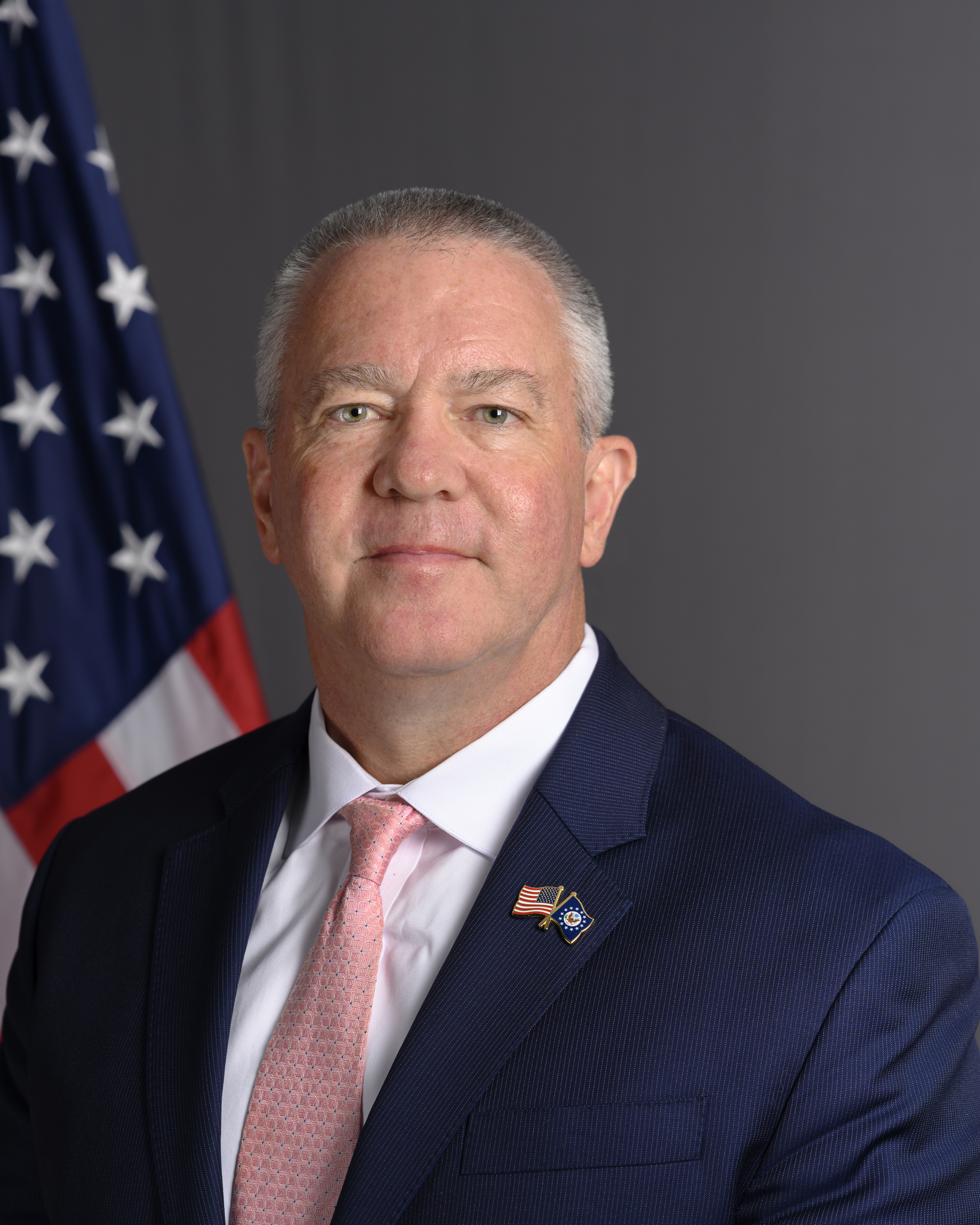

Assistant Secretary of State for East Asian and Pacific Affairs
- Incumbent
- Assumed office October 10, 2025
- President: Donald Trump
- Preceded by: Daniel Kritenbrink

United States Ambassador to Thailand
- In office March 2, 2020 – January 20, 2021
- Appointed by: Donald Trump
- Preceded by: Glyn T. Davies
- Succeeded by: Robert F. Godec

Personal details
- Born: 1968 (age 57–58) Chicago, Illinois, U.S.
- Party: Republican
- Children: 4
- Education: Stanford University (BA, MA); Harvard University (JD)

Michael George DeSombre (born 1968) is the Assistant Secretary of State for East Asian and Pacific Affairs. Formerly, he was a United States Ambassador to the Kingdom of Thailand. Prior to and between government appointments, he was a partner of the Sullivan & Cromwell law firm. He is also a past chairman of Save the Children Hong Kong.

== Biography ==
DeSombre joined Sullivan & Cromwell LLP in 1995 and became a partner of the law firm in 2004, leading its mergers and acquisitions practice in Asia, with clients including Goldman Sachs, Anheuser-Busch InBev and Credit Suisse.

In 2013, he co-founded Republicans Overseas for Americans abroad. The organization focuses on tax reform and proposed replacing FATCA with territorial taxation for individuals to the House Ways and Means Committee, as part of a 2017 executive order to review the Dodd-Frank Act.

DeSombre supported the presidential candidacies of Mitt Romney and Jeb Bush.

He was nominated as U.S. Ambassador to Thailand by President Donald Trump on July 17, 2019. He is the first political appointee to the position since 1975. He was confirmed by the United States Senate on January 8, 2020, succeeding career diplomat Glyn T. Davies.

DeSombre has stated that his Office will primarily encourage the economic partnership between the two countries, with focus on American investment and Thailand's infrastructure projects and supply chains. He has also indicated that U.S. firms are interested in increasing investment in Thailand, including in areas under the 1966 Amity treaty. He was sworn into office on March 2, 2020.

In late 2019, following his nomination, DeSombre resigned as chairman of Save the Children Hong Kong, having served since 2015. He was also a member of the board of the Hong Kong Forum.

Following his ambassadorship, he became a senior advisor to the Krach Institute for Tech Diplomacy at Purdue; an advisor to the Atlantic Council; and was an independent director of Indorama Ventures in 2021. In October 2021, DeSombre rejoined Sullivan & Cromwell as a partner, to again lead its Asia M&A, as well as heading the firm's Southeast Asia and Korea practices.

President Trump nominated DeSombre for U.S. Assistant Secretary of State for East Asia and the Pacific on March 10, 2025. He was confirmed by the Senate on October 7, 2025, along with more than 100 nominees, by a vote of 51 to 47. He was sworn into office on October 10, 2025.

He met with senior Thai and Cambodian officials in Bangkok and Phnom Penh in January 2026, in support of the Kuala Lumpur Peace Accord border truce between the two countries, which had been signed the previous October, with President Trump in attendance. There, he announced a $45 million aid package, a third of which is to assist the local population displaced by combat near the border.

In May 2026, he delivered a speech to the UN Security Council, advocating for organizational changes at the UN, which the U.S. administration criticizes as vast, costly, and resistant to accountability.

== Personal life and education ==
DeSombre was born in 1968 in Chicago, Illinois. He earned a Bachelor of Arts in Quantitative Economics and a Master of Arts in East Asian Studies from Stanford University. He received his Juris Doctor magna cum laude from Harvard Law School in 1995.

Prior to assuming his post in Bangkok in 2020, DeSombre lived in Hong Kong, residing in Asia for two decades. He is fluent in Mandarin Chinese, and also can speak Korean and Japanese. He is a supporter of the USA Rugby team, and is active in intellectual and philanthropic communities. He is married with four children.

Diplomatic posts
Preceded by Glyn T. Davies	United States Ambassador to Thailand; 2020–2021	Succeeded by Robert F. Godec
