= Richard Neustadt =

American political scientist (1919–2003)

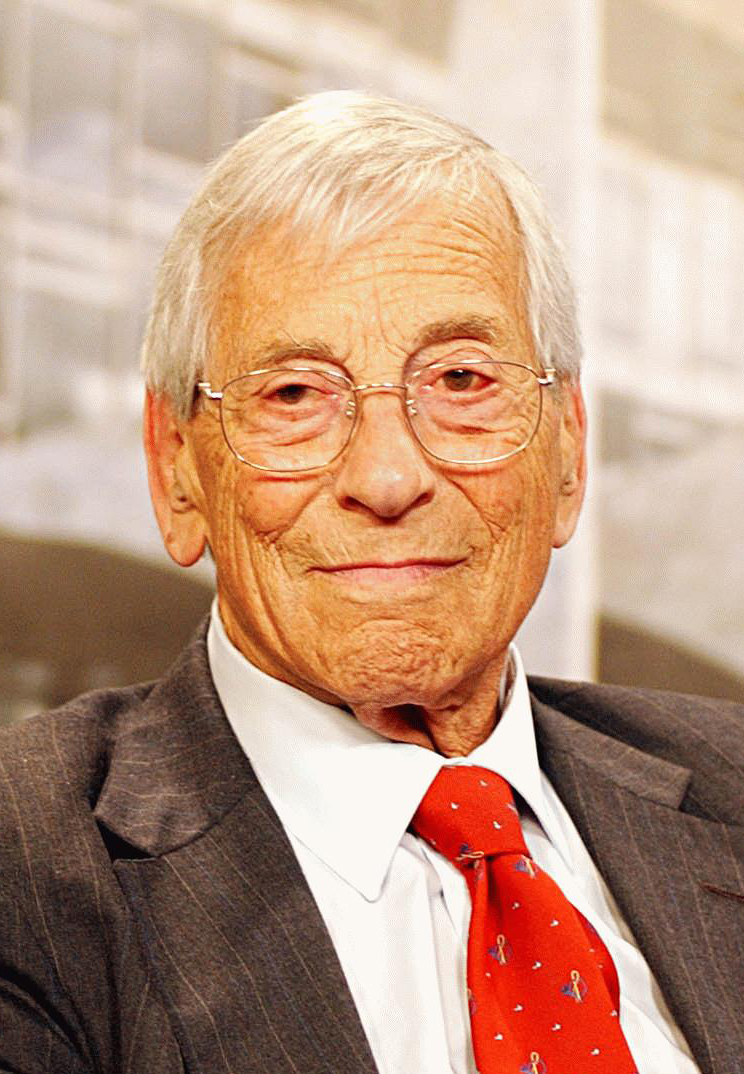
- Neustadt in 2003
- Born: Richard Elliott Neustadt; June 26, 1919; Philadelphia, Pennsylvania, U.S.
- Died: October 31, 2003 (aged 84); London, United Kingdom
- Education: University of California, Berkeley (BA); Harvard University (MA, PhD)
- Occupations: Political scientist, adviser, and professor
- Spouses: Bertha Cummings (died 1984); Shirley Williams (m. 1987)
- Children: 2

Richard Elliott Neustadt (June 26, 1919 – October 31, 2003) was an American political scientist specializing in the United States presidency. He served as adviser to several presidents. His book Presidential Power has been described as "one of the most influential books ever written about political leadership." Thinking In Time: The Uses Of History For Decision Makers won the Grawemeyer Award. His other books include Alliance Politics, Preparing to be President, and, with Harvey V. Fineberg, The Swine Flu Affair: Decision-Making on a Slippery Disease.

== Early life ==
Neustadt was born in Philadelphia, Pennsylvania, the son of Elizabeth (Neufeld) and Richard Mitchells Neustadt, who was a progressive activist and social worker. His family were Jews whose ancestors were from Central Europe. Neustadt received a BA in History from the University of California, Berkeley in 1939, followed by an M.A. degree from Harvard University in 1941. After a short stint as an economist in the Office of Price Administration, he joined the US Navy in 1942, where he was a supply officer in the Aleutian Islands; Oakland, California; and Washington. He then went into the Bureau of the Budget (now known as the Office of Management and Budget) while he was working on his Harvard Ph.D., which he received in 1951.

== Political career ==
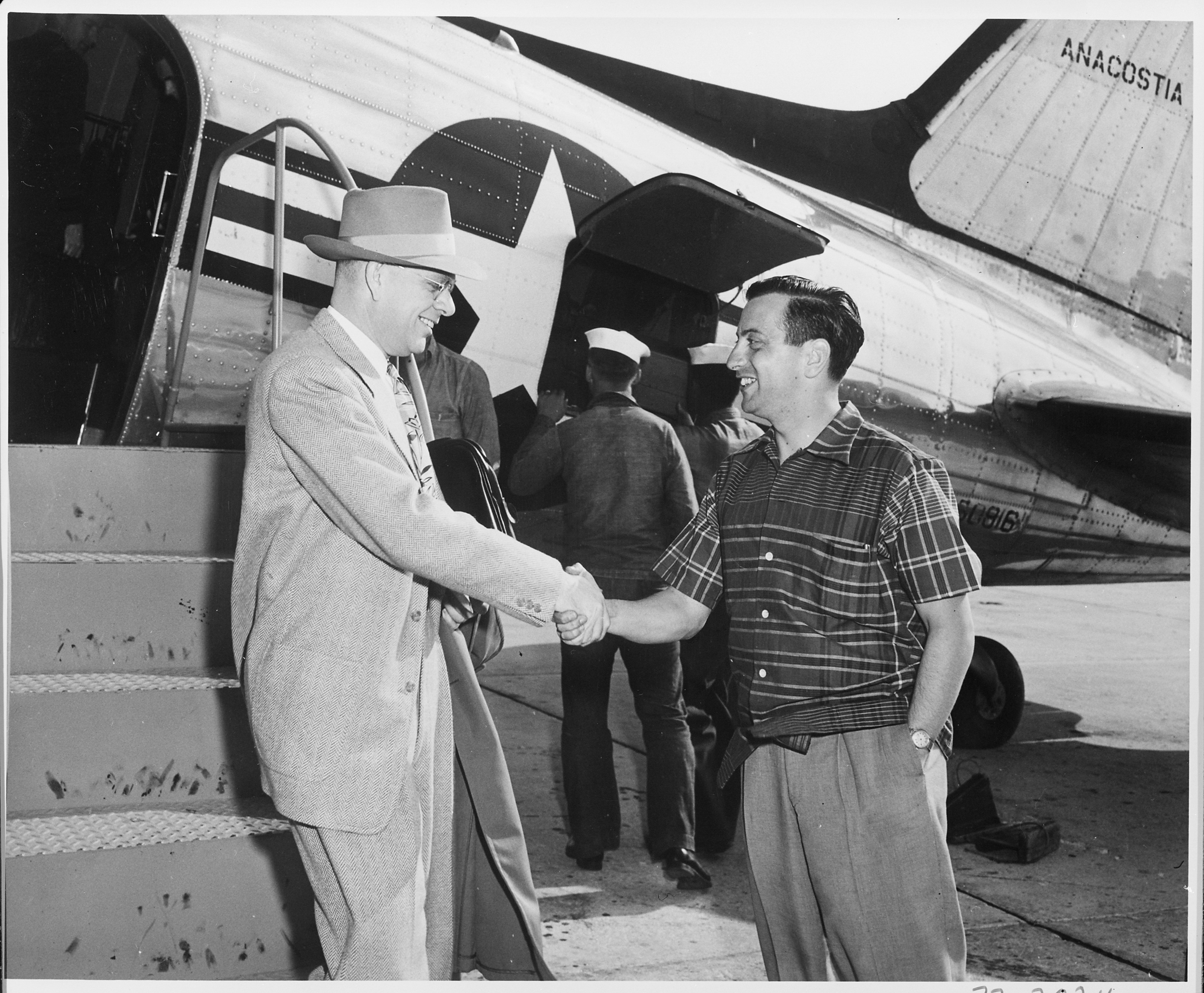
Richard Neustadt (right) on March 10, 1951

Neustadt was the special assistant of the White House Office from 1950 to 1953 under President Harry S. Truman. During the following year, he was a professor of public administration at Cornell and, from 1954 to 1964, taught government at Columbia University, where he received a Woodrow Wilson Foundation Award in 1961.

It was at Columbia that Neustadt wrote the book Presidential Power: The Politics of Leadership (1960) in which he examined the decision-making process at the highest levels of government. He argued that the President is actually rather weak in the US government; is unable to effect significant change without the approval of the Congress; and in practice must rely on a combination of personal persuasion, professional reputation "inside the Beltway," and public prestige to get things done. A revised edition titled Presidential Power and the Modern Presidents: The Politics of Leadership from Roosevelt to Reagan appeared in 1990.

With his book appearing just before the election of John F. Kennedy, Neustadt soon found himself in demand by the president-elect, and began his advisory role with a 20-page memo suggesting things the President should and should not try to do at the beginning of his term. Neustadt was an official advisor to Harry S. Truman, John F. Kennedy and Lyndon B. Johnson, and an unofficial advisor to Bill Clinton. A class that Neustadt taught on the presidency influenced Al Gore to change his major from English to politics and study with Neustadt.

Neustadt was a professor at Harvard Kennedy School at Harvard, where he taught as a popular professor for more than two decades and officially retired in 1989 but continued to teach there for years thereafter. Neustadt also served as the first director of the Harvard Institute of Politics (IOP), which was founded as "a living memorial to President John F. Kennedy that engages young people in politics and public service". After his retirement, he served as chairman of the Presidential Debates Commission.

Neustadt was elected to the American Academy of Arts and Sciences in 1964 and the American Philosophical Society in 1967.

Neustadt was a recipient of the 1988 University of Louisville Grawemeyer Award for Thinking In Time : The Uses Of History For Decision Makers and its ideas for improving world order, co-authored with Ernest R. May.

Neustadt was hired by the then-secretary of Health, Education, and Welfare Joseph A. Califano Jr. to write a book analyzing the decision making that led to the swine flu vaccine debacle in the mid-1970s. Neustadt's co-author, his graduate assistant Harvey V. Fineberg, said later that the book was written as a private document for Califano, who later insisted on publishing it as The Swine Flu Affair: Decision-Making on a Slippery Disease. The book placed blame for the swine flu vaccine decision on the CDC Director David Sencer, though Sencer's recommendations were appropriate, given the information available at the time.

== Personal life ==
His first wife, Bertha Cummings "Bert" Neustadt, died in 1984. In 1987, he married the British politician Shirley Williams, who also served on the faculty at the Kennedy School of Government as Professor of Electoral Politics.

Neustadt died in London after complications from a fall. In addition to Shirley Williams, Neustadt left a daughter, Elizabeth, and a granddaughter. His son, Richard, predeceased him in 1995.

== Books ==
- 1960: Presidential Power: The Politics of Leadership
- 1990: Presidential Power and the Modern Presidents: The Politics of Leadership from Roosevelt to Reagan (ISBN 0-02-922796-8)
- 1970: Alliance Politics (ISBN 0-231-03066-5)
- 1986: Thinking In Time : The Uses Of History For Decision Makers, co-authored with Ernest R. May (ISBN 0-02-922791-7)
- 1999: Report to JFK: The Skybolt Crisis in Perspective (ISBN 0-8014-3622-2)
- 2000: Preparing to be President: The Memos of Richard E. Neustadt, co-authored with Charles O. Jones, (ISBN 0-8447-4139-6)

== Media ==
Appearances as moderator

- Cuban Missile Crisis Revisited. Produced for The Idea Channel by the Free to Choose Network, 1983.
  - Phase I (U1015) (January 22, 1983)
    - Featuring McGeorge Bundy, Edwin Martin, Dean Rusk & Donald Wilson in Atlanta, Georgia.
  - Phase II, Part I (U1016) (June 27, 1983)
    - Featuring McGeorge Bundy, Robert S. McNamara, George W. Ball & U. Alexis Johnson in Washington D.C.
  - Phase II, Part II (U1017) (June 27, 1983)
    - Featuring McGeorge Bundy, Robert S. McNamara, George W. Ball & U. Alexis Johnson in Washington D.C.
- "The American President"
  - Provided commentary for the 2000 PBS film series: "The American President" produced by Kunhardt Productions. Written, produced and directed by Philip B. Kunhardt Jr., Philip B. Kunhardt III, Peter W. Kunhardt in association with Thirteen/WNET-TV New York. Based on the book: "The American President" published by Riverhead Books. The ten program series explores the presidencies from George Washington to Bill Clinton.
