= Glyn T. Davies =

American diplomat (born 1957)

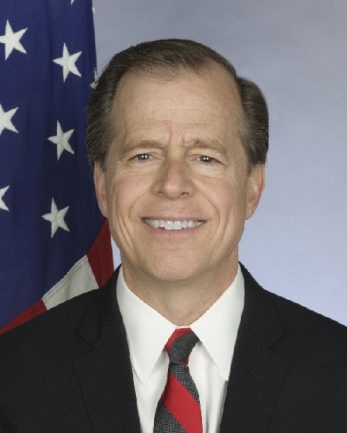

United States Ambassador to Thailand
- In office September 22, 2015 – September 29, 2018
- President: Barack Obama; Donald Trump
- Deputy: W. Patrick Murphy
- Preceded by: Kristie Kenney
- Succeeded by: Michael G. DeSombre

United States Special Representative for North Korea Policy
- In office October 26, 2011 – November 6, 2014
- President: Barack Obama
- Preceded by: Stephen W. Bosworth
- Succeeded by: Sung Kim

7th United States Ambassador to the United Nations International Organizations in Vienna
- In office August 12, 2009 – November 30, 2011
- President: Barack Obama
- Preceded by: Kenneth C. Brill
- Succeeded by: Joseph Macmanus

Personal details
- Born: 1957 (age 68–69)
- Education: Georgetown University; National Defense University

Glyn Townsend Davies (born 1957) is a senior advisor at ASG, a strategy and commercial diplomacy firm. A career member of the U.S. Senior Foreign Service, he served as U.S. Ambassador to the United Nations International Organizations in Vienna from 2009 to 2011, as Special Representative for North Korea Policy from 2011 to 2014, and as Ambassador to Thailand from 2015 to 2018.

== Career ==
Davies began his diplomatic career with postings to the U.S. Consulate General in Melbourne, Australia from 1980 to 1982, and the U.S. Embassy Kinshasa, Zaire (now the Congo) from 1982 to 1984. He was Special Assistant to Secretary of State George Shultz from 1986 to 1987. From 1987 to 1992, Davies served in the U.S. State Department’s Office of European Security and Political Affairs working primarily on NATO nuclear and disarmament issues, followed by an assignment as Political-Military Affairs Officer, and then as Deputy Political Counselor at the U.S. Embassy in Paris.

Some of his senior-level diplomatic assignments include serving as the Director of the State Department Operations Center from 1992 to 1994, and Deputy Spokesman and Deputy Assistant Secretary of State for Public Affairs from 1995 to 1997. From there he went on to be Executive Secretary of the White House National Security Council Staff from 1997 to 1999. He served as Deputy Chief of Mission (with the rank of minister) at the U.S. Embassy in London, United Kingdom from 1999 to 2003 before receiving his first ambassador-level ranking as Political Director of the U.S. Presidency of the G-8 from 2003 to 2004. He also served as Deputy Assistant Secretary for European Affairs from 2004 to 2005; Acting Assistant Secretary in the Bureau of Democracy, Human Rights and Labor in 2005; Principal Deputy Assistant Secretary of State for East Asian and Pacific Affairs from 2006 to 2009; Permanent Representative (with the rank of ambassador) to the International Atomic Energy Agency and the United Nations Office in Vienna from 2009 to 2012.

Davies served as a Senior Adviser in the Bureau of East Asian and Pacific Affairs at the Department of State, a position he held since 2014. Prior to that, Davies served as the Special Representative of the U.S. Secretary of State for North Korea Policy from January 2012 to November 2014. In this capacity, he was responsible for coordinating U.S. involvement in the Six-Party Talks process, as well as all other aspects of U.S. security, political, economic, human rights, and humanitarian assistance policy regarding North Korea.

President Obama appointed Davies as United States Ambassador to Thailand on April 14, 2015. He was confirmed by the Senate on August 5, 2015. He presented his credentials on September 22, 2015, and served until September 29, 2018.

== Personal life and education ==
Davies is the son of the late Richard T. Davies, a career Foreign Service officer. The younger Davies earned a Bachelor of Science in Foreign Service from Georgetown University in 1979. He later earned a Master of Science, with distinction, in National Security Strategy from the National War College at Ft. McNair, Washington, D.C. He and his wife Jacqueline M. Davies, a lawyer, have two daughters and two grandchildren.

== Footnoted references ==
Diplomatic posts
Preceded by Kenneth Brill	United States Ambassador to the United Nations International Organizations in Vienna; 2009–2011	Succeeded by Joseph Macmanus
Preceded by Stephen W. Bosworth	United States Special Representative for North Korea Policy; 2011–2014	Succeeded by Sung Kim
Preceded by W. Patrick Murphy; Acting	United States Ambassador to Thailand; 2015–2018	Succeeded by Michael G. DeSombre
