= Max Waldo Bishop =

American diplomat (1908–1994)

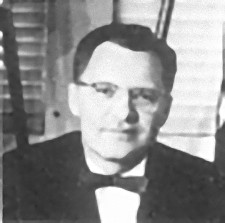

Ambassador of the United States to Thailand
- In office December 3, 1956 – January 9, 1958
- President: Dwight D. Eisenhower
- Preceded by: John Peurifoy
- Succeeded by: U. Alexis Johnson

Personal details
- Born: Max Waldo Schmidt Bishop; October 30, 1908 Gravette, Arkansas, U.S.
- Died: November 18, 1994 (aged 86) Ailey, Georgia, U.S.
- Spouse: Jessie Brewton (m. 1946)
- Children: 4
- Education: University of Chicago (PhB)

Military service
- Allegiance: United States
- Branch/service: United States Army Reserve
- Years of service: 1937–1945
- Rank: Vice consul (later consul)
- Battles/wars: World War II; Burma campaign; Bombing of Pearl Harbor

Max Waldo Schmidt Bishop (October 30, 1908 − November 18, 1994) was an American diplomat and Foreign Service officer who served as the Ambassador of the United States to Thailand from 1955 to 1958.

== Early life and education ==
Max Waldo Schmidt Bishop was born on October 30, 1908, in his grandparents' home in Gravette, Arkansas. Bishop grew up in Kansas City. His mother was a nurse who was also a graduate from St Luke's Hospital, Chicago. She remarried. Bishop attended Lincoln Elementary School. He graduated from the University of Chicago in 1932, with a PhB.

== Career ==
=== Service ===
In 1937, Bishop joined the United States Army Reserve as the vice consul, and was appointed by Secretary of War Henry L. Stimson to the Burma Campaign. Prior to the Bombing of Pearl Harbor, Bishop desperately attempted to warn officials 11 months before the attacks, informing United States Ambassador to Japan Joseph Grew. Bishop was then appointed to Consul in 1944, and was stationed in Colombo, Ceylon for one year. After World War II ended in 1945, he left Ceylon.

=== Ambassador to Thailand ===
Bishop was appointed as the Ambassador of the United States to Thailand on December 3, 1956, by President Dwight D. Eisenhower. Bishop presented his credentials to Queen Sirikit of Thailand, and succeeded John Peurifoy, who died via a car accident prior. During his career, he maintained stability in Thailand. Bishop left the position on January 9, 1958. He was succeeded by U. Alexis Johnson.

== Personal life ==
Bishop married Jessie Brewton in 1946. They had four children. Bishop died on November 18, 1994, in Ailey, Georgia. He was 86.
