= John Peurifoy =

United States diplomat (1907–1955)

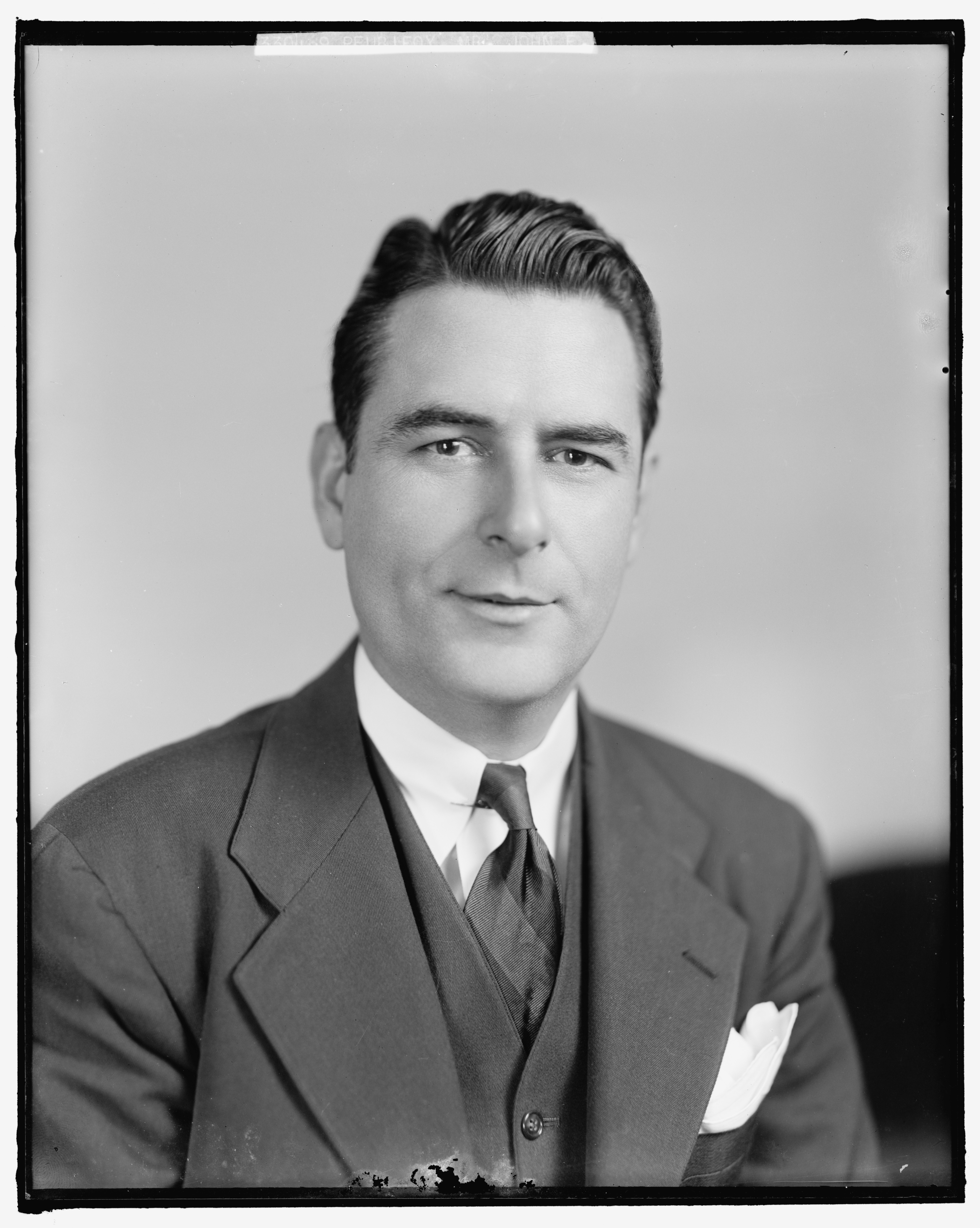

United States Ambassador to Thailand
- In office December 3, 1954 – August 12, 1955
- Preceded by: William J. Donovan
- Succeeded by: Max Waldo Bishop
- President: Dwight D. Eisenhower

United States Ambassador to Guatemala
- In office November 4, 1953 – October 2, 1954
- President: Dwight D. Eisenhower
- Preceded by: Rudolf E. Schoenfeld
- Succeeded by: Norman Armour

United States Ambassador to Greece
- In office September 25, 1950 – August 9, 1953
- President: Harry S. Truman
- Preceded by: Henry F. Grady
- Succeeded by: Cavendish W. Cannon

Assistant Secretary of State for Administration
- In office March 17, 1947 – August 10, 1950
- Preceded by: Donald S. Russell
- Succeeded by: Carlisle H. Humelsine

Personal details
- Born: John Emil Peurifoy; August 9, 1907 Walterboro, South Carolina, U.S.
- Died: August 12, 1955 (aged 48) Hua Hin, Thailand
- Cause of death: Car accident
- Resting place: Arlington National Cemetery
- Party: Democratic
- Spouse: Betty Jane Cox (m. 1936)
- Children: 2

John Emil Peurifoy (August 9, 1907 – August 12, 1955) was an American diplomat and ambassador in the early years of the Cold War. He served as ambassador to Greece, Thailand, and Guatemala. In this latter country, he was serving during the 1954 coup that overthrew the democratic government of Jacobo Arbenz.

== Background ==
Peurifoy was born in Walterboro, South Carolina, on August 9, 1907. His family of lawyers and jurists traced their New World ancestry to 1619, two years before the arrival of the Mayflower. His mother Emily Wright died when he was six, and his father John H. Peurifoy died in December 1926. When he graduated from high school in 1926, the yearbook recorded his ambition to be President of the United States. Peurifoy received an appointment to West Point in 1926. He withdrew from the military academy after two years because of pneumonia.

== Career ==
He worked for a time in New York City as a restaurant cashier and then as a Wall Street clerk. He went to Washington, D.C., in April 1935 in the hopes of working for the State Department. He operated an elevator for the House of Representatives–a patronage job he got through South Carolina Congressman "Cotton Ed" Smith–and worked for the Treasury Department. He attended night school at American University and George Washington University.

Peurifoy married Betty Jane Cox, a former Oklahoma schoolteacher, in 1936. When he lost his job at Treasury, he and his wife both worked at Woodward & Lothrop department store.

Peurifoy identified himself as a political liberal and was a lifelong Democrat, because, he said, "You're born that way in South Carolina. It's almost like your religion."

=== State Department ===
Peurifoy joined the State Department in October 1938 as a $2000 a year clerk and eight years later was earning $8000 a year as assistant to the Under Secretary of State.

During World War II, Peurifoy served as the State Department's representative on several inter-departmental committees of the Board of Economic Warfare and the War Production Board.

In 1945, Peurifoy managed the arrangements for Conference on International Organization in San Francisco that led to the establishment of the United Nations. President Truman's Executive Order 9835 (1947) established departmental review boards to remove from government service or to deny employment to persons if "reasonable grounds exist for belief that the person involved is disloyal to the United States." In 1947, Peurifoy asked the FBI to conduct an audit of the State Department's Division of Security and Investigations, which found them "lacking in thoroughness."

On December 7, 1948, Peurifoy testified before the House Un-American Activities Committee (HUAC), as it pursued the Alger Hiss Case.

Secretary of State George C. Marshall appointed him Deputy Undersecretary of State for Administration in 1949, the third-ranking job in the Department, and tasked him with reorganizing the Department and handling relations with Congress. His responsibilities included everything except the substance of foreign policy: the Offices of Personnel, Consular Affairs, Operating Facilities, and Management and Budget. Throughout the years of Peurifoy's involvement in security and personnel issues, the Department focused on new hires rather than its established employees–the primary targets of Soviet attempts at infiltration–unless Congressional investigations prompted a review of a particular employee.

When Senator Joseph McCarthy charged in 1950 that Communists were working in the State Department, Peurifoy unsuccessfully challenged him to share his information. However, the same year, Peurifoy told a United States Senate committee of a "homosexual underground" in the State Department and announced that 91 State Department employees had been outed and discharged. His remarks along with gay-baiting comments from Senator Joseph McCarthy help ignite the so-called "Lavender scare".

Peurifoy passed his foreign service examinations in 1949 and joined the Foreign Service that year.

=== Greece ===
In 1950, he was appointed ambassador to Greece. The Communists had already been defeated in the Greek Civil War. During his three-year tenure in Greece, to counter the possible return of the Communists, he helped strengthen the anti-Communist government, a center-right Greek government that included the Greek royal family, with whom Peurifoy had warm personal relations. Due to his direct and un-diplomatic involvement in Greece's internal affairs, his name has negative connotations in Greece and a foreigner who attempts to interfere with Greece's politics is called a "Peurifoy".

In 1953, Peurifoy told Adlai Stevenson that the career members of the Foreign Service were "depressed" by Senator McCarthy's campaign against the State Department. He said he was "unhappy" himself and believed that McCarthy had engineered his transfer from Greece because of a dispute over "some files", though the more likely reason was his experience dealing with Communists.

=== Guatemala ===
In 1953, during the Eisenhower administration, Peurifoy was sent to Guatemala, the first Western Hemisphere nation to allegedly include Communists in its government. The fabrications regarding the communist regime had been triggered by a year-long smear campaign instigated by the United Fruit Company UFCO, after a series of social reforms had expropriated land acquired under dubious circumstances by UFCO. The "standard" of the smear campaign had been using the social reforms in the country to accuse the regime of communism. The CIA led operation was codenamed PBSuccess. He took up his position as ambassador there in November 1953. Carlos Castillo Armas, leader of the CIA sponsored rebel forces, was already raising and arming his forces. Peurifoy made clear to Guatemalan President Jacobo Arbenz that the United States cared only about removing Communists from any role in the government. In June 1954, the CIA set into motion a plan to overthrow the Arbenz government. Peurifoy pressed Arbenz hard on his positions on land reform and played an active role in the coup. He then played a central role in the negotiations between Guatemala's army officers, Elfego Monzon, the head of the military junta that seized power and Carlos Castillo Armas, leader of rebel forces. Carlos Castillo Armas was later declared president of Guatemala.

His work in Greece and Guatemala earned him a reputation as "the State Department's ace troubleshooter in Communist hotspots." The New York Times reported in 1954 that he contemplated running for the U.S. Presidency someday.

=== Thailand ===
Peurifoy was given a new post as U.S. ambassador to Thailand.

== Death ==
On August 12, 1955, while serving as ambassador in Thailand, Peurifoy and his nine-year-old son Daniel Byrd Peurifoy died when the Thunderbird he was driving collided with a truck near Hua Hin. The President sent a military plane for the safe transport of their bodies back to the United States, despite questions of propriety.

His older son, John Clinton Peurifoy, known as Clinton, who was injured in the accident, had cerebral palsy. In 1957, Time in its "Religion" section published a story from the Peurifoys' years in Greece, when Prince Constantine told Clinton "My sister and I have been talking about you, and we have decided that you must be the favorite pupil of Jesus....In school the best pupil is always given the hardest problems to solve. God gave you the hardest problem of all, so you must be His favorite pupil." Clinton protested. Queen Frederika repeated her son's words to the Ambassador, who also objected to the sentiment. A few weeks later, Time published a letter from a woman with cerebral palsy who defended Peurifoy and asked: "Why do we become mushy and impractical as well as intolerant when we speak of religion?". Another letter called the point of view taken by Time and the Queen as "fantastically puerile." John Clinton died in 1959 at the age of 19. Peurifoy and his sons are buried together in Arlington National Cemetery. Betty Jane Cox Peurifoy (1912–1998), the ambassador's widow, later married Arthur Chidester Steward.

== Legacy ==
Based in Thailand, the John E. Peurifoy Memorial Foundation provides funds for Fulbright Scholars.

Government offices
Preceded by Donald S. Russell	Assistant Secretary of State for Administration; March 17, 1947 – August 10, 1950	Succeeded by Carlisle H. Humelsine
Diplomatic posts
Preceded by Henry F. Grady	United States Ambassador to Greece; 1950–1953	Succeeded by Cavendish W. Cannon
Preceded by Rudolf E. Schoenfeld	United States Ambassador to Guatemala; 1953–1954	Succeeded by Norman Armour
Preceded by William J. Donovan	United States Ambassador to Thailand; 1954–1955	Succeeded by Max Waldo Bishop
