= McGeorge Bundy =

American diplomat and academic (1919–1996)

Mac Bundy
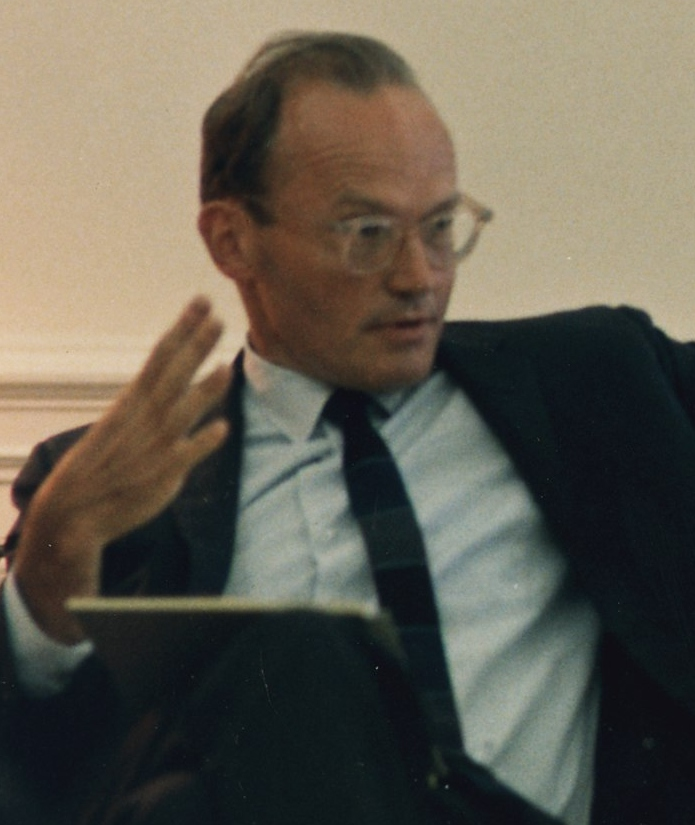
- Bundy in 1967

5th United States National Security Advisor
- In office January 20, 1961 – February 28, 1966
- President: John F. Kennedy; Lyndon B. Johnson
- Deputy: Carl Kaysen; Robert Komer; Francis M. Bator
- Preceded by: Gordon Gray
- Succeeded by: Walt Rostow

Personal details
- Born: March 30, 1919 Boston, Massachusetts, U.S.
- Died: September 16, 1996 (aged 77) Boston, Massachusetts, U.S.
- Resting place: Mount Auburn Cemetery
- Party: Republican
- Spouse: Mary Lothrop
- Children: 4, including James
- Relatives: Harvey Hollister Bundy (father); William Bundy (brother)
- Education: Yale University (AB); Harvard University (attended)

McGeorge "Mac" Bundy (March 30, 1919 – September 16, 1996) was an American academic who served as the U.S. National Security Advisor to Presidents John F. Kennedy and Lyndon B. Johnson from 1961 through 1966. He is primarily remembered as one of the chief architects of the United States' escalation of the Vietnam War. He was president of the Ford Foundation from 1966 through 1979.

After World War II, during which Bundy served as an intelligence officer, he was selected in 1949 to work for the Council on Foreign Relations. He worked with a study team on the implementation of the Marshall Plan. He was appointed a professor of government at Harvard University, and, in 1953, became its youngest dean for the Faculty of Arts and Sciences, working to develop Harvard as a merit-based university. In 1979, he returned to academia as professor of history at New York University, and later as scholar in residence at the Carnegie Corporation.

== Early life and education ==
Born in 1919 and raised in Boston, Massachusetts, Bundy was the third son in a prosperous family, long involved in Republican politics. His older brothers were Harvey Hollister Bundy, Jr., and William Putnam Bundy, and his two younger sisters were Harriet Lowell and Katharine Lawrence. His father, Harvey Hollister Bundy, from Grand Rapids, Michigan, was a prominent attorney in Boston who had clerked for Justice Oliver Wendell Holmes Jr. in his younger days. Bundy's mother, Katherine Lawrence Putnam, was related to several Boston Brahmin families listed in the Social Register: the Lowells, the Cabots, and the Lawrences. She was a niece of Harvard president Abbott Lawrence Lowell. Through his mother, Bundy grew up within other Boston Brahmin families, and remained throughout his life well connected with American elites.

The Bundys were close to Henry L. Stimson. As Secretary of State under Herbert Hoover, in 1931, Stimson appointed Bundy's father as his Assistant Secretary of State. Later, when Stimson was Secretary of War in World War II, Harvey Bundy served again under Stimson as Special Assistant on Atomic Matters, serving as liaison between Stimson and the director of the Office of Scientific Research and Development, Vannevar Bush. He worked on the implementation of the Marshall Plan after the war. McGeorge Bundy grew up knowing Stimson as a family friend and colleague of his father.

He attended the private Dexter School in Brookline, Massachusetts, and the elite Groton School, where he placed 1st in his class and ran the student newspaper and debating society. Biographer David Halberstam writes:

He [McGeorge Bundy] attended Groton, the greatest "Prep" school in the nation, where the American upper class sends its sons to instill the classic values: discipline, honor, a belief in the existing values and the rightness of them. Coincidentally, it's at Groton that one starts to meet the right people, and where connections which will serve well later on – be it at Wall Street or Washington – are first forged; one learns, at Groton, above all, the rules of the Game and even a special language: what washes and does not wash.

He was admitted to Yale University, one year behind his brother William. When applying to Yale, Bundy wrote on the entrance exam: "This question is silly. If I were giving the test, this is the question I would ask, and this is my answer." He was still admitted to Yale as he achieved perfect score on his entrance exam. At Yale, he served as secretary of the Yale Political Union and then chairman of its Liberal Party. He was on the staff of the Yale Literary Magazine and also wrote a column for the Yale Daily News, while, as a senior, he was awarded the Alpheus Henry Snow Prize. Like his father, he was inducted into the Skull and Bones secret society, where he was nicknamed "Odin." He remained in contact with his fellow Bonesmen for decades afterward. He graduated from Yale with an A.B. in mathematics in 1940. The same year, he advocated for American intervention in World War Two, writing: "Though war is evil, it is occasionally the lesser of two evils." In 1941, he was awarded a three-year Junior Fellowship in the Harvard Society of Fellows. At the time, Fellows were not allowed to pursue advanced degrees, "a requirement intended to keep them off the standard academic treadmill"; thus, Bundy would never earn a doctorate.

In 1941, he ran for the Ward 5 Seat on the Boston City Council. He was endorsed by the outgoing incumbent, Henry Lee Shattuck, but lost to A. Frank Foster by 92 votes.

=== Military service ===
During World War II, Bundy applied to join the United States Army despite his poor vision. He served as an intelligence officer. In 1943, he was posted as aide to Rear Admiral Alan G. Kirk, who knew his father. On June 6, 1944, as an aide to Admiral Kirk, Bundy witnessed first-hand the Operation Overlord landings from the deck of the cruiser USS Augusta.

He was discharged with the rank of captain in 1946 and returned to Harvard, where he completed the remaining two years of his Junior Fellowship.

== Academic career ==
From 1945 to 1947, Bundy worked with Henry Stimson as ghostwriter of his third-person autobiography, On Active Service in Peace and War, published in 1947. Stimson suffered a massive heart attack, which led to a speech impediment two months after completing his second appointment as United States Secretary of War in the fall of 1945, and Bundy's assistance was integral to the completion of the book.

In 1948, he worked for Republican presidential candidate Thomas E. Dewey as a speechwriter, specializing in foreign-policy issues. Bundy had expected Dewey to win the 1948 election, and to be rewarded with some sort of senior post in a Dewey administration. After Dewey's defeat, Bundy became a political analyst at the Council on Foreign Relations in New York, where he studied the Marshall Plan's aid to Europe. Notable members of the study group were Dwight D. Eisenhower, then serving as president of Columbia University; future Director of Central Intelligence Allen Dulles; future CIA official Richard M. Bissell, Jr.; and diplomat George F. Kennan. The group's deliberations were sensitive and secret, dealing as they did with the classified fact that there was a covert side to the Marshall Plan, Operation Gladio, by which the CIA used certain funds to aid anti-communist groups in France and Italy.

In 1949, Bundy was appointed visiting lecturer in Harvard University's Department of Government. He taught about the history of U.S. foreign policy and was popular among students; after two years, he was promoted to associate professor and recommended for tenure. After his promotion to full professor in 1953, Bundy was appointed dean of Harvard's Faculty of Arts and Sciences, at age 34, the youngest person to have received a decanal appointment in the university's history as of 2025. An effective and popular administrator, Bundy initiated policy changes intended to develop Harvard as a class-blind, merit-based university, aiming to build a reputation for stellar academics. He was elected Fellow of the American Academy of Arts and Sciences in 1954.

He was listed as one of the "young American scholars known as 'New Conservatives'" by Peter Viereck in 1956. During his time as Dean at Harvard, Bundy met for the first time Senator John F. Kennedy who sat on the Harvard Board of Overseers. In 1991, he was elected to the American Philosophical Society.

== National Security Advisor and Vietnam War ==
Bundy moved into public life in 1961 when he was appointed National Security Advisor in the administration of President John F. Kennedy. Kennedy considered Bundy for Secretary of State, but decided that since he was a relatively youthful president, he should name an older man as Secretary of State. In common with other members of Kennedy's cabinet, Bundy considered the Secretary of State, Dean Rusk, to be ineffectual. Bundy, a registered Republican, offered to switch parties to become a registered Democrat when he entered the White House but Kennedy declined the offer, saying he preferred to have a Republican as National Security Adviser to rebut charges that he was "soft on Communism."

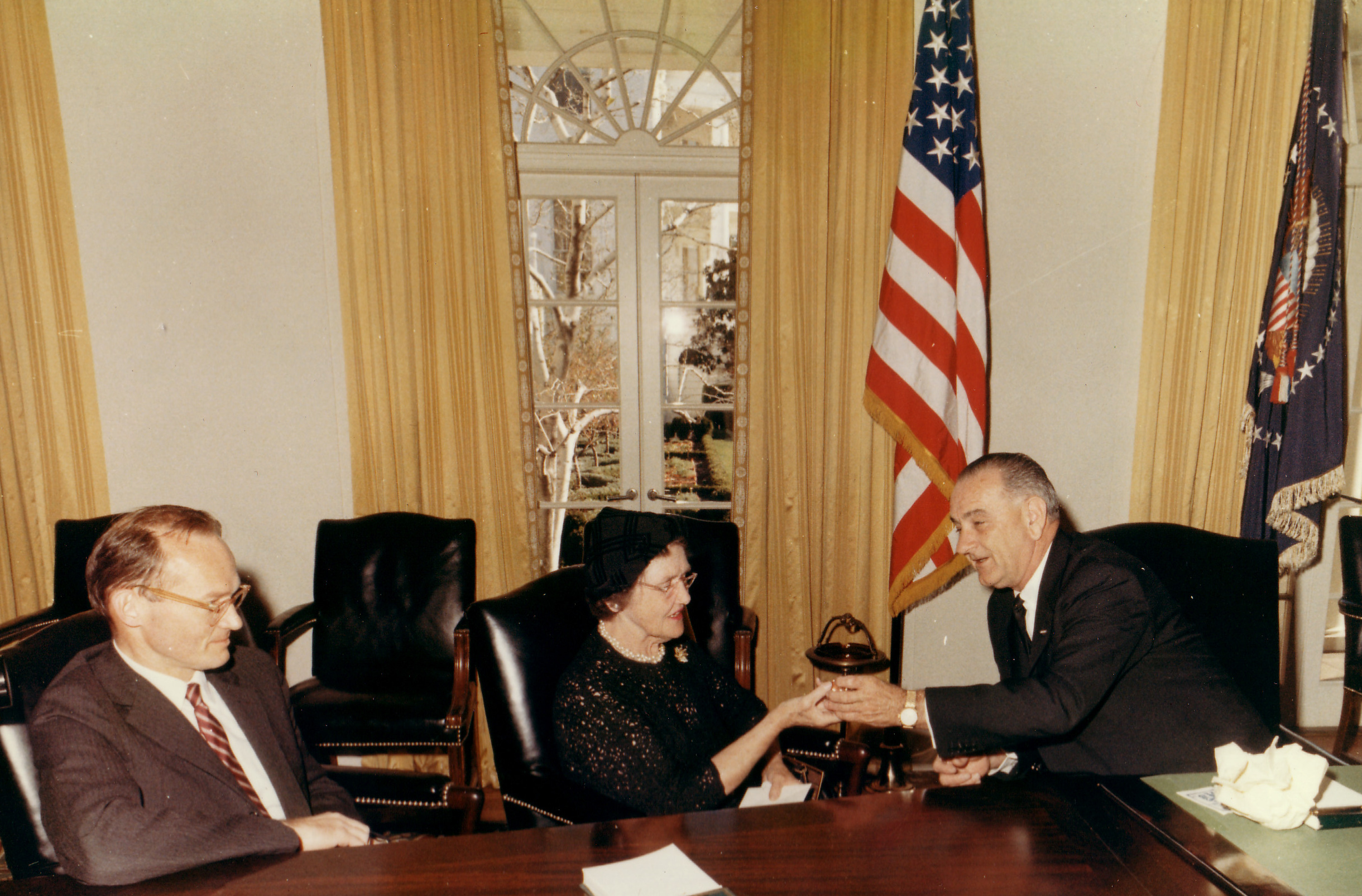
Bundy with his mother and recently sworn in President Johnson in the Cabinet Room, November 1963

One of Kennedy's "best and brightest" young political activists who also came to be known as "the New Frontiersmen," Bundy was crucially involved in almost all of the major foreign policy and defense decisions of the Kennedy administration, and was retained by Lyndon B. Johnson for part of his presidential tenure. Bundy was involved in the Bay of Pigs Invasion, the Cuban Missile Crisis, and the Vietnam War. At the first meeting of the National Security Council under Kennedy, Bundy was told the four areas of worry were Cuba, the Congo, Laos, and Vietnam. From 1964 to 1966, he was also chair of the 303 Committee, responsible for coordinating covert operations.

Bundy was a strong proponent of the Vietnam War during his tenure, believing it essential to contain communism. He supported the escalation of American involvement, including the commitment of hundreds of thousands of ground troops and the sustained bombing of North Vietnam in 1965. According to author and columnist Kai Bird, Bundy and other advisors well understood the risk but proceeded with these actions largely because of domestic politics, rather than believing that the US had a realistic chance of victory in this war.

In November 1961, Bundy advised Kennedy to send a division to fight in Vietnam, writing: "Laos was never really ours after 1954. South Vietnam is and wants to be." In 1963, Bundy vetoed an attempt by another Harvard professor, Henry Kissinger, to join the Kennedy administration. He knew Kissinger well and told Kennedy that Kissinger was a schemer who was not to be trusted. In August 1963, when the diplomat Paul Kattenburg advised ending American support for South Vietnam, Bundy was extremely critical, arguing that American aid to South Vietnam was working as planned and accusing Kattenburg of making an argument with no evidence. In October 1963, he agreed to the transfer of the CIA station chief, John Richardson, to help clear the way for a coup against President Diem. Just before the coup on 29 October 1963, Bundy wired the American ambassador in Saigon, Henry Cabot Lodge: "We do not accept as a basis for U.S. policy that we have no power to delay or discourage a coup." On the night of 1 November, Bundy stayed up all night, awaiting news of the coup, and reported to Kennedy in the morning that only the presidential guard had stayed loyal while the rest of the South Vietnamese Army had supported the coup. On 4 November, Bundy told the media that the United States would recognize the new government in Saigon. The same day he told to Kennedy that photographs of corpses of the Ngo brothers (Diệm and Nhu) might appear in the media showing their hands tied behind their backs and bullet holes through the back of their heads, joking that this was not his preferred way to commit suicide (it was initially announced that both Ngo brothers had committed suicide, though it was later acknowledged that they had been executed).

On 22 November 1963, Bundy was at his office in Washington when he received a telephone call from Defense Secretary Robert McNamara telling him that Kennedy had just been assassinated while visiting Dallas, Texas, and Bundy broke down in tears at the news of the death of his friend.

Bundy took a somewhat patronizing attitude to the new president, Lyndon Johnson, telling him before his first cabinet meeting as president to "avoid any suggestion of over-assertiveness." In the spring of 1964, Bundy told Johnson that the South Vietnamese government was unable to defeat the Viet Cong and American intervention would probably be necessary. As he sought to ingratiate himself with Johnson, his once friendly relations with Robert Kennedy declined as the latter considered him a "turncoat." Johnson was annoyed by Bundy's habit, which started when Kennedy was president, of popping in and out of the Oval Office as it suited him, and asked him to stick to a strict schedule.

In January 1964, Bundy advised Johnson to dismiss General Paul D. Harkins as commander of the Military Assistance Command, Vietnam, writing: "I do not know anyone, except perhaps Max Taylor, in the top circle of the government who believes that General Harkins is the right man for the war in Vietnam now … Harkins has been unimpressive in his reporting and analyzing, and has shown a lack of grip on the realities of the situation." Bundy advised replacing Harkins with General William Westmoreland, saying Vietnam is "much too important to be decided by Bob McNamara's reluctance to offend Max Taylor," and that Johnson had the power "to give him a direct order to do what in his heart he knows he should. He is a soldier." Johnson, in general, was said to distrust Bundy because of his family's inherited wealth and his elite status as a product of Ivy League universities; he much preferred McNamara who became rich as an executive with the Ford Motor Company and had only attended Harvard Business School. For his part, Bundy found many of Johnson's mannerisms highly offensive such as his practice of exposing his penis to prove that he was well endowed and refusing to close the bathroom door when he was using the toilet. Johnson reportedly enjoyed offending Bundy.

In October 1964, when the Undersecretary of State, George Ball, circulated a memo titled "How Valid Are the Assumptions Underlying Our Vietnam Policy?", Bundy emerged as Ball's leading critic and submitted to Johnson a detailed memo arguing there was no comparison between the French and American wars in Vietnam. In December 1964, after the Vietcong bombed the Brink's Hotel in Saigon, Bundy advised Johnson to begin a strategic bombing campaign against North Vietnam, presenting in a memo five reasons not to bomb North Vietnam vs. nine reasons to bomb North Vietnam. Bundy predicated that bombing North Vietnam would solve South Vietnam's morale problems, saying the South Vietnamese soldiers would fight better once they knew the United States was involved in the war. In a cable to Maxwell Taylor, the ambassador in Saigon, Johnson gave domestic reasons why he would not bomb North Vietnam at present, saying he was about to introduce his Great Society reforms soon, complaining about conservative Republicans and Democrats that, "[t]hey hate this stuff, they don't want to help the poor and the Negroes, but they're afraid to be against it at a time like this when there's all this prosperity. But the war—oh, they'll like the war." However, Johnson added that, once his Great Society reforms were adopted by Congress, he would commit the United States to war, saying he had doubts that North Vietnam could be defeated by strategic bombing alone, but that he would also send American troops to fight in South Vietnam sometime in 1965.

In February 1965, Bundy visited South Vietnam. On 7 February 1965, the Viet Cong attacked an American air base at Pleiku with mortars, killing eight Americans and wounding 126. Bundy advised Johnson to begin a strategic bombing campaign against North Vietnam in retaliation. He visited the Pleiku base afterwards, where he was disturbed by the sight of the wounded servicemen, saying he'd never seen so much blood in all his life. Upon his return to Washington, he sent a memo to the president, writing: "The situation in Vietnam is deteriorating, and without new U.S. action, defeat appears inevitable—probably not in a matter of weeks or perhaps even months, but within the next year or so. There is still time to turn [this] around, but not much. The stakes in Vietnam are extremely high, the American investment is very large, and the American responsibility is a fact of life which is palpable in the atmosphere of Asia, and even elsewhere. The international prestige of the United States, and a substantial part of our influence, are directly at risk in Vietnam." He called for "graduated and continuing bombings" of North Vietnam as the best response, reporting that what he saw in South Vietnam suggested that the majority of the South Vietnamese people believed "the Vietcong are going to win in the long run." When British Prime Minister Harold Wilson, who was worried by Johnson's Vietnam policy, proposed a summit in an attempt to change it, Bundy told the British ambassador Lord Harlech that such a summit would be "unhelpful". The columnist Walter Lippmann contacted Bundy asking him to advise Johnson to change his Vietnam policy, only to find that the National Security Adviser was solidly loyal to the president. Lippmann was astonished by Bundy's ignorance about Vietnamese history as he discovered Bundy had no idea that South Vietnam was a recent creation.

Bundy advised Johnson that the best way to "sell" the Vietnam War to the American people was as an extension of the Great Society. He told the president he should create a multi-billion dollar Southeast Asia Development Corporation that would build an enormous dam on the Mekong River which he wrote would be "bigger and more imaginative than the TVA and a lot tougher to do", but the proposed Corporation and its dam on the Mekong would be able to bring electricity to all of Southeast Asia and thereby industrialize the entire region within the next twenty or so years. In a speech on 7 April 1965 at Johns Hopkins University, Johnson proposed the creation of the Southeast Asia Development Corporation and a dam on the Mekong that would electrify all of Southeast Asia, saying that the Vietnam war was a struggle for economic development, which he accused North Vietnam of seeking to prevent. As the war continued, Johnson berated Bundy, saying he wanted "more ideas and more horsepower and more imagination".

In March 1965, the first "teach-in" to protest the Vietnam war was held at the University of Michigan and Bundy was challenged to a debate, which he declined, saying in a public letter "if your letter came to me for grading as a professor, I would not be able to give it high marks". Subsequently, Bundy accepted a challenge from George McTurnan Kahin, a Cornell University professor who specialized in Southeast Asia, for a public debate to be televised live on 15 May 1965. Johnson did not want the debate to take place, fearing that Bundy might lose, so he arranged to send Bundy to the Dominican Republic, causing him to miss the debate. One of the debate's organizers, Barry Commoner, a biologist at the University of Washington, commented that Bundy might desire to give other professors bad marks for their letters, but he "has turned in a terrible record on attendance". When the Harvard Crimson newspaper ran an editorial criticizing the Vietnam War, Bundy who always closely followed developments at Harvard, wrote an 11-page rebuttal criticizing the editorial and compared the editors of the Harvard Crimson to the appeasers of the 1930s.

When Bundy realized that Johnson had sent him to Santo Domingo to prevent him from debating Kahin, he contacted Fred Friendly, a television producer at CBS, without informing the president, saying he wanted to debate Hans Morgenthau, an international affairs professor at the University of Chicago, live on television. When the president learned that CBS was airing the Bundy-Morgenthau debate on 21 June 1965, he was incensed, saying to his aide Bill Moyers: "Do you see this? Bundy is going on television—on national television—with five professors. That's an act of disloyalty. He didn't tell me because he knew I didn't want him to do it". Johnson told Moyers to sack Bundy on the spot, but soon after changed his mind. Relations between Johnson and Bundy were notably tense afterwards.

On 21 June 1965, the television debate was aired live under the title Vietnam Dialogue: Mr. Bundy and the Professors with Eric Sevareid as the moderator. During the debate, Bundy accused Morgenthau of being a defeatist and pessimist, citing his 1961 statement that Laos was destined to go Communist, which led Morgenthau to reply: "I may have been dead wrong on Laos, but it doesn't mean I am dead wrong on Vietnam". Bundy then brought up a statement Morgenthau made in 1956, praising President Diem of South Vietnam for creating a "miracle". Bundy was generally considered to have won the debate, but Johnson was still furious with him, and Bundy privately conceded that his time as National Security Adviser was coming to a close. Johnson instructed Moyers to terminate Bundy, who upon being told he was fired, stated "Again?" and went back to work. Though Johnson kept changing his mind about sacking him, Bundy could see his time at the White House was limited, and he contacted Nathan Pusey, the president of Harvard, asking if he could return to academia.

In June 1965, Bundy advised Johnson not to step up the bombing in response to the execution by the Viet Cong of an American POW, Sergeant Harold Bennett, warning that this would mean in a certain sense losing control of the level of the bombing: such a precedent would mean the United States would have to step up the bombing in the event of future atrocities. However, Bundy told Ball at the time that his influence over Johnson was in decline and he did not expect his advice to be accepted. Johnson ordered that the bombing be increased, against Bundy's advice. In July 1965, Bundy recruited a group of elder statesmen known as "the Wise Men" to occasionally advise the president,. whose unofficial leader was former Secretary of State Dean Acheson. The first meeting of the "Wise Men" did not go well: Johnson reportedly engaged in an extended bout of self-pity, complaining that he had only acted in Vietnam because he had to and that he was being unfairly criticized by the media and Congress; this bout was much to the disgust of the "Wise Men". However, the elder statesmen expressed their approval of Johnson's Vietnam policy, and Bundy afterwards thanked Acheson, saying that Johnson now felt more confident that he was acting correctly.

Despite his support for the war, Bundy criticized what he regarded as sloppy thinking by other members of Johnson's cabinet, most notably in July 1965 when he attacked the plans of McNamara to send more troops to Vietnam as being "rash to the point of folly...In particular I see no reason to suppose that the Vietcong will accommodate us by fighting the kind of war we desire. I think the odds are that if we put in 40-50 battalions with the missions here proposed, we shall find them only lightly engaged and ineffective in hot pursuit." He stated that the problem with Vietnam was that the South Vietnamese state was dysfunctional, observing, "...this is a slippery slope toward total U.S. responsibility and corresponding fecklessness on the Vietnamese side". He advised Johnson not to send more troops to South Vietnam as a way to pressure the South Vietnamese to make reforms, asking him to ponder: "What are the chances of our getting into a white man's war with all the brown men against us or apathetic?" However, Bundy was still committed to the war. In a memo titled "France in Vietnam, 1954, and the U.S. in Vietnam, 1965—A Useful Analogy?" he wrote that France failed because of "the war's acute unpopularity" and "French political instability", none of which Bundy claimed applied to the United States in 1965. Expanding on this theme, Bundy wrote: "France was never united or consistent in her prosecution of the war in Indochina. The war was not popular in France itself, was actively opposed on the left, and was cynically used by others for domestic political ends". By contrast, Bundy wrote that, at present, only academics and churchmen were opposed to the war in the US, and they were "a minority within a minority," reminding Johnson that, according to the most recent polls, 62% of Americans supported the war.

In July 1965, an American diplomat in Paris, Ed Gullion, opened up secret talks with Mai Van Bo, who headed the National Liberation Front's office in Paris. To provide secrecy, Gullion was code-named R. Bundy advised Johnson to let the talks proceed, writing: "Let R do the talking this time and see if there is any give in his position". However, the "XYZ talks" as the negotiations were called floundered over the demand that the United States unconditionally cease bombing North Vietnam as a precondition for peace talks.

As Pusey was unable to give him a position consistent with his former station, Bundy contacted John McCloy, the chairman of the Ford Foundation, to see if he could become president of the Ford Foundation. Bundy had difficult relations with Johnson by this point, but he felt it was his patriotic duty as an American to leave government service in a manner that did not embarrass the president. On 8 November 1965, Bundy was offered the presidency of the Ford Foundation, whose annual pay was $75,000 compared to the $30,000 he made as National Security Adviser. Furthermore, the Ford Foundation had an endowment of $200 million to be spent annually, making it the world's biggest charity, which appealed to Bundy because ostensibly it would allow him to maintain that he was still engaged in important work. Through Bundy had discussed his interest in the Ford Foundation with Johnson previously, when the president learned, from reading the New York Times, that the offer had been made, he was notably angry. He agreed to stay on until the end of 1966, but Johnson became abrasive and abusive towards him, taking the viewpoint that Bundy was guilty of betraying him and a coward who was leaving because he could not handle the stress of the Vietnam War. As Johnson ceased listening to Bundy, his role by the end of 1966 had been reduced to reporting information and laying out options for the president. In his last memo to Johnson in 1966, he reported that China was denouncing the Americans as "running dogs of imperialism"; that Marshal Josip Broz Tito of Yugoslavia believed a peaceful end to the war was possible with time; the governments of Hungary and Algeria were offering to serve as intermediaries in peace talks; French president Charles de Gaulle wanted the United States to cease bombing North Vietnam and to open talks; and the governments of Britain and Canada were pressing the Soviet Union to pressure, in turn, North Vietnam to open peace talks. In his last service to Johnson, when Senator Robert F. Kennedy criticized the Vietnam War in a speech on 31 October 1966, Bundy went on the news show Meet the Press to defend the Johnson administration and rebut Kennedy's criticism.

== Return to academia ==
Bundy left government in 1966 to serve as president of the Ford Foundation, remaining in this position until 1979. On 12 October 1968, Bundy criticized the Vietnam War in a speech, saying: "There is no prospect of military victory against North Vietnam by any level of U.S. military force which is acceptable or desirable."

After testifying before the Church Committee in 1975, Bundy issued a statement: "As far as I ever knew, or know now, no one in the White House or at the Cabinet level ever gave any approval of any kind to any CIA effort to assassinate anyone." Bundy added: "I told the committee in particular that it is wholly inconsistent with what I know of President Kennedy and his brother Robert that either of them would have given any such order or authorization or consent to anyone through any channel."

Beginning in 1979, Bundy returned to academia as a professor of history at New York University. He was professor emeritus from 1989 until his death. During this period, he helped found the group known as the "Gang of Four," whose other members were George F. Kennan, Robert McNamara and Gerard Smith; together they spoke and wrote about American nuclear policies. They published an influential 1983 Foreign Affairs article that proposed ending the US policy of "first use of nuclear weapons to stop a Soviet invasion of Europe". He also wrote Danger and Survival: Choices About the Bomb in the First Fifty Years (1988). Their work has been credited with contributing to the SALT II treaty a decade later.

Bundy was employed by the Carnegie Corporation of New York from 1990 until his death, serving as chair of the Committee on Reducing the Nuclear Danger (1990–1993) and scholar-in-residence (1993–1996).

== Personal life and death ==
In 1950, he married Mary Buckminster Lothrop, who came from a socially prominent and wealthy Bostonian family; they had four sons.

Bundy died on 16 September 1996 from a heart attack at age 77. His body is buried at Mount Auburn Cemetery in Cambridge, Massachusetts.

== Legacy ==
- In 1969 he was presented with the Presidential Medal of Freedom by President Lyndon Johnson, one of 20 to receive the medal "in the last 24 hours of [Johnson's] presidency in January 1969".
- Bundy was later included on President Richard Nixon's "Enemies List", his compilation of political opponents.
- Views of Bundy's role in the Vietnam War changed over the decades. Gordon Goldstein's 2008 book, Lessons in Disaster: McGeorge Bundy and the Path to War in Vietnam, was reported in late September 2009 as the "must-read book" among President Barack Obama's war advisers, as they contemplated the alternative courses ahead in Afghanistan. Richard C. Holbrooke, who had reviewed the book in late November 2008, was a member of the team of presidential advisers in 2009.

== Publications ==
Articles

- “To Cap the Volcano”. Foreign Affairs, vol. 48, no. 1, October 1969. pp. 1–20. JSTOR 20039419. doi:10.2307/20039419.
  - Available online at the Foreign Affairs archives.
- "The Issue Before the Court: Who Gets Ahead in America?", The Atlantic Monthly vol. 240, no. 5, November 1977. pp. 41–54.

Books

- On Active Service in Peace and War (Co-authored by Henry Stimson). New York: Harper & Brothers, 1947.
- Danger and Survival: Choices about the Bomb in the First Fifty Years. New York: Vintage Books, 1988. ISBN 0-394-52278-8.

== Media ==
Appearances

- Cuban Missile Crisis Revisited. Produced for The Idea Channel by the Free to Choose Network, 1983.
  - Phase I (U1015) (January 22, 1983)
    - Featuring McGeorge Bundy, Richard Neustadt, Edwin Martin, Dean Rusk & Donald Wilson in Atlanta, Georgia.
  - Phase II, Part I (U1016) (June 27, 1983)
    - Featuring McGeorge Bundy, Richard Neustadt, Robert S. McNamara, George W. Ball & U. Alexis Johnson in Washington D.C.
  - Phase II, Part II (U1017) (June 27, 1983)
    - Featuring McGeorge Bundy, Richard Neustadt, Robert S. McNamara, George W. Ball & U. Alexis Johnson in Washington D.C.
- At the Brink: War and Peace in the Nuclear Age. Episode 105. WBGH, March 20, 1986.
  - Full transcript available.

Portrayal in other media

Bundy and his role have been featured in feature and TV films:

- He was played by James Olson in the made-for-TV film, The Missiles of October (1974).
- In the 2000 film Thirteen Days, McGeorge Bundy is portrayed by Frank Wood.
- In the 2002 HBO film Path to War, Bundy is portrayed by Cliff DeYoung.
- In the 2013 TV film, Killing Kennedy, Bundy was portrayed by Ray Nedzel.

== See also ==
- The Best and the Brightest by David Halberstam
- Bundy Report
- Ford Foundation
- Carnegie Corporation
- Council on Foreign Relations

== Books and articles ==
- Langguth, A.J. (2000). Our Vietnam The War 1954-1975. Simon & Schuster. ISBN 0743212312.

Political offices
Preceded by Gordon Gray	National Security Advisor; 1961–1966	Succeeded by Walt Rostow
