= Sean O'Neill (diplomat) =

American diplomat

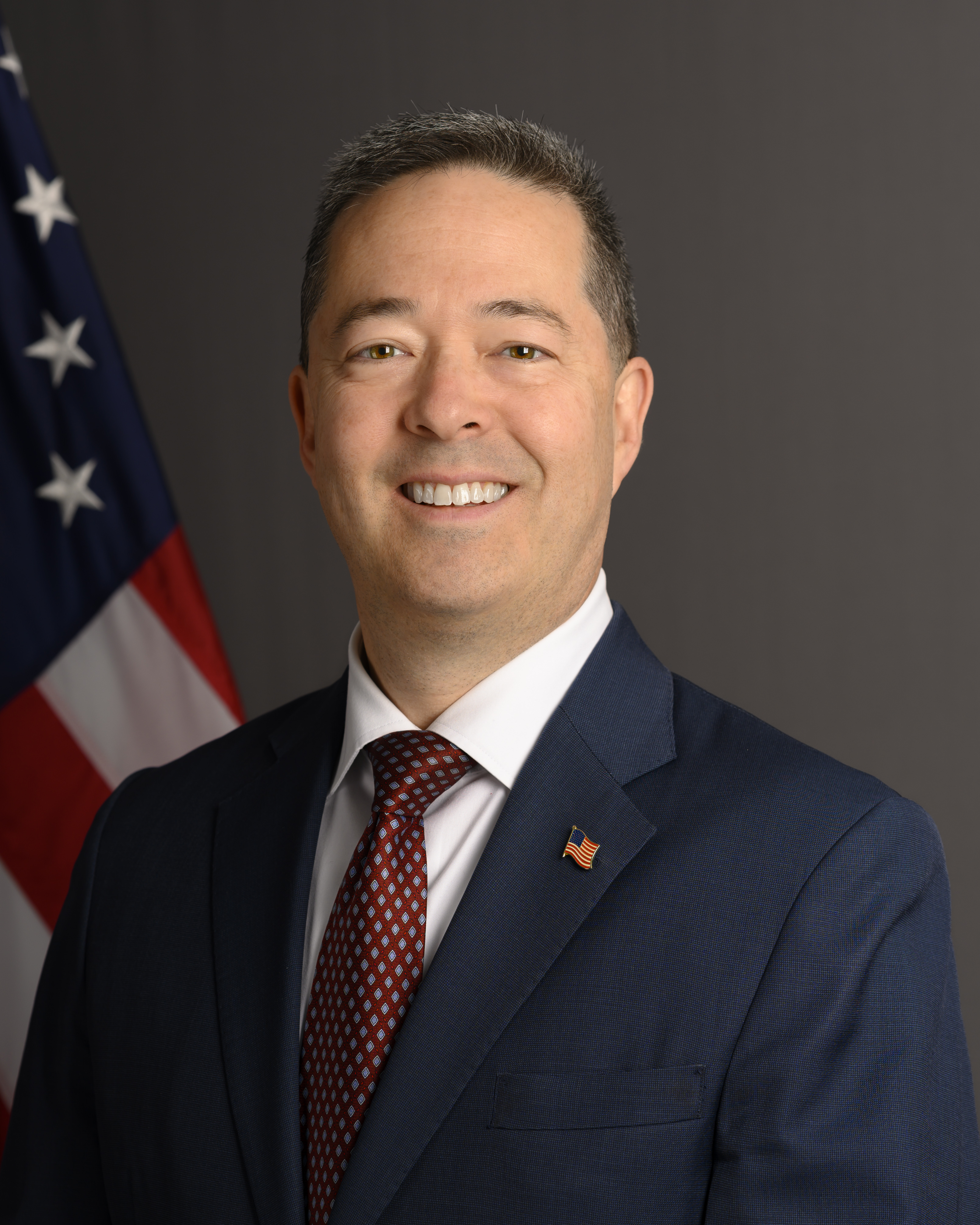

United States Ambassador to Thailand
- Incumbent
- Assumed office February 11, 2026
- President: Donald Trump
- Preceded by: Robert F. Godec

Personal details
- Spouse: Sachiyo Kubo
- Education: Tulane University; Fordham University

Sean Kotaro O'Neill is an American diplomat and the United States Ambassador to Thailand since February 2026. O'Neill is a career member of the Senior Foreign Service, and he had served as Senior Bureau Official for the US State Department's Bureau of East Asian and Pacific Affairs.

== Career ==
O'Neill previously served as United States Consul-General in Chiang Mai.

On July 9, 2025, President Donald Trump nominated O'Neill to be the next United States Ambassador to Thailand, succeeding Robert Godec.

O'Neill was confirmed by the Senate on October 7, 2025. He was among a group of over 100 nominees confirmed with a simple majority vote of 51 to 47.

Deputy Secretary of State Christopher Landau administered the oath of office to O'Neill on November 12, 2025 in the Franklin Room of the United States Department of State. He arrived in Bangkok in December 2025 and presented his credentials to King of Thailand Vajiralongkorn on February 11, 2026.

O’Neill has studied Thai, Chinese, Burmese, Bengali and Japanese.

== Personal life ==
O'Neill is married to Sachiyo Kubo.
