= George Ball (diplomat) =

United States diplomat that spoke out against U.S. involvement in Vietnam

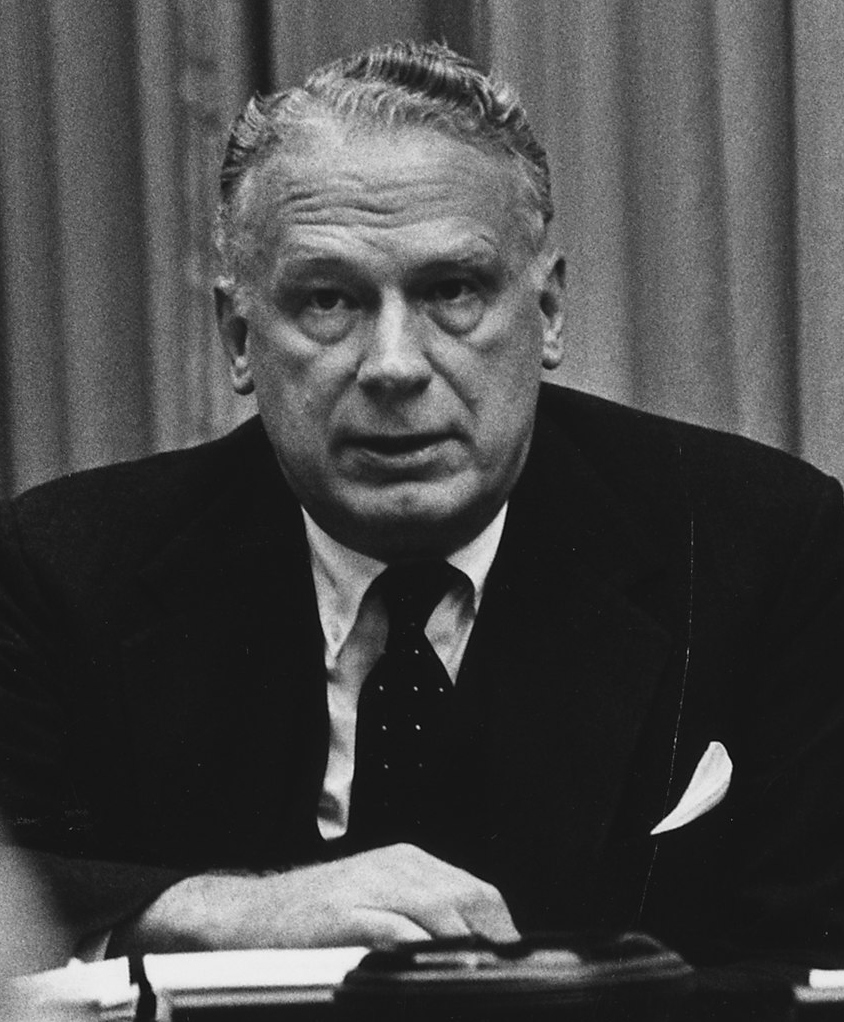
- Ball in 1966

7th United States Ambassador to the United Nations
- In office June 26, 1968 – September 25, 1968
- President: Lyndon B. Johnson
- Preceded by: Arthur Goldberg
- Succeeded by: James R. Wiggins

23rd United States Under Secretary of State
- In office December 4, 1961 – September 30, 1966
- President: John F. Kennedy; Lyndon B. Johnson
- Preceded by: Chester Bowles
- Succeeded by: Nicholas Katzenbach

3rd Under Secretary of State for Economic Affairs
- In office February 1, 1961 – December 3, 1961
- President: John F. Kennedy
- Preceded by: C. Douglas Dillon
- Succeeded by: Thomas C. Mann

Personal details
- Born: George Wildman Ball; December 21, 1909 Des Moines, Iowa, U.S.
- Died: May 26, 1994 (aged 84) New York City, New York, U.S.
- Party: Democratic
- Education: Northwestern University (BS, JD)

George Wildman Ball (December 21, 1909 – May 26, 1994) was an American diplomat and banker. He served in the management of the U.S. State Department from 1961 to 1966 and is remembered by most as the only cabinet member of Presidents John F. Kennedy and Lyndon B. Johnson who was a major dissenter against the escalation of the Vietnam War. Ball advised against deploying U.S. combat forces, as he believed it would lead the United States into an unwinnable war and result in a prolonged conflict. Instead, he argued that the United States should prioritize allocating its resources to Europe rather than engaging in expensive military ventures. However, he refused to publicize his doubts.

He helped determine American policy regarding trade expansion, Congo, the Multilateral Force, de Gaulle's France, Israel and the rest of the Middle East, and the Iranian Revolution.

== Early life and education ==
Ball was born in Des Moines, Iowa. He lived in Evanston, Illinois, and graduated from Evanston Township High School and Northwestern University with a Bachelor of Science (BS) and a Juris Doctor (JD). Ball joined a Chicago law firm in which Adlai Stevenson II was one of the partners, and became a protégé of Stevenson.

== Early career ==
During 1942, he became an official of the Lend-Lease program. During 1944 and 1945, he was director of the Strategic Bombing Survey in London.

In 1945, together with John Kenneth Galbraith, Ball interrogated Albert Speer, who was the economics minister in the short lived Flensburg Government. Their notes from the interrogation were used in many histories of the 3rd Reich. When Ball and Galbraith visited Albert Speer after his arrest, Speer asked Ball to be his lawyer for the upcoming Nuremberg trials. Ball declined.

During 1945, Ball began collaboration with Jean Monnet and the French government in its economic recovery in its negotiations regarding the Marshall Plan. In 1946, Ball co-founded the law firm of Cleary, Gottlieb, Steen & Hamilton, along with Henry J. Friendly, later the chief judge of the Second Circuit Court of Appeals. During 1950 he helped draft the Schuman Plan and the European Coal and Steel Community Treaty.

Ball had a major role in Stevenson's presidential campaign during 1952. He was the liaison between Stevenson and President Truman and helped publicize Stevenson's opinions in major magazine articles. He was also the executive director of the Volunteers For Stevenson, concerned mainly with enlisting independent and Republican voters. He was also a speechwriter in the Stevenson campaign. Ball likewise had a major role in Stevenson's 1956 presidential campaign and unsuccessful 1960 bid to gain the Democratic nomination.

== State Department ==
Ball was the Under Secretary of State for the administrations of John F. Kennedy and Lyndon B. Johnson. He is known for his opposition to escalation of the Vietnam War.

After Kennedy decided to send 16,000 "trainers" to Vietnam, Ball, the one dissenter in Kennedy’s entourage, pleaded with JFK to recall France’s devastating defeat in 1954 at Dien Bien Phu and throughout Indochina. Ball raised the question with President Kennedy. (November 7, 1961) "Within five years we'll have 300,000 men in the paddies and jungles and never find them again. That was the French experience. Vietnam is the worst possible terrain both from a physical and political point of view." (Note: Another version of the quote has Ball using slightly different wording: "If we go down that road we might have, within five years, 300,000 men in the rice paddies of the jungles of Viet-Nam and never be able to find them.") In response to this prediction, the President seemed unwilling to discuss the matter, responding with an overtone of asperity: "George, you're just crazier than hell. That just isn't going happen." As Ball later wrote, Kennedy's "statement could be interpreted in two ways: either he was convinced that events would so evolve as not to require escalation, or he was determined not to permit such escalation to occur."

Ball was one of the endorsers of the 1963 coup which resulted in the death of South Vietnamese President Ngo Dinh Diem and his brother.

As President Johnson was urged by his closest foreign policy and defense advisors to initiate a sustained bombing campaign against North Vietnam during the winter of 1964–1965, Ball forcefully warned Johnson against such an action. In a February 24, 1965, memorandum he passed to the President through his aide Bill Moyers, Ball provided an accurate analysis of the situation in South Vietnam, and of the U.S. stake in it, as well as a startlingly prescient description of the disaster any escalation of American involvement would entail. Urging Johnson to re-examine all the assumptions inherent in the arguments for increasing U.S. involvement, Ball stood alone among the upper echelons of Johnson's policymakers when he attacked the prevailing notion, virtually unquestioned at the time in Washington, that America's fundamental strategic interest in escalating the conflict was in protecting U.S. international prestige and the reliability of its commitments to allies.

He observed that other international actors, including both allies and enemies, were concerned not whether the U.S. could live up to its promise but rather whether the U.S. could avert a disaster in time instead of squandering strategic capital in a struggle to assist a failed regime. If the U.S. continued in its course, Ball argued, U.S. loyalty would be less questioned than U.S. strategic judgement would. Although Johnson considered the memorandum seriously, Ball had waited too long to deliver it. The decision had already been made, and sustained U.S. bombing operations against North Vietnam commenced on March 2, 1965.

Six days after Rolling Thunder began, the U.S. began deploying substantial combat troops to South Vietnam, beginning with 3,500 troops arriving in Da Nang. Again, Ball sent Johnson a memorandum urgently pleading with him to change course, and once again, he used language that time would prove to be highly prescient:

Once large numbers of US troops are committed to direct combat, they will begin to take heavy casualties in a war they are ill-equipped to fight in a non-cooperative if not downright hostile countryside. Once we suffer large casualties we will have started a well-nigh irreversible process. Our involvement will be so great that we cannot – without national humiliation – stop short of achieving our complete objectives. Of the two possibilities I think humiliation would be more likely than the achievement of our objectives – even after we have paid terrible costs.

Ball also served as U.S. Ambassador to the United Nations from June 26 to September 25, 1968. During August 1968 at the UN Security Council, he endorsed the Czechoslovaks' struggle against the Soviet invasion and their right to live without dictatorship.

During the Nixon administration, Ball helped draft American policy proposals on the Persian Gulf.

In late November 1978, President Carter commissioned Ball to prepare an independent assessment of the events in Iran and a set of policy recommendations.

== Arguments ==
External videos
- Booknotes interview with Ball on The Passionate Attachment: America's Involvement in Israel, 1947 to the Present, May 23, 1993, C-SPAN

Ball was long a critic of Israeli policies toward its Arab neighbors. He "called for the recalibration of America’s Israel policy in a much noted Foreign Affairs essay" during 1977 and, during 1992, co-authored The Passionate Attachment with his son, Douglas Ball. The book argued that American aid to Israel has been morally, politically and financially costly, and described the weaponization of antisemitism for political purposes. Elsewhere in the book, referring to the Israeli attack on the USS Liberty, Ball asserted, "... the ultimate lesson of the Liberty attack had far more effect on policy in Israel than in America. Israel's leaders concluded that nothing they might do would offend the Americans to the point of reprisal. If America's leaders did not have the courage to punish Israel for the blatant murder of American citizens, it seemed clear that their American friends would let them get away with almost anything."

He often used the aphorism "Nothing propinks like propinquity," later dubbed the Ball Rule of Power. It means that the more direct access one has to the president, the greater one's power regardless of title.

Ball was an advocate of free trade, multinational corporations and their theoretical ability to neutralize what he considered to be "obsolete" nation states. Until and after his ambassadorship, Ball was employed by the banking company Lehman Brothers Kuhn Loeb. He was a senior managing director at Lehman Brothers until his retirement during 1982. Ball was among the first North American members of the Bilderberg Group, attending every meeting except for one before his death. He was a member of the Steering Committee of the group.

== Death ==
Ball died in New York City on May 26, 1994.

== Popular culture ==
George Ball was portrayed by John Randolph in the 1974 made-for-TV movie The Missiles of October, by James Karen in the 2000 movie Thirteen Days and by Bruce McGill in the 2002 TV movie Path to War.

== Books ==
- The Past Has Another Pattern: Memoirs, ISBN 0-393-30142-7. W. W. Norton. 1983
- The Passionate Attachment: America's Involvement With Israel, 1947 to the Present, with Douglas B. Ball, ISBN 0-393-02933-6. W. W. Norton. 1992

== Media appearances ==
- Cuban Missile Crisis Revisited. Produced for The Idea Channel by the Free to Choose Network, 1983.
  - Phase II, Part I (U1016) (June 27, 1983)
    - Featuring McGeorge Bundy, Richard Neustadt, Robert S. McNamara & U. Alexis Johnson in Washington D.C.
  - Phase II, Part II (U1017) (June 27, 1983)
    - Featuring McGeorge Bundy, Richard Neustadt, Robert S. McNamara & U. Alexis Johnson in Washington D.C.

== See also ==
- The Best and the Brightest

== Explanatory notes ==
Political offices
Preceded by C. Douglas Dillon	Under Secretary of State for Economic Growth, Energy, and the Environment; 1961	Succeeded by Thomas C. Mann
Preceded by Chester Bowles	United States Under Secretary of State; 1961–1966	Succeeded by Nicholas Katzenbach
Diplomatic posts
Preceded by Arthur Goldberg	United States Ambassador to the United Nations; 1968	Succeeded by James R. Wiggins
