= Reneau Z. Peurifoy =

American author and marriage counselor

Reneau Z. Peurifoy (October 14, 1949) is a self-help book author and marriage counselor.

== Biography ==
His first book, Anxiety, Phobias & Panic: Taking Charge and Conquering Fear currently has over 180,000 copies in print. Originally published in 1988. A revised second edition was released by Warner Books in 1995. It was again updated and released in its third edition in 2005. It has a UK edition as well as editions in German, Spanish, and Hungarian. His second book, Overcoming Anxiety: From Short-Term Fixes to Long-Term Recovery, was released in 1997 by Henry Holt. It also has a Spanish edition and will soon be released in a German edition. His third book, Anger: Taming the Beast, was released in June 1999 by Kodansha America. It also has a Dutch edition and will soon be released in a German edition by Hans Huber.

Mr. Peurifoy's fourth book, Why Did God Give Us Emotions? was released in September 2009.

== Personal ==
Mr. Peurifoy was in private practice for twenty years (1980 – 2000) as a marriage and family therapist specializing in anxiety disorders. He retired from private practice in 2000 and is currently teaching at Heald College in Sacramento, California.
