= Embassy of the United States, Bangkok =

Diplomatic mission representing the US in Thailand

Embassy of the United States, Bangkok สถานเอกอัครราชทูตสหรัฐอเมริกาประจำประเทศไทย

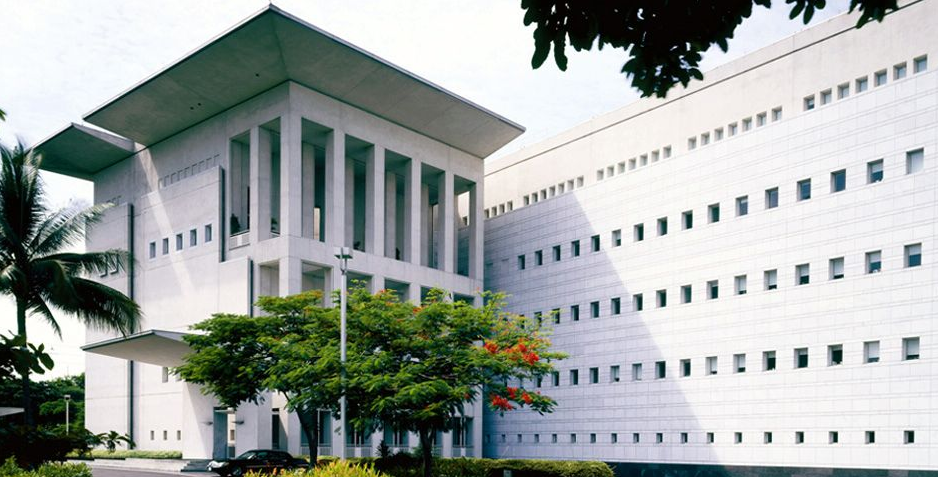
- Location: Bangkok, Thailand
- Address: 95 Witthayu Road, Pathum Wan District, Bangkok
- Coordinates: 13°44′10.2″N 100°32′47.2″E
- Opened: 1947
- Ambassador: Sean O'Neill (diplomat)
- Chargé d'affaires: Michael Heath
- Website: Bangkok Embassy

The Embassy of the United States in Bangkok (Thai: สถานเอกอัครราชทูตสหรัฐอเมริกาประจำประเทศไทย) is the diplomatic mission representing the United States in Thailand. At 11 acres, the embassy is the fourth largest US diplomatic mission, after Baghdad, Yerevan, and Beijing. Sean O'Neill is the current US Ambassador to Thailand, serving since November 2025.

== History ==
During the years 1832–6, Diplomat Edmund Roberts was appointed by President Andrew Jackson as America's first envoy to the Far East, and served on two consecutive non-resident embassies aboard the U. S. Navy sloop-of-war Peacock to the court of King Nangklao (Rama III of the Kings of Thailand.) Roberts negotiated the Treaty of Amity and Commerce between Siam and the United States of 1833 and returned in 1836 to exchange ratifications. The Roberts treaty, with subsequent modifications, is still in force. Roberts also negotiated a treaty and exchanged ratifications with the Sultan of Oman. In 2008, Roberts was lauded as the "first Deputy U.S. Trade Representative for Asia – and a fine one at that."

The first diplomatic property for the US in Thailand was gifted by the monarchy in 1896. At the time, it was one of the few diplomatic properties owned abroad in the United States, with most diplomats having to fund their accommodation themselves. The current ambassadorial residence was built by the English businessman Henry Victor Bailey in 1914. After his death in 1920, this house was sold to the Thai finance ministry. After WWII, Great Britain sought to punish Thailand for having aided Japan, but the U.S. hindered their efforts. For this, the Thai government thanked the U.S. with the house in 1947 and it has been used as the official residence ever since.

In 1975 a large scale protest, of about 10,000 students, took place outside the embassy when Thai air bases were used by the U.S. Air Force to launch attacks against Cambodia during the seizure of SS Mayaguez, without the permission of the government of Thailand and without informing the embassy.

There were two major events in the 20th century between the two nations. One is the Treaty of Amity and Economic Relations which facilitates U.S. and Thai companies' economic access to one another's markets. Other important agreements address civil uses of atomic energy, sales of agricultural commodities, investment guarantees, and finally military and economic assistance. The other is a Free Trade Agreement between the two nations that was proposed in 2004.

Since the military coup of May 2014, relationships between Thailand and the United States have experienced strains, with several ultra-nationalist demonstrations in front of the U.S. Embassy on Witthayu Road, and even charges alleged against the U.S. ambassador for lese majeste. The U.S. trimmed military aid to Thailand, the latter which has been courting closer relationships with China and Russia.

== Embassy complex ==
The current embassy compound was completed in 1996, and at the time was the second largest US diplomatic mission after the US Embassy, Cairo.

A $625 million New Office Annex (NOX) building broke ground in August 2021, scheduled for completion by 2025. Designed by New York firm SHoP Architects, the NOX will be built to LEED Silver Certification and incorporate traditional Thai architectural elements.

== See also ==
- List of ambassadors of the United States to Thailand
- Thailand–United States relations
