= Kenneth Todd Young =

American diplomat (1916–1972)

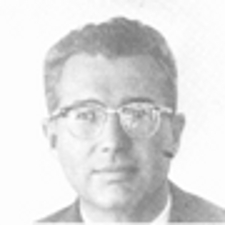
Kenneth Todd Young

Kenneth Todd Young (1916 – August 29, 1972) was a former United States Ambassador to Thailand (1961–1963) and former president of the Asia Society. A resident of Larchmont, New York, Young died of a heart attack in Washington, DC at the age of 56.

== Biography ==
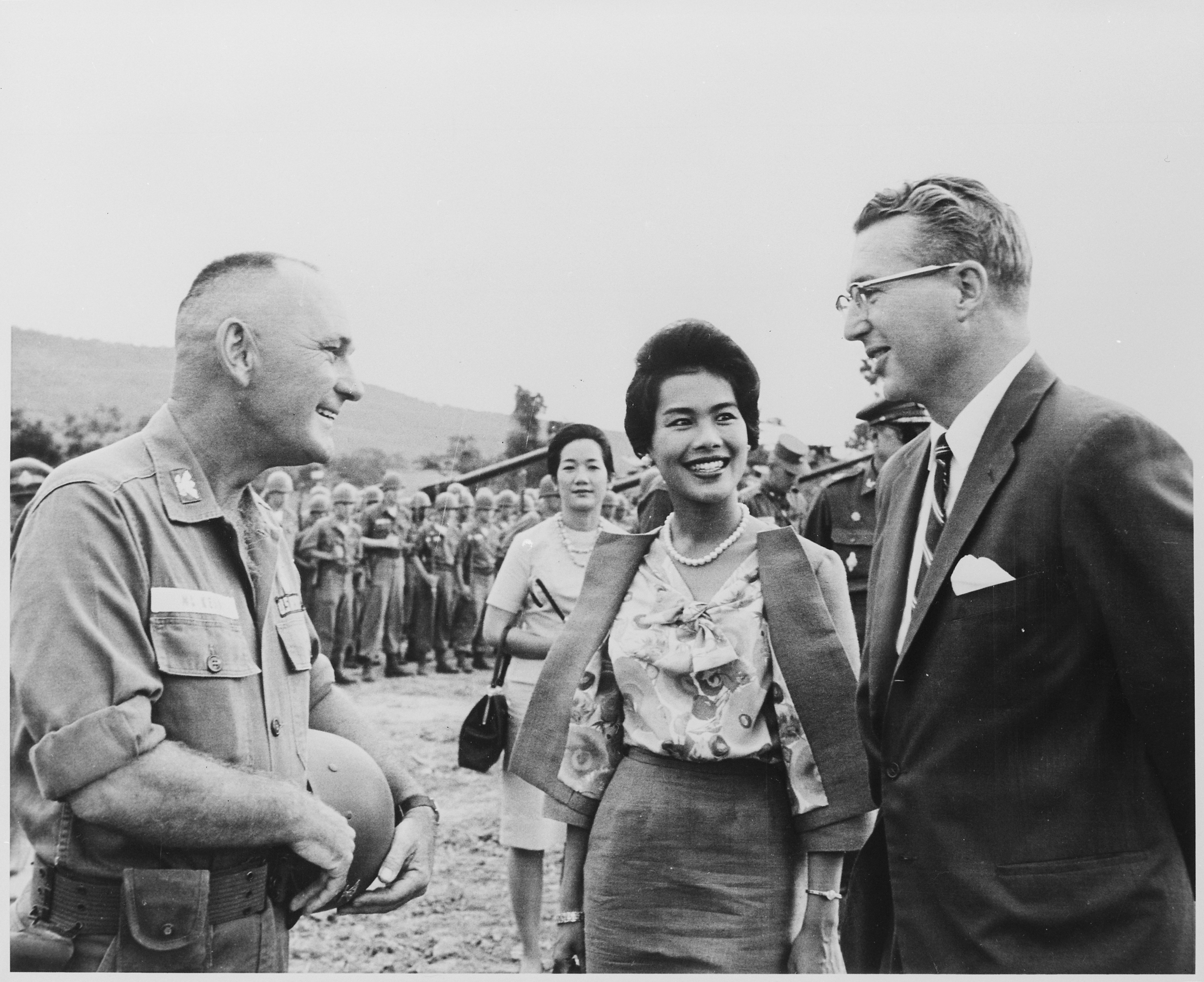
King Bhumibol and Queen Sirikit of Thailand visited the U.S. Army's 27th Infantry "Wolfhounds" near Korat, Thailand in 1962. Here, Queen Sirikit visited with Colonel William A. Mckean, Commander of the 27th, and U.S. Ambassador to Thailand, Kenneth Todd Young. The U.S. forces in Thailand were used to assist as instructors and advisors.

Young's ancestors were from “an old Maine family” but Young was born in Canada. He attended Lingnan University in China from 1934 until 1935 after graduating from the Middlesex School and starting at Harvard College. Young was actively involved with Harvard University. Young graduated with an A.B. in 1939 and A.M. in 1942. He was a trustee of the Harvard-Yenching Institute and member of the Visiting Committee, Harvard Department of Far Eastern Languages.

In 1943, he married Patricia Morris, a Vassar alumna, daughter of George Maurice Morris, a president of the American Bar Association. Young was a teaching fellow at Harvard and served in the Air Force before joining the State Department in 1946 as a political intelligence officer in 1946. He was a director of the Office of Southeast Asian Affairs from 1956 to 1958. For three years, Young worked for the Standard Vacuum Oil Company before President John F. Kennedy named him Ambassador to Bangkok.

The Kenneth T. Young Professorship of Sino-Vietnamese History was established at Harvard University in 1973 in his honor.
