= List of Joe Biden 2024 presidential campaign endorsements =

This is a list of notable individuals and organizations who endorsed Joe Biden's 2024 presidential campaign for the Democratic Party nomination. On July 21, 2024, Joe Biden dropped out of the race and endorsed Vice President Kamala Harris's 2024 presidential campaign.

== Federal executive officials ==
Barack Obama

Bill Clinton

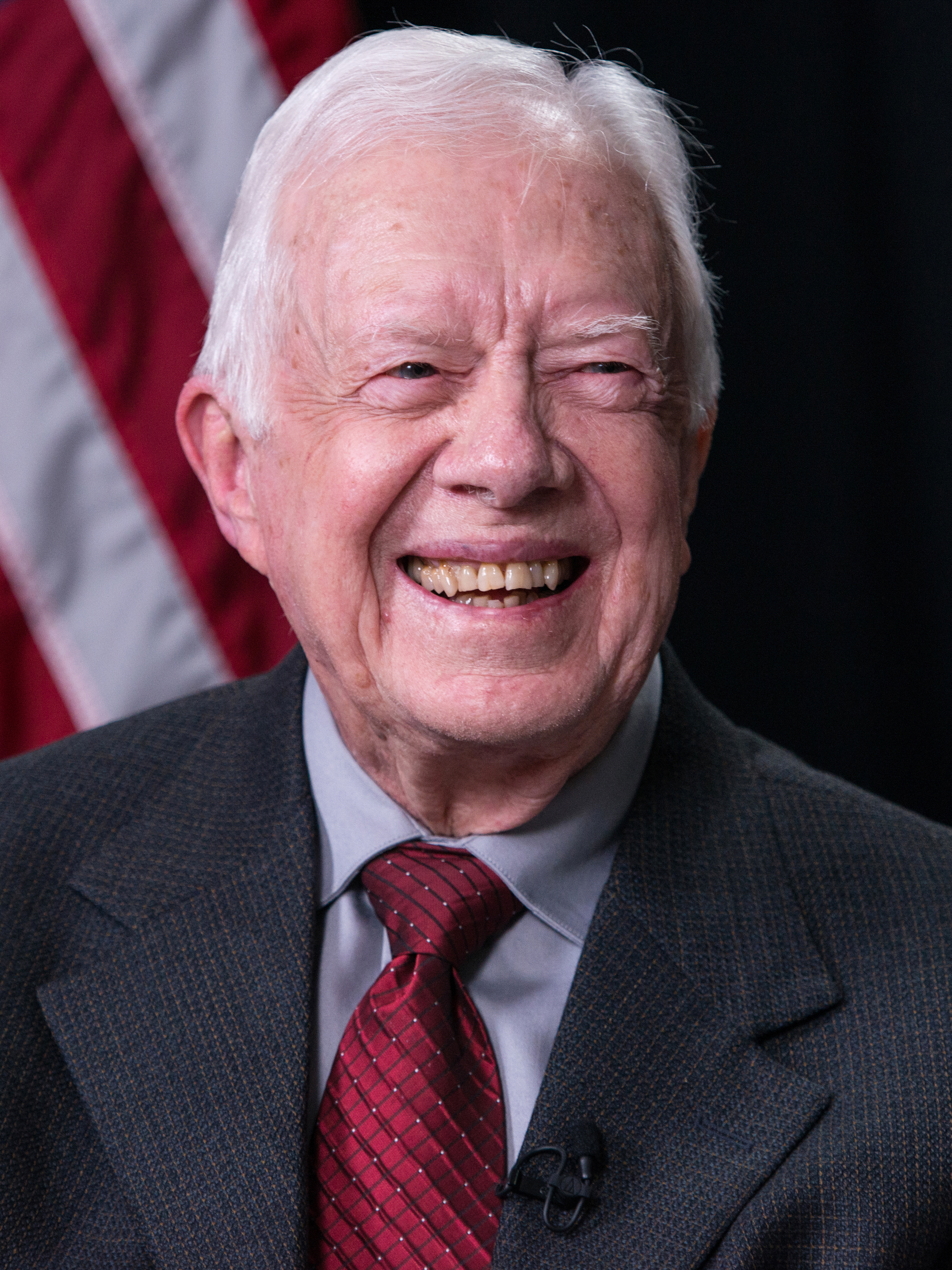
Jimmy Carter

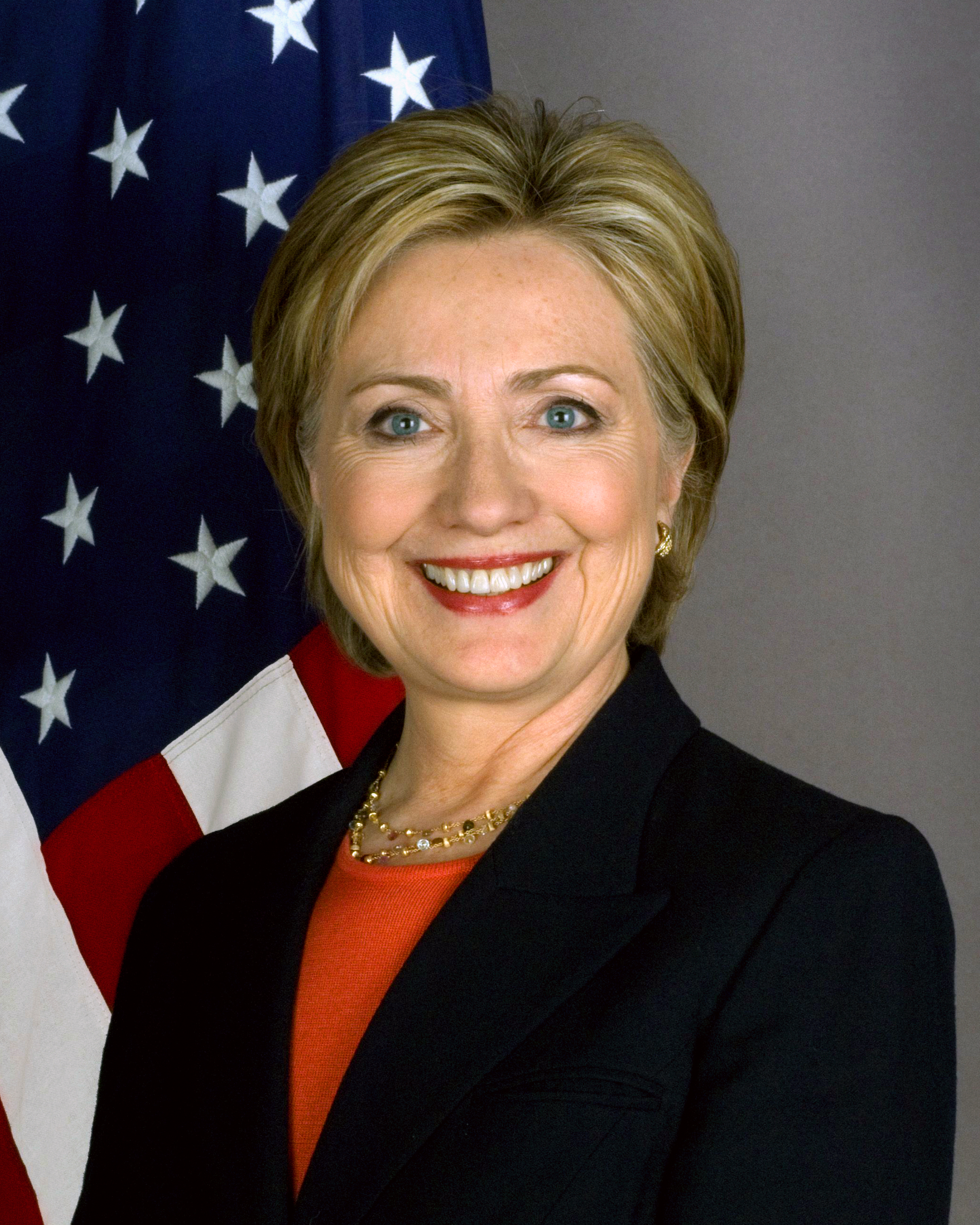
Hillary Clinton

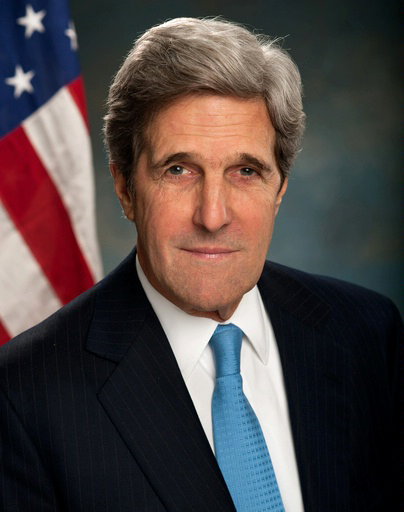
John Kerry

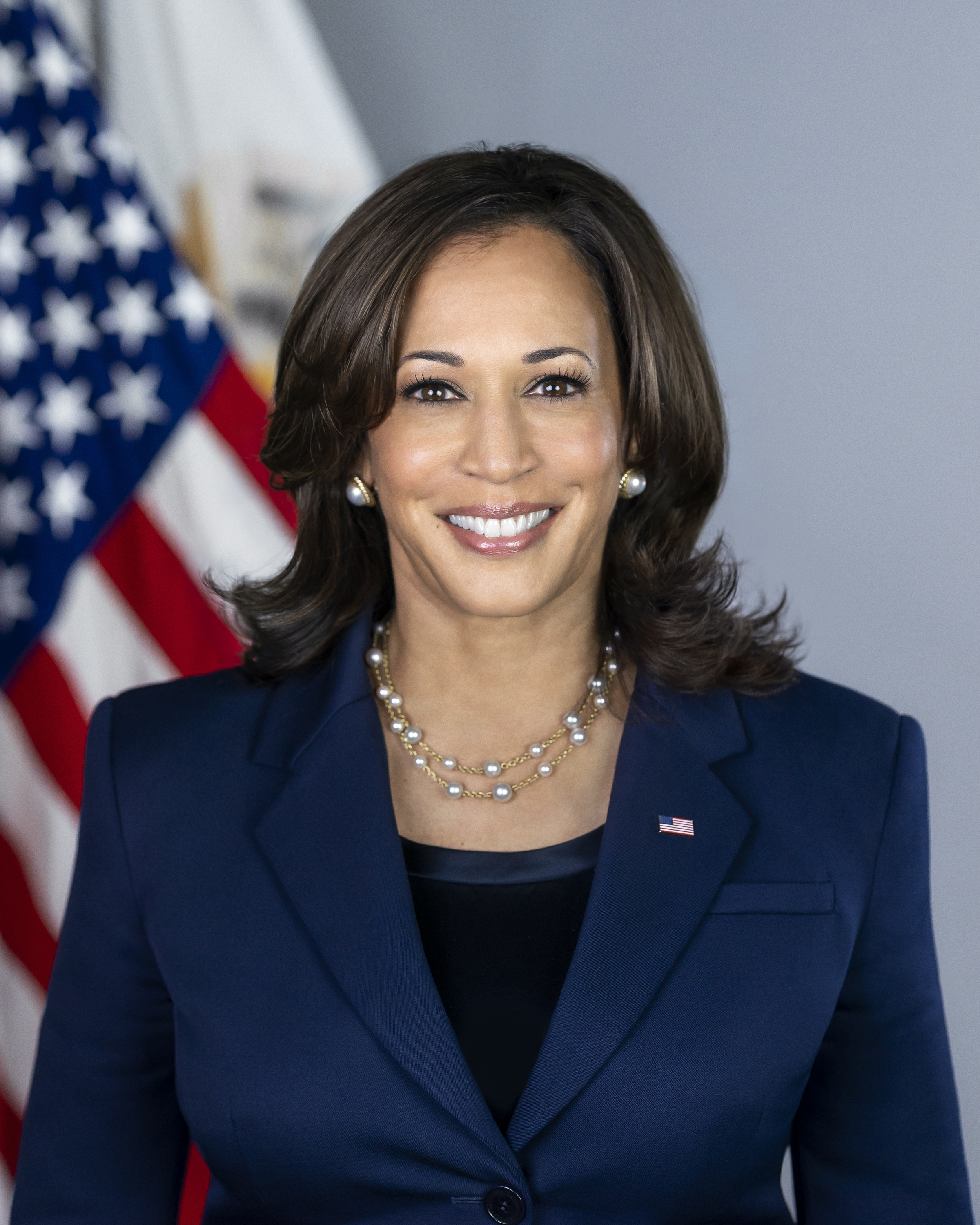
Kamala Harris

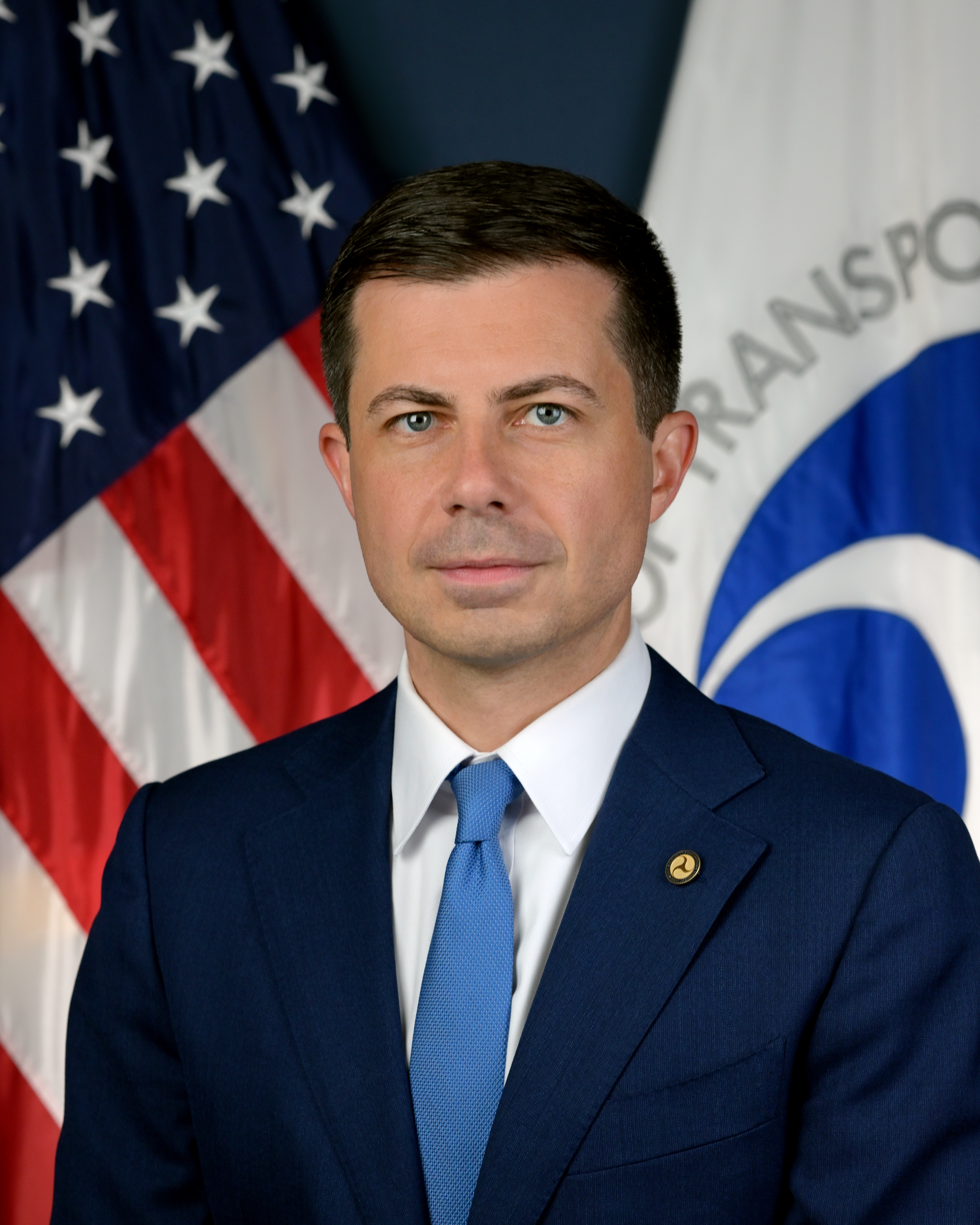
Pete Buttigieg

Note: Political activity by current executive branch officials (other than the president and vice president) faces some restrictions under the Hatch Act.

=== Presidents ===
- Jimmy Carter, president of the United States (1977–1981), governor of Georgia (1971–1975)
- Bill Clinton, president of the United States (1993–2001), governor of Arkansas (1979–1981, 1983–1992), Attorney General of Arkansas (1977–1979)
- Barack Obama, president of the United States (2009–2017), under whom Biden served as vice president; U.S. senator from Illinois (2005–2008); Illinois state senator from District 13 (1997–2004)

=== Vice presidents ===
- Kamala Harris, vice president of the United States (2021–2025) – Biden's vice president and running mate; U.S. senator from California (2017–2021); Attorney General of California (2011–2017); District Attorney of San Francisco (2004–2011)

=== Cabinet-level officials ===
- Pete Buttigieg, U.S. Secretary of Transportation (2021–2025); mayor of South Bend, Indiana (2012–2020)

==== Former ====
- Hillary Clinton, U.S. Secretary of State (2009–2013); U.S. senator from New York (2001–2009); First Lady of the United States (1993–2001); First Lady of Arkansas (1979–1981 and 1983–1992); chancellor of Queen's University Belfast (2020–present); Democratic nominee for U.S. president in 2016
- Chuck Hagel, United States Secretary of Defense (2013–2015), co-chair of President's Intelligence Advisory Board (2009–2013), U.S. senator from Nebraska (1997–2009) (Republican)
- John Kerry, U.S. Special Presidential Envoy for Climate (2021–2025); U.S. Secretary of State (2013–2017); U.S. senator from Massachusetts (1985–2013); lieutenant governor of Massachusetts (1983–1985); Democratic nominee for U.S. president in 2004
- Sarah Matthews, Deputy White House Press Secretary (2020–2021) (Republican, previously endorsed Nikki Haley)
- Tom Perez, U.S. Secretary of Labor (2013–2017); chair of the Democratic National Committee (2017–2021)
- Robert Reich, U.S. Secretary of Labor (1993–1997)
- ~~Anthony Scaramucci, White House Communications Director (2017) (Republican, previously endorsed Chris Christie)~~ (called on Biden to withdraw)
- Hilda Solis, (Note: Biden-Harris Campaign National Advisory Board member) U.S. Secretary of Labor (2009–2013); U.S. representative from CA-32 (2001–2009); Los Angeles County Supervisor from District 1 (2014–present)

=== U.S. ambassadors ===
- Caroline Kennedy, United States Ambassador to Australia (2022–2024), United States Ambassador to Japan (2013–2017)
- Joe Kennedy III, United States Special Envoy for Northern Ireland (2022–2024), U.S. representative from MA-04 (2013–2021)
- Victoria Reggie Kennedy, United States Ambassador to Austria (2022–2025)

==== Former ====
- James Costos, United States Ambassador to Spain (2013–2017), United States Ambassador to Andorra (2014–2017)

=== Other administrative officials ===
- James Comey, Director of the Federal Bureau of Investigation (2013–2017), United States Deputy Attorney General (2003–2005), United States Attorney for the Southern District of New York (2002–2003) (Independent)
- Maggie Goodlander, Deputy Assistant Attorney General for the Antitrust Division (2021–2024)
- Patrick Murphy, United States Under Secretary of the Army (2016–2017), United States Secretary of the Army (2016), U.S. representative for PA-08 (2007–2011)

== U.S. senators ==
=== Current ===
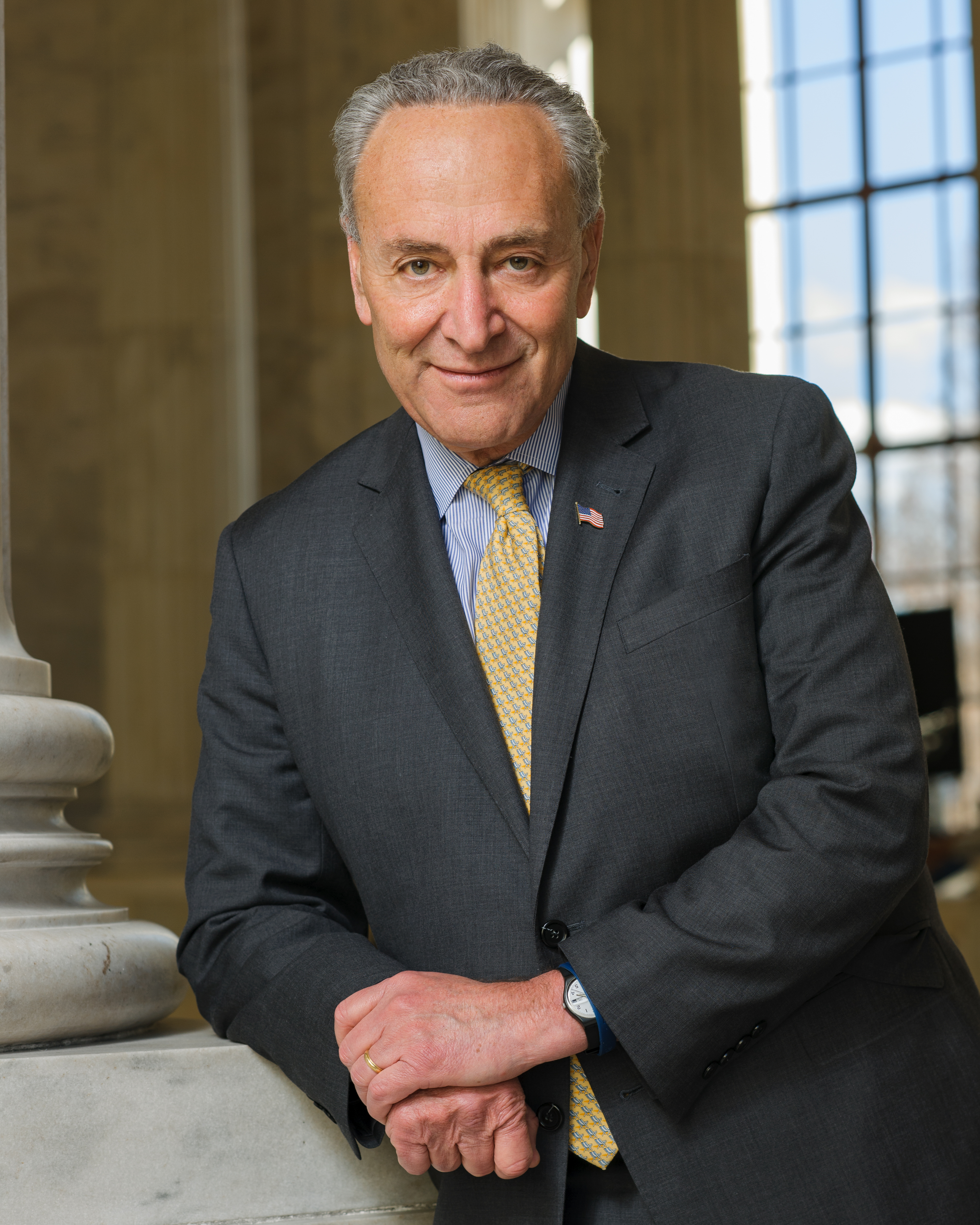
Chuck Schumer

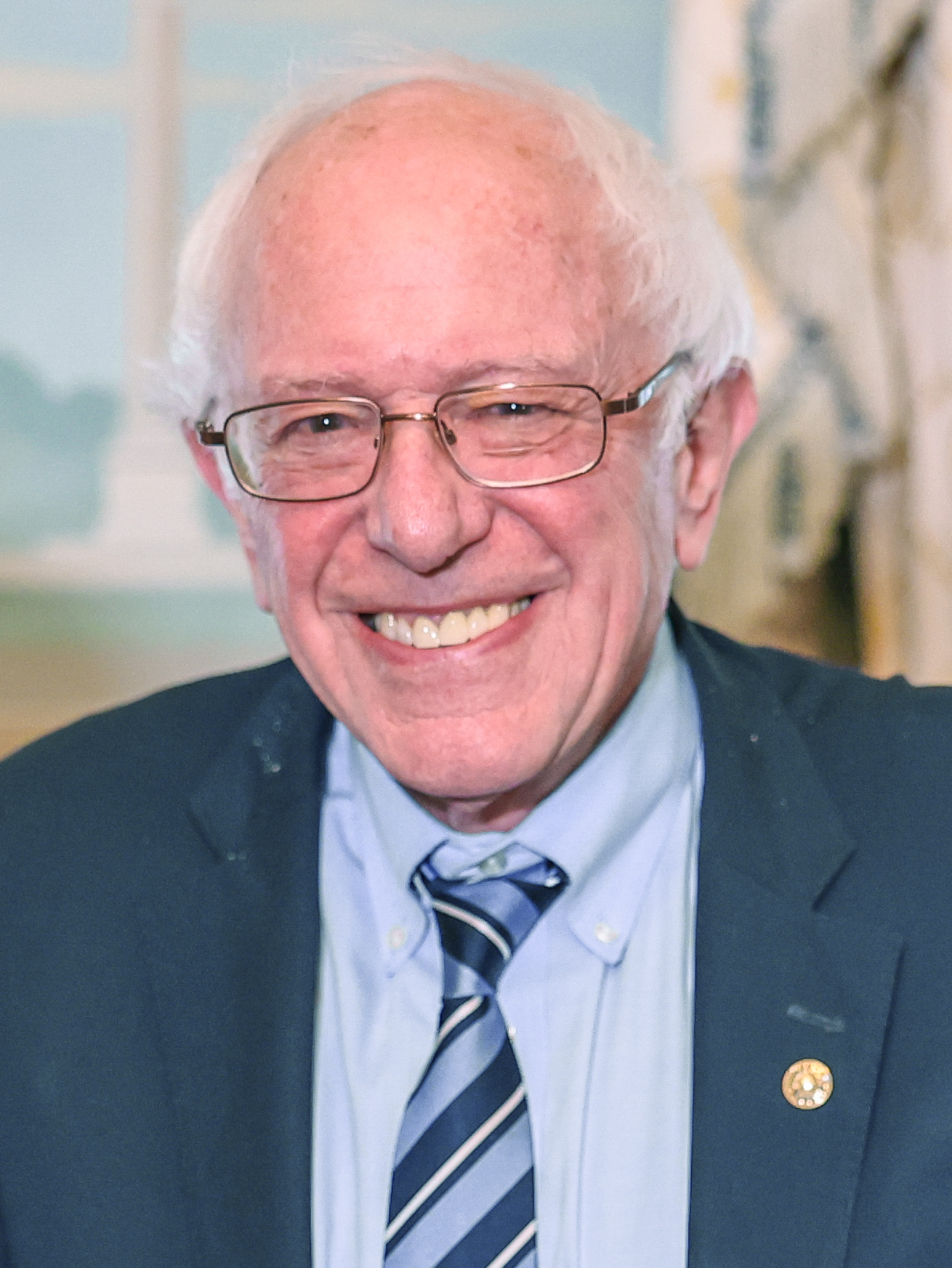
Bernie Sanders

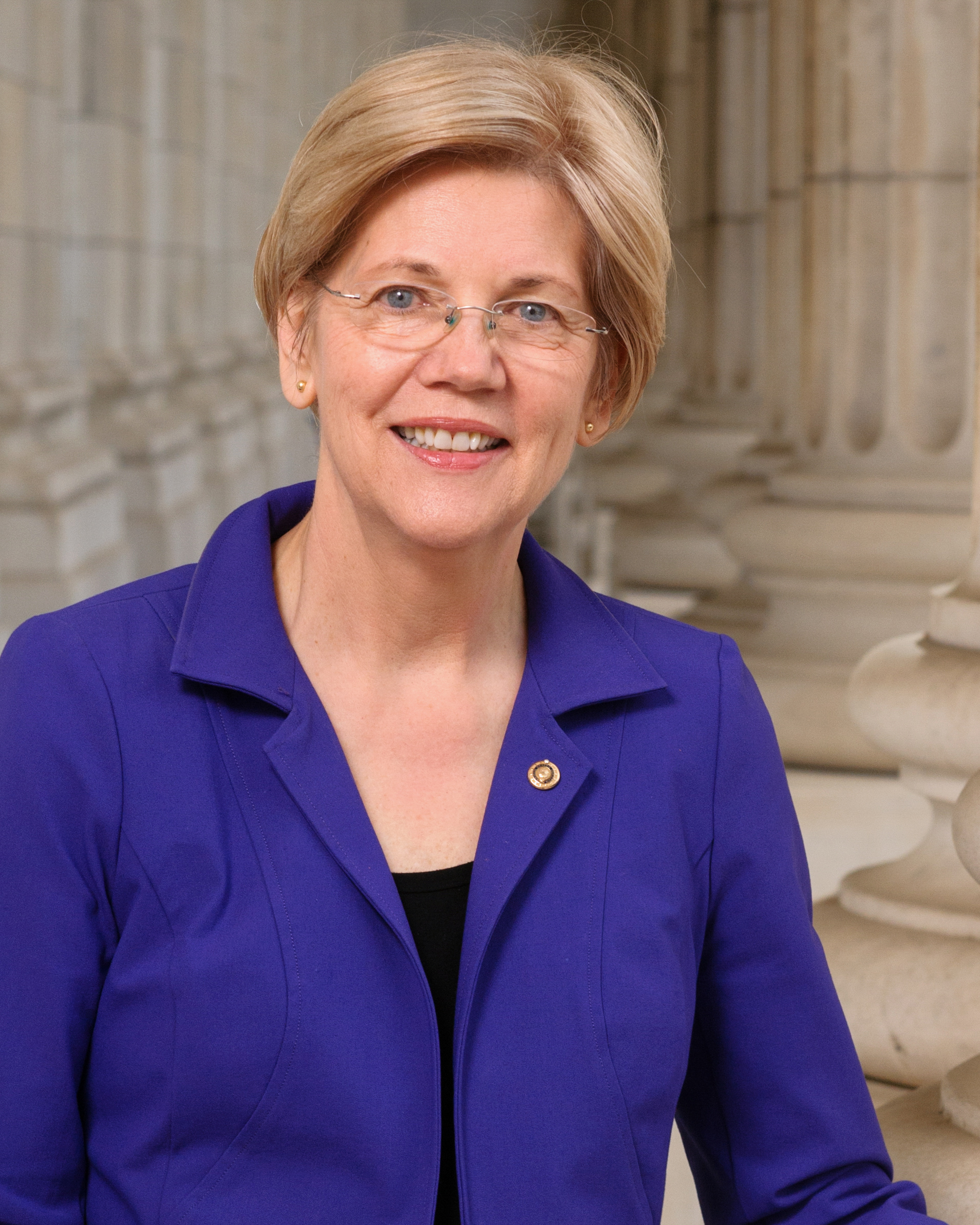
Elizabeth Warren

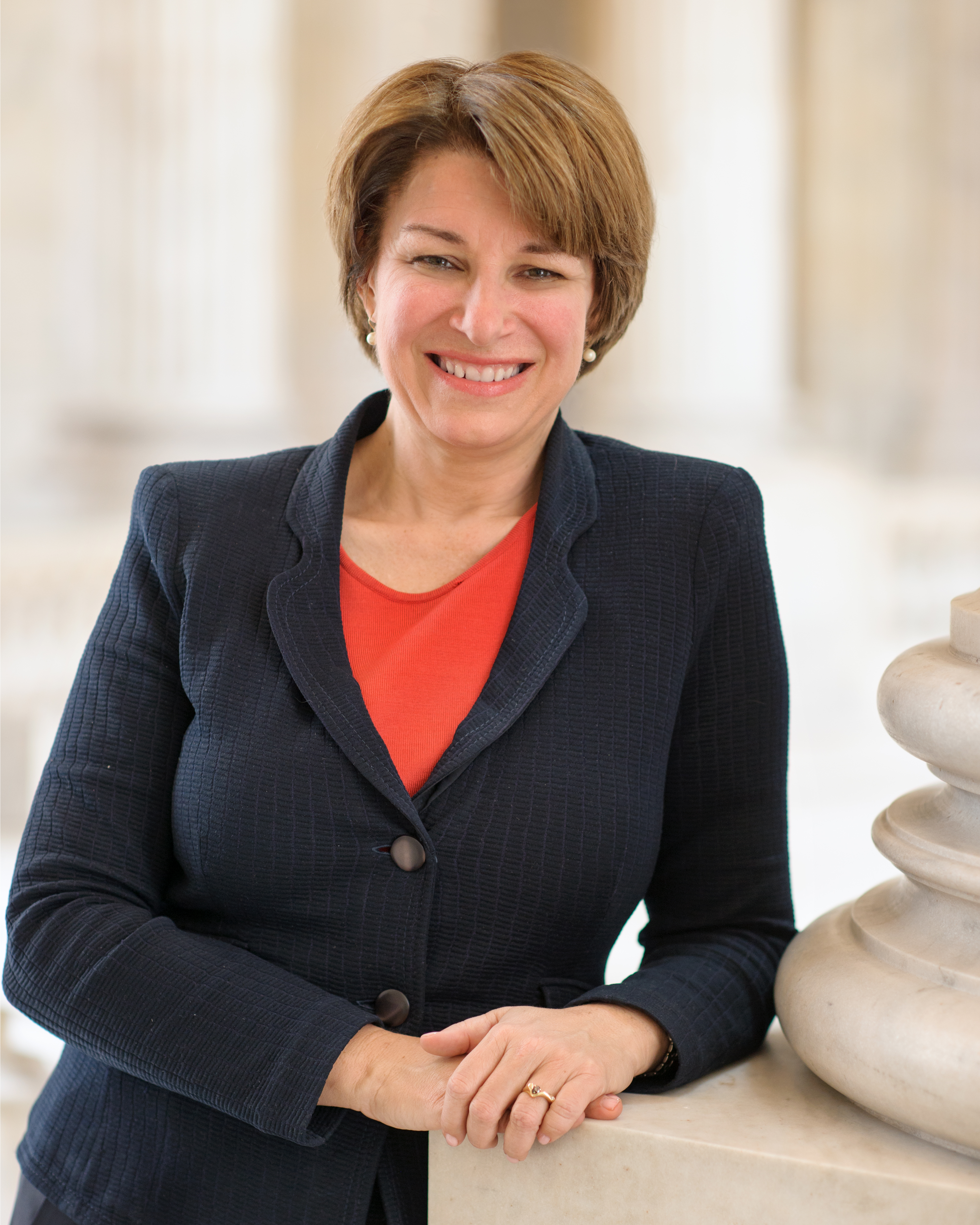
Amy Klobuchar

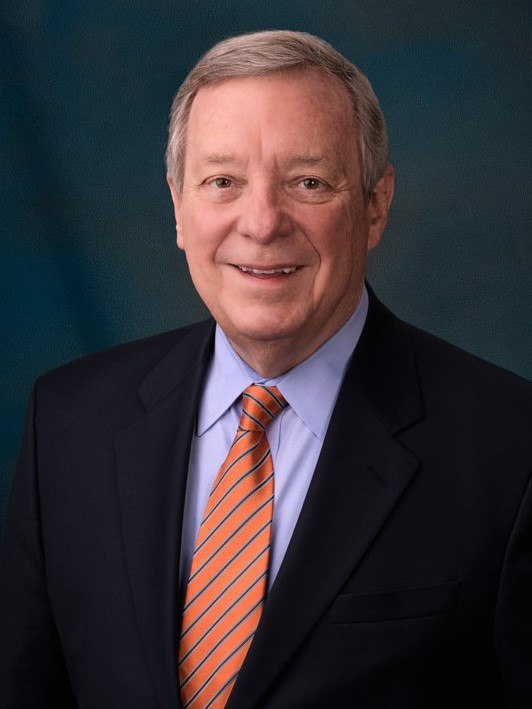
Dick Durbin

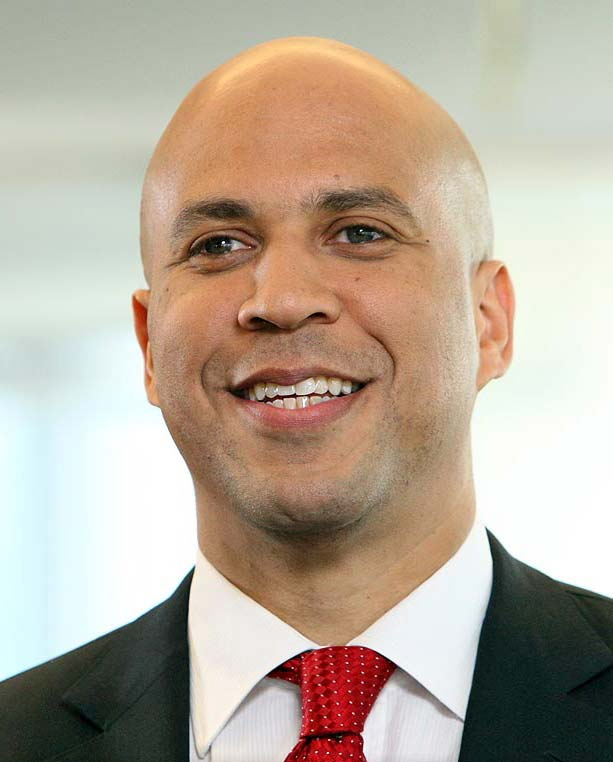
Cory Booker

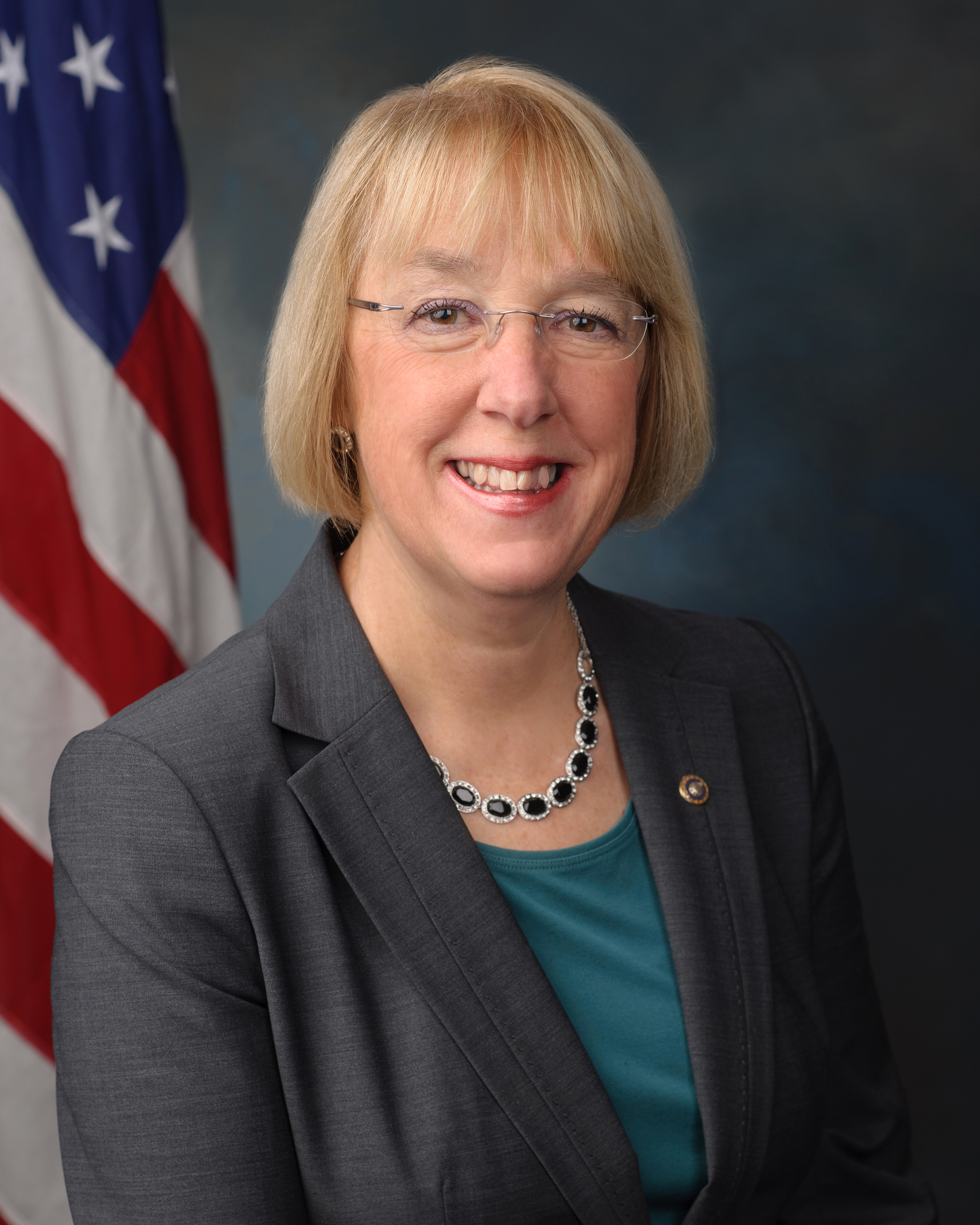
Patty Murray

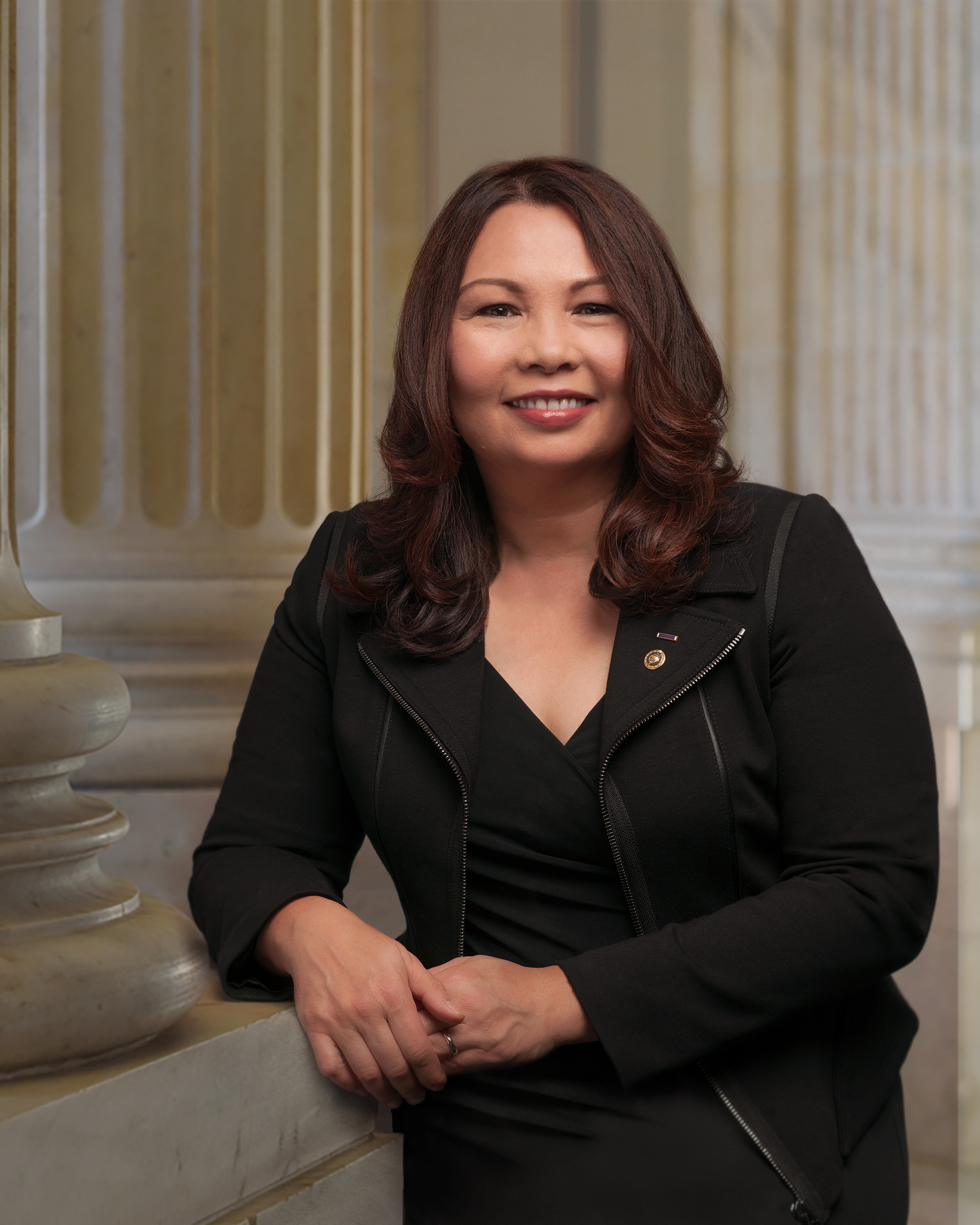
Tammy Duckworth

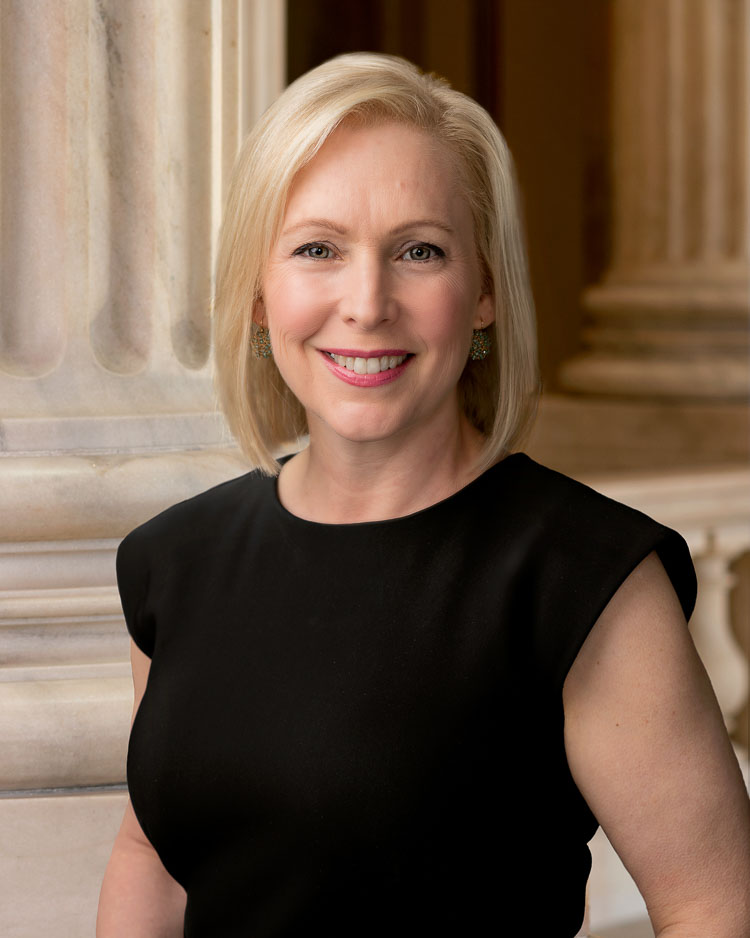
Kirsten Gillibrand

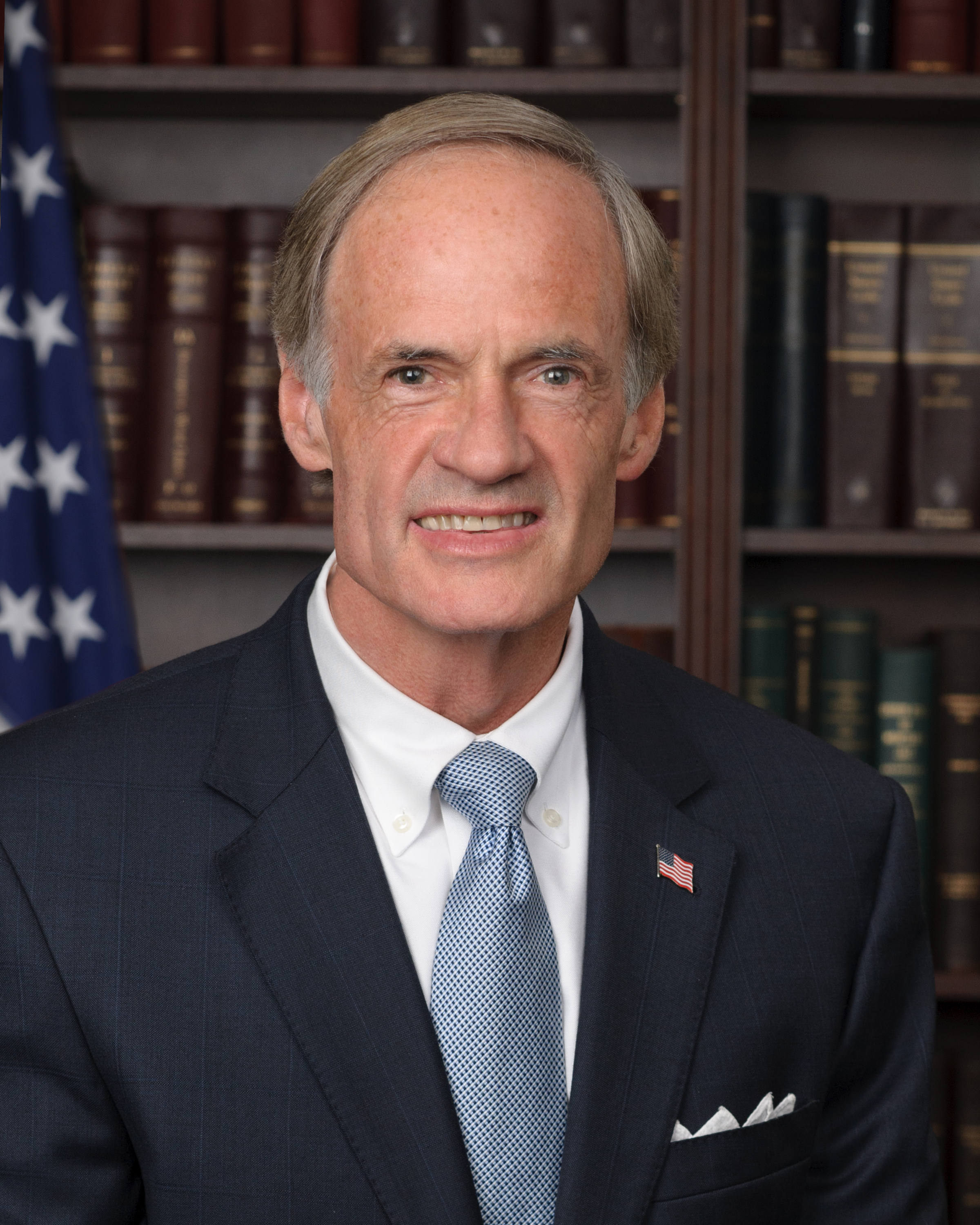
Tom Carper

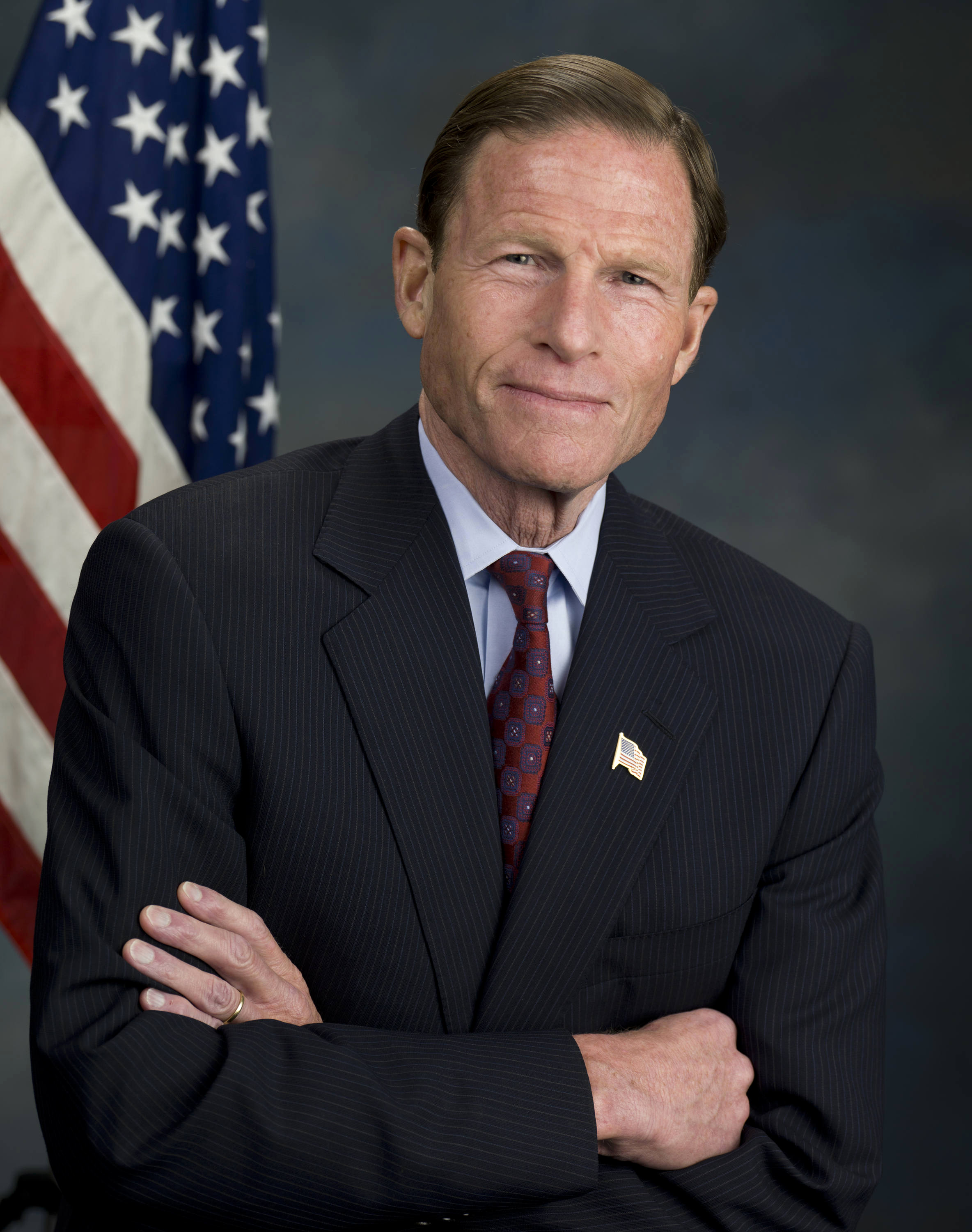
Richard Blumenthal

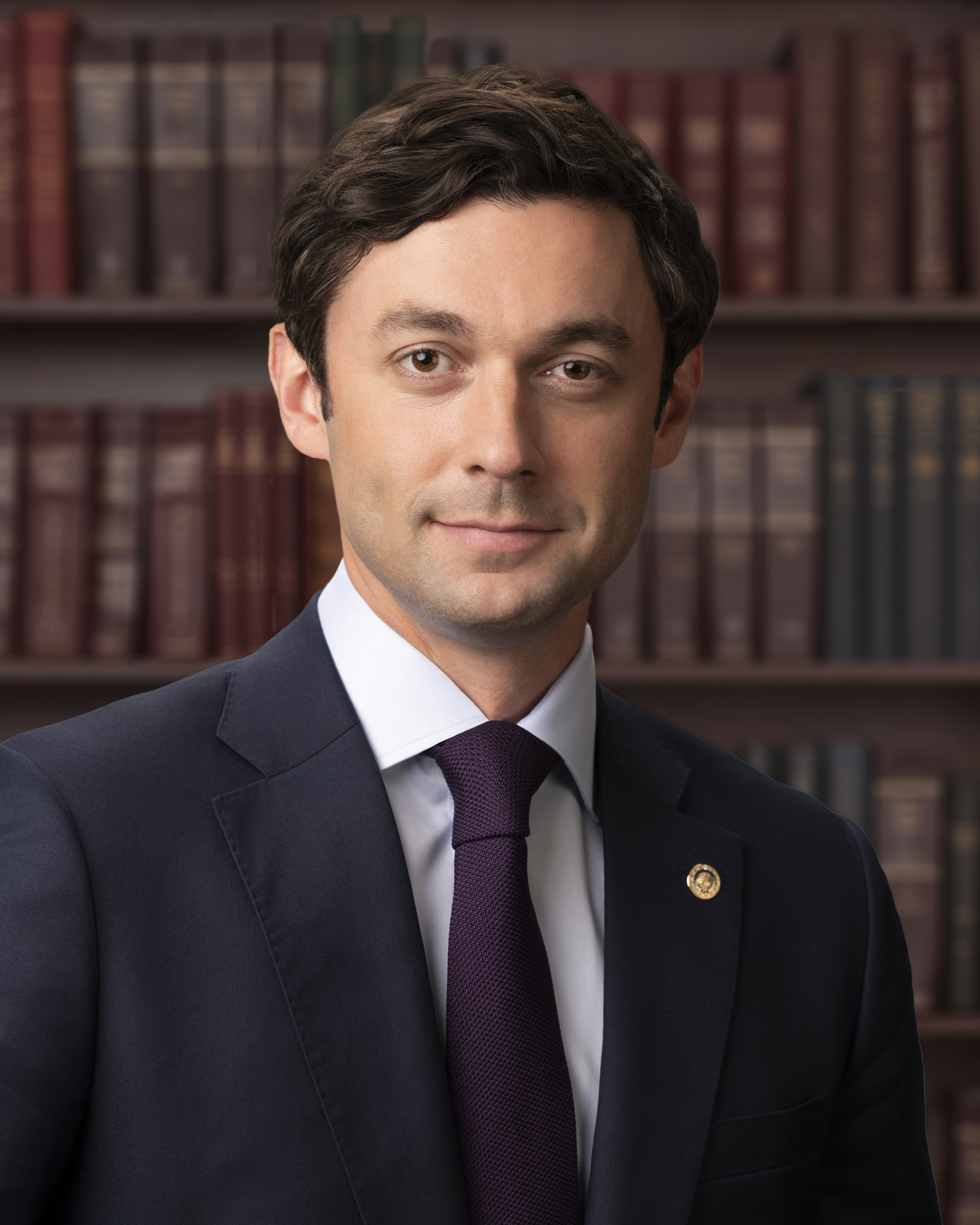
Jon Ossoff

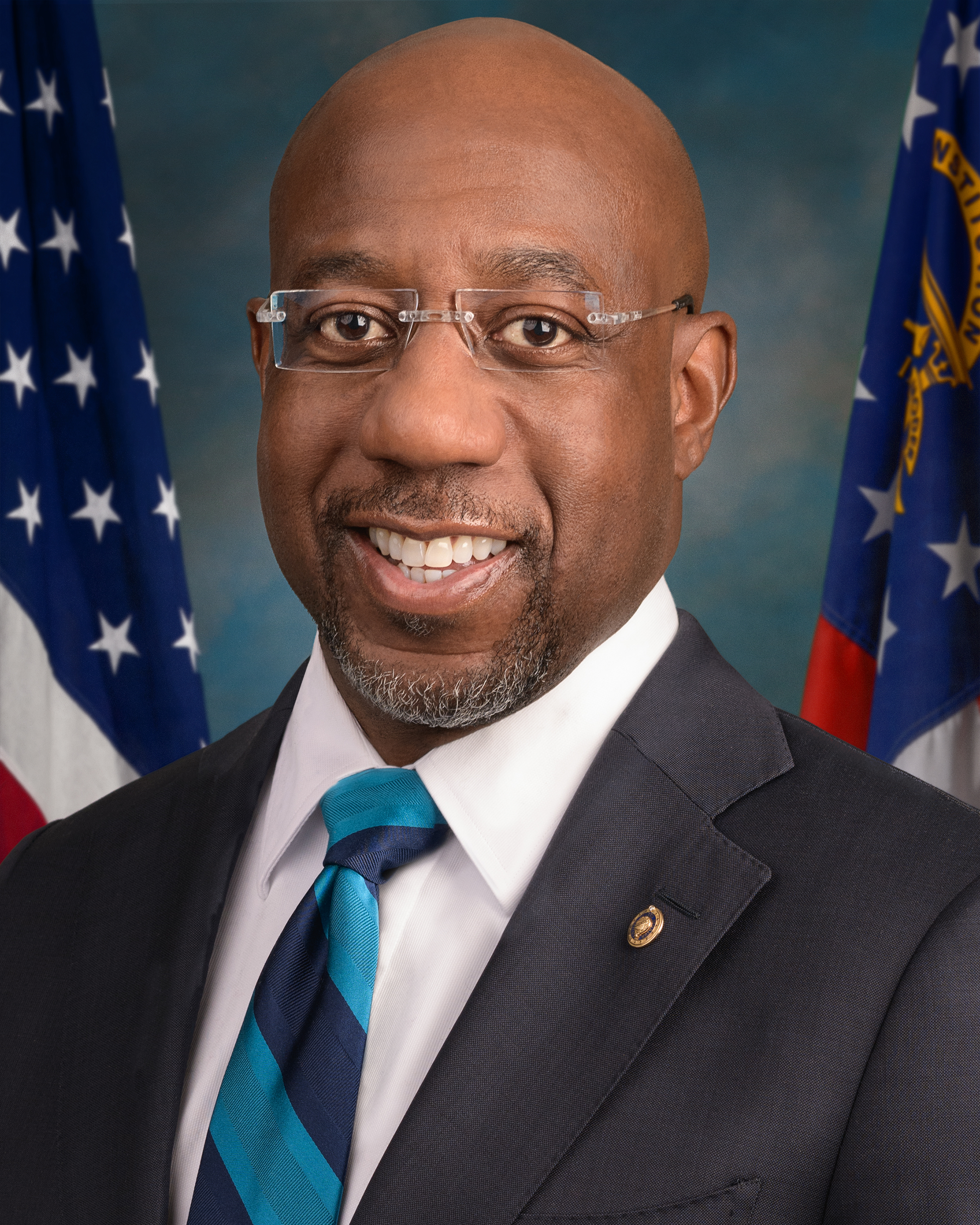
Raphael Warnock

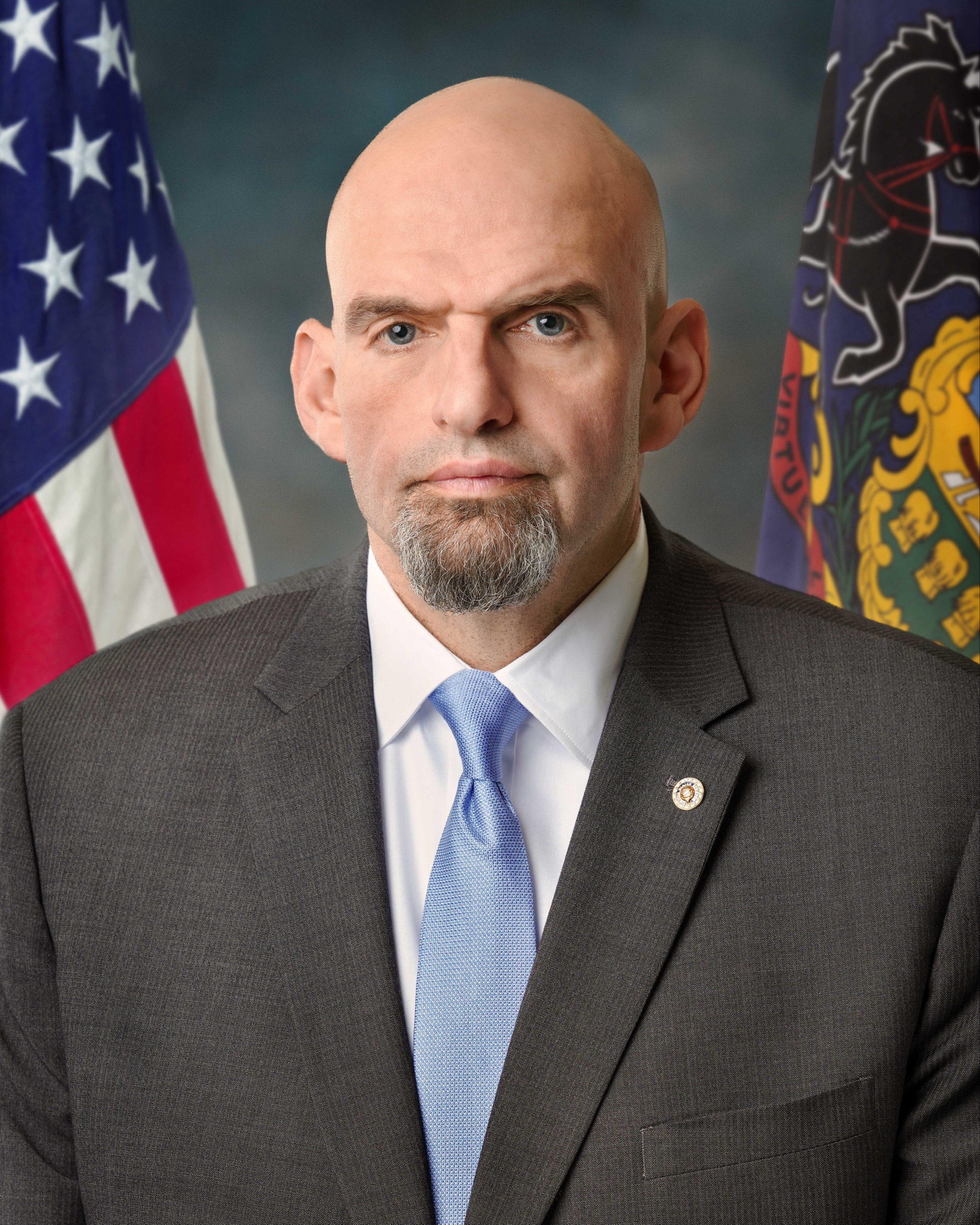
John Fetterman

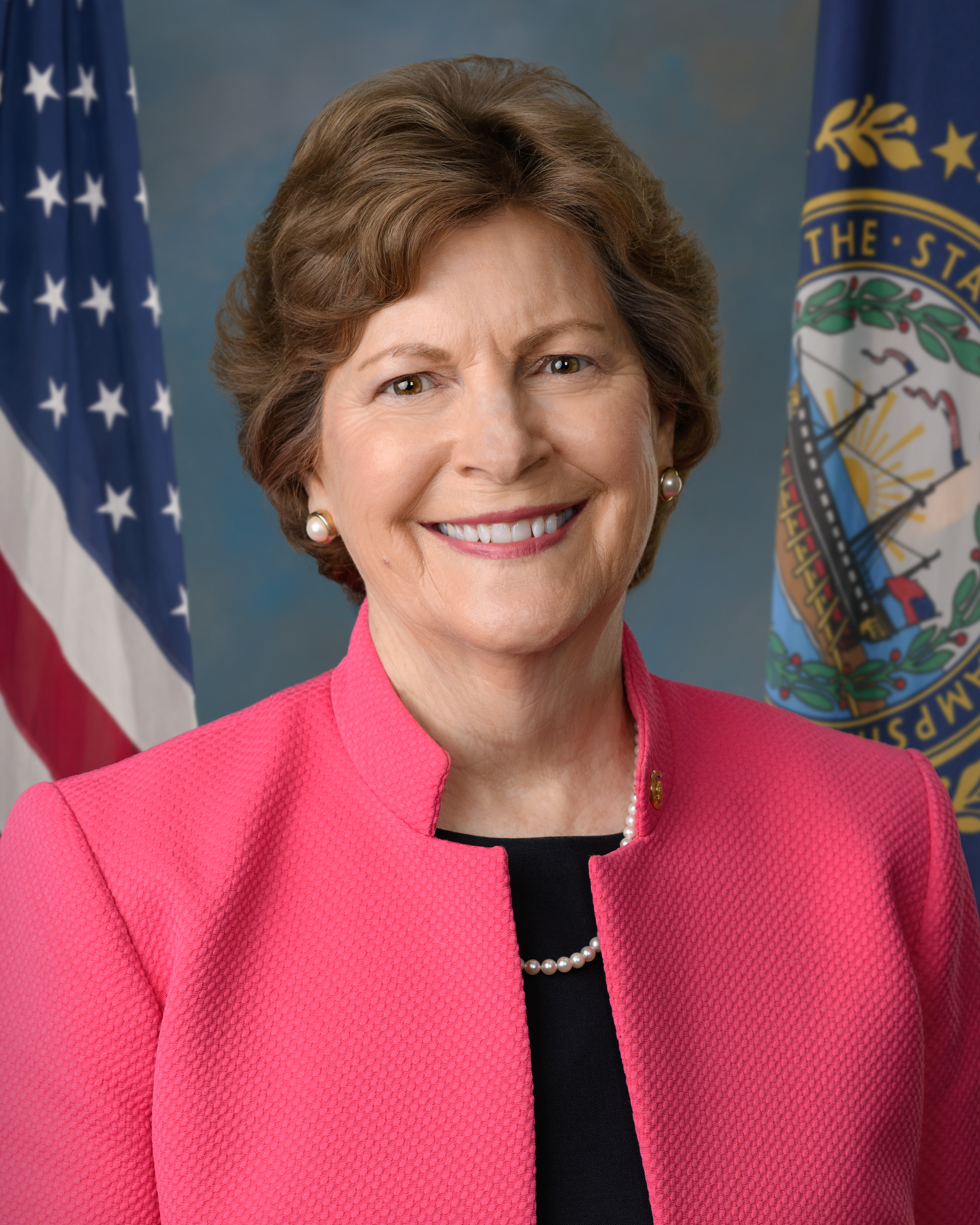
Jeanne Shaheen

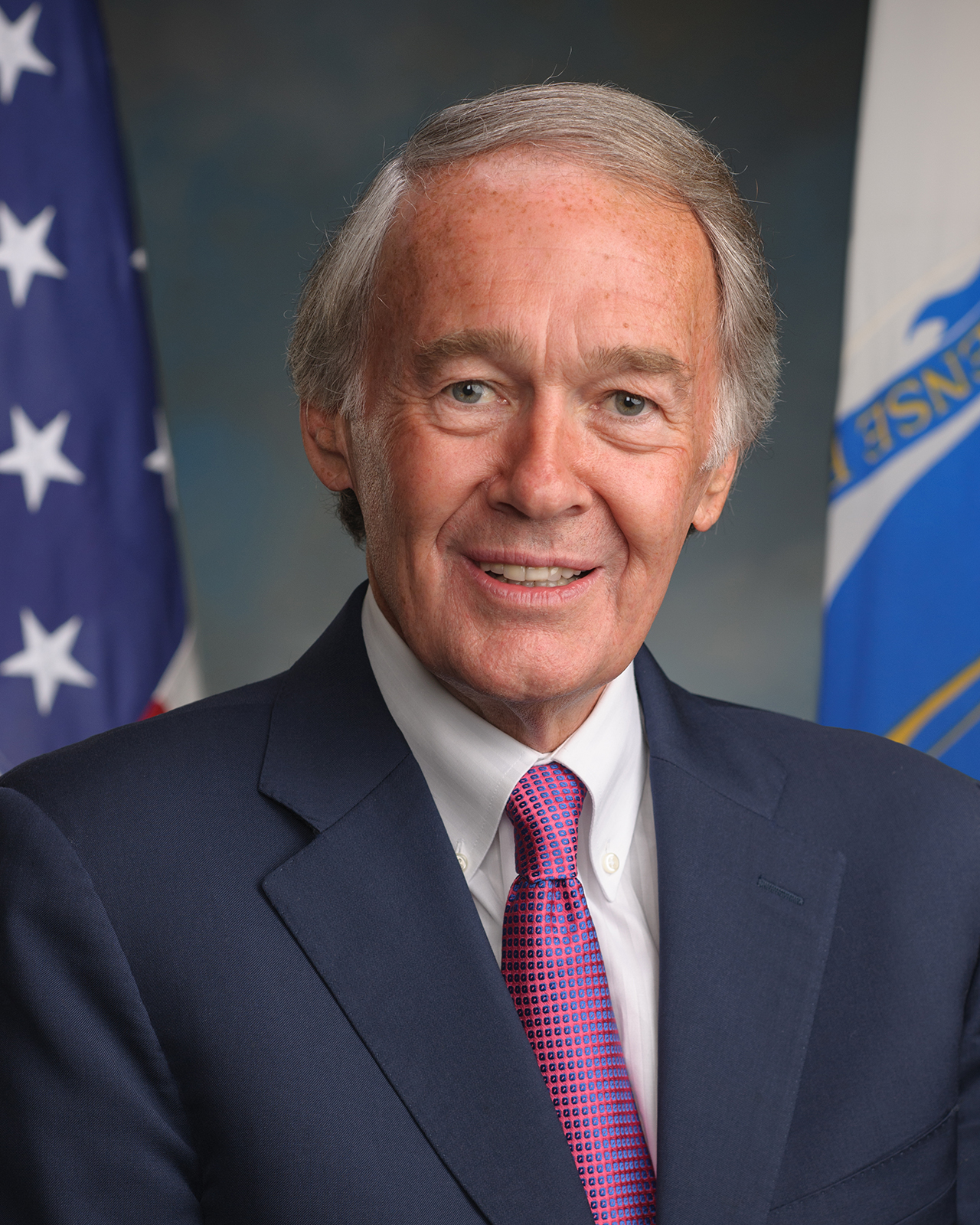
Ed Markey

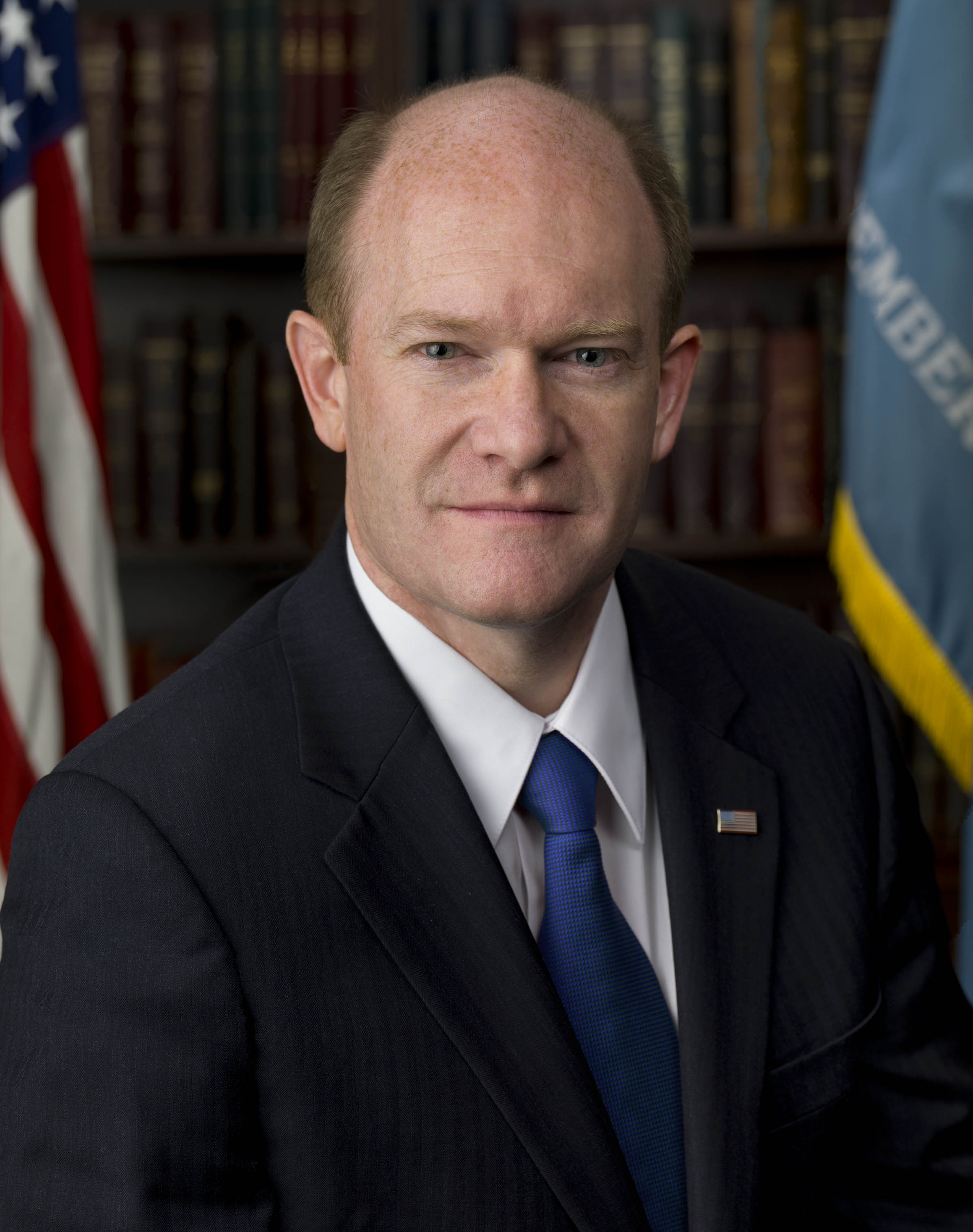
Chris Coons

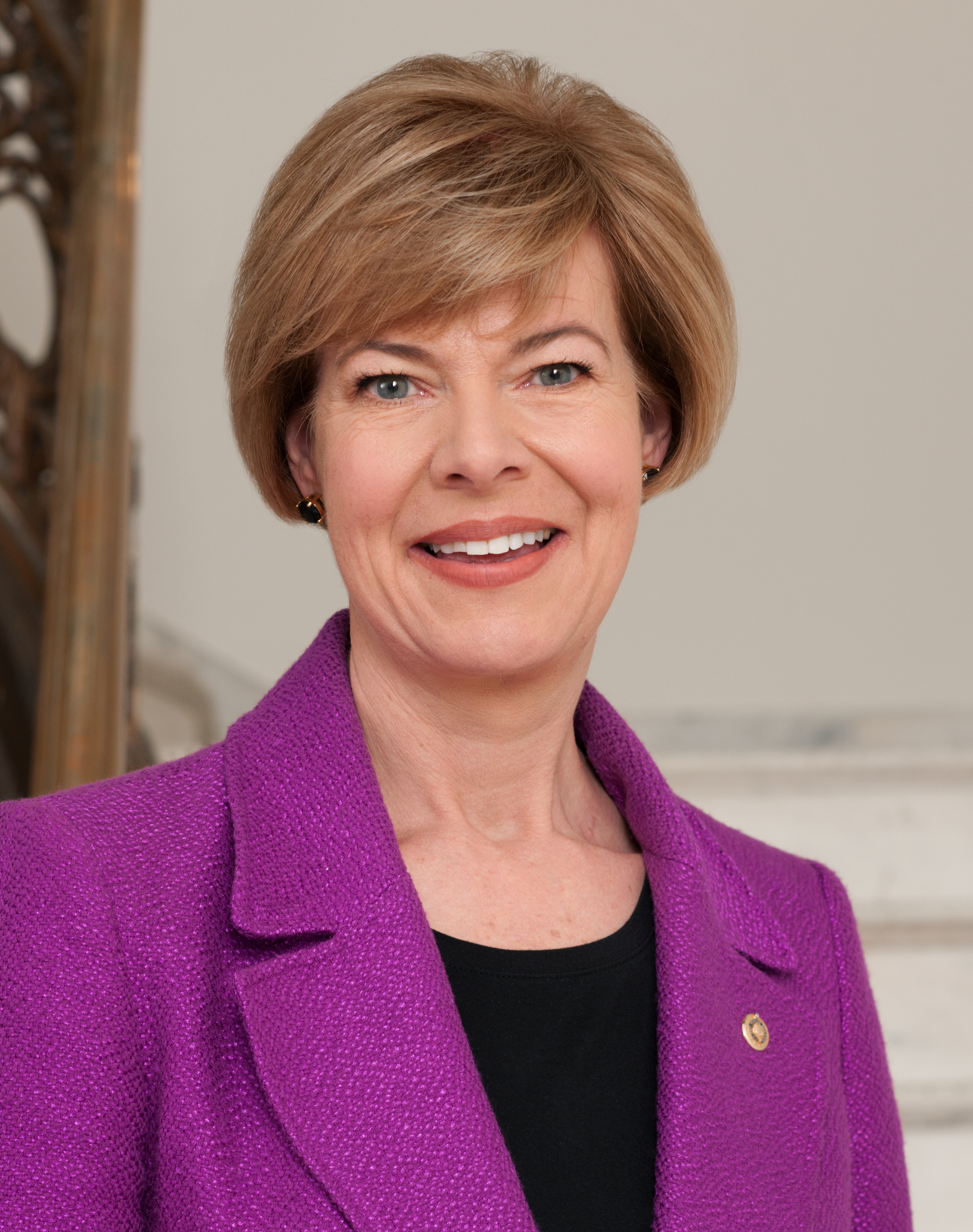
Tammy Baldwin

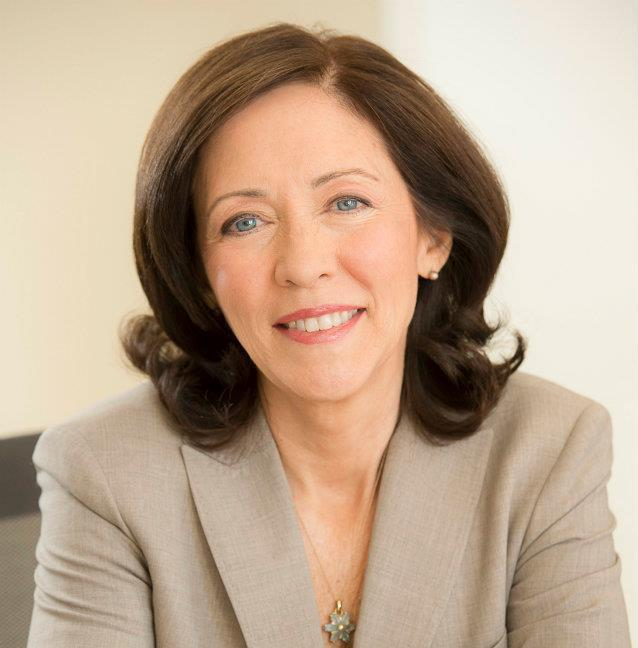
Maria Cantwell

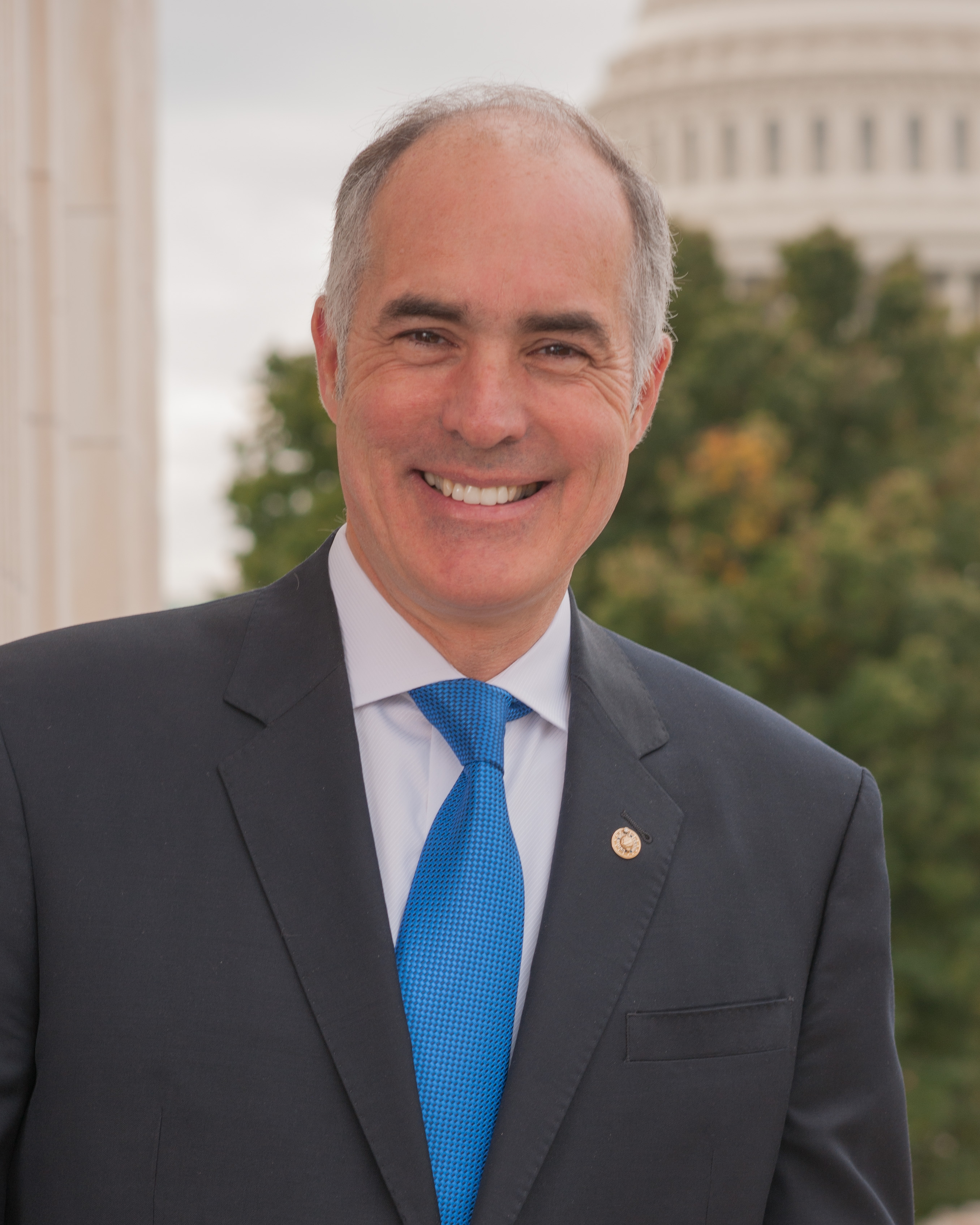
Bob Casey Jr.

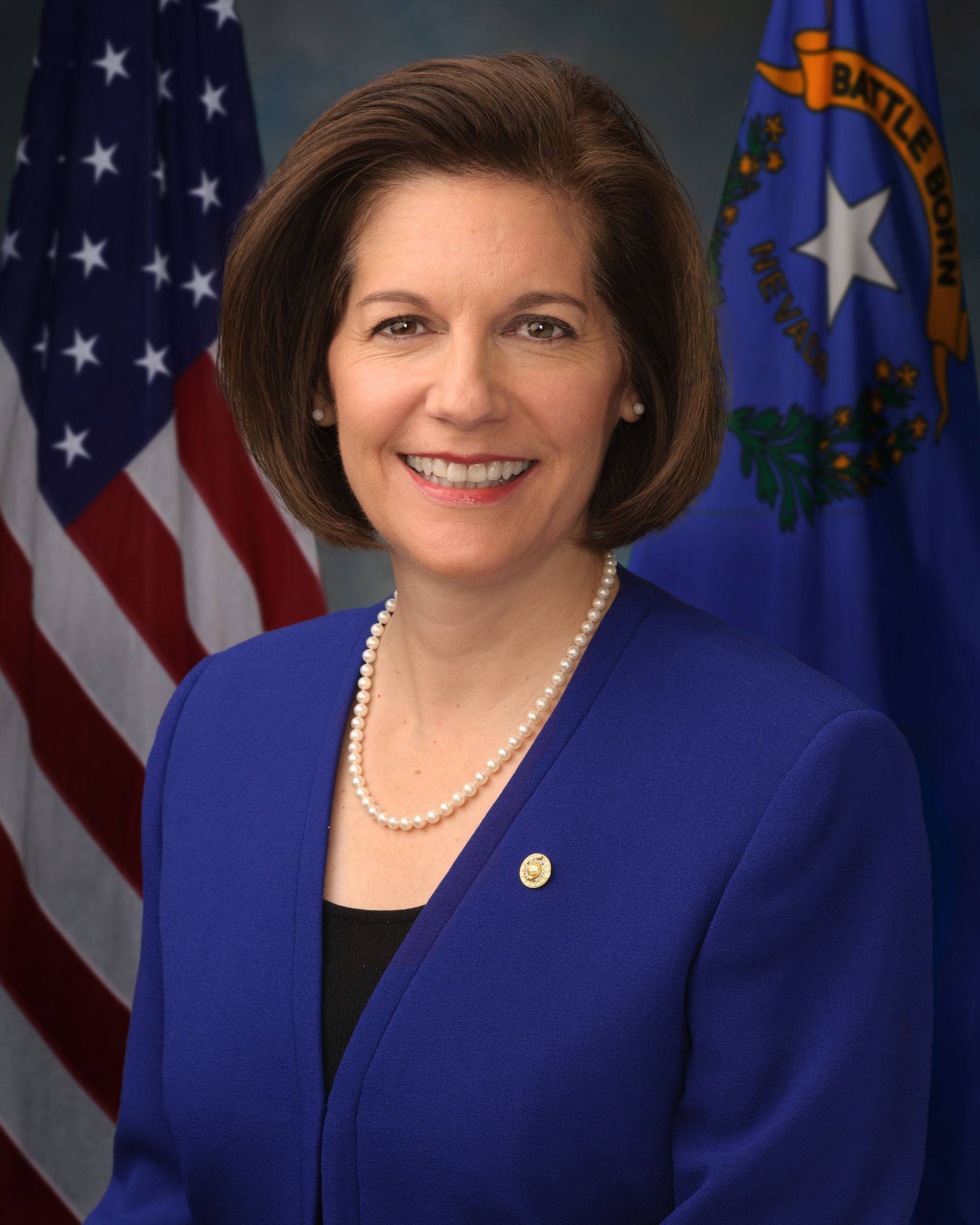
Catherine Cortez Masto

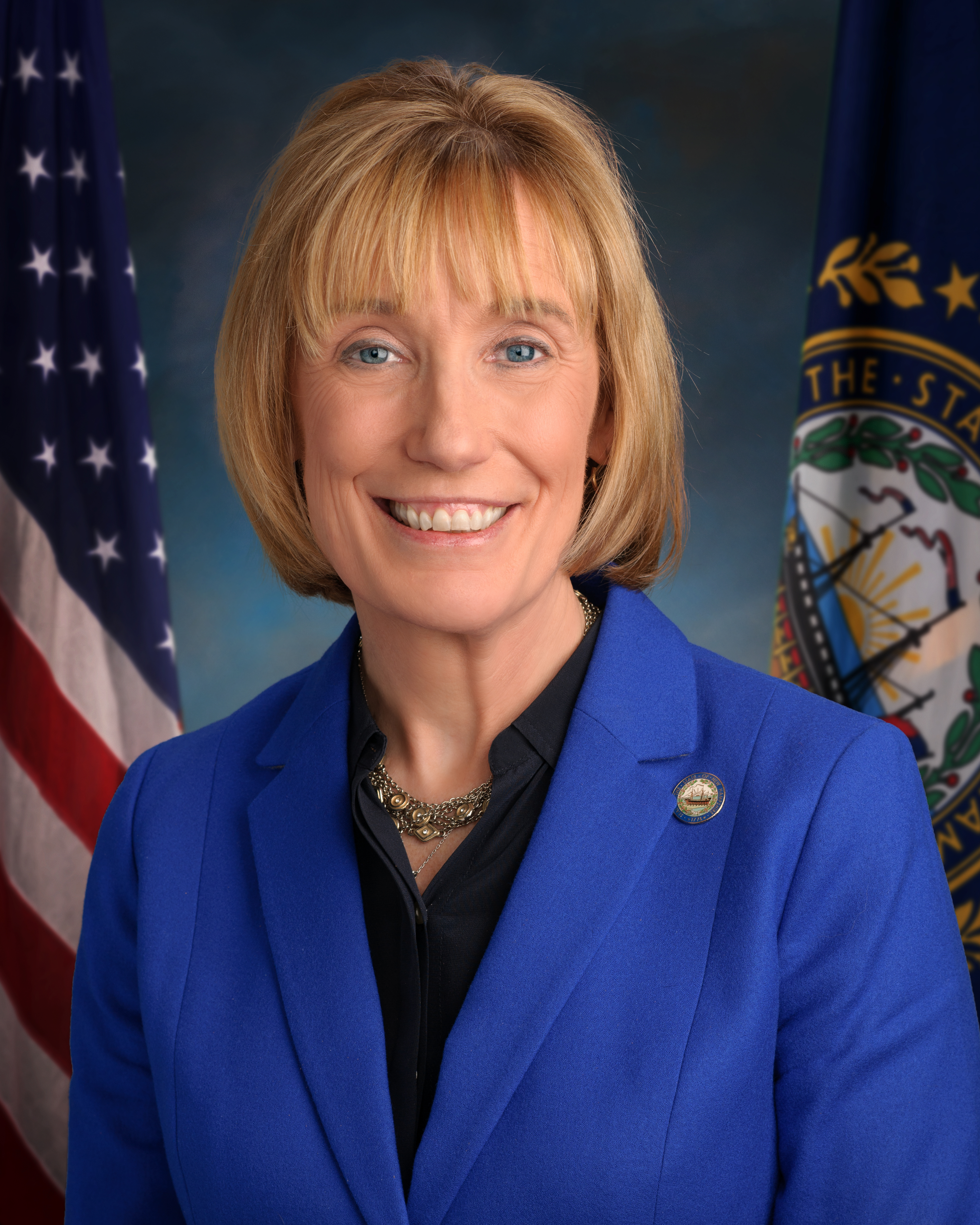
Maggie Hassan

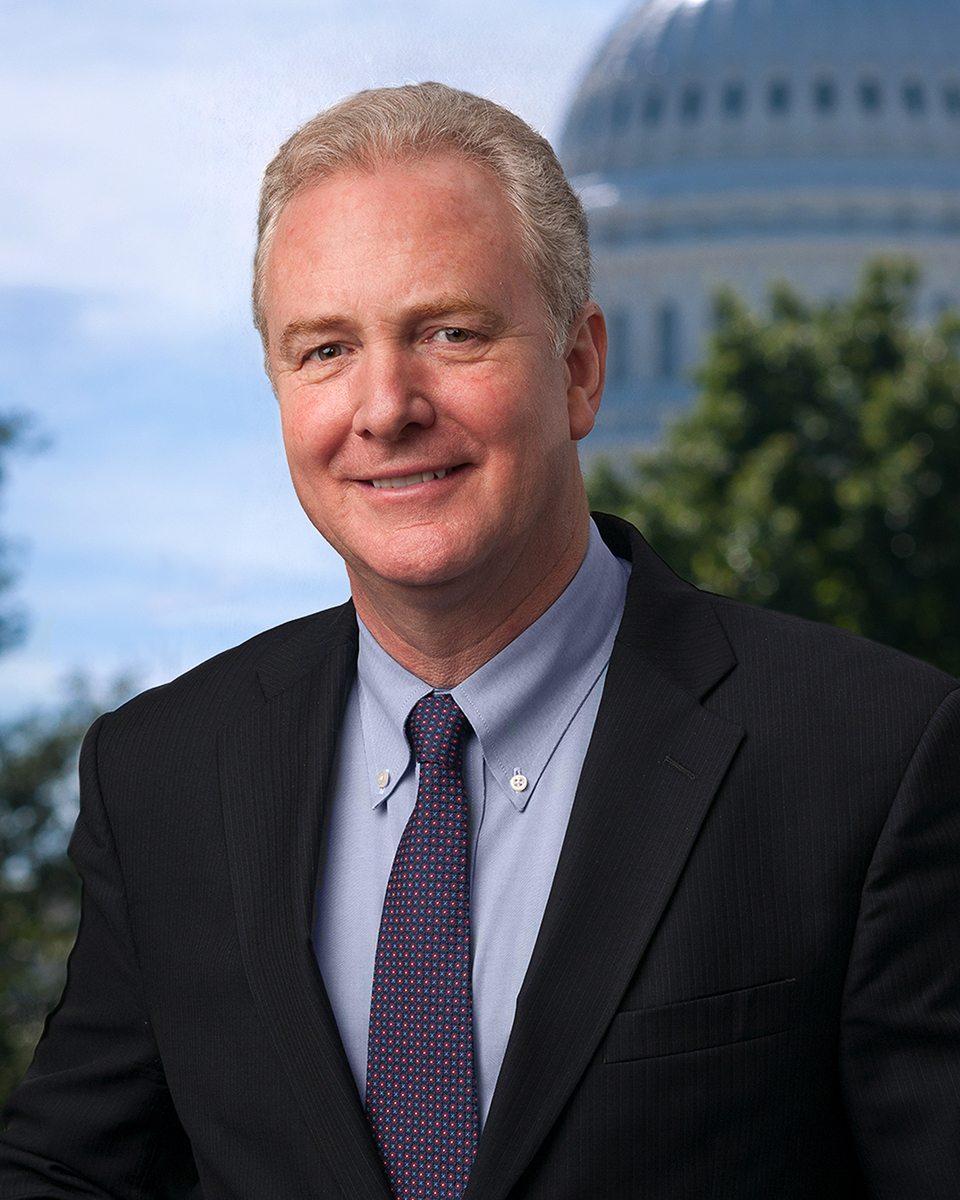
Chris Van Hollen

As of July 2024, 35 out of the 47 currently serving Democratic senators and one Independent senator had endorsed Biden.

- Tammy Baldwin, Wisconsin (2013–present)
- Richard Blumenthal, Connecticut (2011–present), 23rd Attorney General of Connecticut (1993–2011)
- Cory Booker, New Jersey (2013–present), 2020 presidential candidate
- ~~Sherrod Brown, Ohio (2007–2025), U.S. representative for OH-13 (1993–2007)~~ (called for Biden to withdraw)
- Laphonza Butler, California (2023–present)
- Maria Cantwell, Washington (2001–present), U.S. representative for WA-01 (1993–1995)
- Tom Carper, Delaware (2001–2025), 71st governor of Delaware (1993–2001), U.S. representative for DE-AL (1983–1993)
- Bob Casey Jr., Pennsylvania (2007–2025)
- Chris Coons, (Note: Biden campaign national co-chair) Delaware (2010–present)
- Tammy Duckworth, Illinois (2017–present), U.S. representative from IL-08 (2013–2017), Assistant Secretary of the U.S. Department of Veteran Affairs (2009–2011)
- Dick Durbin, Illinois (1997–present), Senate Majority Whip (2007–2015, 2021–present)
- John Fetterman, Pennsylvania (2023–present), lieutenant governor of Pennsylvania (2019–2023)
- Kirsten Gillibrand, New York (2009–present), U.S. representative from NY-20 (2007–2009)
- Maggie Hassan, New Hampshire (2017–present), 81st governor of New Hampshire (2013–2017)
- John Hickenlooper, Colorado (2021–present), 42nd governor of Colorado (2011–2019), 43rd Mayor of Denver (2003–2011)
- Amy Klobuchar, Minnesota (2007–present), 2020 presidential candidate
- Ed Markey, Massachusetts (2013–present), U.S. representative from MA-07 (1976–2013) and MA-05 (2013), Senate author of the Green New Deal
- Catherine Cortez Masto, Nevada (2017–present), Attorney General of Nevada (2007–2015)
- Jeff Merkley, Oregon (2009–present)
- Chris Murphy, Connecticut (2013–present), U.S. representative from CT-05 (2007–13)
- Patty Murray, Washington (1993–present), president pro tempore of the Senate (2023–present)
- Jon Ossoff, Georgia (2021–present)
- Alex Padilla, California (2021–present), Secretary of State of California (2015–21)
- Gary Peters, Michigan (2015–present), U.S. representative for MI-14 (2013–15) and MI-09 (2009–13)
- Bernie Sanders, Vermont (2007–present), U.S. representative from VT-AL (1991–2007), 2016 and 2020 presidential candidate (Independent)
- Brian Schatz, Hawaii (2012–present), 12th lieutenant governor of Hawaii (2010–2012)
- Chuck Schumer, New York (1999–present), Senate Majority Leader (2021–present), Senate Minority Leader (2017–2021), U.S. representative from NY-09 (1993–1999), NY-10 (1983–1993) and NY-16 (1981–1983)
- Jeanne Shaheen, New Hampshire (2009–present), 78th governor of New Hampshire (1997–2003)
- Tina Smith, Minnesota (2018–present), 48th lieutenant governor of Minnesota (2015–2018)
- ~~Jon Tester, Montana (2007–2025)~~ (called on Biden to withdraw)
- Chris Van Hollen, Maryland (2017–present), U.S. representative from MD-08 (2003–2017)
- Raphael Warnock, Georgia (2021–present)
- Elizabeth Warren, Massachusetts (2013–present), 2020 presidential candidate
- Sheldon Whitehouse, Rhode Island (2007–present), Attorney General of Rhode Island (1999–2003)
- Ron Wyden, Oregon (1996–present), U.S. representative from OR-03 (1981–1996)

=== Former ===
- Barbara Boxer, California (1993–2017)
- Carol Moseley Braun, Illinois (1993–1999)

== U.S. representatives ==
=== Current ===
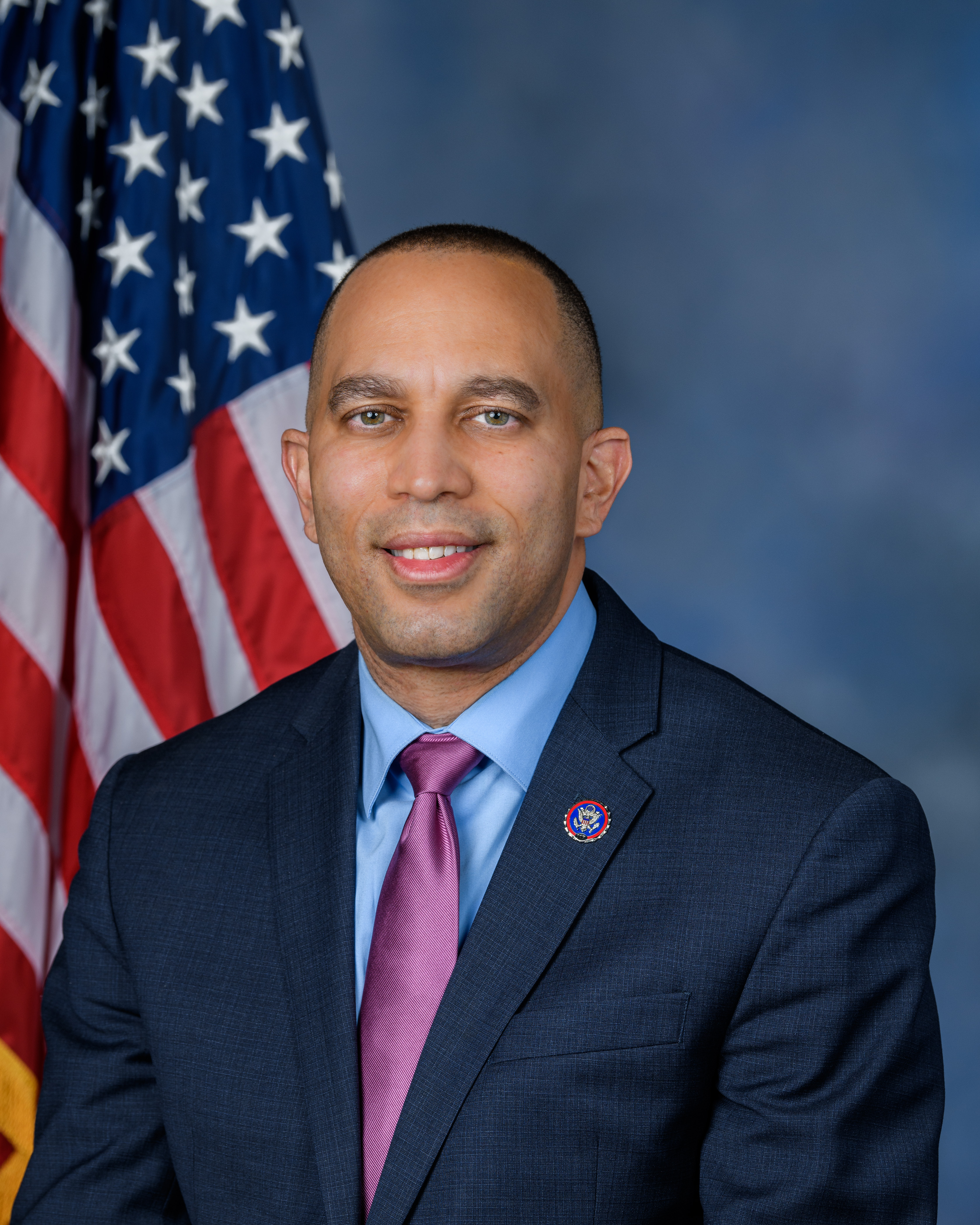
Hakeem Jeffries

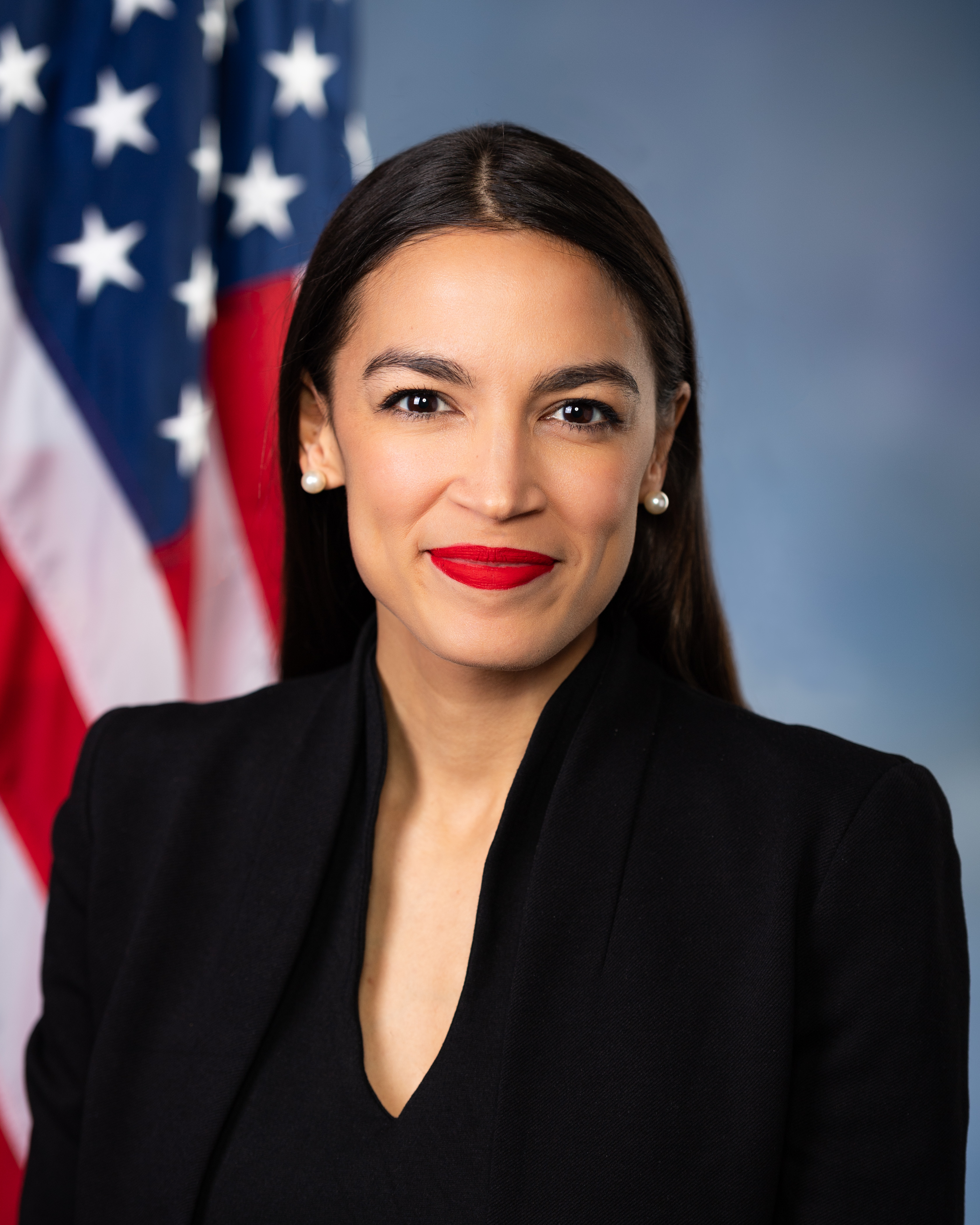
Alexandria Ocasio-Cortez

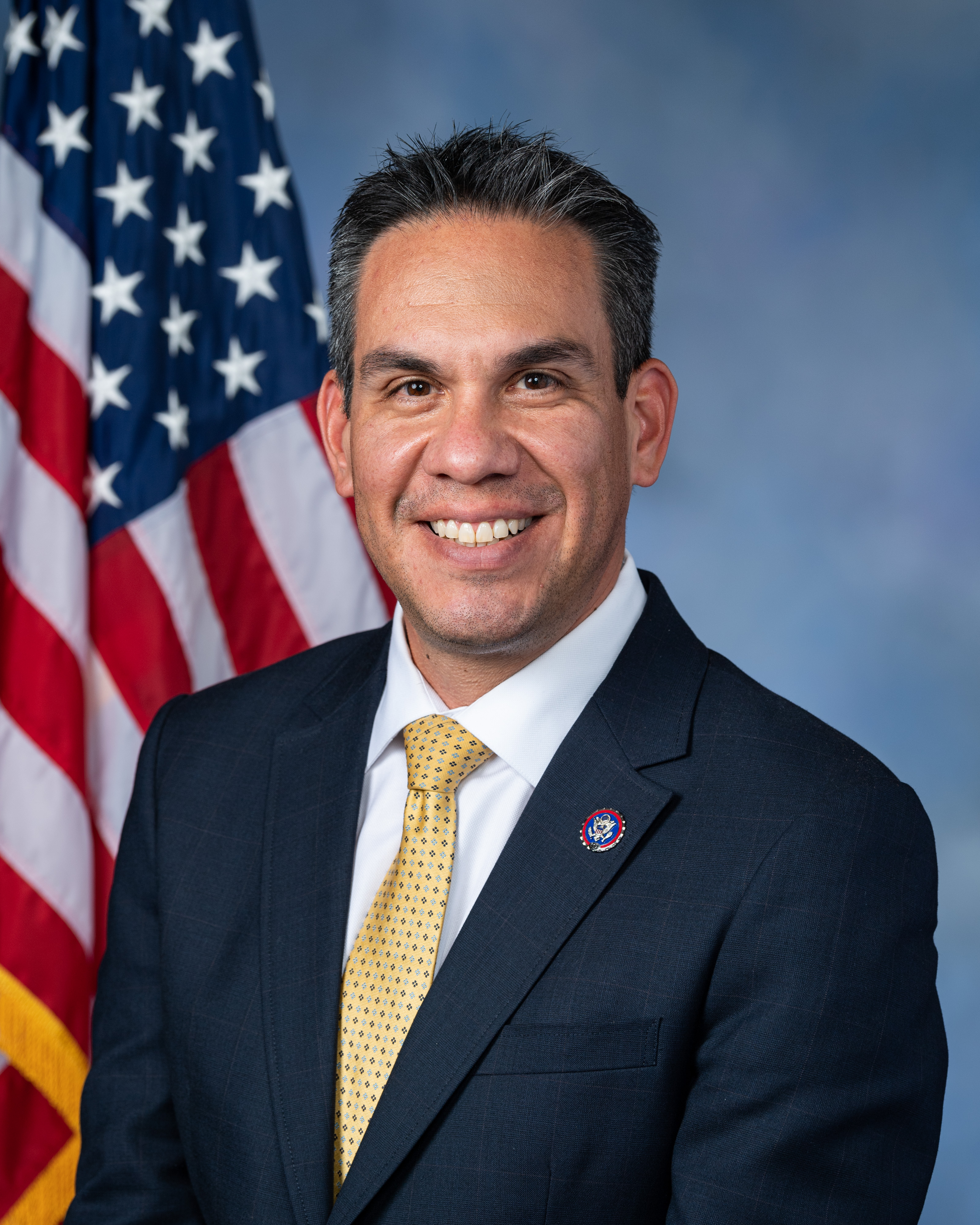
Pete Aguilar

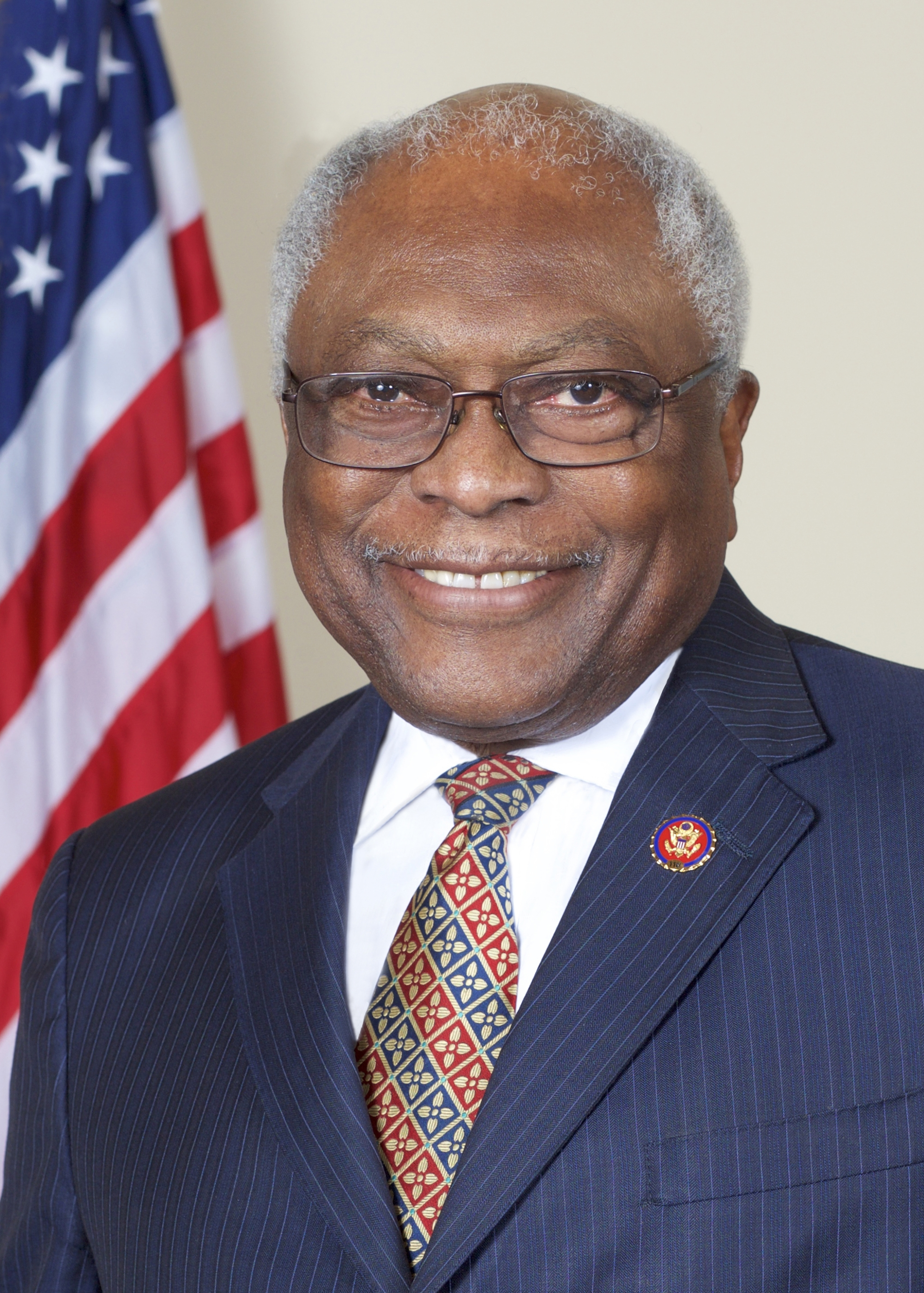
Jim Clyburn

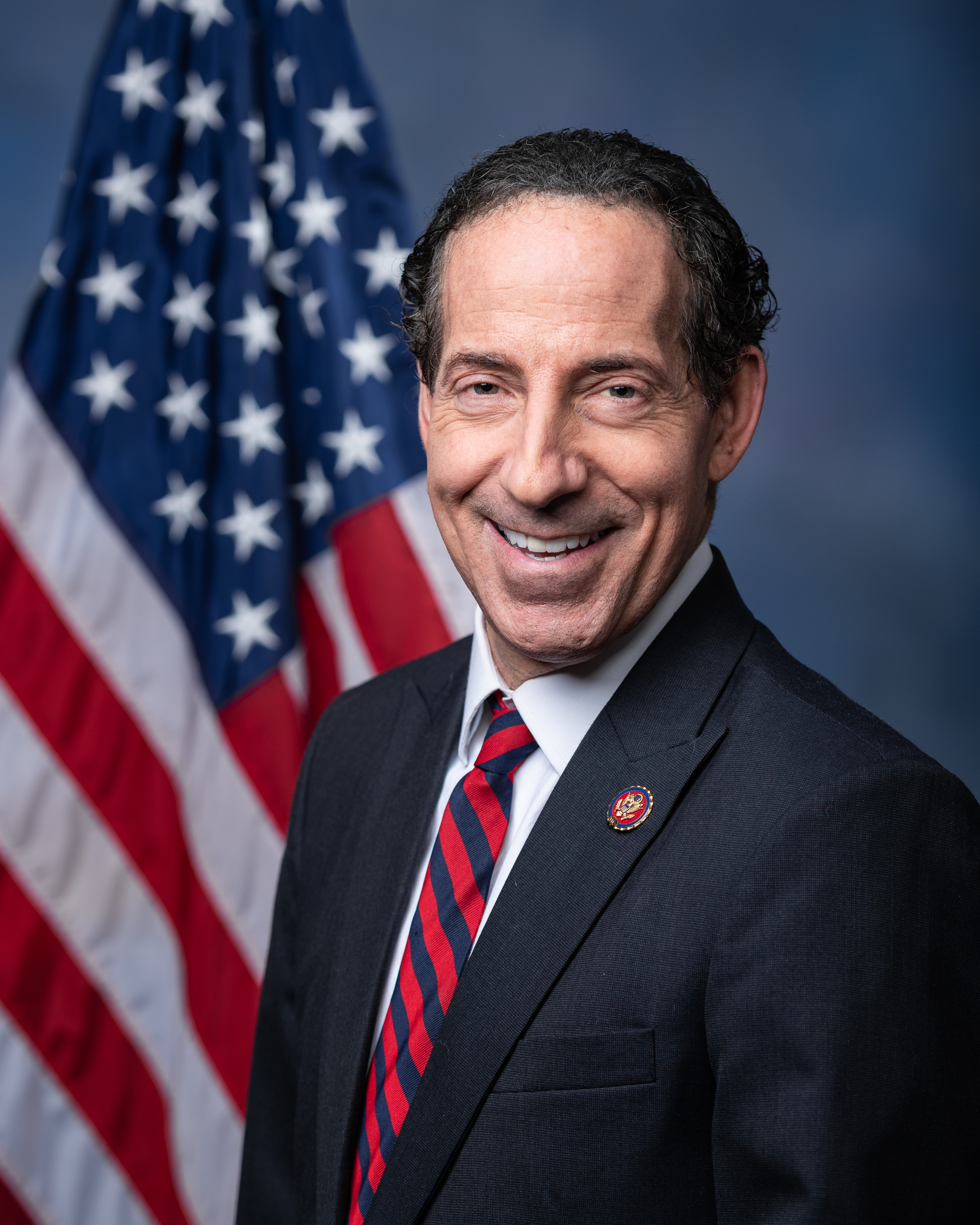
Jamie Raskin

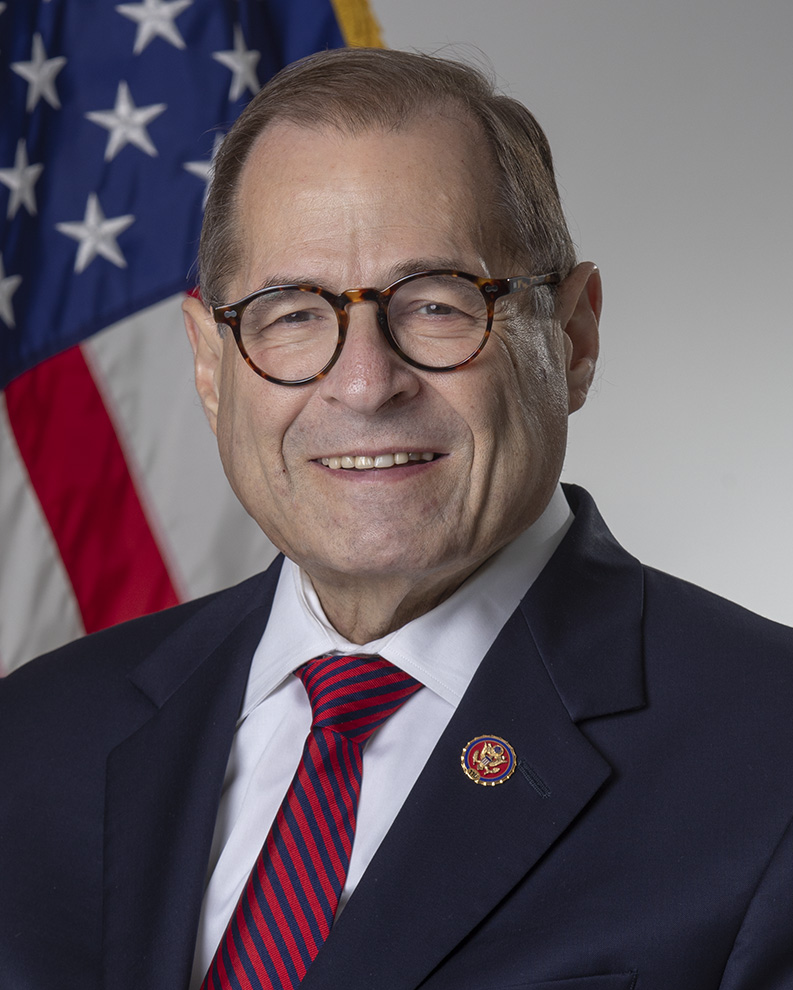
Jerry Nadler

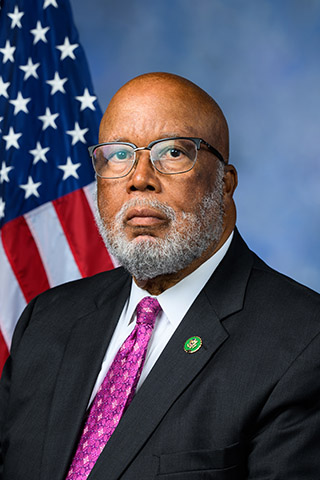
Bennie Thompson

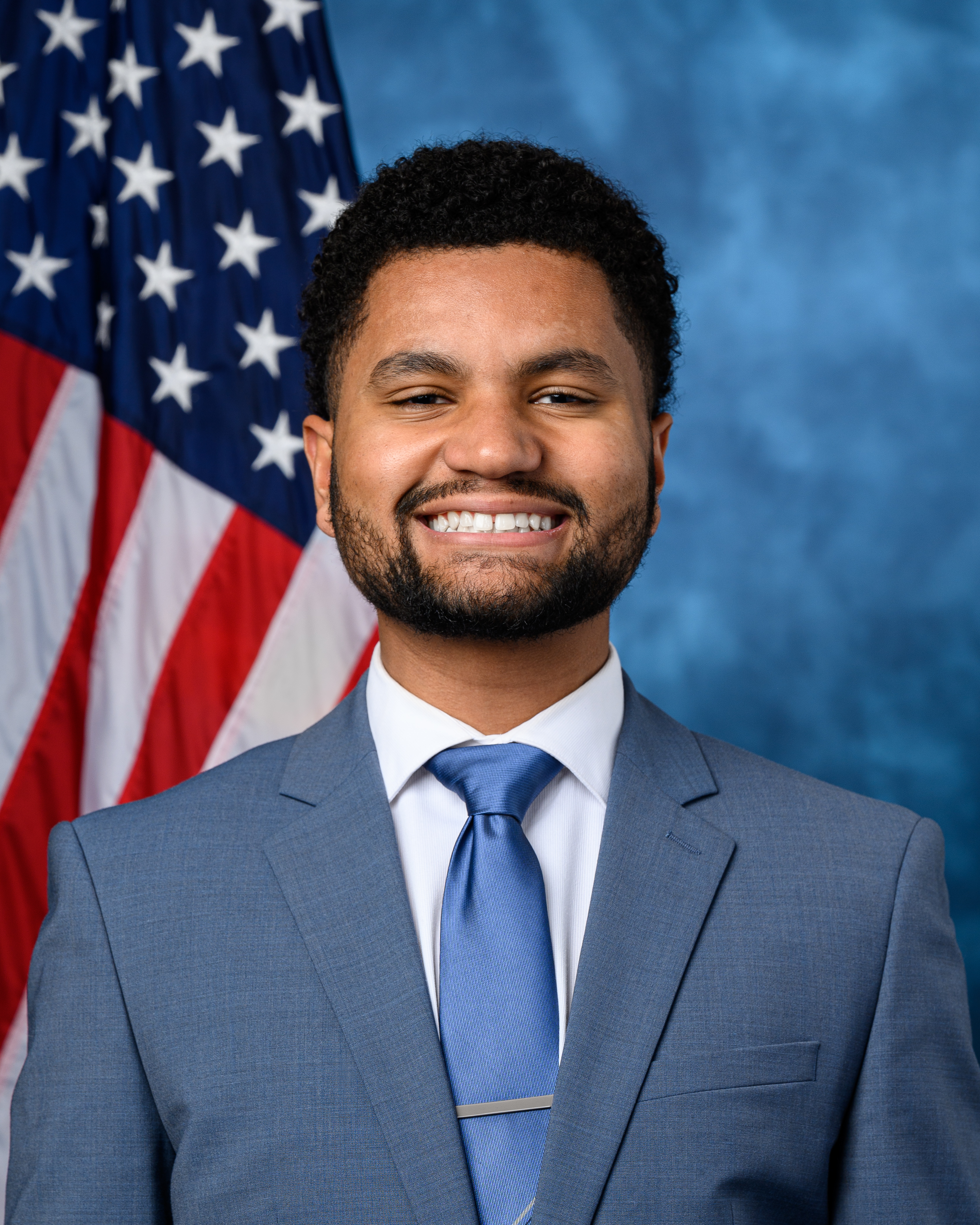
Maxwell Frost

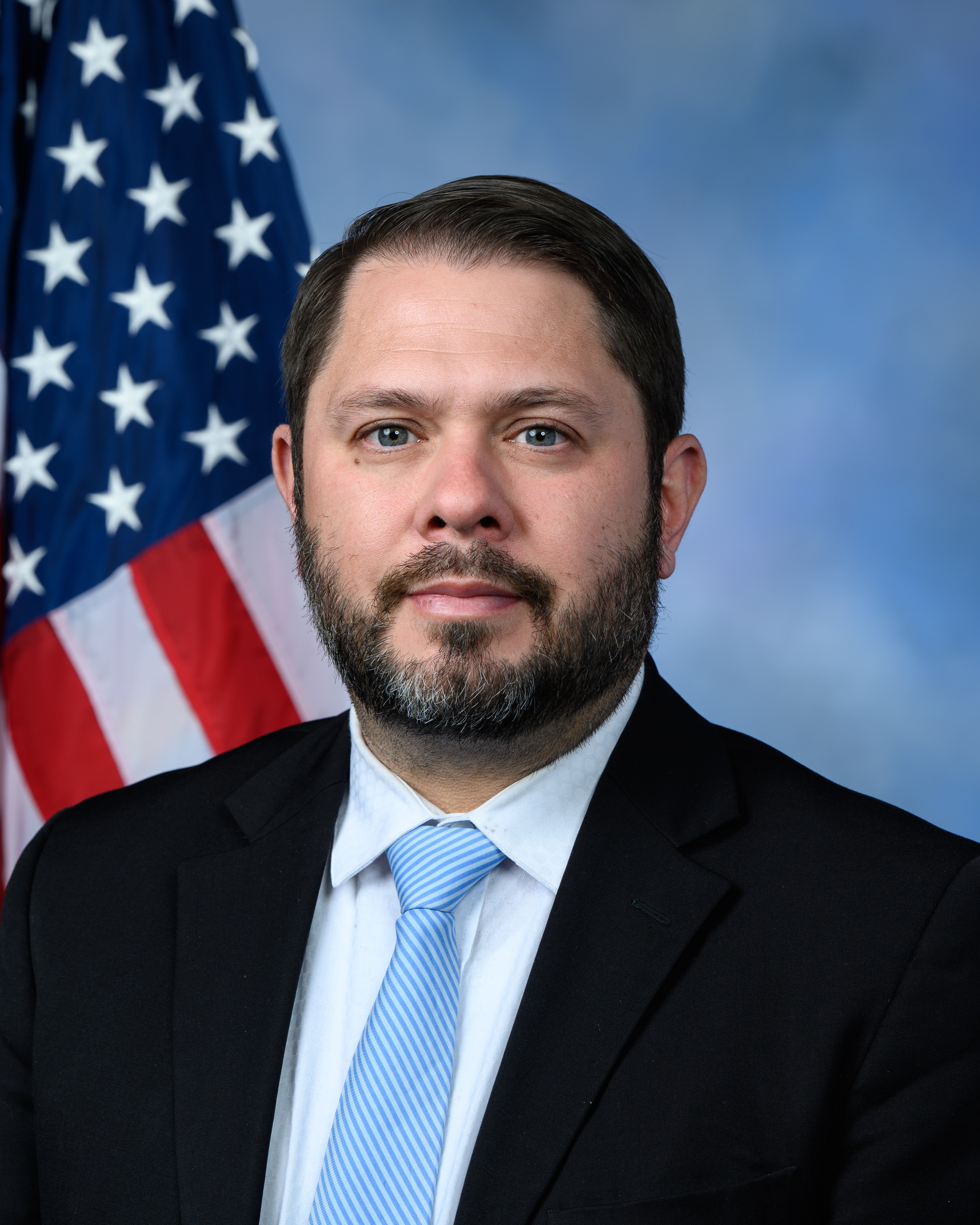
Ruben Gallego

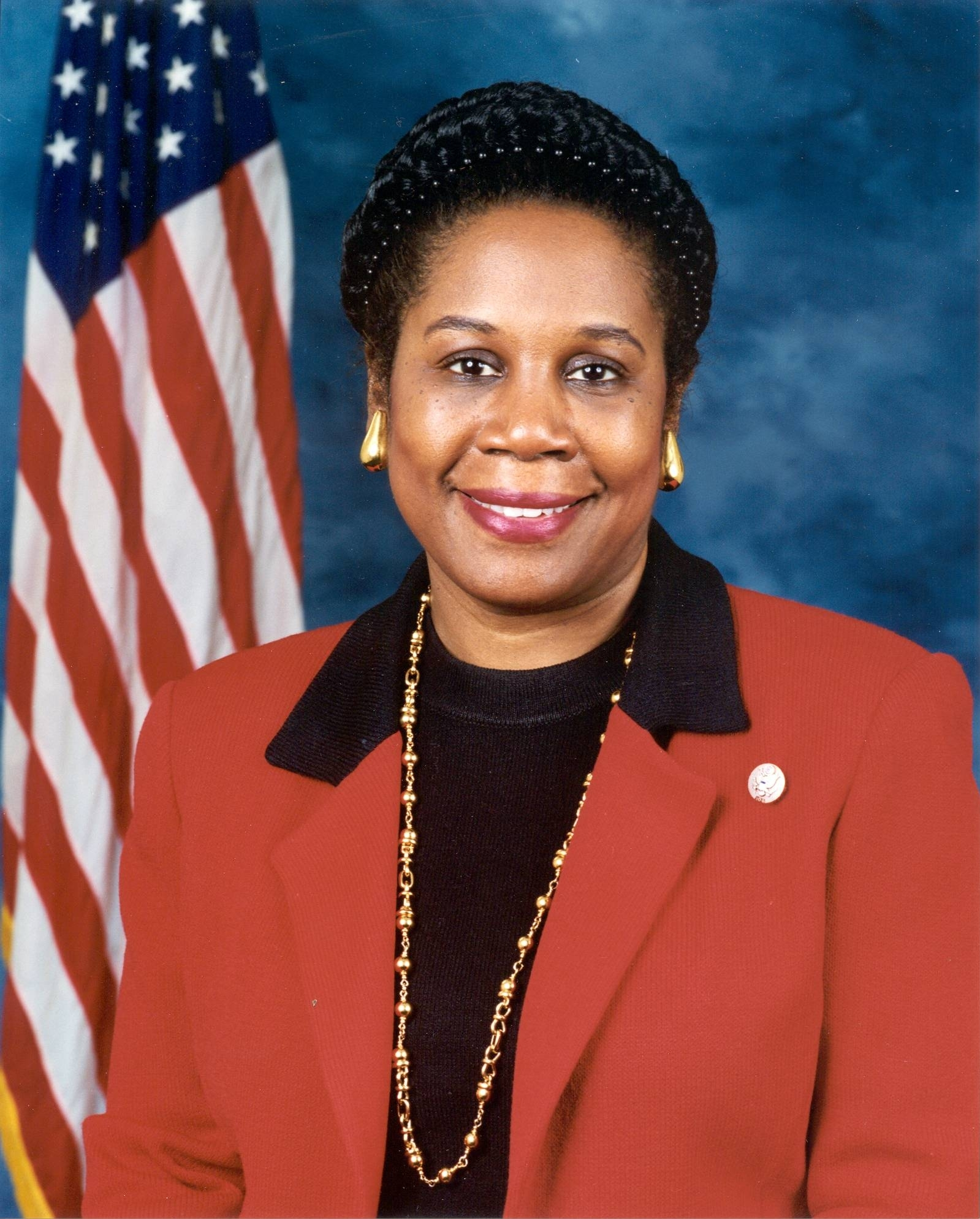
Sheila Jackson Lee

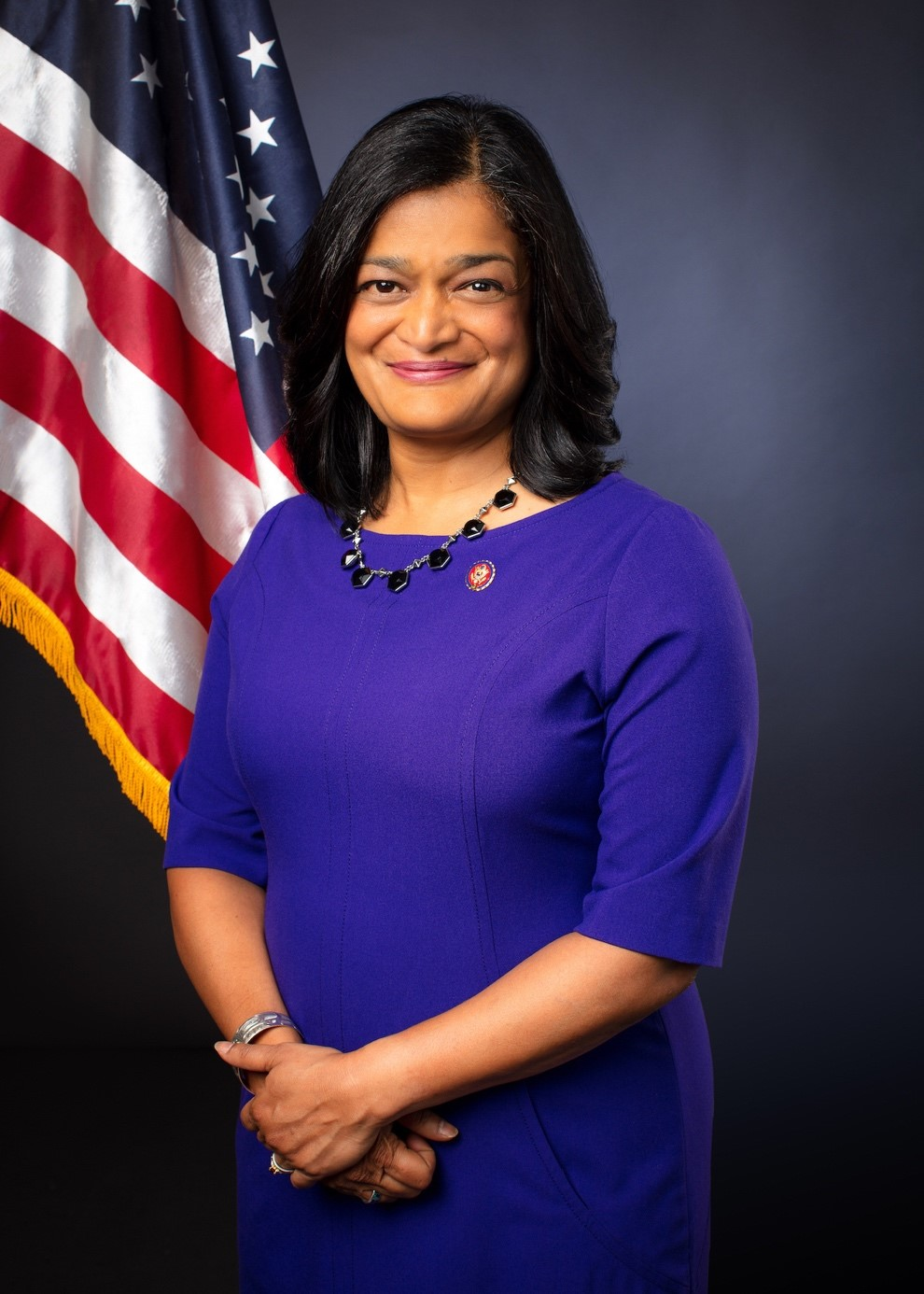
Pramila Jayapal

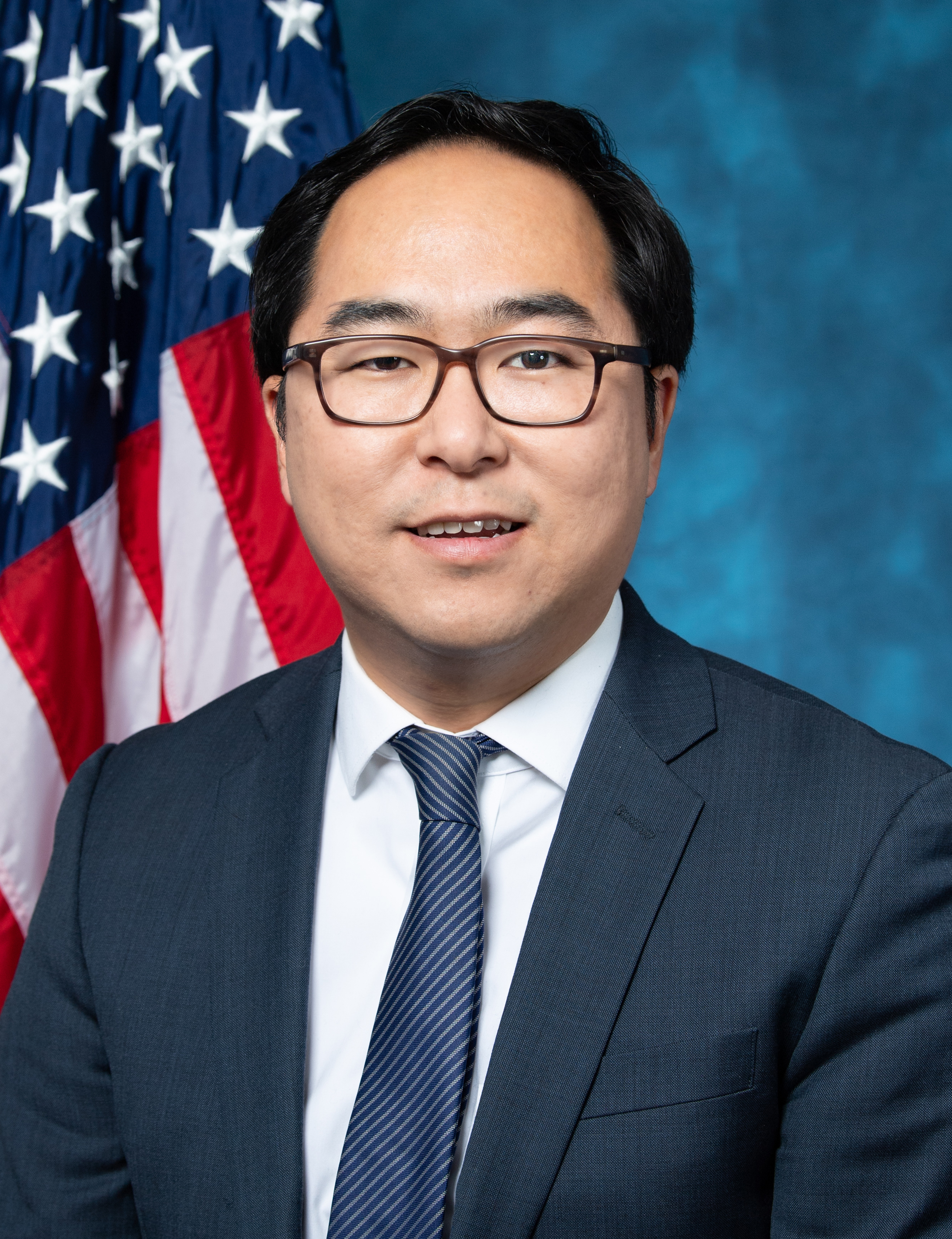
Andy Kim

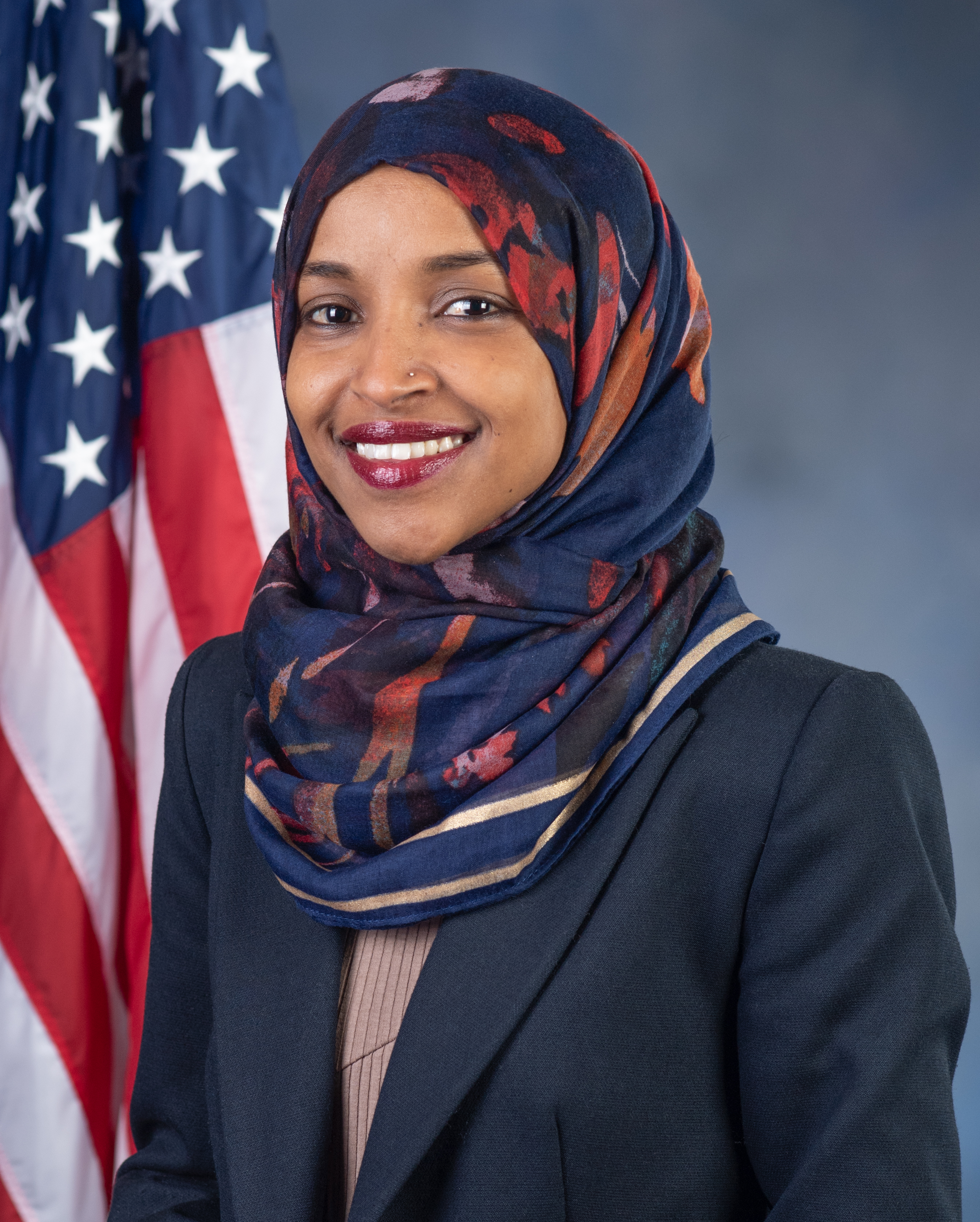
Ilhan Omar

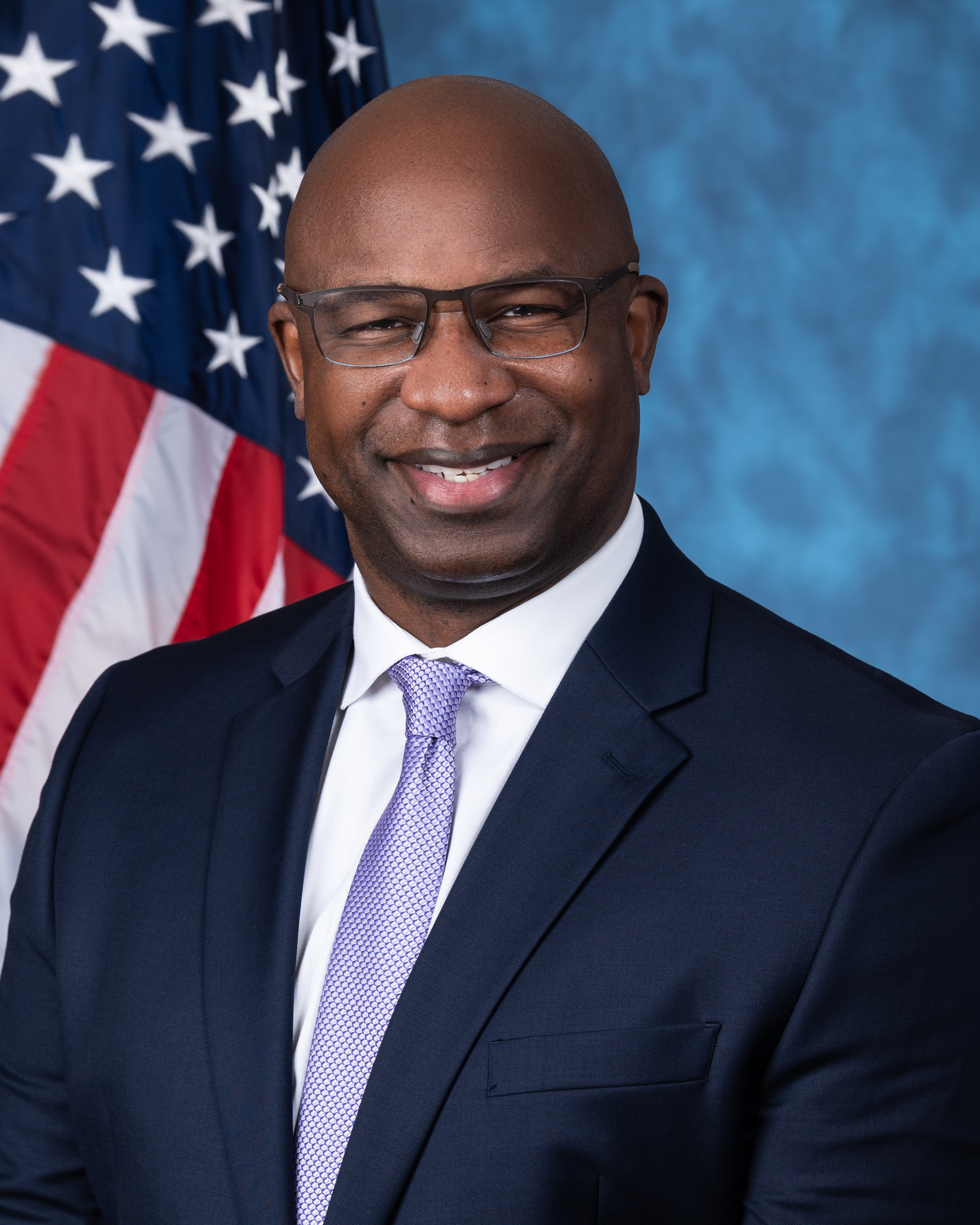
Jamaal Bowman

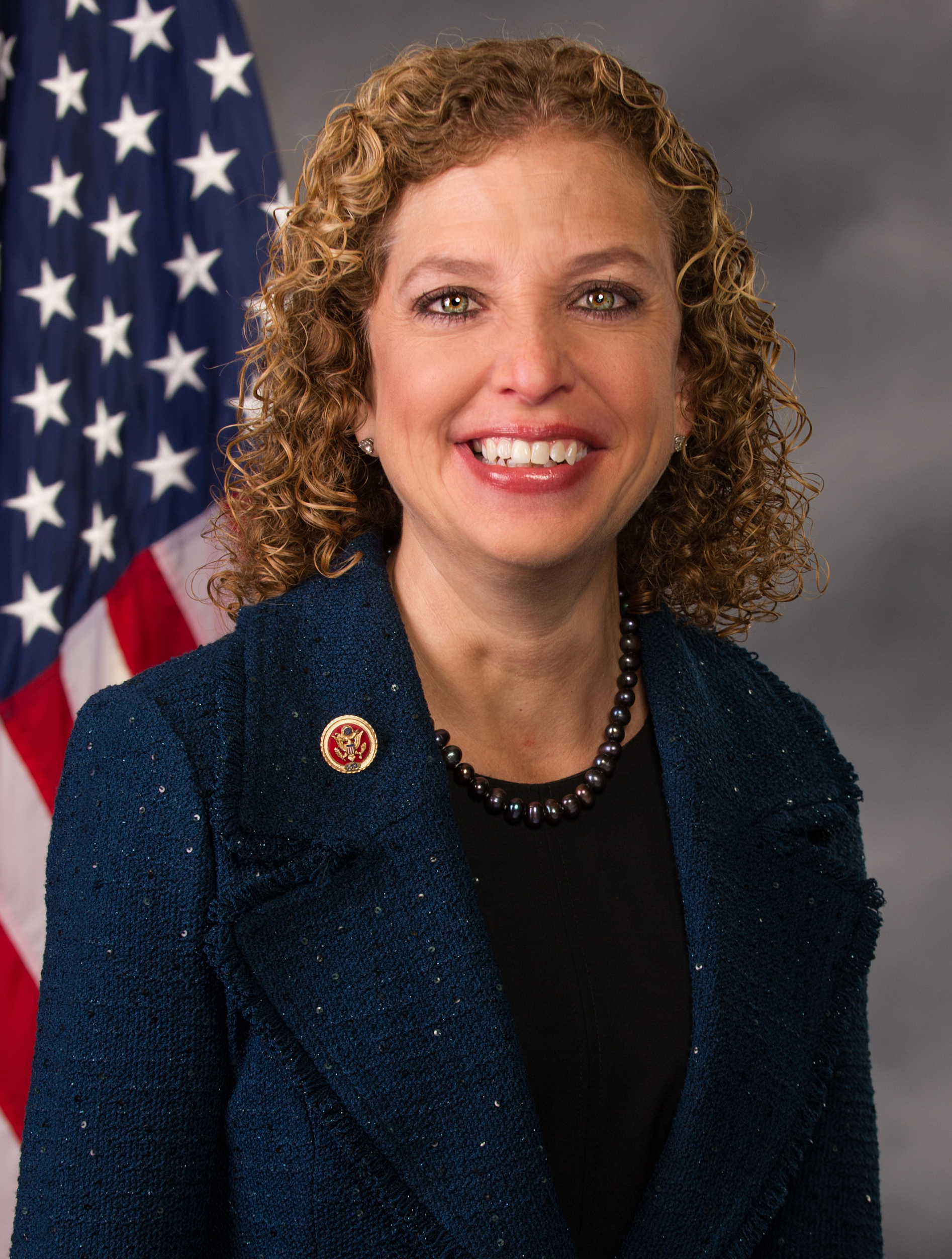
Debbie Wasserman Schultz

- Alma Adams, NC-12 (2014–present)
- Pete Aguilar, CA-33 (2023–present), CA-31 (2015–2023), Chair of the House Democratic Caucus (2023–present)
- Colin Allred, TX-32 (2019–present), nominee for U.S. senator from Texas in 2024
- Gabe Amo, RI-01 (2023–present)
- Jake Auchincloss, MA-04 (2021–present)
- Becca Balint, VT-AL (2023–present)
- Nanette Barragán, CA-44 (2017–present)
- Joyce Beatty, OH-03 (2013–present)
- Ami Bera, CA-06 (2023–present), CA-07 (2013–2023)
- Don Beyer, VA-08 (2015–present)
- Sanford Bishop, GA-02 (1993–present)
- Lisa Blunt Rochester, DE-AL (2017–present), candidate for U.S. senator from Delaware in 2024
- Jamaal Bowman, NY-16 (2021–present)
- Brendan Boyle, PA-02 (2015–present)
- Shontel Brown, OH-11 (2021–present)
- Nikki Budzinski, IL-13 (2023–present)
- André Carson, IN-07 (2008–present)
- Troy Carter, LA-02 (2021–present)
- Matt Cartwright, PA-08 (2019–present), PA-17 (2013–2019)
- Greg Casar, TX-35 (2023–present)
- Joaquin Castro, TX-20 (2013–present)
- Sheila Cherfilus-McCormick, FL-20 (2022–present)
- Katherine Clark, MA-05 (2013–present), House Minority Whip (2023–present)
- Emanuel Cleaver, MO-05 (2005–present)
- Jim Clyburn, SC-06 (1993–present), House Assistant Democratic Leader (2011–2019, 2023–present)
- Steve Cohen, TN-09 (2007–present)
- Lou Correa, CA-46 (2017–present)
- ~~Jim Costa, CA-21 (2023–present), CA-16 (2013–2023), CA-05 (2005–2013)~~ (called on Biden to withdraw)
- Joe Courtney, CT-02 (2007–present)
- ~~Angie Craig, MN-02 (2019–present)~~ (called on Biden to withdraw)
- Jasmine Crockett, TX-30 (2023–present)
- Jason Crow, CO-06 (2019–present)
- Henry Cuellar, TX-28 (2005–present)
- Danny Davis, IL-17 (1997–present)
- Madeleine Dean, PA-04 (2019–present)
- Diana DeGette, CO-01 (1997–present)
- Chris Deluzio, PA-17 (2023–present)
- Veronica Escobar, TX-16 (2019–present)
- Adriano Espaillat, NY-13 (2017–present)
- Dwight Evans, PA-03 (2019–present), PA-02 (2016–2019)
- Lizzie Fletcher, TX-07 (2019–present)
- Valerie Foushee, NC-04 (2023–present)
- Lois Frankel, FL-22 (2023–present;2013–2017), FL-21 (2017–2023)
- Maxwell Frost, FL-10 (2023–present)
- Ruben Gallego, AZ-07 (2015–2023), AZ-03 (2023–present), candidate for U.S. senator from Arizona in 2024
- Robert Garcia, CA-42 (2023–present)
- Sylvia Garcia, TX-29 (2019–present)
- Dan Goldman, NY-10 (2023–present)
- Vicente Gonzalez, TX-34 (2023–present), TX-15 (2017–2023)
- Josh Gottheimer, NJ-05 (2017–present)
- Al Green, TX-09 (2005–present)
- Steven Horsford, NV-04 (2013–2015, 2019–present), chair of the Congressional Black Caucus (2023–present)
- Chrissy Houlahan, PA-06 (2019–present)
- Val Hoyle, OR-04 (2023–present)
- Glenn Ivey, MD-04 (2023–present)
- Jonathan Jackson, IL-01 (2023–present)
- Sara Jacobs, CA-51 (2023–present), CA-53 (2021–2023)
- Pramila Jayapal, WA-07 (2017–present), chair of the Congressional Progressive Caucus (2021–present)
- Hakeem Jeffries, NY-08 (2013–present), House Minority Leader (2023–present)
- Hank Johnson, GA-04 (2007–present)
- Marcy Kaptur, OH-09 (1983–present)
- Robin Kelly, IL-02 (2013–present)
- Tim Kennedy, NY-26 (2024–present), New York State Senator (2011–2024)
- Ro Khanna, CA-17 (2017–present)
- Dan Kildee, MI-08 (2023–present), MI-05 (2013–2023)
- Andy Kim, NJ-03 (2019–2024), candidate for U.S. senator from New Jersey in 2024
- Annie Kuster, NH-02 (2013–present)
- Barbara Lee, CA-12 (2023–present), CA-13 (2013–2023), CA-09 (1998–2013)
- Susie Lee, NV-03 (2019–present)
- ~~Mike Levin, CA-49 (2019–present)~~ (called on Biden to withdraw)
- Stephen Lynch, MA-08 (2013–present), MA-09 (2001–2013)
- Jennifer McClellan, VA-04 (2023–present)
- ~~Betty McCollum, MN-04 (2001–present)~~ (called on Biden to withdraw)
- Jim McGovern, MA-02 (2013–present), MA-03 (1997–2013)
- Rob Menendez, NJ-08 (2023–present)
- Grace Meng, NY-06 (2013–present)
- Kweisi Mfume, MD-07 (1987–1996, 2020–present)
- Gwen Moore, WI-04 (2005–present)
- ~~Seth Moulton, MA-06 (2015–present)~~ (called on Biden to withdraw)
- Jerry Nadler, NY-12 (2023–present), NY-10 (2013–2023), NY-08 (1993–2013), NY-17 (1992–1993)
- Richard Neal, MA-01 (2013–present), MA-02 (1998–2013)
- Joe Neguse, CO-02 (2019–present)
- Wiley Nickel, NC-13 (2023–present)
- Donald Norcross, NJ-01 (2014–present)
- Alexandria Ocasio-Cortez, NY-14 (2019–present)
- Ilhan Omar, MN-05 (2019–present)
- Frank Pallone, NJ-06 (1993–present), NJ-03 (1988–1993)
- Bill Pascrell, NJ-09 (2013–present), NJ-08 (1997–2013)
- ~~Nancy Pelosi, CA-11 (2023–present), CA-12 (2013–2023), CA-08 (1993–2013) and CA-05 (1987–1993), Speaker of the U.S. House of Representatives (2007–2011, 2019–2023), House Minority Leader (2003–2007, 2011–2019)~~ (called on Biden to withdraw)
- ~~Mary Peltola, AK-AL (2022–2025)~~ (withdrew endorsement)
- ~~Brittany Pettersen, CO-07 (2023–present)~~ (called on Biden to withdraw)
- ~~Dean Phillips, MN-03 (2019–2025) and former 2024 presidential candidate~~ (called on Biden to withdraw)
- ~~Mark Pocan, WI-02 (2013–present)~~ (called on Biden to withdraw)
- Katie Porter, CA-47 (2023–present), CA-45 (2019–2023); Democratic candidate for U.S. senator from California in 2024
- Delia Ramirez, IL-03 (2023–present)
- Jamie Raskin, MD-08 (2017–present)
- Deborah Ross, NC-02 (2021–present)
- ~~Pat Ryan, NY-18 (2023–present), NY-19 (2022–2023)~~ (called on Biden to withdraw)
- Jan Schakowsky, IL-19 (1999–present)
- Bobby Scott, VA-03 (1993–present)
- Terri Sewell, AL-07 (2011–present)
- ~~Mikie Sherrill, NJ-11 (2019–present)~~ (called on Biden to withdraw)
- ~~Eric Sorensen, IL-17 (2023–present)~~ (called on Biden to withdraw)
- Darren Soto, FL-09 (2017–present)
- Abigail Spanberger, VA-07 (2019–present), candidate for governor of Virginia in 2025
- Melanie Stansbury, NM-01 (2021–present)
- Tom Suozzi, NY-03 (2017–2023, 2024–present), candidate for governor of New York in 2022
- Eric Swalwell, CA-14 (2023–present), CA-15 (2013–2023)
- Shri Thanedar, MI-13 (2023–present)
- Bennie Thompson, MS-02 (1993–present)
- Dina Titus, NV-01 (2013–present), NV-03 (2009–2011)
- Jill Tokuda, HI-02 (2023–present)
- Norma Torres, CA-35 (2015–present)
- David Trone, MD-06 (2019–present), candidate for U.S. senator from Maryland in 2024
- Lauren Underwood, IL-14 (2019–present)
- ~~Marc Veasey, TX-33 (2013–present)~~ (called on Biden to withdraw)
- Debbie Wasserman Schultz, FL-25 (2023–present), FL-23 (2013–2023), FL-20 (2005–2013), former chair of the Democratic National Committee (2011–2016)
- Maxine Waters, CA-43 (2013–present), CA-35 (1993–2013), CA-29 (1991–1993)
- Bonnie Watson Coleman, NJ-12 (2015–present)
- Susan Wild, PA-07 (2019–present), PA-15 (2018–2019)
- Nikema Williams, GA-05 (2021–present)
- Frederica Wilson, FL-21 (2013–present), FL-17 (2011–2013)

=== Former ===
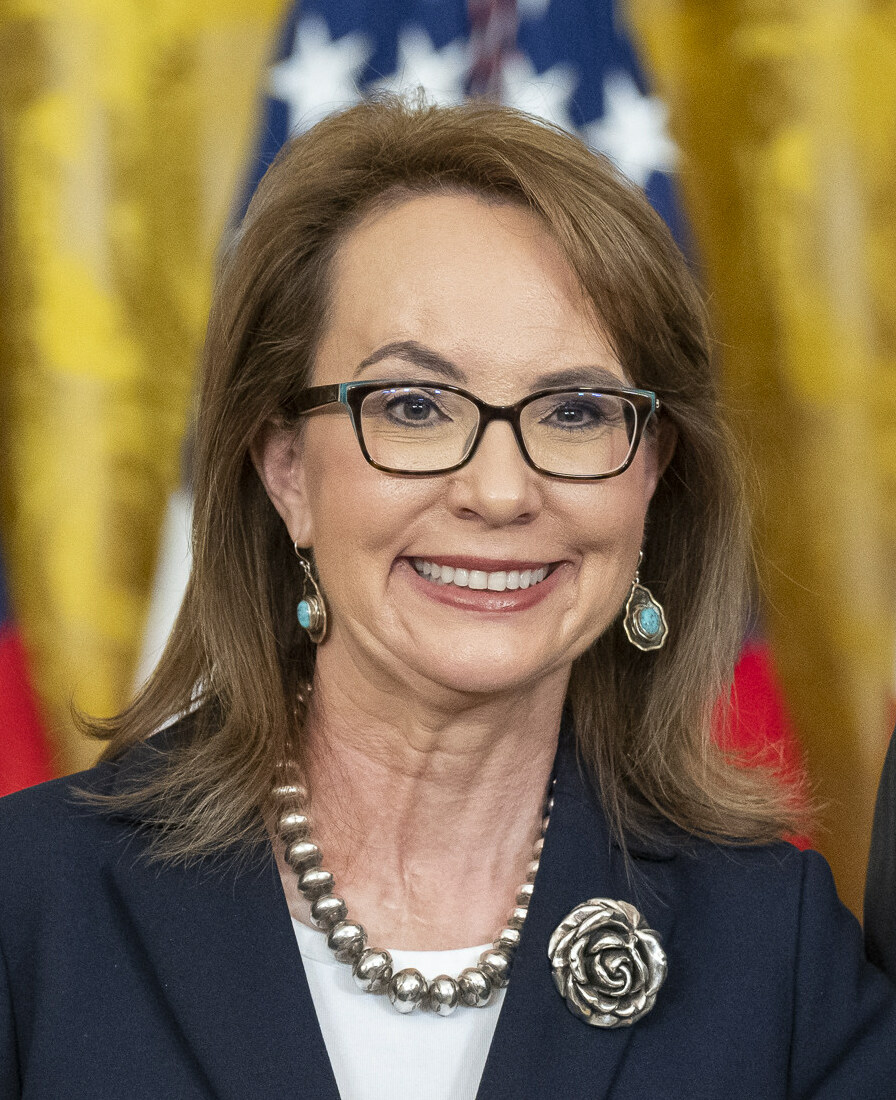
Gabby Giffords

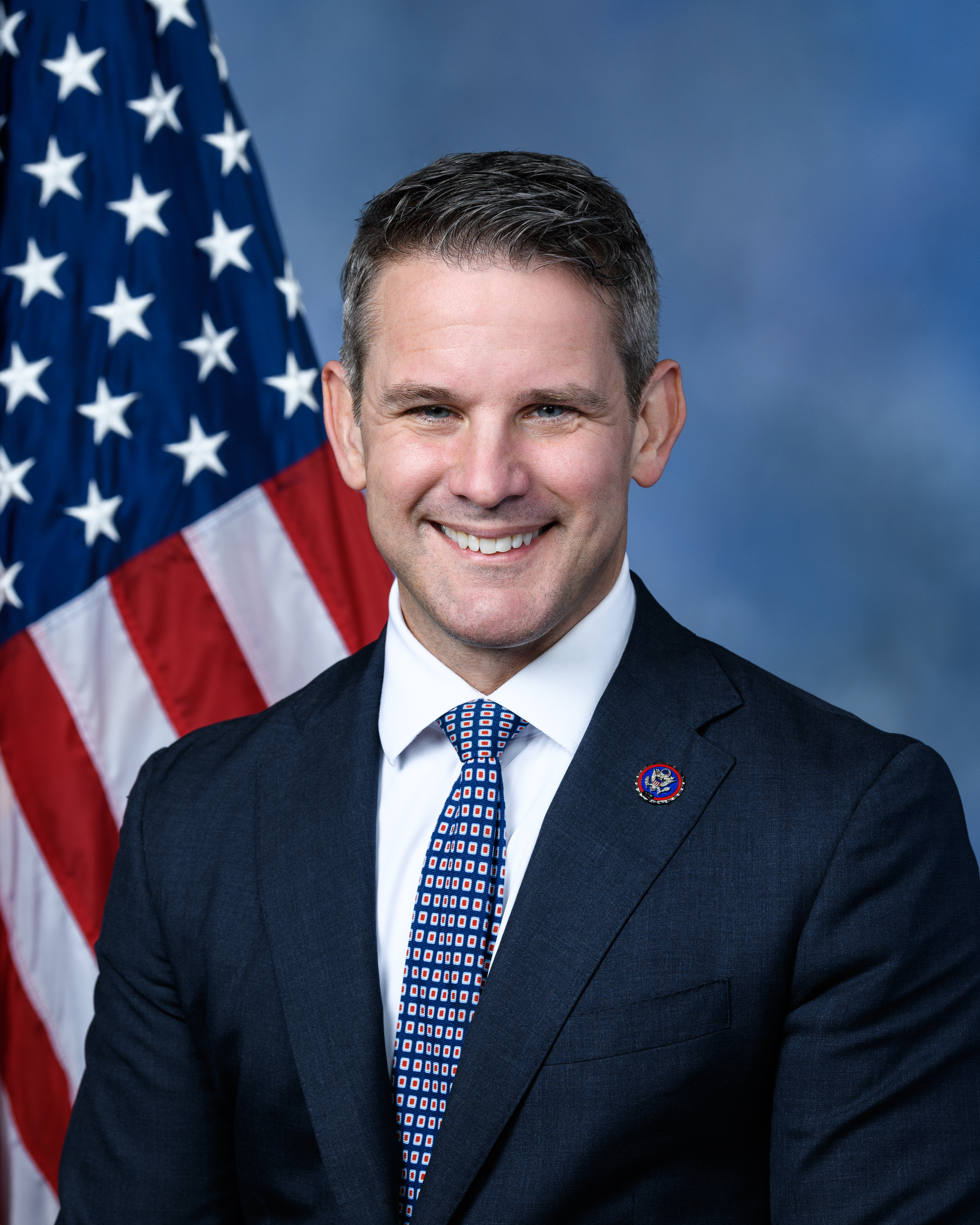
Adam Kinzinger

- David Cicilline, RI-01 (2011–2023)
- Jim Cooper, TN-05 (2003–2023) and TN-04 (1983–1995)
- Joe Cunningham, SC-01 (2019–2021)
- Val Demings, FL-10 (2017–2023), chief of the Orlando Police Department (2007–2011), nominee for U.S. senator from Florida in 2022
- Thomas Downey, NY-02 (1975–1993)
- Gabby Giffords, AZ-08 (2007–2012), wife of U.S. senator Mark Kelly
- Jim Greenwood, PA-08 (1993–2005) (Republican)
- Paul Hodes, NH-02 (2007–2011)
- Joseph P. Kennedy II, MA-08 (1987–1999), son of Robert F. Kennedy and sibling of Robert F. Kennedy Jr.
- Patrick J. Kennedy, RI-01 (1995–2011), son of Ted Kennedy
- Ron Kind, WI-03 (1997–2023)
- Adam Kinzinger, IL-11 (2011–2013), IL-16 (2013–2023) (Republican)
- Larry LaRocco, ID-01 (1991–1995)
- Sheila Jackson Lee, TX-18 (1995–2024) (died in July 2024)
- Dave Loebsack, IA-02 (2007–2021)
- Carolyn Maloney, NY-12 (2013–2023) and NY-14 (1993–2013)
- Susan Molinari, NY-13 (1993–1997) and NY-14 (1990–1993) (Republican)
- Beto O'Rourke, TX-16 (2013–2019)
- Donald Payne Jr., NJ-10 (2012–2024) (died in April 2024)
- Ed Perlmutter, CO-07 (2007–2023)
- Denver Riggleman, VA-05 (2019–2021) (Republican until 2022, Independent)
- Max Rose, NY-11 (2019–2021)
- Claudine Schneider, RI-02 (1981–1991) (Republican)
- Carol Shea-Porter, NH-01 (2007–2011) (2013–2015) (2017–2019)
- ~~Joe Walsh, IL-08 (2011–2013) (Republican until 2020, now Independent)~~ (called on Biden to withdraw)

== Statewide officials ==
=== Governors ===
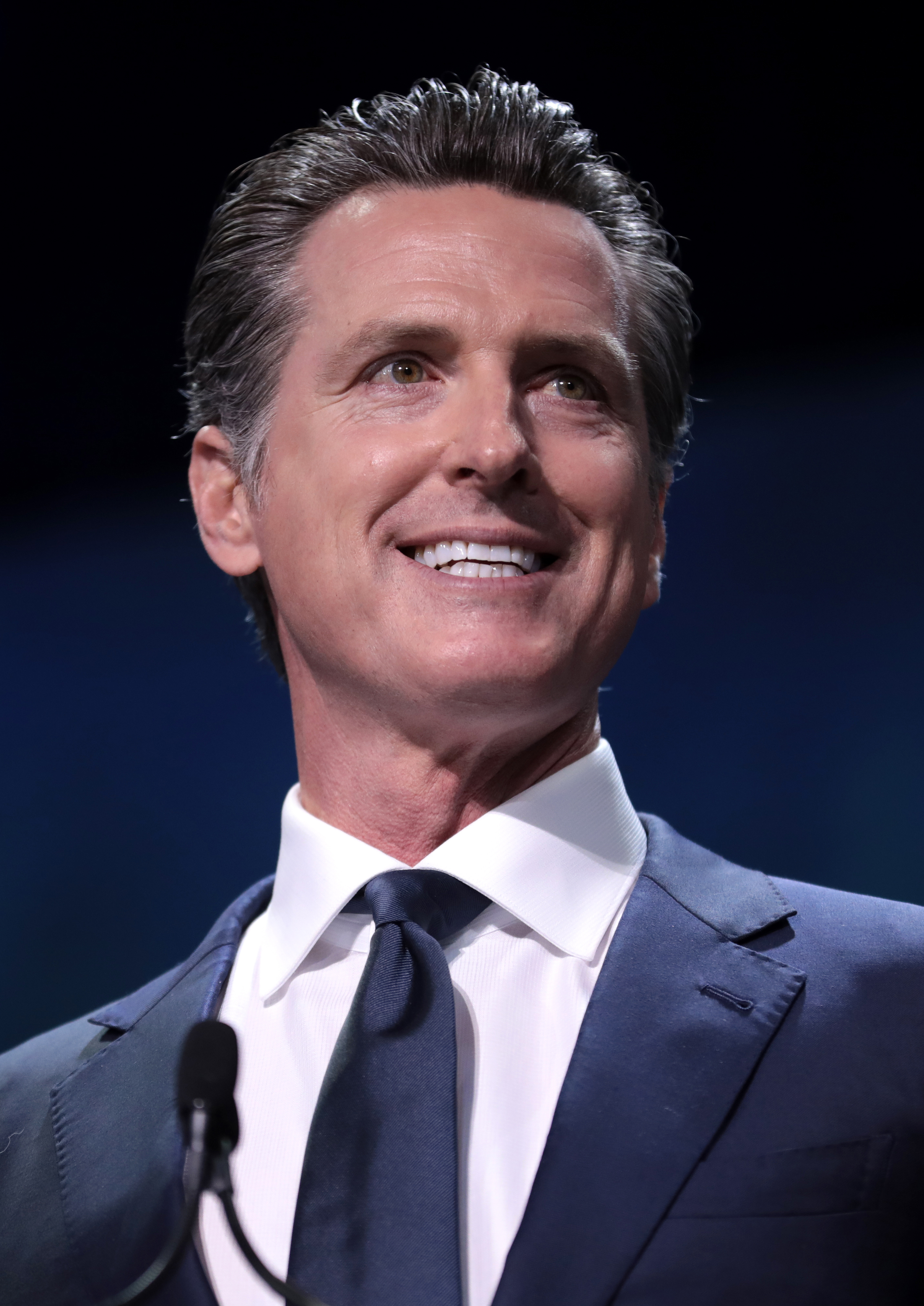
Gavin Newsom

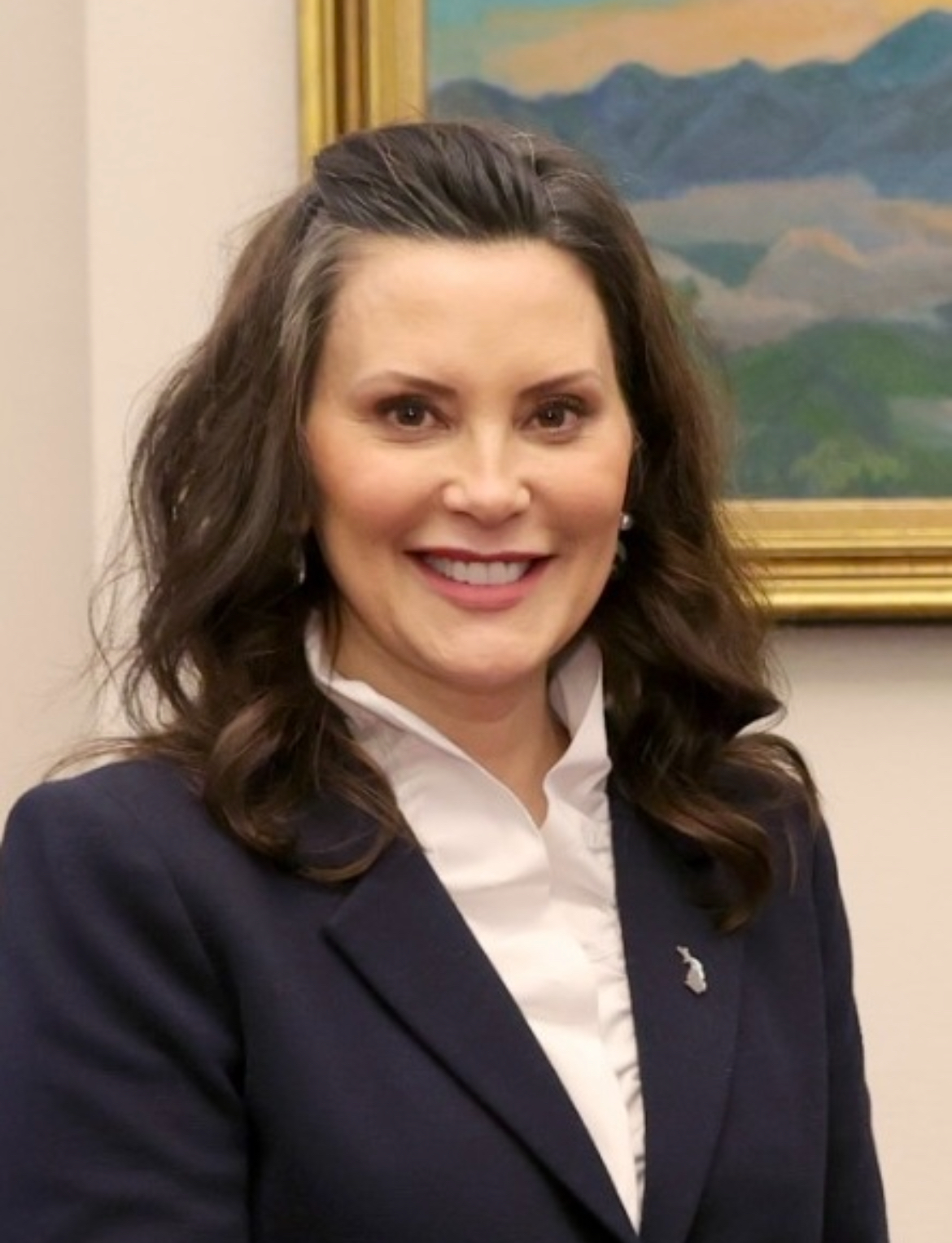
Gretchen Whitmer

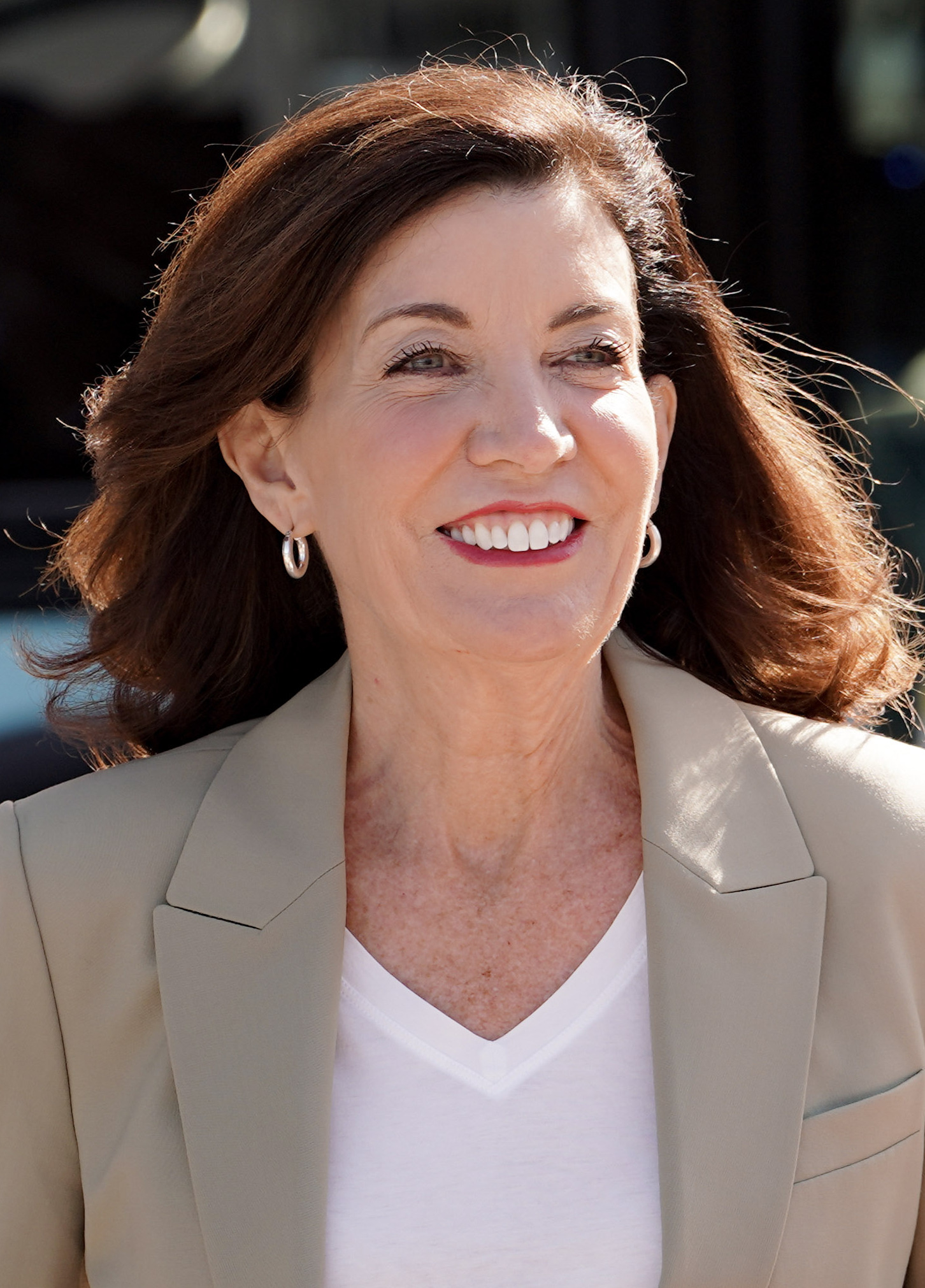
Kathy Hochul

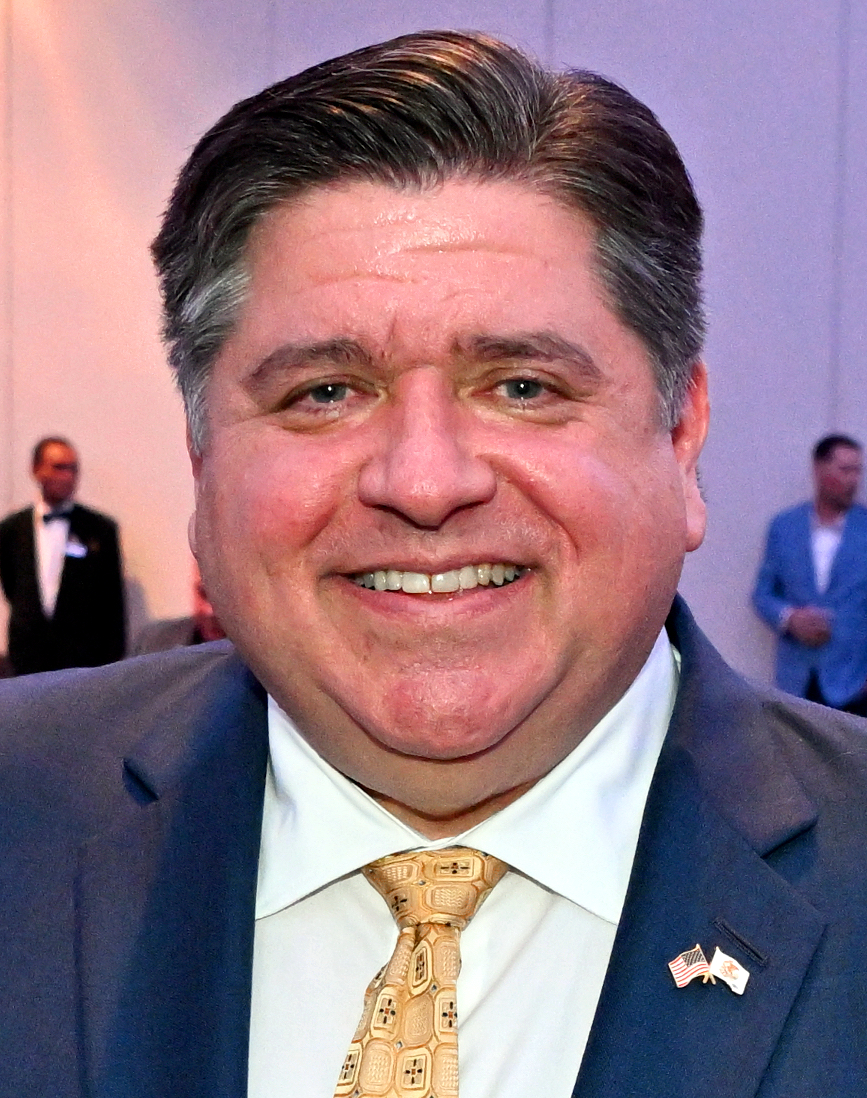
J. B. Pritzker

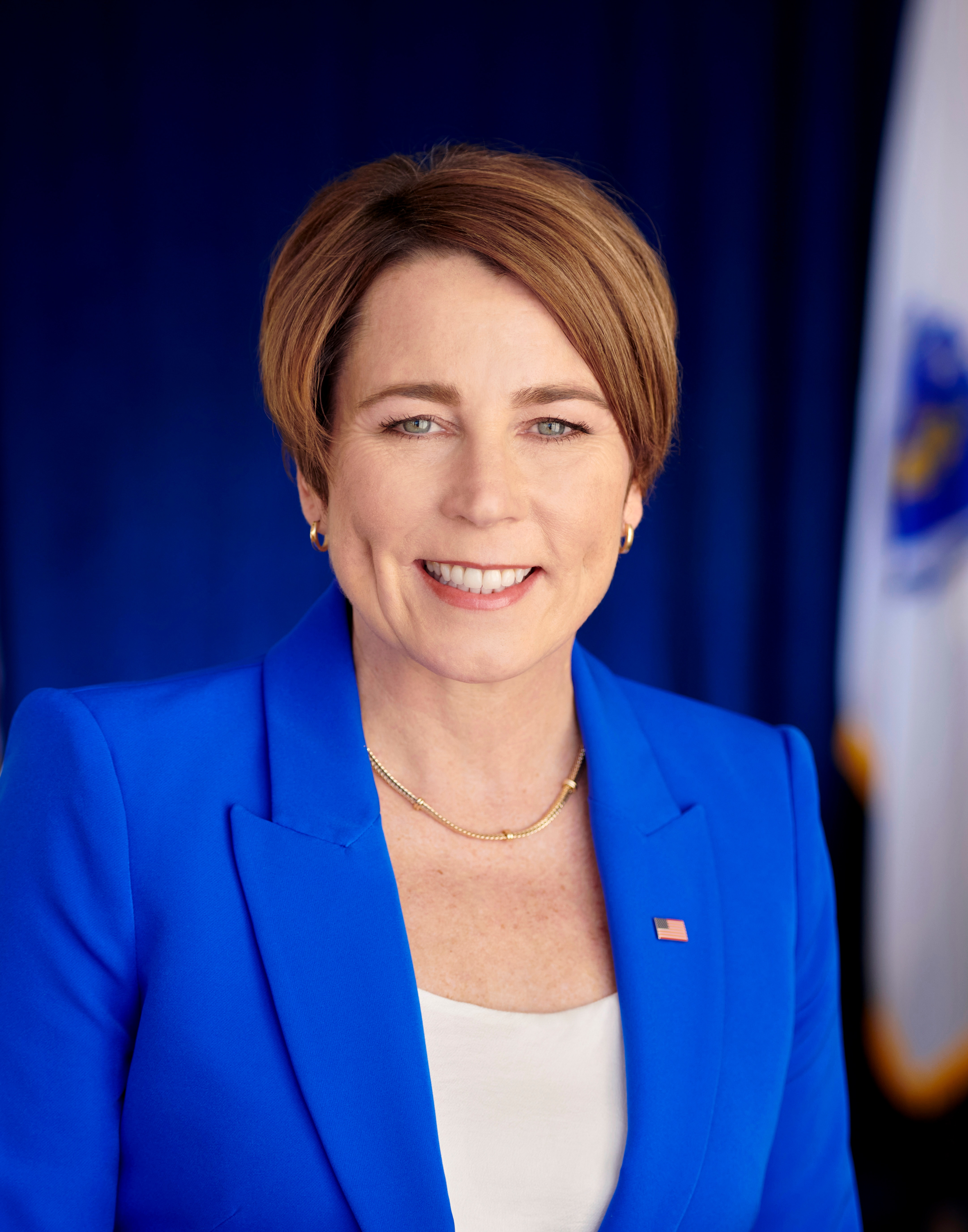
Maura Healey

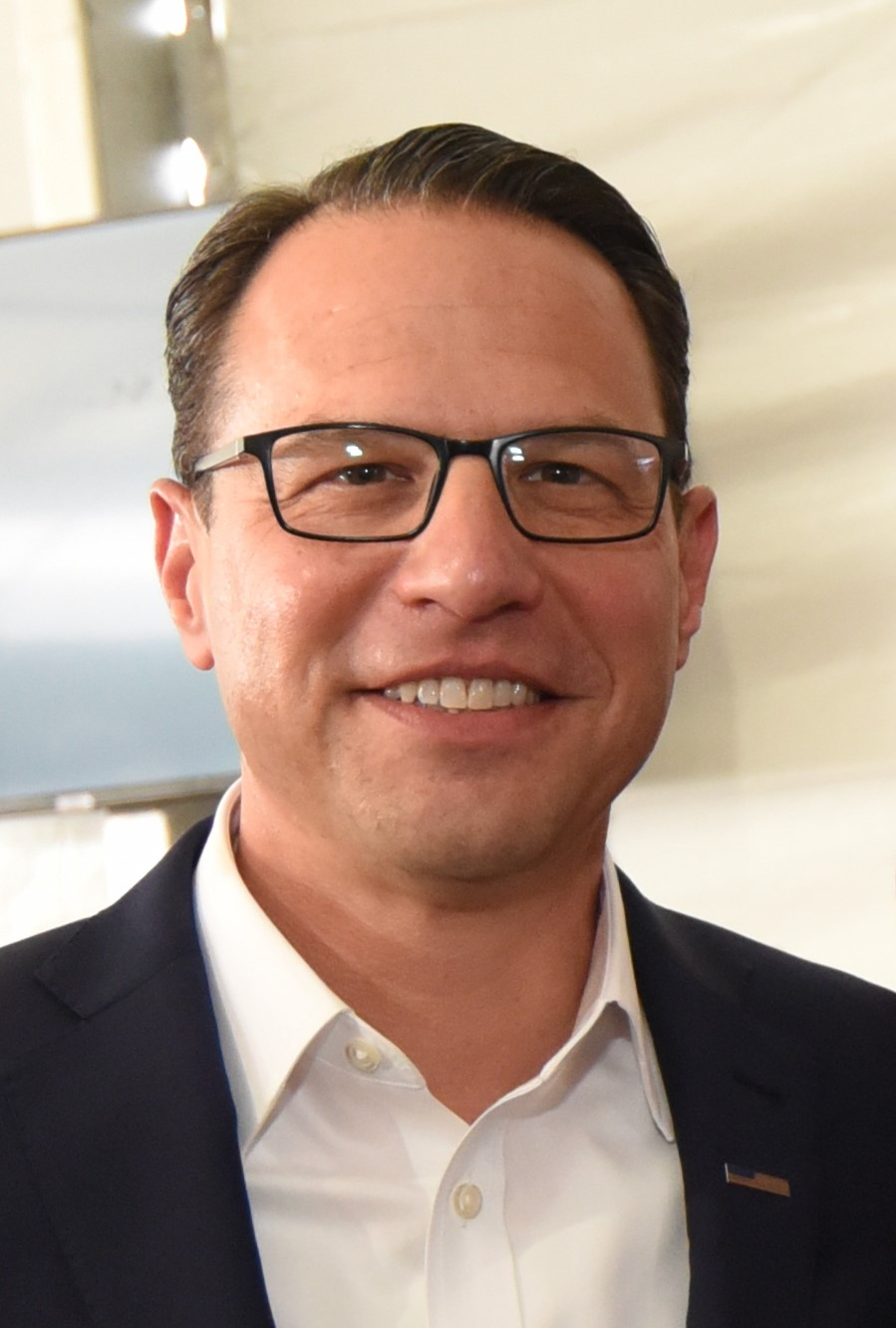
Josh Shapiro

==== Current ====
- Andy Beshear, governor of Kentucky (2019–present), Attorney General of Kentucky (2016–2019)
- John Carney, governor of Delaware (2017–present); U.S. representative for DE-AL (2011–2017); lieutenant governor of Delaware (2001–2009)
- Roy Cooper, governor of North Carolina (2017–present); North Carolina Attorney General (2001–2017)
- Tony Evers, governor of Wisconsin (2019–present); Public Instruction of Wisconsin (2009–2019)
- Josh Green, governor of Hawaii (2022–present); lieutenant governor of Hawaii (2018–2022)
- Maura Healey, governor of Massachusetts (2023–present); Attorney General of Massachusetts (2015–2023)
- Katie Hobbs, governor of Arizona (2023–present); Secretary of State of Arizona (2019–2023)
- Kathy Hochul, governor of New York (2021–present); lieutenant governor of New York (2015–2021); U.S. representative for NY-26 (2011–2013)
- Jay Inslee, governor of Washington (2013–present); U.S. representative for WA-01 (1999–2012)
- Laura Kelly, governor of Kansas (2019–present)
- Tina Kotek, governor of Oregon (2023–present)
- ~~Ned Lamont, governor of Connecticut (2019–present); Democratic nominee for U.S. senator from Connecticut in 2006~~ (supported calls for Biden to withdraw)
- Michelle Lujan Grisham, governor of New Mexico (2019–present); U.S. representative for NM-01 (2013–2019)
- Dan McKee, governor of Rhode Island (2021–present); lieutenant governor of Rhode Island (2015–2021)
- Janet Mills, governor of Maine (2019–present); Attorney General of Maine (2013–2019; 2009–2011)
- Wes Moore, governor of Maryland (2023–present)
- Phil Murphy, governor of New Jersey (2018–present); U.S. Ambassador to Germany (2009–2013)
- Gavin Newsom, governor of California (2019–present); lieutenant governor of California (2011–2019); Mayor of San Francisco (2004–2011)
- Pedro Pierluisi, governor of Puerto Rico (2021–present)
- Jared Polis, governor of Colorado (2019–present); U.S. representative for CO-02 (2009–2019)
- J. B. Pritzker, governor of Illinois (2019–present)
- Josh Shapiro, governor of Pennsylvania (2023–present); Attorney General of Pennsylvania (2017–2023)
- Tim Walz, governor of Minnesota (2019–present); U.S. representative for MN-01 (2007–2019)
- Gretchen Whitmer, governor of Michigan (2019–present)

==== Former ====
- Phil Bredesen, governor of Tennessee (2003–2011); mayor of Nashville (1991–1999); Democratic nominee for U.S. senator from Tennessee in 2018
- Steve Bullock, governor of Montana (2013–2021); Democratic nominee for U.S. senator from Montana in 2020 and Democratic candidate for U.S. president in 2020
- Terry McAuliffe, Virginia (2014–2018)
- Ralph Northam, Virginia (2018–2022), lieutenant governor of Virginia (2014–2018)
- Ed Rendell, Pennsylvania (2003–2011), mayor of Philadelphia (1992–2000)
- Steve Sisolak, governor of Nevada (2019–2023)

=== Lieutenant governors ===
==== Current ====
- Susan Bysiewicz, Connecticut (2019–present)
- Austin Davis, Pennsylvania (2023–present)
- Peggy Flanagan, Minnesota (2019–present)
- Garlin Gilchrist, Michigan (2019–present)
- Eleni Kounalakis, California (2019–present); U.S. Ambassador to Hungary (2010–2013)
- Sabina Matos, Rhode Island (2021–present)
- Sara Rodriguez, Wisconsin (2023–present)

==== Former ====
- ~~Geoff Duncan, Georgia (2019–2023) (Republican)~~ (withdrew endorsement)
- Kathleen Kennedy Townsend, Maryland (1995–2003), daughter of Robert F. Kennedy and sibling of Robert F. Kennedy Jr.

=== Secretaries of state ===
- Jocelyn Benson, Michigan (2019–present)
- Sarah Godlewski, Wisconsin (2023–present), State Treasurer of Wisconsin (2019–2023)

=== Attorneys general ===
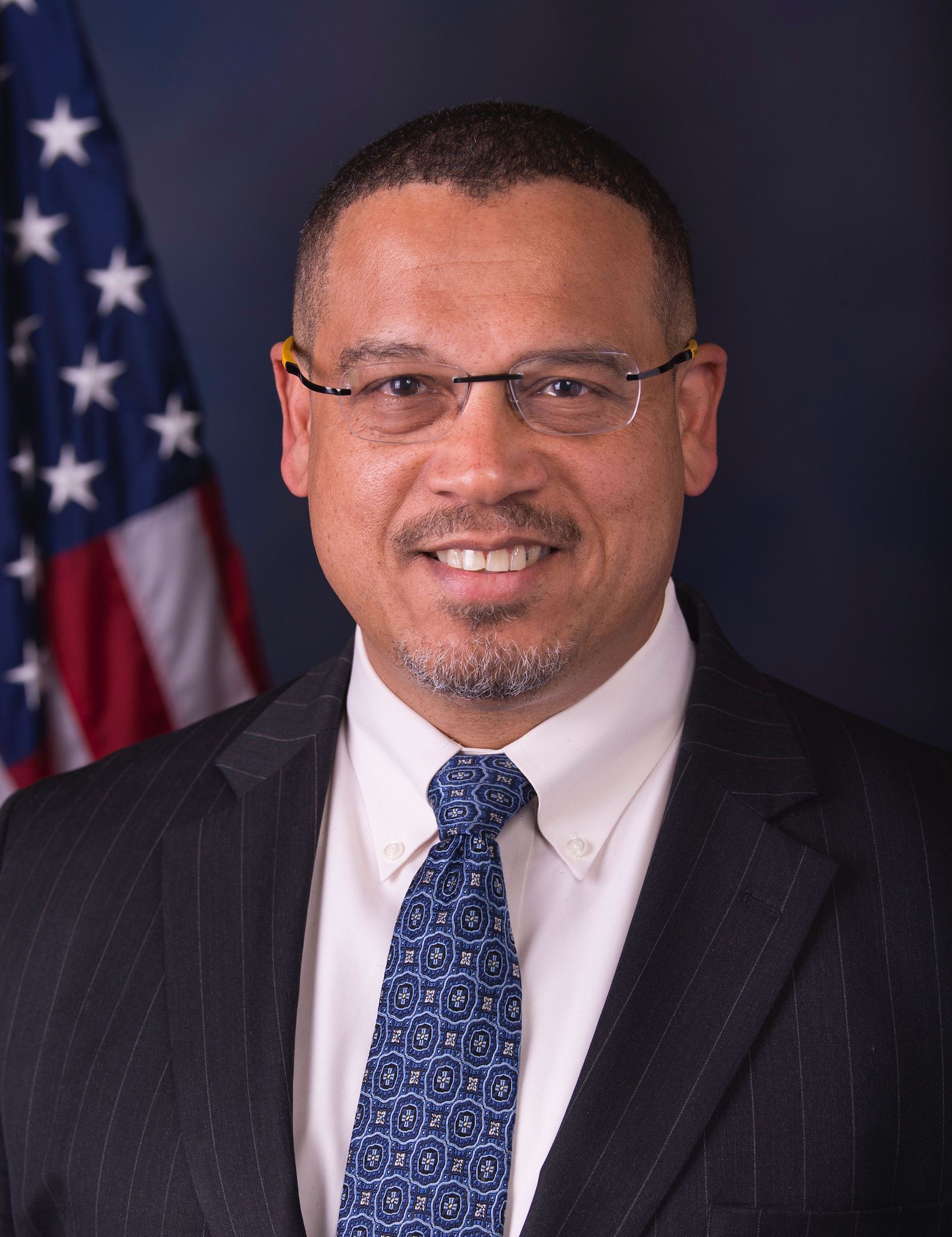
Keith Ellison

- Andrea Campbell, Massachusetts (2023–present)
- Keith Ellison, Minnesota (2019–present), U.S. representative for MN-05 (2007–2019)
- Bob Ferguson, Washington (2013–present), candidate for governor of Washington in 2024
- Aaron D. Ford, Nevada (2019–present)
- Josh Kaul, Wisconsin (2019–present)
- Josh Stein, North Carolina (2017–present), nominee for governor of North Carolina in 2024

=== State superintendents ===
- Jill Underly, Wisconsin (2021–present)

== State legislators ==
- Susan Almy, New Hampshire House of Representatives from Grafton District 17 (2022–present)
- Debra Altschiller, New Hampshire State Senate 24th district (2022–present)
- Sarah Anthony, Michigan Senate from the 21st district (2023–present)
- Lamont Bagby, Virginia Senate from the 14th district (2024–present)
- Heather Baldwin, New Hampshire House of Representatives from Grafton District 4 (2022–present)
- Luz Bay, New Hampshire House of Representatives from Strafford District 21 (2022–present)
- Donald J. Bouchard, New Hampshire House of Representatives from Hillsborough District 24 (2022–present)
- Amanda Bouldin, New Hampshire House of Representatives from Hillsborough District 12 (2015–present)
- Angela Brennan, New Hampshire House of Representatives from Merrimack District 9 (2022–present)
- Shannon Chandley, New Hampshire State Senate 11th district (2022–present)
- John Cloutier, New Hampshire House of Representatives from Sullivan District 6 (1992–present)
- Patricia Cornell, New Hampshire House of Representatives from Hillsborough District 22 (2022–present)
- Lou D'Allesandro, New Hampshire State Senate 20th district (1998–present)
- Tameika Isaac Devine, South Carolina Senate from District 19 (2024–present)
- Charlotte DiLorenzo, New Hampshire House of Representatives from Rockingham District 10 (2022–present)
- Fabian Doñate, Nevada State Senate from District 10 (2021–present)
- Sherry Dutzy, New Hampshire House of Representatives from Hillsborough District 6 (2018–present)
- Susan Elberger, New Hampshire House of Representatives from Hillsborough District 5 (2022–present)
- Sarah Elfreth, Maryland State Senate from 30th District (2019–present)
- Jason Esteves, Georgia State Senate from the 6th district (2023–present)
- Donovan Fenton, New Hampshire State Senate 10th district (2022–present)
- Dru Fox, New Hampshire House of Representatives from Cheshire District 2 (2022–present)
- Loren Foxx, New Hampshire House of Representatives from Hillsborough District 2 (2022–present)
- Nicholas Germana, New Hampshire House of Representatives from Cheshire District 1 (2022–present)
- Merryl Gibbs, New Hampshire House of Representatives from Merrimack District 23 (2022–present)
- Chuck Grassie, New Hampshire House of Representatives from Strafford District 8 (2016–2022, 2023–present)
- Jessica Grill, New Hampshire House of Representatives from Hillsborough District 18 (2022–present)
- Jaci Grote, New Hampshire House of Representatives from Rockingham District 24 (2018–present)
- Mary Hakken-Phillips, New Hampshire House of Representatives from Grafton District 12 (2022–present)
- Joan Hamblet, New Hampshire House of Representatives from Rockingham District 26 (2022–present)
- Linda Harriott-Gathright, New Hampshire House of Representatives from Hillsborough District 10 (2018–present)
- Molly Howard, New Hampshire House of Representatives from Hillsborough District 31 (2022–present)
- Steven Howe, Kansas House of Representatives from District 71 (2021–Present) (Republican)
- David Huot, New Hampshire House of Representatives from Belknap District 5 (1971–1974, 2016–2020, 2022–present)
- Adriane Johnson, Illinois state senator from the 30th district (2020–present)
- Shevrin Jones, Florida state senator from the 35th district (2020–present), state representative from the 101st district (2012–2020)
- Malcolm Kenyatta, Pennsylvania state representative from the 103rd district (2019–present), candidate for United States Senate in 2022
- Christal Lloyd, New Hampshire House of Representatives from Hillsborough District 8 (2022–present)
- Patrick Long, New Hampshire House of Representatives from Hillsborough District 23 (2022–present)
- Latha Mangipudi, New Hampshire House of Representatives from Hillsborough District 11 (2022–present)
- John Mannion, New York State Senate from the 50th District (2020–present)
- Rebecca McWilliams, New Hampshire House of Representatives from Merrimack District 30 (2022–present)
- David Meuse, New Hampshire House of Representatives from Rockingham District 37 (2022–present)
- Russell Muirhead, New Hampshire House of Representatives from Grafton District 12 (2020–present)
- Chris Muns, New Hampshire House of Representatives from Rockingham District 29 (2022–present)
- Nancy Murphy, New Hampshire House of Representatives from Hillsborough District 12 (2022–present)
- Allisandra Murray, New Hampshire House of Representatives from Hillsborough District 20 (2022–present)
- Jodi Newell, New Hampshire House of Representatives from Cheshire District 4 (2022–present)
- Veronica Paiz, Michigan State House District 11 (2023–Present)
- Lucius Parshall, New Hampshire House of Representatives from Cheshire District 8 (2022–present)
- Rebecca Perkins Kwoka, New Hampshire State Senate 21st district (2020–present)
- David Preece, New Hampshire House of Representatives from Hillsborough District 17 (2022–present)
- Suzanne Prentiss, New Hampshire State Senate 5th district (2020–present)
- Cindy Rosenwald, New Hampshire State Senate 13th district (2018–present)
- Kelda Roys, Wisconsin State Senate from 26th District (2020–present)
- Rosemarie Rung, New Hampshire House of Representatives from Hillsborough District 12 (2018–present)
- Steve Shurtleff, New Hampshire state representative from the 11th district, Merrimack (2004–present) and former speaker of the New Hampshire House of Representatives (2018–2020)
- Tony Simone, New York State Assembly from the 75th district (2023–Present)
- Alexis Simpson, New Hampshire House of Representatives from Rockingham District 33 (2022–present)
- Marjorie Smith, New Hampshire House of Representatives from Strafford District 10 (2022–present)
- Ismail Smith-Wade-El, Pennsylvania House of Representatives from the 49th district (2022–present)
- Mike Sturla, Pennsylvania House of Representatives from the 96th district (1991–present)
- Brian Sullivan, New Hampshire House of Representatives from Sullivan District 1 (2017–present)
- Laura Telerski, New Hampshire House of Representatives from Hillsborough District 11 (2022–present)
- Wendy Thomas, New Hampshire House of Representatives from Hillsborough District 12 (2022–present)
- Amanda Toll, New Hampshire House of Representatives from Cheshire District 15 (2020–present)
- Mark Vallone, New Hampshire House of Representatives from Rockingham District 5 (2022–present), New Hampshire House of Representatives from Rockingham District 9 (2018–2020)
- Joe Vogel, Maryland House of Delegates from the 17th district (2023–present)
- David Watters, New Hampshire State Senate 4th district (2012–present)
- Lucy Weber, New Hampshire House of Representatives from Cheshire District 5 (2006–present)
- Becky Whitley, New Hampshire State Senate 15th district (2020–present)
- Matthew Wilhelm, New Hampshire House of Representatives from Hillsborough District 40 (2020–present)
- Stephen Woodcock, New Hampshire House of Representatives from Carroll District 1 (2022–present)

=== Former ===
- Caroletta Alicea, New Hampshire House of Representatives from Merrimack District 8 (2020–2022)
- Hala Ayala, Virginia House of Delegates from District 51 (2018–2022), Nominee for 2021 Virginia lieutenant gubernatorial election
- Christy Bartlett, New Hampshire House of Representatives from Merrimack District 19 (2012–2022)
- Paul Berch, New Hampshire House of Representatives from Cheshire District 1 (2012–2022)
- Skip Berrien, New Hampshire House of Representatives from Rockingham District 18 (2014–2020)
- Peter Burling, New Hampshire State Senate
- Ed Butler, New Hampshire House of Representatives from Carrol District 7 (2012–2020)
- Tim Butterworth, New Hampshire House of Representatives from Cheshire District 4 (2006–2010)
- Jason Carter, Georgia State Senate from District 42 (2010–2015)
- Jackie Cilley, New Hampshire House of Representatives from Strafford District 4 (2014–2018), New Hampshire State Senate from District 6 (2007–2010)
- Aaron Coleman, Kansas House of Representatives from the 37th district 2021–2023
- David Cote, New Hampshire House of Representatives from Hillsborough District 3 (1982–2023)
- Manny Espita, New Hampshire House of Representatives from Hillsborough District 31 (2018–2022)
- La Shawn Ford, Illinois House of Representatives from the 8th district (2007–present)
- Susan Ford, New Hampshire House of Representatives from Grafton District 3 (2018–2020)
- Juan Eugenio Hernández Mayoral, member of the Puerto Rico Senate at-large (2005–2013) (Popular Democratic Party)
- Molly Kelly, New Hampshire State Senate from District 10 (2006–2016)
- Bette Laskey, New Hampshire State Senate from District 13 (2008–2010, 2012–2018), New Hampshire House of Representatives from Hillsborough District 26 (1998–2008)
- Melanie Levesque, New Hampshire State Senate from District 12 (2018–2020), New Hampshire House of Representatives from Hillsborough District 26 (2012–2014), New Hampshire House of Representatives from Hillsborough District 5 (2006–2010)
- Liz McConnell, New Hampshire House of Representatives from Rockingham District 11 (2018–2020)
- Patricia McMahon, New Hampshire House of Representatives from Merrimack District 3 (2004–2010)
- Richard McNamara, New Hampshire House of Representatives from Hillsborough District 38 (2012–2018)
- Mindi Messmer, New Hampshire House of Representatives from Rockingham District 24 (2016–2018)
- Jon Morgan, New Hampshire State Senate from District 23 (2018–2020)
- Sue Mullen, New Hampshire House of Representatives from Hillsborough District 7 (2018–2022)
- William Pearson, New Hampshire House of Representatives from Cheshire District 16 (2016–2020)
- Jay Phinizy, New Hampshire House of Representatives (1998–2008)
- Marjorie Porter, New Hampshire House of Representatives from Hillsborough District 1 (2010–2022)
- Tom Sherman, New Hampshire State Senate District 24 (2018–2022), New Hampshire House of Representatives from Hillsborough District 11 (2012–2016)
- Robin Vogt, New Hampshire House of Representatives from Rockingham District 21 (2022–2023)
- Jackie Weatherspoon, New Hampshire House of Representatives

=== Party Leaders ===
- Dan Blue, North Carolina Senate from the 14th district (2009–present), minority leader of the North Carolina Senate (2014–present)
- Derrick Graham, Minority Leader (2023–present) of the Kentucky House of Representatives from the 57th district (2003–present)
- Troy Jackson, president of the Maine Senate (2018–present) from the 1st district
- Joanna McClinton, Speaker (2023–present) of the Pennsylvania House of Representatives from the 191st district (2015–present)
- Gerald Neal, Minority Leader (2023–present) of the Kentucky Senate from the 33rd district (1989–present)
- Crystal Quade, Minority Leader (2019–present) of the Missouri House of Representatives from the 132nd district (2017–present), candidate for Governor in 2024
- Rachel Talbot Ross, Speaker (2022–present) of the Maine House of Representatives from the 118th district (2022–present)
- Donna Soucy, Minority Leader of the New Hampshire State Senate (2020–present), New Hampshire State Senate 18th district (2012–present), president of the New Hampshire State Senate (2018–2020), New Hampshire House of Representatives from Hillsborough District 42 (1992–1996), New Hampshire House of Representatives from Hillsborough District 39 (1990–1992)
- Joe Tate, Speaker (2023–2025) of the Michigan House of Representatives from the 10th district (2023–present)
- Mary Jane Wallner, Deputy Minority Leader of the New Hampshire House of Representatives (2022–present), New Hampshire House of Representatives from Merrimack District 10 (1980–present), Majority Leader of the New Hampshire House of Representatives (2007–2010)

==== Former ====
- Martha Fuller Clark, president pro tempore of the New Hampshire State Senate (2018–2020), New Hampshire State Senate District 21 (2012–2020), New Hampshire State Senate District 24 (2004–2010)
- Sylvia Larsen, president of the New Hampshire State Senate (2006–2010), New Hampshire State Senate District 15 (1994–2014)
- Terie Norelli, former Speaker of the New Hampshire House of Representatives (2006–2010) (2012–2014)

== Other state officials ==
=== Current ===
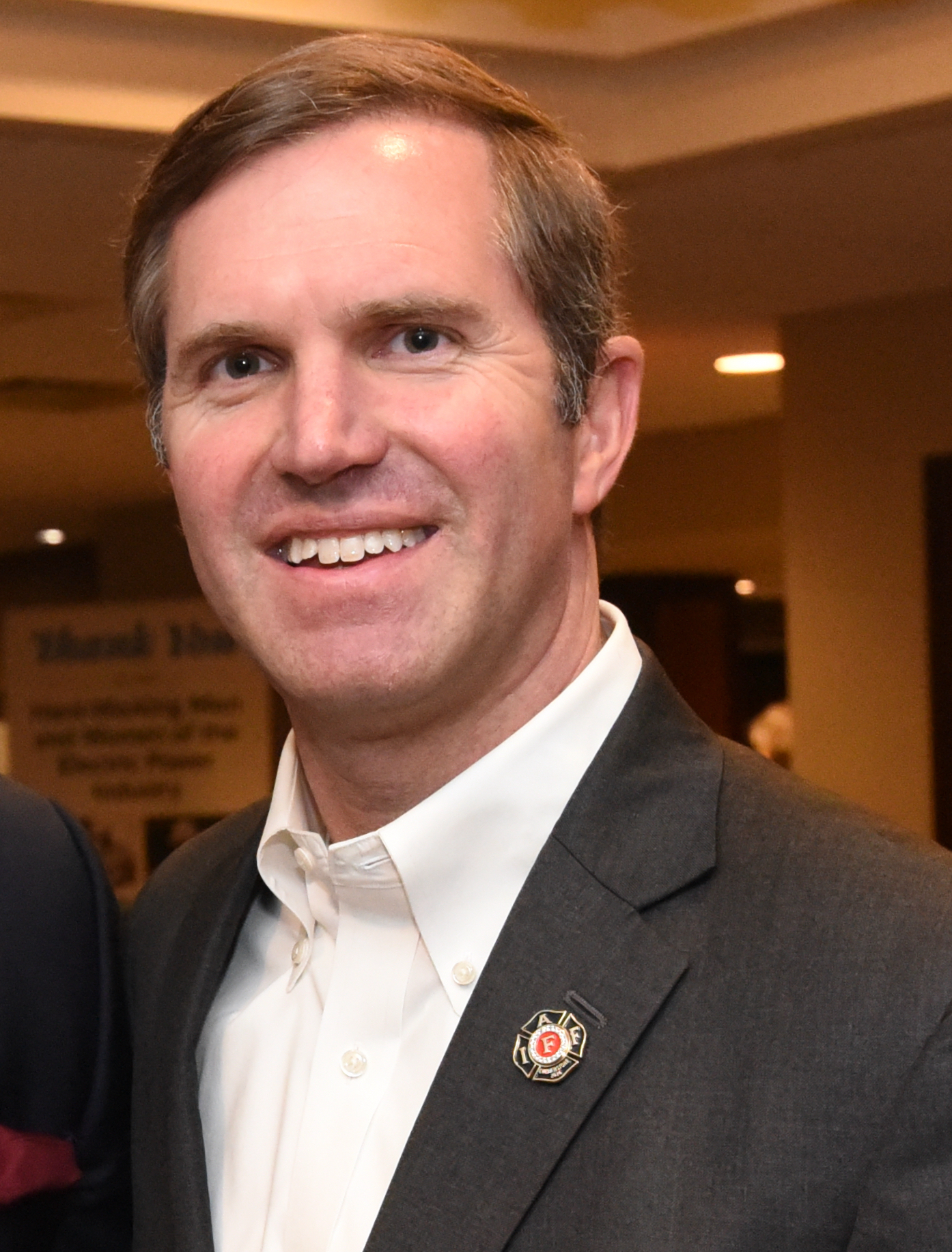
Andy Beshear

- Cinde Warmington, member of the New Hampshire Executive Council (2021–2025), candidate for governor in 2024

=== Former ===
- Dudley Dudley, member of the New Hampshire Executive Council (1976–1983), political activist
- Collin Van Ostern, member of the New Hampshire Executive Council (2013–2017), businessman

== Municipal and local officials ==
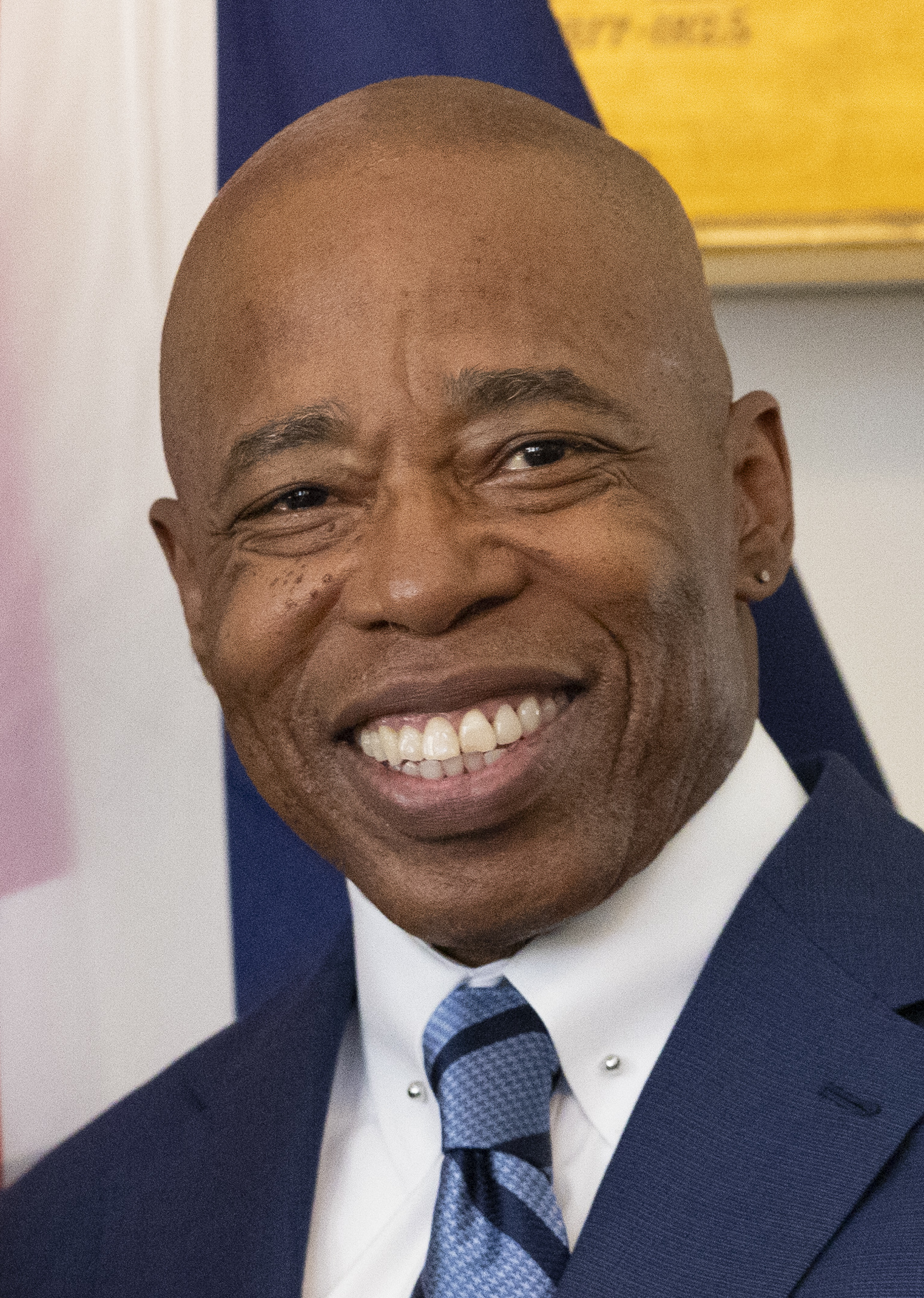
Eric Adams

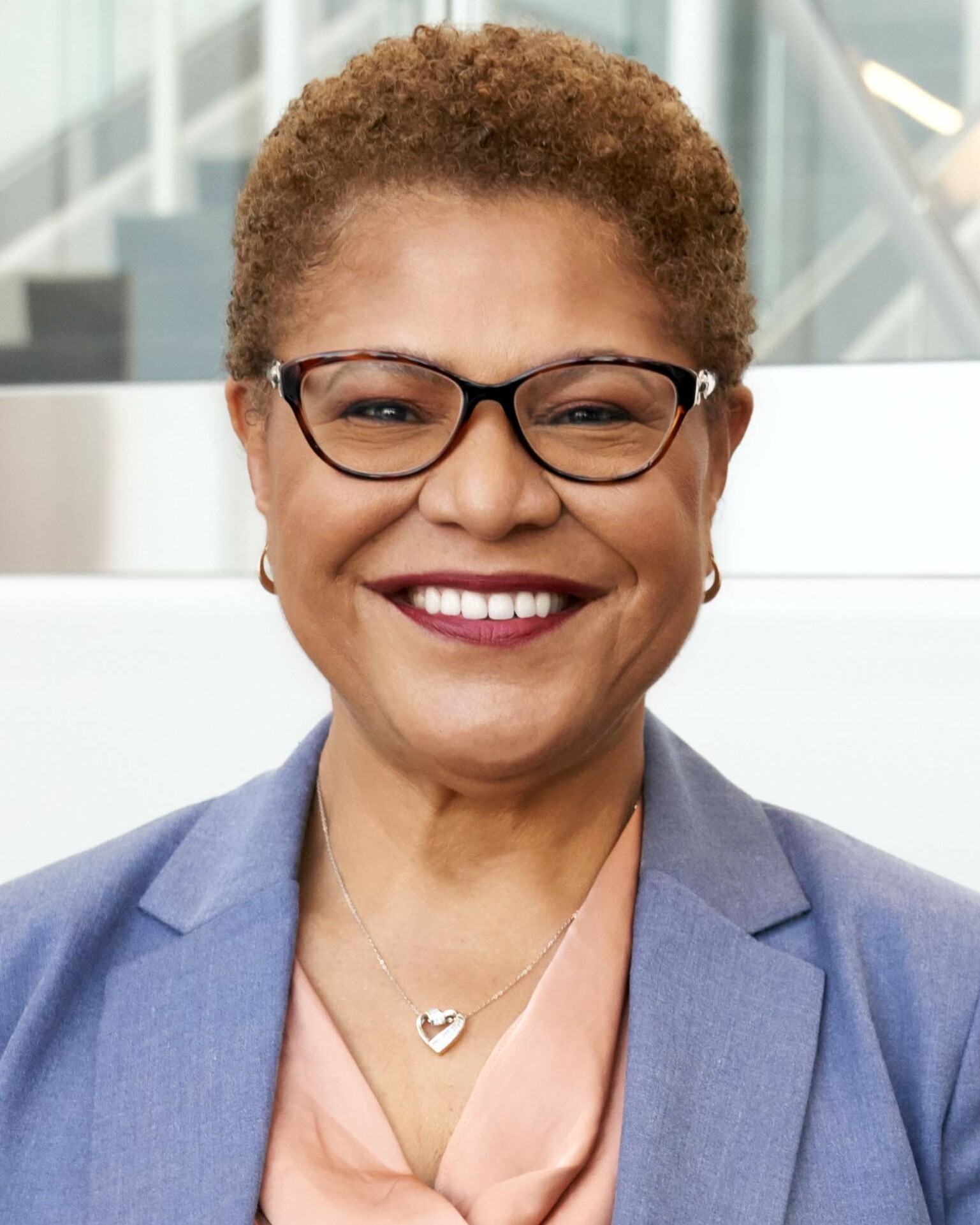
Karen Bass

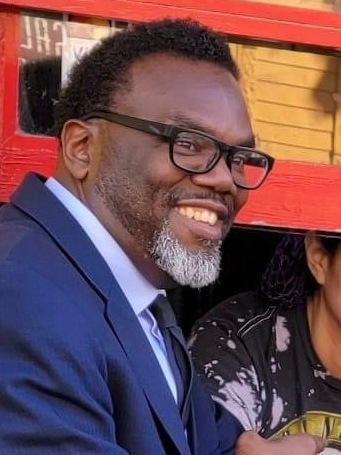
Brandon Johnson

=== Mayors ===
==== Current ====
- Eric Adams, 110th mayor of New York City, New York (2022–present)
- Karen Bass, 43rd mayor of Los Angeles, California (2022–present), U.S. representative for CA-33 (2011–13) and CA-37 (2013–22)
- J. Christian Bollwage, mayor of Elizabeth, New Jersey (1993–present)
- London Breed, 45th mayor of San Francisco, California (2018–2025)
- Daniella Cava, 8th mayor of Miami-Dade County (2020–present)
- Mitch Colvin, mayor of Fayetteville, North Carolina (2017–present)
- Donna Deegan, 9th mayor of Jacksonville, Florida (2023–present)
- Andre Dickens, 61st mayor of Atlanta, Georgia (2022–present)
- Mike Duggan, 75th mayor of Detroit, Michigan (2014–present)
- Malik Evans, 71st mayor of Rochester, New York (2022–present)
- Steven Fulop, 49th mayor of Jersey City, New Jersey (2013–present), candidate for governor of New Jersey in 2025
- Kate Gallego, 62nd mayor of Phoenix, Arizona (2019–present)
- Todd Gloria, 37th mayor of San Diego, California (2020–present)
- Craig Greenberg, 51st mayor of Louisville, Kentucky (2023–present)
- Brandon Johnson, 57th mayor of Chicago, Illinois (2023–present)
- Cavalier Johnson, 45th mayor of Milwaukee, Wisconsin (2022–present)
- Phillip Jones, 27th mayor of Newport News, Virginia (2023–present)
- Tishaura Jones, 47th mayor of St. Louis, Missouri (2021–present)
- Quinton Lucas, 55th mayor of Kansas City, Missouri (2019–present)
- Vi Lyles, 59th mayor of Charlotte, North Carolina (2017–present)
- Erin Mendenhall, mayor of Salt Lake City, Utah (2020–present)
- Ron Nirenberg, mayor of San Antonio, Texas (2017–present) (Independent)
- Cherelle Parker, 100th mayor of Philadelphia, Pennsylvania (2024–present)
- Aftab Pureval, 70th mayor of Cincinnati, Ohio (2022–present)
- Satya Rhodes-Conway, 58th mayor of Madison, Wisconsin (2019–present)
- Regina Romero, 42nd mayor of Tucson, Arizona (2019–present)
- Andy Schor, 52nd mayor of Lansing, Michigan (2018–present)
- Brandon Scott, 53rd mayor of Baltimore, Maryland (2020–present)
- Kathy Sheehan, 75th mayor of Albany, New York (2014–present)
- Darrell Steinberg, 56th mayor of Sacramento, California (2016–present)
- Levar Stoney, 80th mayor of Richmond, Virginia (2017–present)
- Leonardo Williams, 41st mayor of Durham, North Carolina (2023–present)
- Wanda Williams, 39th mayor of Harrisburg, Pennsylvania (2022–present)
- Randall Woodfin, 34th mayor of Birmingham, Alabama (2017–present)
- Michelle Wu, 54th mayor of Boston, Massachusetts (2021–present)

==== Former ====
- Michael Bloomberg, 108th mayor of New York City (2002–2014), 2020 presidential candidate
- Joyce Craig, mayor of Manchester, New Hampshire (2017–2024), candidate for New Hampshire governor in 2024
- Bill de Blasio, 109th mayor of New York City (2014–2022), 2020 presidential candidate
- Keisha Lance Bottoms, 60th mayor of Atlanta (2018–2022)
- Steve Marchand, mayor of Portsmouth, New Hampshire (2006–2008)
- Nan Whaley, 56th mayor of Dayton, Ohio (2014–2022), nominee for governor of Ohio in 2022

=== County officials ===
- Angela Alsobrooks, county executive of Prince George's County, Maryland (2018–2025), nominee for U.S. senator from Maryland in 2024
- Lina Hidalgo, county judge of Harris County, Texas (2019–present)
- George Latimer, county executive of Westchester County, New York (2018–present)

=== Other ===
- Juli Briskman, Loudoun County Board of Supervisors from Algonkian (2020–present)
- Emma Mitts, Chicago City Council from the 37th ward (2000–present)

== Party officials ==
=== National ===
- Donna Brazile, former chair of the Democratic National Committee (2011, 2016–2017)
- Jaime Harrison, chair of the Democratic National Committee (2021–2025), chair of the South Carolina Democratic Party (2013–2017)
- Michael Steele, former chair of the Republican National Committee (2009–2011), Lieutenant Governor of Maryland (2003–2007) (Republican)

=== Statewide ===
- Lavora Barnes, chair of the Michigan Democratic Party (2019–2025)
- Yolanda Bejarano, chair of the Arizona Democratic Party (2023–2025)
- Anderson Clayton, chair of the North Carolina Democratic Party (2023–present)
- Nancy DiNardo, chair of the Connecticut Democratic Party (2005–2015, 2020–2025)
- Nikki Fried, chair of the Florida Democratic Party (2023–present), 12th Agriculture Commissioner of Florida (2019–2023)
- Gilberto Hinojosa, chair of the Texas Democratic Party (2012–2025), County Judge of Cameron County, Texas (1995–2007)
- Diane Lewis, chair of the Utah Democratic Party (2021–present)
- Ken Martin, chair of the Minnesota Democratic-Farmer-Labor Party (2011–2025)
- Daniele Monroe-Moreno, chair of the Nevada Democratic Party (2023–present)
- Lauren Necochea, chair of the Idaho Democratic Party (2022–present) and Idaho state representative from the 19th district (2019–present)
- Sharif Street, chair of the Pennsylvania Democratic Party (2022–present)
- Ben Wikler, chair of the Wisconsin Democratic Party (2019–present)

==== Former ====
- Jennifer Horn, chair of the New Hampshire Republican Party (2013–2017), co-founder of The Lincoln Project (Republican Until 2020, Independent)
- Kathy Sullivan, former chair of the New Hampshire Democratic Party (1999–2007)
- Chris Vance, 2016 nominee for Senate, chair of the Washington State Republican Party (2001–2006), Washington State Representative from District 31 (1991–1994) (Republican Until 2017, Independent)

== International officials ==
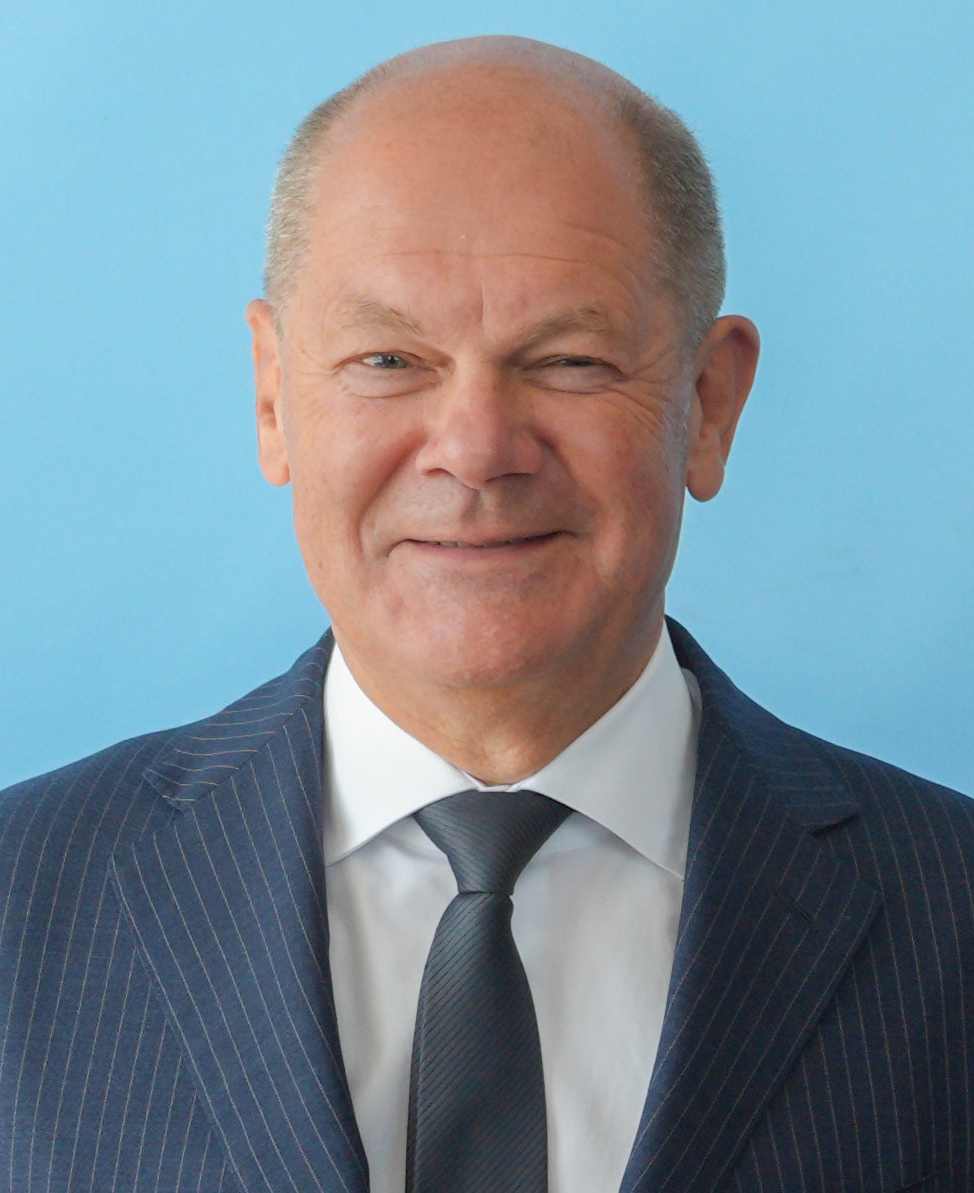
Olaf Scholz

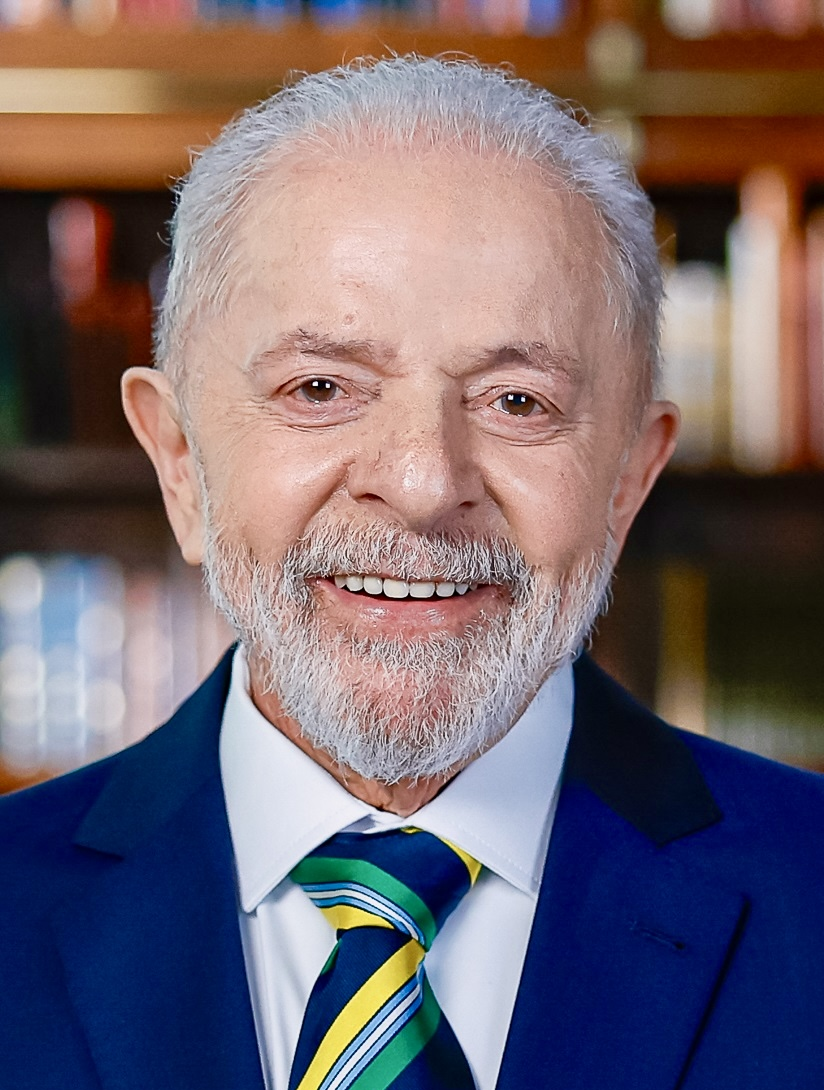
Lula da Silva

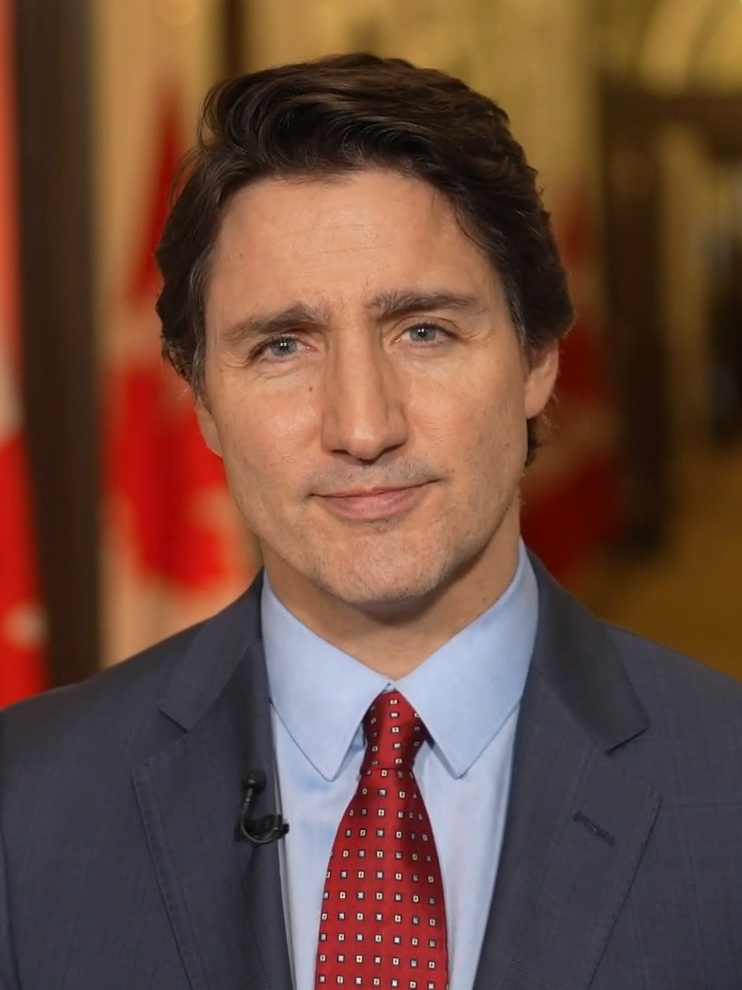
Justin Trudeau

=== Heads of state and government ===
==== Current ====
- Olaf Scholz, Chancellor of Germany (2021–2025), vice-chancellor of Germany (2018–2021) (Social Democratic Party)
- Lula da Silva, president of Brazil (2003–2010, 2023–present) (Workers' Party)
- Justin Trudeau, prime minister of Canada (2015–2025) (Liberal Party)

==== Former ====
- Micheál Martin, Tánaiste (2022–2025), Taoiseach (2020–2022, 2025–present) (Fianna Fáil)

== Organizations ==
=== State and county Democratic parties ===
- Democratic Party of Arizona
- Democratic Party of Arkansas
- Democratic Party of Colorado
- Democratic Party of Connecticut
- Democratic Party of Florida
- Democratic Party of Georgia
- Democratic Party of Illinois
  - Cook County Democratic Party
- Democratic Party of Indiana
- Maine Democratic Party
- Democratic Party of Maryland
- Democratic Party of Massachusetts
- Democratic Party of Michigan
- Democratic Party of Minnesota
- Democratic Party of Missouri
- Democratic Party of Nebraska
- Democratic Party of Nevada
- New Hampshire Democratic Party
- Democratic Party of New York
- Democratic Party of North Carolina
- Democratic Party of Ohio
- Democratic Party of Oregon
- Democratic Party of Pennsylvania
- South Carolina Democratic Party
- South Dakota Democratic Party
- Democratic Party of Tennessee
- Democratic Party of Texas
- Democratic Party of Virginia
- Democratic Party of Wisconsin

=== Political organizations ===
- AAPI Victory Fund
- Alliance for Retired Americans
- American Bridge 21st Century
- Asian American Action Fund
- ASPIRE PAC
- Blue Future
- BOLD PAC
- Brady Campaign
- Chesapeake Climate Action Network
- Collective PAC
- College Democrats of America
- The Council of Men
- Democratic Attorneys General Association
- The Democratic Coalition
- Democratic Majority for Israel
- Democratic Youth Coalition
- Democrats Abroad
- Dream for America
- EMILY's List
- End Citizens United
- Equality California
- Equality PAC
- Everytown for Gun Safety
- Fair Wisconsin
- Foreign Policy for America
- Giffords
- Grassroots Dems HQ
- Harvard College Democrats
- Harvey Milk LGBTQ Democratic Club
- High School Democrats of America
- Human Rights Campaign
- Indivisible
- J Street PAC
- Jewish Democratic Council of America
- Jr. Newtown Action Alliance
- Keep Arizona Blue
- Latino Victory Fund
- League of Conservation Voters
- Lincoln Project
- Moms Demand Action
- MoveOn
- NARAL Pro-Choice America
- National Center for Transgender Equality
- National Committee to Preserve Social Security and Medicare
- National Organization for Women
- National Security Leaders for America
- National United Committee to Protect Pensions
- Natural Resources Defense Council
- NextGen America PAC
- Newtown Action Alliance
- Path to Progress
- People's Alliance
- Planned Parenthood action fund
- Population Connection Action Fund
- Primary Pivot
- Priorities USA Action
- Replacements, Ltd. PAC
- Republican Accountability Project
- Republicans for the Rule of Law
- Sierra Club
- Silver State Equality
- Social Security Works PAC
- Somos PAC
- Stonewall Democrats of San Antonio
- Students Demand Action
- Team ENOUGH
- UnidosUS
- Unite the Country PAC
- Voices of Gen-Z
- Voters of Tomorrow
- VoteVets
- Voto Latino
- WelcomePAC
- Young Democrats of America

=== Newspapers ===
- The Austin Chronicle
- Baltimore Afro-American
- Bay Area Reporter
- The Boston Globe
- DemCast
- Eugene Weekly
- Houston Chronicle
- Las Vegas Sun
- Los Angeles Sentinel
- MSW Media
- The Onion (post-withdrawal)
- The Palm Beach Post
- San Antonio Express-News
- Santa Barbara Independent
- The Seattle Times
- Star Tribune
- Storm Lake Times (previously endorsed Asa Hutchinson)

=== Websites ===
- Daily Kos

== Labor unions ==
- Actors' Equity Association, representing 51,000
- AFL–CIO, representing 12,500,000
  - Michigan state AFL-CIO
  - New York State AFL–CIO
  - North Carolina State AFL–CIO representing 100,000
  - North Shore AFL–CIO
- Amalgamated Transit Union, representing 200,000
- American Federation of Government Employees, representing 750,000
  - AFGE Council 238
- American Federation of State, County and Municipal Employees, representing 1,600,000
  - AFSCME California
  - AFSCME Council 18
  - AFSCME Council 31
  - AFSCME Council 47
  - AFSCME Nevada
- American Federation of Teachers, representing 1,700,000
  - Ohio Federation of Teachers
- Brotherhood of Railroad Signalmen
- Communications Workers of America, representing 700,000
- International Alliance of Theatrical Stage Employees, representing 150,000
- International Association of Bridge, Structural, Ornamental and Reinforcing Iron Workers, representing 130,000
- International Association of Sheet Metal, Air, Rail and Transportation Workers, representing 203,000
- International Brotherhood of Electrical Workers, representing 775,000
  - IBEW Local 11
  - IBEW Local 103
  - IBEW Local 134
  - IBEW Local 180
  - IBEW Local 302
  - IBEW Local 340
  - IBEW Local 595
  - IBEW Local 617
  - IBEW Local 684
- International Federation of Professional and Technical Engineers, representing 80,000
- International Union of Bricklayers and Allied Craftworkers, representing 75,000
- International Union of Operating Engineers, representing 400,000
  - IUOE Local 399
- International Union of Painters and Allied Trades, representing 6,000
- Laborers' International Union of North America, representing 500,000
- National Air Traffic Controllers Association, representing 15,000
- National Association of Government Employees, representing 100,000
- National Education Association, representing 3,000,000
  - Ohio Education Association
- National Nurses United, representing 225,000
- North America's Building Trades Unions, representing 3,000,000
- Office and Professional Employees International Union
- Service Employees International Union, representing 2,000,000
  - SEIU United Healthcare Workers West
  - SEIU Local 1021
- Transport Workers Union of America, representing 155,000
- UNITE HERE, representing 300,000
- United Association of Journeymen and Apprentices of the Plumbing and Pipe Fitting Industry, representing 366,000
  - United Association Local 120
  - United Association Local 398
- United Auto Workers, representing 391,000
- United Farm Workers, representing 4,682
- United Steel Workers, representing 1,200,000
- Utility Workers Union of America

== Business leaders ==
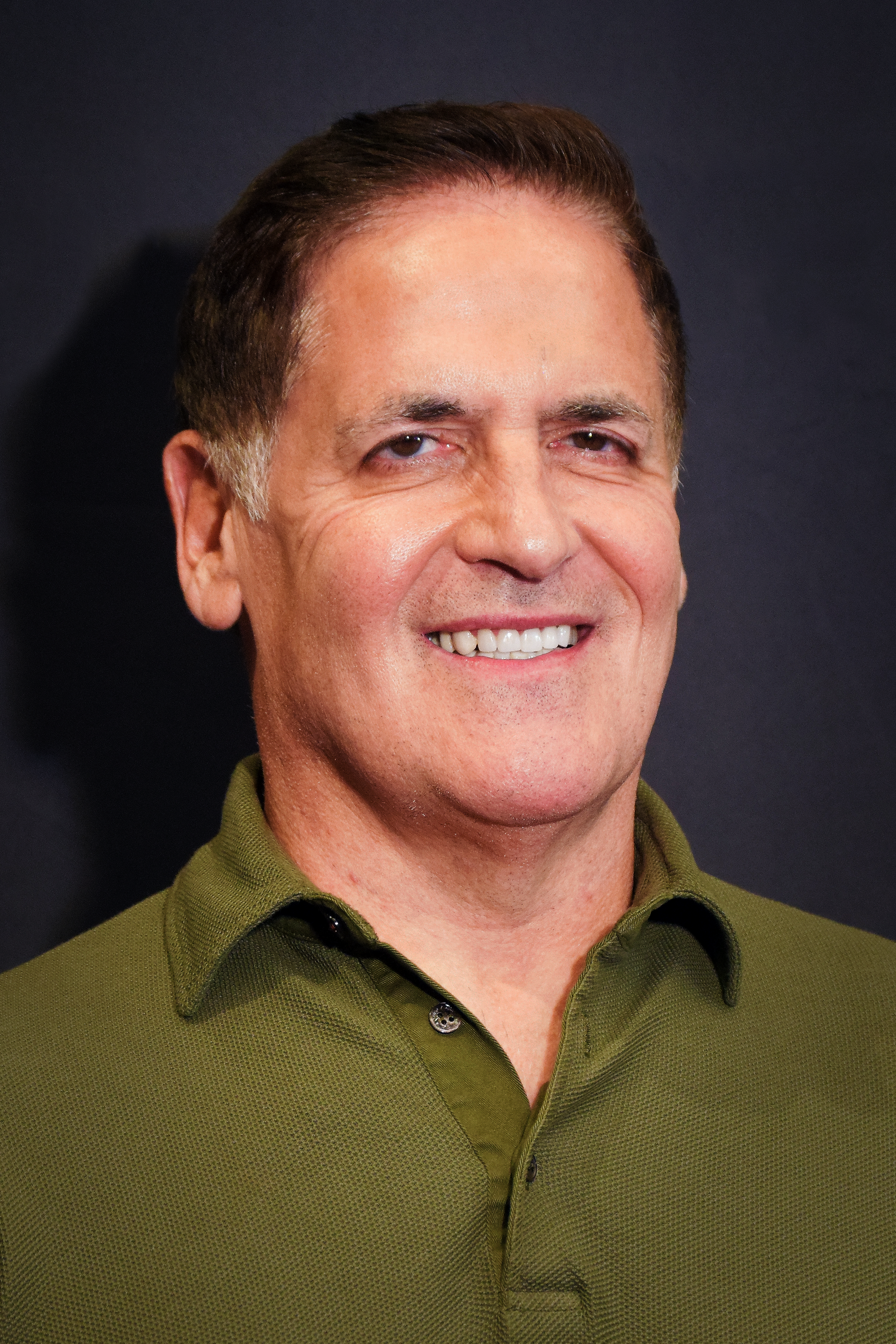
Mark Cuban

- Arthur Blank, co-founder of Home Depot
- Mark Cuban, investor and owner of the Dallas Mavericks (Independent)
- Mandana Dayani, businesswoman and activist
- Reid Hoffman, co-founder and executive chairman of LinkedIn
- Jeffrey Katzenberg, CEO of DreamWorks Animation
- Christopher G. Kennedy, chair of Joseph P. Kennedy Enterprises, Inc., son of Robert F. Kennedy and sibling of Robert F. Kennedy Jr.
- Jason Michael Palmer, entrepreneur and former 2024 Democratic candidate
- Haim Saban, businessman, media proprietor, and investor
- Harry E. Sloan, former chairman of Metro-Goldwyn-Mayer and SBS Broadcasting (Republican)
- Alexander Soros, philanthropist, son of George Soros
- Tom Steyer, hedge fund manager, liberal activist, philanthropist, 2020 candidate for president
- Donald Sussman, hedge fund executive

== Labor union leaders ==
- Brent Booker, general president of the Laborers' International Union of North America (2023–present)
- Terry Melvin, president of the Coalition of Black Trade Unionists
- Liz Shuler, president of the American Federation of Labor and Congress of Industrial Organizations (2021–present); Secretary-Treasurer of the AFL–CIO (2009–2021)
- Randi Weingarten, president of the American Federation of Teachers (2008–present); president of the United Federation of Teachers (1998–2008)

== Notable individuals ==
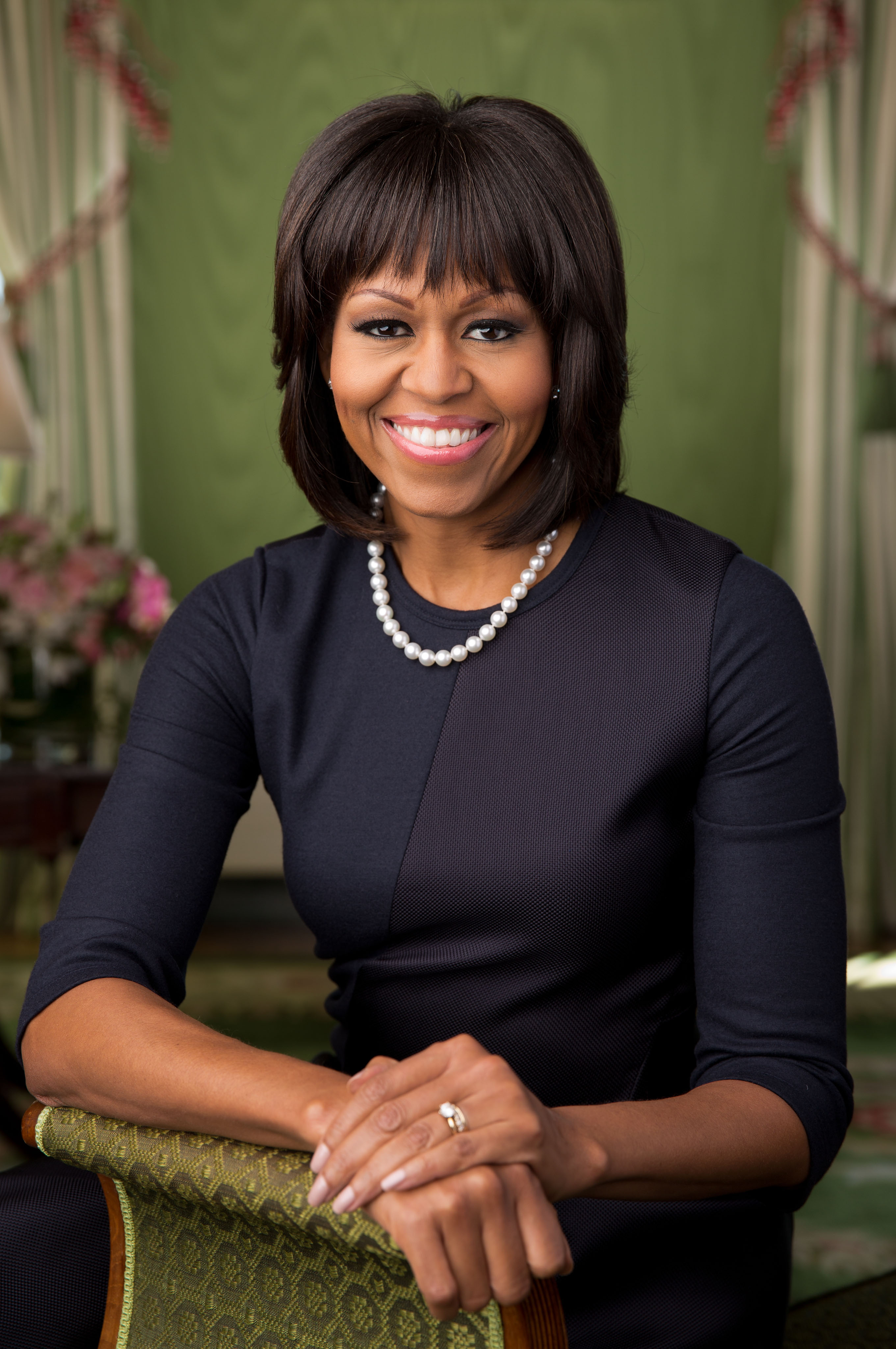
Michelle Obama

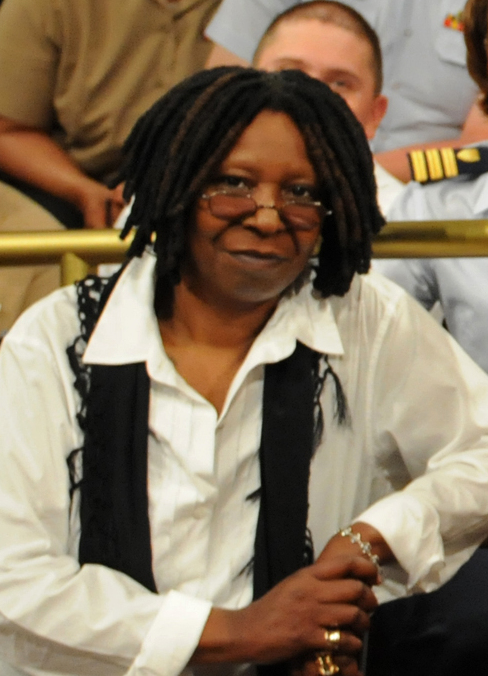
Whoopi Goldberg

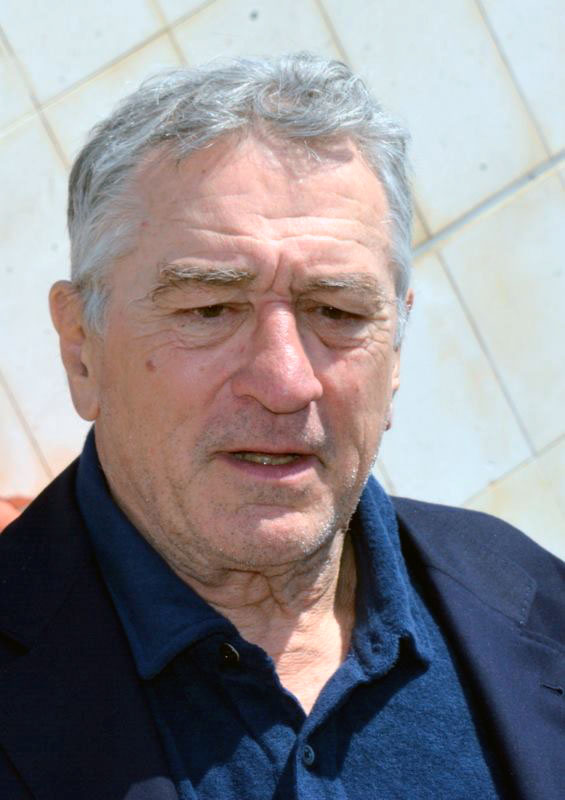
Robert De Niro

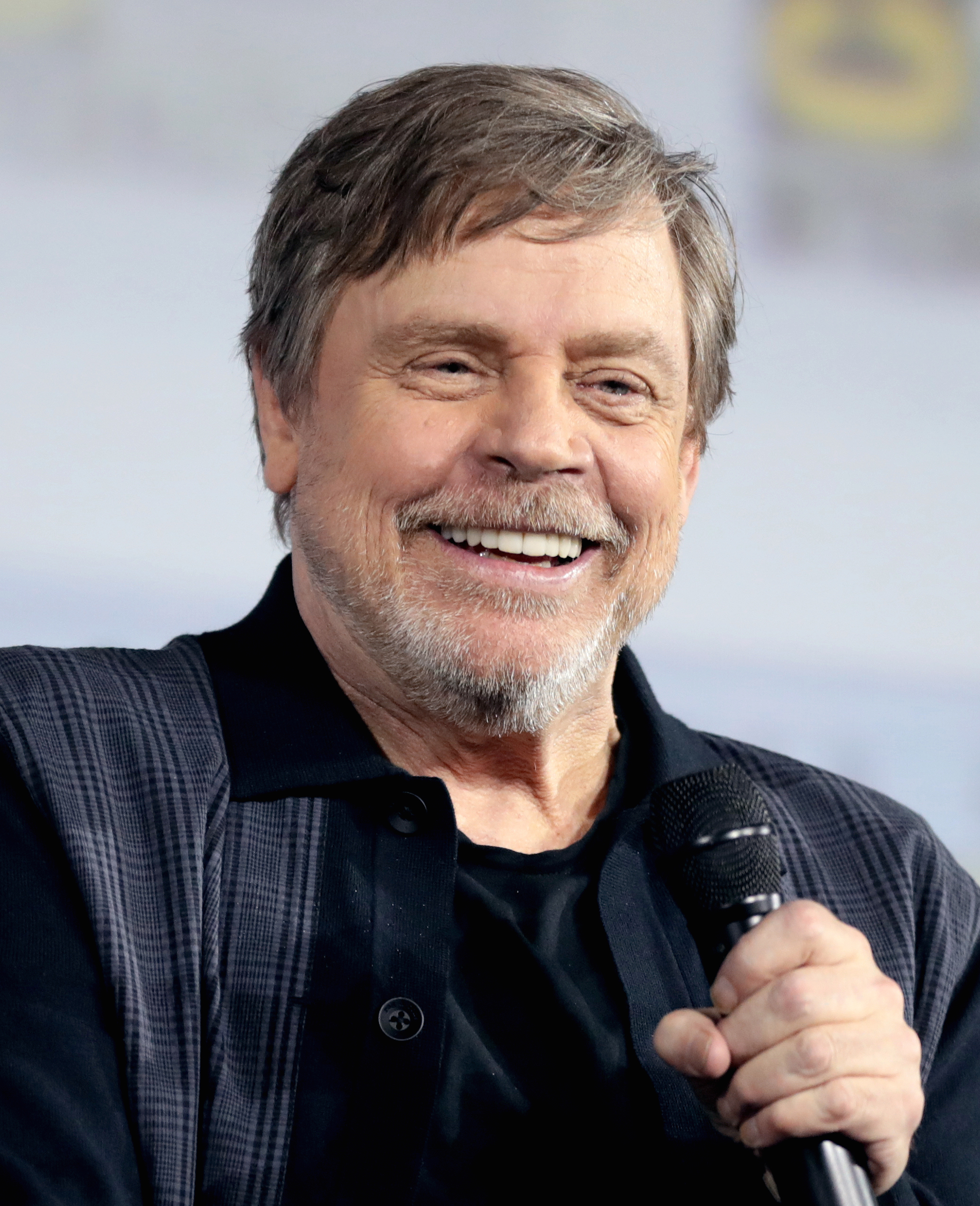
Mark Hamill

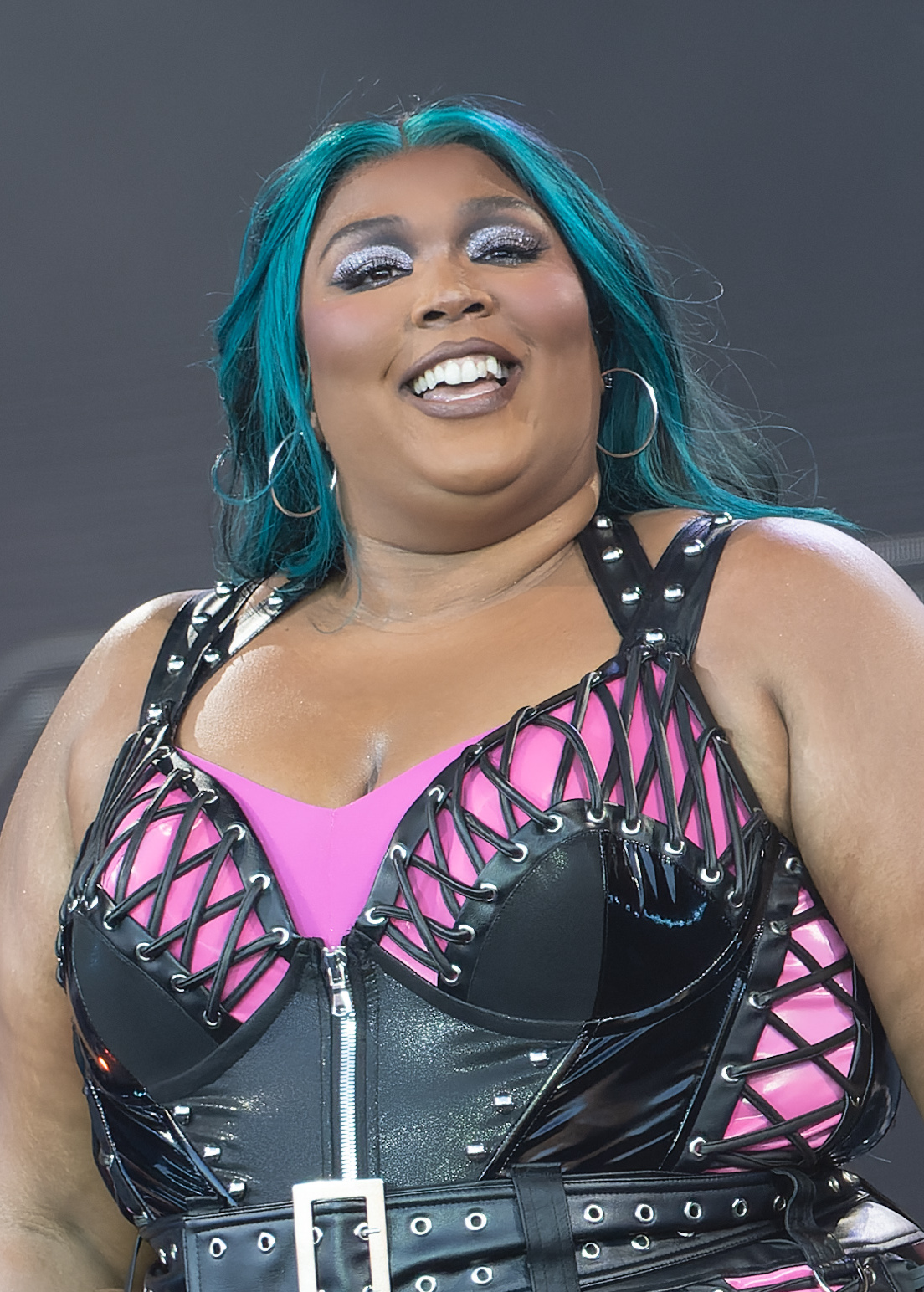
Lizzo

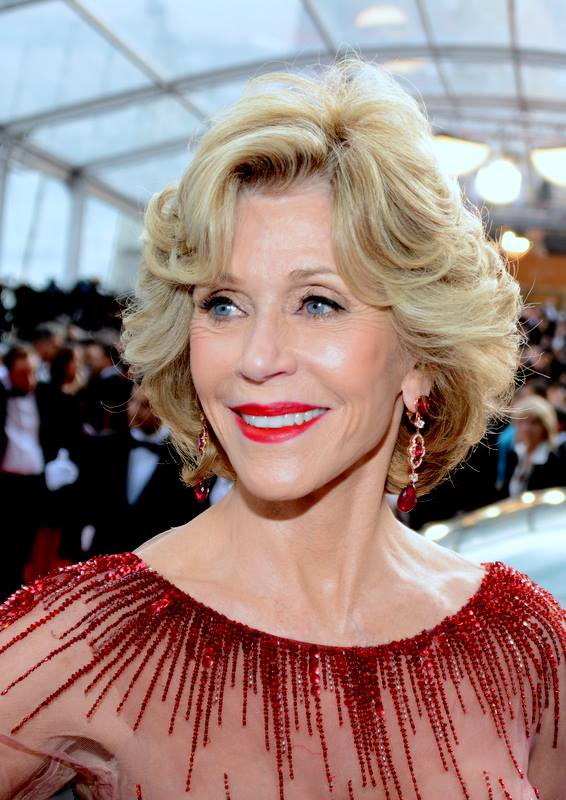
Jane Fonda

- J. J. Abrams, filmmaker
- Christina Aguilera, singer, songwriter, and actress
- John August, screenwriter, director, producer and novelist
- Jason Bateman, actor and filmmaker
- Dustin Lance Black, screenwriter, director and producer
- Jack Black, actor and musician
- Gary U.S. Bonds, singer
- Connie Britton, actress
- LaLa Brooks, singer
- LaTosha Brown, co-founder of Black Voters Matter
- Charisma Carpenter, actress
- Lynda Carter, actress, singer and beauty pageant titleholder
- Gene Chandler, singer
- Fernando Chavez, son of Cesar Chavez
- Paul Chavez, son of Cesar Chavez
- ~~George Clooney, actor and filmmaker~~ (called on Biden to withdraw)
- ~~Stephen Colbert, late-night talk show host~~ (called on Biden to withdraw)
- Misha Collins, actor
- Andrea Conte, First Lady of Tennessee (2003–2011); First Lady of Nashville (1991–1999)
- George Conway, activist and co-founder of the Lincoln Project (Independent)
- Robert De Niro, actor
- Jonathan Del Arco, actor
- Michael Douglas, actor
- Harry Dunn, former United States Capitol Police officer
- Cynthia Erivo, actress and singer
- Mary Fisher, activist
- Jane Fonda, actress and activist
- Melinda French Gates, philanthropist and former multimedia product developer and manager at Microsoft
- Jason Winston George, actor and singer
- Whoopi Goldberg, actress, comedian, and television personality
- Blake Cooper Griffin, actor
- Chad Griffin, activist
- Kathryn Hahn, actress
- Mark Hamill, actor
- Nia-Malika Henderson, journalist and political commentator
- Elaine Hendrix, actress
- Reginald Hudlin, film director and screenwriter
- Joanna Johnson, television producer
- Colin Jost, comedian
- ~~Ashley Judd, actress~~ (called on Biden to withdraw)
- Olivia Julianna, activist
- Kerry Kennedy, author, lawyer, and activist
- Max Kennedy, author and lawyer
- Rory Kennedy, filmmaker
- Steve Kerr, professional basketball coach
- Keegan-Michael Key, actor and comedian
- Jimmy Kimmel, late-night talk show host
- Carole King, singer and songwriter
- Lenny Kravitz, singer, songwriter, and multi-instrumentalist
- Queen Latifah, rapper, singer, and actress
- John Legend, singer, actor
- David Letterman, former talk show host
- Lizzo, rapper and singer
- Eva Longoria, actress
- Sarah Longwell, political commentator and founder and publisher of The Bulwark (Republican)
- Seth MacFarlane, actor, filmmaker, singer, and animator
- Sean Maguire, actor and singer
- David Mandel, television producer, director, and writer
- Peggy March, singer
- Ryan McCartan, actor and singer
- Idina Menzel, actress
- Adam Met, musician
- Lea Michele, actress and singer
- Stephanie Miller, political commentator
- Lin-Manuel Miranda, songwriter, librettist, and actor
- Ryan Murphy, television producer, director, and writer
- Max Mutchnick, television producer
- Michelle Obama, First Lady of the United States (2009–2017)
- Aaron Parnas, lawyer
- Ben Platt, actor and singer
- Sheryl Lee Ralph, actress and singer
- Martha Reeves, singer
- Cecile Richards, president of Planned Parenthood Federation of America (2006–2018)
- Julia Roberts, actress
- Emmy Rossum, actress
- Jeri Ryan, actress
- Jack Schlossberg, writer, grandson of John F. Kennedy
- Steve Schmidt, activist and co-founder of the Lincoln Project
- Adam Shankman, director, producer and writer
- Martin Sheen, actor
- Michael Smith, interior designer
- Yeardley Smith, actress
- Octavia Spencer, actress
- Steven Spielberg, filmmaker
- Stuart Stevens, activist and co-founder of the Lincoln Project (Independent)
- Sharon Stone, actress, painter and former model
- Barbra Streisand, singer, actress, and filmmaker
- George Takei, actor and activist
- James Taylor, singer, songwriter, and guitarist
- Lexi Underwood, actress
- ~~Cenk Uygur, co-creator of The Young Turks~~ (withdrew endorsement)
- Bradley Whitford, actor
- Anna Wintour, editor-in-chief of Vogue
- ~~Matthew Yglesias, blogger, journalist, and co-founder of Vox~~ (called on Biden to withdraw)

== See also ==
- List of Donald Trump 2024 presidential campaign endorsements
- List of Kamala Harris 2024 presidential campaign endorsements
- List of Joe Biden 2020 presidential campaign primary endorsements
- List of Joe Biden 2020 presidential campaign endorsements
- List of Democrats who opposed the Joe Biden 2024 presidential campaign
