= David Paul =

David Paul may refer to:

- David Blackwood Paul (1908–1965), New Zealand bookseller
- David Paul (actor) (1957–2020), American actor
- David Paul (soccer) (born 1987), American soccer player
- David Paul (minister) (1845–1929), Scottish minister, Moderator of the General Assembly of the Church of Scotland in 1915
- David Paul (politician), Marshallese politician and cabinet member
- David C. Paul (born 1966/1967), American billionaire, founder of Globus Medical
- David L. Paul (1939–2022), American banker, real estate developer, and founder of CenTrust Bank
- Dave Paul (born 1967 or 1968), American politician, member of the Washington House of Representatives
