= Virgil Miller Newton =

American priest (1938–2025)

Virgil Miller Newton III
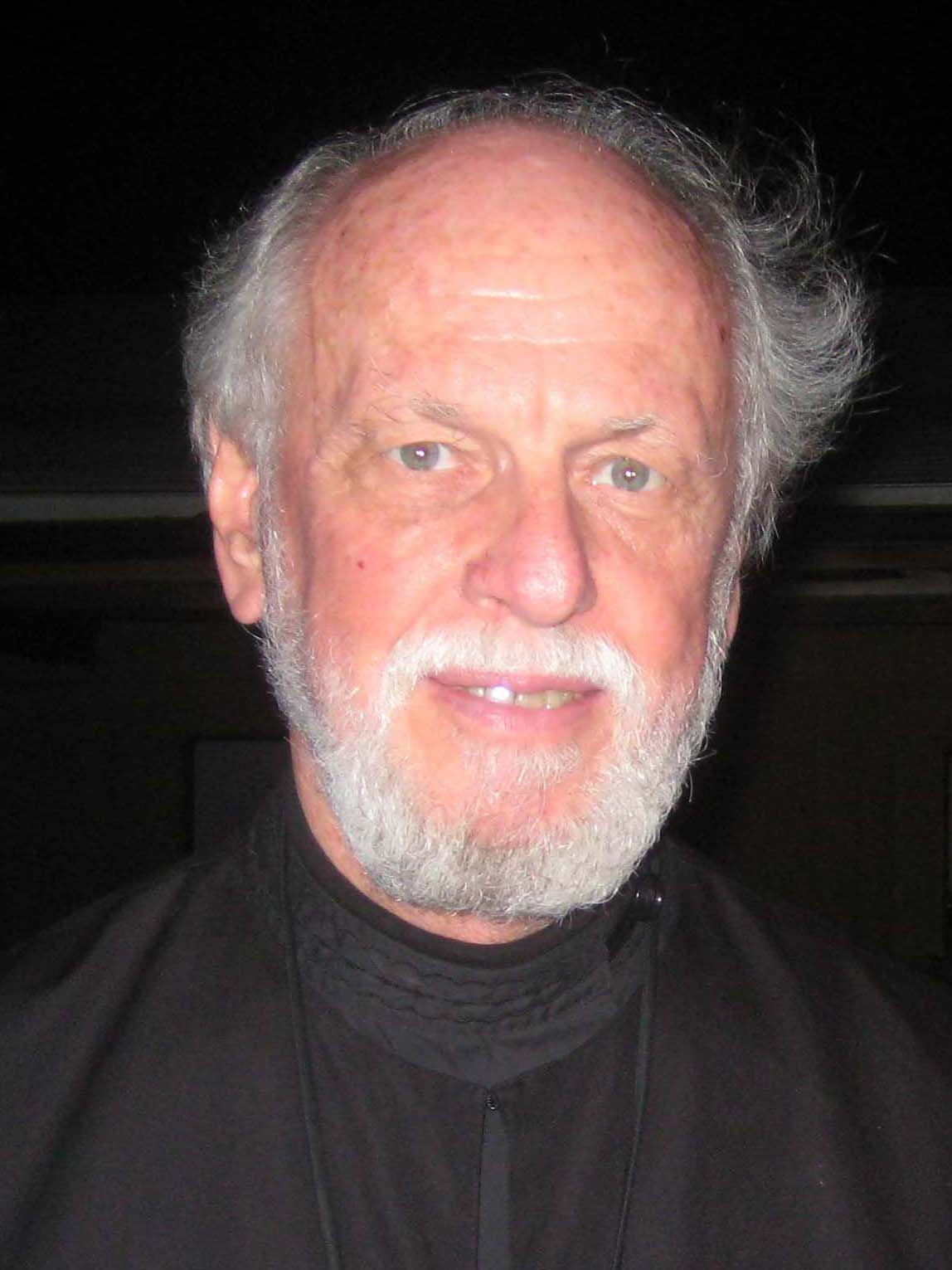
- Father Cassian in 2009
- Born: September 6, 1938; Tampa, Florida, U.S.
- Died: August 8, 2025 (aged 86); St. Petersburg, Florida, U.S.
- Other name: Father Cassian
- Education: BA, MDiv and PhD
- Alma mater: University of South Florida, Princeton University and Union Graduate School
- Spouse: Ruth Ann
- Children: Joanna, Miller and Mark
- Parent(s): Louisa and Virgil Miller Newton, Jr.

Virgil Miller Newton (September 6, 1938 – August 8, 2025) was an American priest and the Chairman and Director of Christ at the Sea Foundation in Madeira Beach, Florida; a priest in the Antiochian Orthodox Church (but is no longer listed on the AOC website); and the former Director of several rehabilitation centers for youth with drug problems, behavior problems, eating disorders and other compulsive behavior. His rehabilitative methods have been criticized.

Many former patients have sued for abuse.

Newton died on August 8, 2025, at the age of 86.

== Early life ==
Virgil Miller Newton III was born in Tampa Bay, Florida on September 6, 1938, the son of Louisa and Virgil Miller Newton Junior. His father was managing editor of the Tampa Tribune and well known for his fight against secrecy in the government, authoring papers such as “Federal Thought Control a Challenge to American Liberties and Freedom.” His mother taught Sunday School at their local church, Hyde Park Methodist.

During his sophomore year he felt "called to preach the word of God." The Florida Methodist Conference licensed him to preach during his senior year at Sewanee Military Academy. In the summer of 1956, before heading to college he filled in as a student supply pastor in This hometown of Tampa and St Petersburg, FL. From 1956–1957, Newton was appointed state Master Counselor for the Florida chapter of The Order of DeMolay.

In the fall of 1956, he began attending Princeton University. After taking a course in religion, Newton in 1957 was contracted to be the lay pastor for the Emlystown circuit in New Jersey, which consisted of 3 churches. Shortly after returning from a ministers conference at Ashbury College, his car lost control and crashed into an oncoming truck, killing a classmate. Newton who had been sleeping in the back seat at the time suffered minor injuries. He stayed in New Jersey over the 1957 summer break to continue his preaching circuit. Newton returned to Florida and recuperated for a year before resuming his studies at the University of Florida, where he obtained a degree in history. During this time, he married and had three children with wife Ruth Ann(née Klink): Joanna (born 1959), Miller (born 1960), and Mark (born 1964). He returned to Princeton University and earned his master's degree.

Moving to Indianapolis in late 1963, Newton became the Methodist head pastor of Fletcher Place and subsequently was appointed to the Inter City Association, an organization dedicated to urban poverty issues. During 1964-1965 Newton helped raise money for the black belt region, advocated for an end to token appointments that do not adequately represent the local African American community and protested against the lack of representation of African Americans on the Mayor's poverty board. Newton also created a storefront church he named "Outpost" in which he held informal meetings to encourage neighborhood political empowerment on urban poverty issues.

The University of South Florida in Tampa hired Newton as an associate professor of education where he had both teaching and administrative duties. In 1972 Newton took a leave of absence from the university to campaign for the Democratic nomination for the Florida 5th congressional seat; this was one of three newly created positions. Despite being a prior former president of the Florida Young Democrats he failed to gain the nomination. He was subsequently appointed by Florida Governor Reubin Askew as Pasco Circuit Court Clerk and Clerk to the County Commission. Newton modernized and reorganized the office and in 1974 was reelected to serve out the remaining 2 years of the position. During his term he dealt with several conflicts and in 1975 faced a stripping of power after the County Commission felt he had dabble in policy-making. Newton chose in 1976 not to stand for reelection for the clerk position, but instead tried a second time to win the Democratic nomination for the 5th District congressional seat. After a fierce campaign involving a lawsuit and ethics complaint filed against his opponent JoAnne Saunders, Newton lost the nomination a second time. In 1977, Newton went to work for Gary Smith and Associates and later that year, suffered the loss of his father.

In 1979, Newton was named the Executive Director of the Florida Alcohol Coalition. His youngest son Mark developed a drug problem and on September 26, was enrolled in Straight, Inc. a drug rehabilitation program. At the time, Newton was Executive Director of the Florida Association of Alcohol Treatment Programs. The experience with Mark profoundly affected Newton.

== Straight program (1980–1983) ==
Four months after enrolling his son, Newton joined Straight, Inc. St Petersburg as Assistant Director. The Straight program was founded in 1976 by wealthy real estate developers Mel Sembler and Joseph Zappala. The average stay was twenty months long, and its corporate goals were "to admit 14 clients per month". Most clients paid an average of $14,000 for the treatment.

In 1980 Newton attended a workshop on alcoholism at the Johnson Institute in Minneapolis. It was during this time he also switched his doctoral focus to teen drug abuse. He defended his doctoral thesis titled "The Organization and Implementation of Family Involvement in Adolescent Drug-Use Rehabilitation", and graduated in 1981 with a PhD in Public Administration and Urban Anthropology.

Newton had obtained directorship of the St Petersburg facility by 1981, and in July 1982, Mel Sembler promoted him to the position of National Director of Straight, Inc.

== KIDS (1984–2000) ==
KIDS of Bergen County (1984–1990)

The program had the capacity to treat over 175 youths at a time and the initial fee was $7,200 with an average stay in the program of 12–14 months. Newton also enrolled sibling groups to prevent brothers and sisters from following in the same destructive lifestyle.

A system of peer monitoring enforced his program’s rules. New youths or youths in the first stages of the program were forbidden to be alone, even to shower or use the bathroom. Newcomers were accompanied everywhere through hand-to-belt looping. Socializing was not allowed, and the youths were isolated from their family and friends. Twice a week, Newton held open meetings in which the families were seated on one side of the room and youths on the other. The purpose of these meeting was for the youths to publicly confess their difficulties, and advancement from the first stage depended upon how revealing their confessions were. The program's counselors were former graduates of the program.

In 1984, Newton co-authored Not My Kid: A Parents Guide to Kids and Drugs with TV producer Beth Polson. The book was endorsed by Barbara Walters and was the basis for the 1985 CBS made-for-TV movie Not My Kid, starring Stockard Channing and George Segal, which depicted many of the methods used in Newton's real-life treatment centers.

The program would come under legal scrutiny. In 1989 the Bergen County prosecutor's office cited complaints that been made against KIDS since 1985, including the use of restraints that resulted, according to a newspaper report, in "blackened eyes, bloody lips, a broken nose and a dislocated elbow." Additionally there were allegations of strip searches, restrictions of sleep and toilet facilities, crowded bedrooms, and lack of schooling. Similar allegations were made regarding Newton's programs in other parts of the country, though Newton denied them, maintaining that the accusations were promulgated by social workers and public officials who had been deceived by drug addicts. In a 1989 interview with ABC Television, Florida state prosecutor David Levin characterized it as "....a sort of private jail, utilizing techniques such as torture and punishment which even a convicted criminal would not be subject to." In response Newton said "I don't like the word imprison. Imprison implies punishment." Saying he disapproved of violence, Newton said he preferred calling it "an isolation ward."

=== KIDS of North Jersey (1990–1998) ===
In September 1993, he obtained a clinical psychology doctoral degree, again from Union Institute. His thesis, titled "Guiding Youth Through the Perilous Ordeal", was published in 1995.

In 1992 three of Newton's peer counselors were convicted of assault at KIDS of North Jersey. The presiding Secaucus Municipal Judge, Emil DelBaglivo, called KIDS a "highly questionable" program. He said something was "radically wrong" if the program director would condone "almost unbelievable" conduct. KIDS of North Jersey closed on November 2, 1998, and Virgil Miller and Ruth Ann Newton returned to Madeira Beach.

In 1998, the state Department of Human Services required Newton to change the program, threatening to cut off Medicaid payments if he did not. The state cited physical restraints and the use of patients as assistants as problems. On May 1, 1998, the state cut off payments. Newton's appeals led to hearings before an Administrative Law judge in late 1998. The judge supported the decision of the state.

KIDS of North Jersey closed on November 2, 1998. In 1999, the state alleged $1M in overbillings.

=== KIDS lawsuits ===
On February 24, 1987, 14-year-old Rebecca Ehrlich was enrolled in KIDS of Bergen County. She "was an obstinate, rebellious teen-ager" who had not tried drugs or alcohol. She said she endured physical and emotional abuse until her release in June 1993. Newton said that no one with a professional license had treated her and that such evaluation and subsequent treatment was carried out by "peer counselors." Malpractice insurance for Newton, his wife and corporation paid $4.5 million as a result.

Without a history of drug abuse, Lulu Corter was treated in KIDS of Bergen County for thirteen years. Corter later won a settlement of $6.5 million.

In 1996, the Federal Government lodged claims against Newton and KIDS for billing the Federal Employees Health Benefits Program for treatment by physicians when the physicians signing the forms had not provided services. Newton did not admit wrongdoing, but agreed to pay back $45,000 for 245 claims.
