= Joy Silverman =

American socialite

- Born: Joy Fererh; April 8, 1947 (age 79)
- Education: University of Maryland
- Spouse(s): Richard Simons (divorced); David L. Paul (divorced); Jeffrey Silverman (divorced)
- Children: Evan Marc Simons; Jessica Silverman
- Parent(s): Jeanette Rothenberg Fererh; Ben Fererh
- Family: Bruce Wolosoff (brother)

Joy Silverman (born April 8, 1947) is an American socialite and Republican Party operative and fundraiser.

== Early life and education ==
Silverman was born Joy Fererh on April 8, 1947, the daughter of Jeanette (née Rothenberg) and Ben Fererh. In 1951, her parents divorced and in 1955, she moved to Great Neck, New York with her mother's new husband, Marc Germont. She attended elementary school in Great Neck and also took Hebrew classes at Temple Israel. She has one half-brother from her mother's second marriage, composer Bruce Wolosoff. Germont died of leukemia when Silverman was 12 and her mother married wealthy Long Island real estate developer Alvin Bibbs Wolosoff for whom she worked as a secretary.

In 1964, she attended the Howard School for Girls in Bridgewater, Massachusetts and then studied liberal arts at the University of Maryland from 1965 to 1968 but dropped out.

== Career ==
After college, Silverman went to work as a receptionist at Metro-Goldwyn-Mayer in New York City. In 1986, she was named a member of New York City Mayor's Commission for Protocol under Ed Koch and also served chairman of the Advisory Council of the New York State Commission on the Bicentenial of the United States Constitution.

In 1988, she worked for the New York presidential campaign of then-Vice President George H. W. Bush raising over $600,000 becoming one of his top fundraisers. She donated $100,000 to Bush's campaign and additional $300,000 to his various Republican candidates either in her name, her husband's name, or in the name of Ply Gem Building Products where her husband was CEO. After Bush's victory, Bush's brother, Jonathan Bush and Republican Party Chairman Richard N. Bond recommended her for an ambassadorship and she was nominated on June 29, 1989 as United States Ambassador to Barbados (which is also responsible for Dominica, Saint Lucia, and Saint Vincent and the Grenadines) despite her desire to be named Ambassador to Luxembourg.

The nomination was controversial as she was one of several made by Bush of long-time financial backers and financial supporters rather than career Foreign Service officers including Republican bundler Peter F. Secchia (Ambassador to Italy), Walter Curley (Ambassador to France), real estate developer Joseph Zappala (Ambassador to Spain), and real estate developer Mel Sembler (Ambassador to Australia). Democratic Senator Paul Sarbanes shut down the nomination stating she is "a candidate with no ostensible qualifications for ambassadorship other than her campaign contributions" despite the rest of the non-career and all-male nominees being approved to more prestigious positions. The Wolosoff family attorney and in-law, Chief Judge of the New York Court of Appeals Sol Wachtler (Wachtler's wife was the niece of Alvin Bibbs Wolosoff) tried to intervene on her behalf with formal documentation of Silverman's campaign contributions. Nevertheless, the nomination eventually expired in the U.S. Senate never coming to a vote. President Bush then appointed her as a trustee of the John F. Kennedy Center for the Performing Arts. When Alvin Bibbs Wolosoff died in 1984, Wachtler served as executor of his $24 million estate and protected Silverman's $2.4 million inheritance from Wolosoff's son James who had been disinherited.

== Personal life ==
In 1988, Silverman and Wachtler began to have an affair but the relationship soured in 1991 as Wachtler refused to leave his wife; Silverman then began dating attorney David Samson. Wachtler did not take her leaving him well and soon began harassing Silverman. Silverman directly contacted then FBI Director William Sessions who referred the case to the FBI field office in Newark. After a call to Silverman was traced to Wachtler, he was arrested on 7 November 1992, on charges including extortion, racketeering, and blackmail. Prosecutors alleged that he demanded a $20,000 blackmail payment in exchange for turning over compromising photographs and tapes of Silverman with her then-boyfriend, attorney David Samson. He eventually pleaded guilty to harassing Silverman and threatening to kidnap her daughter. Wachtler resigned as a judge and from the bar; and was sentenced to 15 months, but received time off for good behavior. Silverman was besieged by the press and blamed for her role in the removal of the popular judge and left New York City. Silverman later became spokesperson for the National Victim Center.

== Family ==
In January 1969, she married her childhood friend and furniture store heir, Richard "Dick" Simons. The couple moved to Palm Beach, Florida and had one son, Evan Marc Simons (born 1970). In 1972, they divorced. She was introduced to her second husband, Florida banker David L. Paul, by real estate developer Sol Atlas; they divorced 2 months later. In 1977, she married recently divorced New York financier Jeffrey Silverman. Silverman adopted Evan and the couple also adopted a daughter, Jessica. In 1995, they divorced after Silverman's affair with Sol Wachtler. Jeffrey Silverman remarried but later committed suicide.
