= Walter Curley =

American diplomat

- Curley in 1973

57th United States Ambassador to France
- In office July 6, 1989 – February 11, 1993
- President: George H. W. Bush
- Preceded by: Joe M. Rodgers
- Succeeded by: Pamela Harriman

United States Ambassador to Ireland
- In office September 18, 1975 – May 2, 1977
- President: Gerald Ford
- Preceded by: John D. J. Moore
- Succeeded by: William V. Shannon

Personal details
- Born: September 17, 1922 Pittsburgh, Pennsylvania, U.S.
- Died: June 2, 2016 (aged 93) New York City, New York, U.S.
- Spouse: Mary Taylor Walton
- Children: 4
- Education: Yale University; Harvard University

Military service
- Allegiance: United States
- Branch/service: United States Marine Corps
- Rank: Captain
- Battles/wars: World War II

Walter Joseph Patrick Curley Jr. (September 17, 1922 – June 2, 2016) was the 57th United States Ambassador to France from 1989 to 1993, and the United States Ambassador to Ireland from 1975 to 1977. Curley was New York City's Commissioner of Public Events and Chief of Protocol from 1973 to 1974, during the administrations of John Lindsay and Abraham Beame.

== Career ==
He wrote two books on royalty, Vanishing Kingdoms, and Monarchs in Waiting, as well as two memoirs, Letters from the Pacific: 1943–1946, and Almost a Century: An American Life East and West of Suez. Curley was a graduate of Phillips Academy, Yale University and Harvard Business School. Curley was in the Marine Corps during World War II, serving from 1943 to 1946, seeing combat on Iwo Jima and Okinawa. He was a captain and was decorated with a Bronze star. Curley died in New York City.

His nomination as United States Ambassador to France was controversial as he was one of several made by Bush of long-time financial backers and financial supporters including Peter F. Secchia (Ambassador of Italy), Joseph Zappala (Ambassador of Spain), Mel Sembler (Ambassador of Australia), Frederic Bush Morris (Ambassador of Luxembourg), and Joy Silverman (Ambassador of Barbados).

== Works ==
- Curley, Walter J. P. (1959). Letters from the Pacific: 1943–1946. privately printed. ASIN B00NZK2AXM.
- Curley, Walter J. P. (1973). Monarchs-in-waiting. Dodd, Mead and Company. ISBN 978-0396068402.
- Curley, Walter J. P. (2004). Vanishing Kingdoms: The Irish Chiefs and Their Families. The Lilliput Press. ISBN 978-1843510550.
- Curley, Walter J. P. (2017). Almost a Century: An American Life East and West of Suez. Small Batch Books. ISBN 978-1937650674.

Diplomatic posts
Preceded by Joe M. Rodgers	U.S. Ambassador to France; 1989–1993	Succeeded by Pamela Harriman
Preceded by John D. J. Moore	U.S. Ambassador to Ireland; 1975–1977	Succeeded by William V. Shannon
