= Peter Secchia =

American businessman and diplomat (1937–2020)

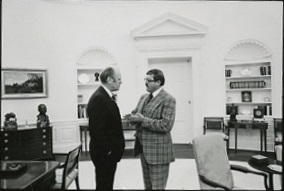

United States Ambassador to Italy
- In office July 3, 1989 – January 20, 1993
- President: George H. W. Bush
- Preceded by: Maxwell M. Rabb
- Succeeded by: Reginald Bartholomew

Personal details
- Born: April 15, 1937 Englewood, New Jersey, U.S.
- Died: October 21, 2020 (aged 83) East Grand Rapids, Michigan, U.S.
- Party: Republican
- Education: Michigan State University (BA)

Peter Finley Secchia (April 15, 1937 – October 21, 2020) was an American businessman and Republican political activist, who also served as the United States Ambassador to Italy and San Marino from 1989 to 1993.

== Education and early life ==
Secchia was born in Englewood, New Jersey. He grew up in nearby Tenafly and graduated from Tenafly High School and then went on to attend Michigan State University. He left the university because he could not afford tuition and joined the Marines. He eventually earned a degree in economics in 1963.

== Career ==
Secchia served in the United States Marine Corps from 1956 to 1959 and graduated from Michigan State University in 1963 with a degree in economics.

Secchia was a fund-raiser in the Republican Party in Michigan. He started as chairman of the Kent County, Michigan Republican Committee and later became the chairman of the 5th Congressional District of Michigan committee. He was elected to be Michigan's Republican National Committeeman in 1980, 1984, and 1988. Secchia was a vice chairman of the Republican National Committee and headed its Midwest Region. He was host chairman of the 1985 RNC Midwest Leadership Conference in Grand Rapids, Michigan. He was on the national advisory committee of the 1988 George Bush for President Committee. Secchia founded the Lake Michigan Conference, and was a national co-chair of the Dole for President Campaign.

From 1989 to 1993 Secchia was the United States' ambassador to Italy. His nomination was controversial as he was one of several made by Bush of long-time financial backers and financial supporters, including Walter Curley (ambassador to France), Joseph Zappala (Spain), Mel Sembler (Australia), Frederic Bush Morris (Luxembourg), and Joy Silverman (Barbados).

Secchia was the CEO and chairman of the board of Universal Forest Products, a company that manufactures engineered wood components. He was Chairman of the River City Food Company which has 29 restaurants, catering facilities, and banquet locations in the states of Michigan, Pennsylvania, and Maryland.

In 1994 he was appointed to chair the Secchia Commission I by Michigan governor John Engler, which was focused on improving government services. The Secchia Commission II focused on public sector pensions.

He received the Cavaliere di Gran Croce (The Knight of the Great Cross). He also was awarded the Department of State Distinguished Honor Award during his service as ambassador to Italy, an award given to serving ambassadors and to non-career ambassadors.

Secchia served for twelve years on the board for John Cabot University in Rome. Secchia was a member of the National Italian American Foundation Council of 1000. He was founding president of the West Michigan Lodge of the Order of Sons of Italy in America; he inaugurated the Festa Italiana, the region's largest annual ethnic festival and has participated in and sponsored many Italian-American events. He was awarded the NIAF Special Achievement Award for International Affairs, and lent his name to The Founding Values Initiative Award... the "Secchia Award for Heartfelt Commitment."

== Philanthropy ==
In 2010, Secchia made a $1 million outright donation to Michigan State University, to be used to build a new stadium for the women's softball team at Old College Field, named Secchia Stadium.

Secchia Hall, a building on the MSU College of Human Medicine Grand Rapids campus, is named after Secchia. The building is part of the Grand Rapids Medical Mile.

Secchia Hall, a residence hall on the Grand Valley State University's Pew Campus, is also named after Secchia.

== Death ==
Secchia died on October 21, 2020, after contracting COVID-19 during the COVID-19 pandemic in Michigan, on top of other health issues over several months.

Diplomatic posts
Preceded by Maxwell M. Rabb	United States Ambassador to Italy; 1989–1993	Succeeded by Reginald Bartholomew
