= Joe M. Rodgers =

American construction company executive and political operative

United States Ambassador to France
- In office September 20, 1985 – January 8, 1989
- President: Ronald Reagan
- Preceded by: Evan Griffith Galbraith
- Succeeded by: Walter Curley

Personal details
- Born: November 12, 1933 Bay Minette, Alabama, U.S.
- Died: February 2, 2009 (aged 75) Nashville, Tennessee, U.S.
- Spouse: Helen Martin "Honey" Rodgers
- Children: 2
- Education: University of Alabama
- Profession: Diplomat

Joe M. Rodgers (November 12, 1933 – February 2, 2009) was an American construction company executive and political operative who served as the United States Ambassador to France.

== Early life ==
Rodgers was born on November 12, 1933, in Bay Minette, Alabama. He was raised in Montgomery, Alabama, where he graduated from Sidney Lanier High School. He attended the University of Alabama, where he was awarded a bachelor's degree in civil engineering in 1956. He served in the United States Coast and Geodetic Survey Corps from 1956 to 1958, where he became a lieutenant.

== Business career ==
Rodgers had worked as sales manager for Dixie Concrete Pipe and went out on his own, starting a construction firm in 1966. Having been given a ticket and a house share for the 1968 Masters Tournament at the Augusta National Golf Club, Rodgers ended up sharing a home with Thomas Frist, a doctor from Nashville, Tennessee, who had just started a private hospital company called Hospital Corporation of America. The two built a connection while walking the golf course and Frist offered Rodgers a contract to build a hospital in Erin, Tennessee, for HCA. By 1970, Rodgers had built 19 hospitals for Hospital Corporation of America and had built 200 for the company by 1979, generating $120 million in revenue that year.

His firm took on a project in April 1972 to complete the building of the National Life and Accident Insurance Company's Opryland USA complex which had been scheduled to open on May 19, but had been delayed due to a strike by workers at another construction firm. Rodgers and his subcontractors crossed the picket lines and were able to earn a bonus for completing the project two days early, which was accomplished by working on shifts around the clock. The $50,000 bonus was turned over to local Boy and Girl Scout groups.

Rodgers sold a majority stake in his construction company after a 1977 heart attack and shifted into real estate development. Projects he developed included Vanderbilt Plaza and the Third National Bank building (which has since been renamed the Fifth Third Center), both in downtown Nashville. He started American Constructors in 1979, which built Nashville's Country Music Hall of Fame and Museum, the Schermerhorn Symphony Center and the Wildhorse Saloon.

In 1987, Rodgers was described by The New York Times as "a leading candidate to head the Department of Commerce" to succeed Malcolm Baldrige Jr., a post that ultimately went to William Verity Jr.

Rodgers was named to serve as chairman and acting CEO of Berlitz International, following the mysterious death of former part-owner Robert Maxwell in 1991. He also served as a director of several major corporations and was active in a number of local civic, charitable and religious organizations.

== Politics ==
During the 1976 Republican presidential primaries, Rodgers was an early supporter of Ronald Reagan's unsuccessful effort against President Gerald Ford and was finance chairman for Reagan's Tennessee primary campaign. He served as the Republican National Committee's finance chairman from 1978 to 1980, raising $75 million during his tenure. After Reagan was elected President in 1980, he named Rodgers to serve on the President's Foreign Intelligence Advisory Board. In 1984, building on his continued efforts raising funds for Republican candidates, he was the finance chief for Reagan's 1984 re-election campaign.

Rogers was fundraising co-chair for Fred Thompson's 2008 presidential campaign bid.

== Ambassador to France ==
In recognition of his efforts, Reagan named him in 1985 to a four-year term as the United States Ambassador to France. Rodgers had never been a diplomat and spoke no French, and spent six hours a day for a four-month period studying the language. Rodgers undertook a fundraising campaign to collect $500,000 to be used towards fixing up the ambassador's residence, raising $100,000 towards this goal by September 1985 after writing to 250 U.S. companies for donations. He and his wife resided in the official residence in Paris, where they would serve GooGoo Clusters, a hometown Nashville delicacy, to their diplomatic guests.

Rodgers accompanied President of France François Mitterrand on a Seine riverboat ride to the Île aux Cygnes where they unveiled a renovated replica of the Statue of Liberty, as part of ceremonies marking the centennial of the French gift to the United States. Rodgers represented the United States at ceremonies on June 6, 1986, to mark the 42nd anniversary of the Normandy Landings.

Mitterrand recognized Rodgers with the rank of Grand Officier of the Legion of Honor.

== Personal life and death ==
Rogers resided in Nashville, Tennessee.

Rodgers died of cancer on February 2, 2009, in Nashville, at age 75. He was survived by his wife, Helen Martin "Honey" Rodgers, to whom he had been married for 52 years, as well as a daughter, a son and eight grandchildren.

Diplomatic posts
Preceded by Evan Griffith Galbraith	U.S. Ambassador to France; 1985–1989	Succeeded by Walter Curley
