= Joseph Zappala =

American businessman and diplomat (born 1933)

59th United States Ambassador to Spain
- In office October 10, 1989 – June 4, 1992
- President: George H. W. Bush
- Preceded by: Reginald Bartholomew
- Succeeded by: Richard Goodwin Capen, Jr.

Personal details
- Born: September 11, 1933 (age 93) New York, U.S.
- Education: New York Institute of Finance

Joseph Zappala (born September 11, 1933) is an American businessman, investor and politician. He served as the Ambassador to Spain from 1989 to 1992.

== Early life and education ==
Zappala was born in New York on September 11, 1933. He grew up in Florida, and is a graduate from the New York Institute of Finance.

== Career ==
Zappala founded Joseph Zappala Associates. The company has been an operator and investor in different areas including banking interests, real estate and industrial companies in the United States.

== Ambassador to Spain ==
On October 3, 1989 Zappala was approved by the Senate. He was official appointed as Ambassador Extraordinary and Plenipotentiary of the United States of America to Spain on October 16. He presented his credentials on October 16, 1989 and left his post on June 4, 1992. His nomination was controversial as he was one of several made by Bush of long-time financial backers and financial supporters including Peter F. Secchia (Ambassador of Italy), Walter Curley (Ambassador of France), Mel Sembler (Ambassador of Australia), Frederic Bush Morris (Ambassador of Luxembourg), and Joy Silverman (Ambassador of Barbados).

Zappala later served as Director of GeoPharma Inc., where he stepped down on December 3, 2004.

== Awards ==
In 1992, he was awarded The Order of Isabella the Catholic Gran Cruz, the highest award ever awarded to a US diplomat by the Kingdom of Spain.

== Further affiliations ==
Zappala was on the board of directors of Straight, Incorporated, a non-profit drug rehabilitation program for teenagers and young adults, which he co-founded in 1976. The program later received harsh criticism for their employment of harmful "behavior modification" techniques like 12-hour confrontational group therapy, beatings and isolation.

Zappala served on George Bush’s Presidential campaign and was the National Co-Chairman of Finance for the American Bicentennial Presidential Inaugural. He was a donor to the Republican Party in the 1980s and donated $100,000 to the Bush campaign. He also raised $25 million during his time as Co-Chairman. His donations led to negative press, following his appointment as Ambassador to Spain.

In 2008 Zappala was part of a group of 100 former U.S. ambassadors who endorsed John McCain for president.

Zappala serves as Chairman of the Friars Foundation and is a council member and guest speaker at The Wilson Center, the US's key non-partisan policy forum.

== Personal life ==
Zappala lives in Florida, USA.

Diplomatic posts
Preceded by Reginald Bartholomew	United States Ambassador to Spain; 1989–1992	Succeeded by Richard Goodwin Capen Jr.
