= Globus Medical =

American medical device company

Globus Medical, Inc.
- Type: Public
- Traded as: NYSE: GMED (Class A); S&P 400 Component
- Industry: Medical Technology
- Founded: 2003
- Founders: David C. Paul
- Headquarters: Audubon, Pennsylvania, US
- Key people: David C. Paul (Chairman); Keith Pfeil (CEO)
- Products: Medical Devices
- Revenue: ▲US$712 million (2018)
- Operating income: ▲US$384 million (2018)
- Net income: ▲US$156 million (2018)
- Number of employees: 1,800 (2018)
- Website: www.globusmedical.com

Globus Medical, Inc. is a publicly traded orthopedic medical device company headquartered in Audubon, Pennsylvania, United States. Globus is focused on the design, development, and commercialization of products that enable surgeons to promote healing in patients with musculoskeletal disorders.

== Products ==
Globus develops, manufactures, and markets orthopedic implants including spine, trauma, and artificial joints.

Globus Medical makes the ExcelsiusGPS surgical robotic system for spine surgery. The robot is used for transpedicular drilling and screw placement. In November 2024, the company launched its ExcesiusHub, an advanced surgical navigation system for robotic surgical procedures.

The ADIRA XLIF Plate System aids in enhancing lateral spine surgery procedures.

== Acquisitions ==
In January 2014, Globus Medical acquired Excelsius Surgical. The Excelsius system is designed to integrate intra-operative digital imaging with a robotic surgery device to hold patients in place during surgeries "with sub-millimeter accuracy". In October of that year, the company acquired allograft tissue processor Transplant Technologies of Texas, Ltd. (TTOT). TTOT provides human tissue products, including bone allografts, biomaterials, and soft tissue products for spine, orthopedics, sports medicine, dental, and wound care markets.

In February 2015, Globus Medical acquired Branch Medical Group, a third-party manufacturer of high-precision medical devices.

In July 2016, Globus Medical acquired Alphatec Holdings, an international operations and distribution channel, for $80 million. As part of the transaction, Globus has agreed to provide Alphatec a five-year senior secured credit facility of up to $30 million.

In September 2018, Globus Medical acquired Nemaris, developers of Surgimap, a pre-operative planning software for spinal surgeons.

In August 2019, Globus Medical acquired privately owned StelKast, manufacturer of implants and instruments for hip and knee replacement.

In February 2023, Globus Medical acquired NuVasive in an all-stock deal valued at $3.1 billion.

== Controversies ==
In August 2007 Globus Medical settled a lawsuit initially filed by Synthes in 2004 over alleged stolen trade secrets. Former Synthes employees, who then worked for Globus, were accused of stealing 2300 electronic files containing blueprints for Synthes' products, safety-testing plans, and verbatim 510(k) filing documents. Globus paid Synthes $13.5 million and did not admit any wrongdoing.

In 2011, Synthes filed a second lawsuit against Globus Medical for infringing three patents, "asking the court to force the defendant to destroy its allegedly infringing products." Orthopedic Design & Technology Magazine reports that, "There was no finding of willful infringement in this lawsuit." A $16 million monetary damage was paid by Globus Medical in 2013.
