= Reginald Bartholomew =

American diplomat (1936–2012)

The Honorable Reginald Bartholomew
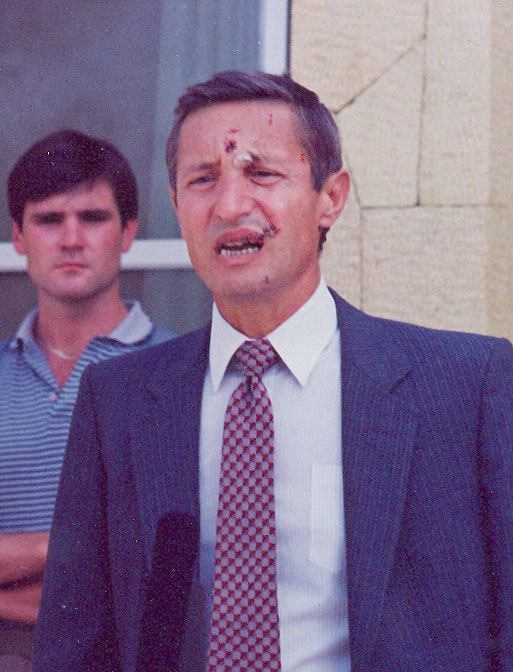
- Bartholomew, wounded, speaks in Beirut in 1984

9th Under Secretary of State for International Security Affairs
- In office April 20, 1989 – July 7, 1992
- President: George H. W. Bush
- Preceded by: Ed Derwinski
- Succeeded by: Frank G. Wisner

5th Director of the Bureau of Political-Military Affairs
- In office July 1, 1979 – January 20, 1981
- President: Jimmy Carter
- Preceded by: Leslie H. Gelb
- Succeeded by: Richard R. Burt

16th United States Ambassador to the North Atlantic Treaty Organization
- In office June 15, 1992 – March 25, 1993
- President: George H. W. Bush
- Preceded by: William Howard Taft IV
- Succeeded by: Robert E. Hunter

United States Ambassador to Lebanon
- In office 1983–1986
- President: Ronald Reagan
- Preceded by: Robert S. Dillon
- Succeeded by: John Hubert Kelly

58th United States Ambassador to Spain
- In office September 17, 1986 – March 12, 1989
- President: Ronald Reagan
- Preceded by: Thomas Ostrom Enders
- Succeeded by: Joseph Zappala

Personal details
- Born: Reginald Bartholomew; February 17, 1936 Portland, Maine, U.S.
- Died: August 26, 2012 (aged 76) New York City, New York, U.S.
- Spouse: Rose-Anne (née Dognin)
- Education: Dartmouth College, University of Chicago
- Occupation: United States Ambassador

Reginald Bartholomew (February 17, 1936 – August 26, 2012) was an American diplomat who served as U.S. Ambassador to Lebanon (1983–1986), Spain (1986–1989), and Italy (1993–1997). He was also a member of the American Academy of Diplomacy and Council on Foreign Relations. Additionally, he was also a member of the United States National Security Council staff (1977–1979).

== Education and early career ==
Bartholomew earned a bachelor's degree in history and political science from Dartmouth College in 1958 and a master's degree in political science from the University of Chicago. He later returned to the University of Chicago to teach social sciences and government. Bartholomew taught at Wesleyan University as well, from 1964 to 1968. While there, he met and befriended current President Emeritus of the Council on Foreign Relations, Leslie H. Gelb, then a fellow instructor. In 1967, Gelb left to work as a policy adviser at the Pentagon, persuading Bartholomew to join him the following year. Both occupied various departments in different roles, with Bartholomew working at the National Security Council during the Carter administration and later succeeding Gelb as the director of politico-military affairs at the State Department.

== Diplomatic career ==
Prior to his first ambassadorship, Bartholomew spent 15 years advising presidents and secretaries of state, most notably playing a key role in the SALT II arms limitation talks with the Soviet Union in 1979.

In 1983, Bartholomew was appointed ambassador to Lebanon. In the following years, terrorists bombed the newly constructed United States Embassy, as well as a Marine barracks. The escalating violence pressured the United States to pull its troops from the region. Under Bartholomew's advisement however, President Reagan delayed ordering the withdrawal until February 1984.

Bartholomew was appointed ambassador to Spain in 1986, where he led negotiations to preserve a greatly reduced military presence. He had worked on similar negotiations before and would again later, in Italy, where he served as ambassador from 1993 to 1997.

Upon retirement, he joined Merrill Lynch Investment Banking as Vice-chairman Europe and Chairman Italy (1997–2011).

Bartholomew died from cancer in New York City, on August 26, 2012, at the age of 76. His survivors include his wife of 56 years, Rose-Anne (née Dognin), four children, a brother, and seven grandchildren.

Government offices
Preceded by Leslie H. Gelb	Director of the Bureau of Politico-Military Affairs; July 1, 1979 – January 20, 1981	Succeeded by Richard Burt
Diplomatic posts
Preceded by Robert Sherwood Dillon	United States Ambassador to Lebanon; 1983–1986	Succeeded by John Hubert Kelly
Preceded by Thomas Ostrom Enders	United States Ambassador to Spain; 1986–1989	Succeeded by Joseph Zappala
Preceded by Peter F. Secchia	United States Ambassador to Italy; 1993–1997	Succeeded by Thomas M. Foglietta
