= Not My Kid =

- Genre: Drama
- Screenplay by: Christopher Knopf
- Story by: Beth Polson; Christopher Knopf
- Directed by: Michael Tuchner
- Starring: George Segal; Stockard Channing; Andrew Robinson; Gary Bayer; Nancy Cartwright; Christa Denton; Tate Donovan; Laura Harrington; John Philbin; Kathleen Wilhoite; Kathleen York; Viveka Davis
- Theme music composer: Mark Snow
- Country of origin: United States
- Original language: English

Production
- Executive producer: Beth Polson
- Producer: Pat Finnegan
- Cinematography: Fred J. Koenekamp
- Editor: Byron 'Buzz' Brandt
- Running time: 100 minutes
- Production company: Finnegan Productions

Original release
- Network: CBS
- Release: January 15, 1985

Not My Kid is a 1985 American made-for-television drama film directed by Michael Tuchner, which was based on a 1984 book of the same name by Beth Polson (who also served as the film's executive producer) and Miller Newton. The movie aired on CBS in the United States, and had a VHS release both there and in the United Kingdom, with ITC handling distribution rights.

== Plot ==
A teenaged drug addict is sent to Dr. Royce's controversial drug intervention program where the teenage addicts in the program confront each other in supervised group meetings. Also, in these meetings, the addicts are confronted by their families. The girl's mother wants to remove her from the program because it upsets her that their daughter is being forced to associate with addicts who admit to stealing and trading sex to support their drug habits. They remain in denial until their daughter admits at a family confrontation meeting the full extent of her drug addiction. After this, they are able to address their own feelings about being the family of a hardcore drug addict. The daughter is reunited with her family only after all of them have acknowledged her addiction and accepted therapy for it.

== Cast ==
- George Segal as Dr. Frank Bower
- Stockard Channing as Helen Bower
- Andrew Robinson as Doctor Royce
- Gary Bayer as Dr. Gramley
- Nancy Cartwright as Jean
- Christa Denton as Kelly Bower
- Tate Donovan as Ricky
- Laura Harrington as Melody
- John Philbin as Brian
- Kathleen Wilhoite as Penny
- Kathleen York as Linda
- Viveka Davis as Susan Bower
- Shawnee Smith as Carol
