= Drug Free America Foundation =

Drug policy organization

Drug Free America Foundation, Inc.
- Formation: April 22, 1976
- Founder: Mel Sembler, Betty Sembler
- Type: 501(c)(3)
- Tax ID no.: 59-1662427
- Registration no.: 735636
- Location: 5999 Central Avenue, Saint Petersburg, FL, 33710, USA
- Executive Director: Amy Ronshausen
- Website: Official website
- Formerly called: Straight, Inc. (1976–1985); The Straight Foundation, Inc. (1985–1995)

The Drug Free America Foundation (DFAF) is a 501(c)(3) nonprofit organization founded in 1976 by former US Ambassador Mel Sembler, his wife Betty Sembler (née Schlesinger), and Joseph Zappala as Straight, Inc., renamed The Straight Foundation, Inc. in 1985 and Drug Free America Foundation in 1995.

Originally a drug rehabilitation program for adolescents, it faced multiple lawsuits for abuse of its patients.

The organization no longer operates rehabilitation programs, and now "develops and promotes policies" opposing illegal drug use, drug addiction, and the decriminalization of cannabis and other drugs. It is a non-governmental organization (NGO) in Special Consultative Status with the United Nations Economic and Social Council.

== History ==
=== Origins ===
In 1976, Mel Sembler, Betty Sembler, and Joseph Zappala established the foundation as Straight, Inc. in St. Petersburg, Florida, with James E. Hartz, a clinical psychologist, as its first director. The organizers hoped to replace The Seed, a controversial drug rehabilitation program for adolescents in Florida, which had closed the previous year, but said that the two organizations were unaffiliated. Straight's program held its adolescent clients, ages 13 through 20, incommunicado in warehouses. The program operated through 43 centers across the United States, with locations in California, Connecticut, Delaware, Florida, Georgia, Kentucky, Massachusetts, Maryland, Michigan, New Hampshire, New York, Ohio, Pennsylvania, Rhode Island, South Carolina, Texas, Virginia, and Washington. Approximately 10,000 children had "graduated from the organization" by 1989, and over 50,000 had by 1992.

When announcing its establishment, organizers said it would enroll youth between the ages of 12 to 18 who had a history of drug abuses or offenses, ranging from youth whose parents had noted "minor drug trouble" to those referred by courts, but would not treat "addicts or those with a physical dependence on narcotics." However, Straight's practice was to enroll children without any history of drug or alcohol use, in addition to convicted felons, drug-users and addicts in need of medical intervention.

Straight's rehabilitation program operated until 1993. In every state in which Straight had a facility, state investigators documented abuse or patients alleged abuse in civil suits. Former clients won multiple lawsuits, and settled more out of court, for abusive practices, isolation, starvation, intentional infliction of emotional distress, false imprisonment, and other deprivations and torturous methods.

In 1981, Virgil Miller Newton, the father of a former Straight patient, became the director of Straight's facility in St. Petersburg. Clients knew him as "Dr. Newton," as he had just received his doctorate in Public Administration and Urban Anthropology. That year, Robert DuPont, the founding director of the National Institute on Drug Abuse visited Straight to encourage the organization to expand by creating new facilities nationwide and by training children "peer counselors" in Straight's methodology. However, none of the children had professional training and few had much more than an elementary or middle school education.

In 1982, Mel Sembler appointed Newton as Straight's national clinical director.

First Lady Nancy Reagan visited a Straight facility in Florida in 1982. Prior to the visit, she said she did not specifically endorse the program, but an aide told news media that Reagan was impressed with Straight because it was one of the few drug programs that enrolled adolescents, did not receive government funding (despite later evidence of insurance fraud and government grants), and it was "drug-free." In 1985, Reagan and Princess Diana visited Straight's facility in Springfield, Virginia. The two women attended a group "rap session", where Straight clients described their drug use and its sometimes-violent consequences.

=== State licensing ===
Over the course of its existence, Straight was in conflict with state licensing officials in Virginia, Maryland, and Florida on a number of occasions. As early as January 1978, Florida state officials reported concerns with the program that led it to consider withdrawing its operating license.

Virginia's Department of Mental Health, Mental Retardation and Substance Abuse Services cited Straight's Springfield, Virginia, center for violating state regulations repeatedly from the time the facility opened in 1982 to its closing in 1991. Virginia officials argued that state laws required that adolescents in Straight's programs be in school, while Straight believed that its clients should not be attending school until they had made progress in their treatment for substance abuse. In addition, Virginia regulators found that Straight's staff had held young clients against their will, allowed clients to restrain other clients and deprived clients of sleep, food, and water as a punishment. After an overwhelming number of nationwide lawsuits, Straight responded by denying certain allegations and changing some of its practices. In 1984, Florida officials had found that 13 Straight clients were held in the program against their will and that another 15 had been coerced into enrolling. Straight took the matter to the Florida courts, which ruled that parents could force their minor children into drug rehab. In 1991, Straight decided to move its program from Springfield, Virginia, to Columbia, Maryland, as a result of what it considered harassment by regulators.

Following the closure of Straight's Virginia facility, Maryland officials granted Straight a probationary license to operate a treatment center in Columbia, but only after Straight agreed to modify its practices, by providing educational programs to school-age students either on site or at Howard County, Maryland, public schools and by letting parents determine where their children would spend the night while in the early stages of the program. Previously, Straight staff members assigned students to stay with families of Straight clients who were further along in the program. Maryland officials found "no truth" to "allegations of child abuse, the use of physical restraints, [or] brainwashing" leveled against Straight. Maryland regulators continued to express concerns with Straight's practices until February 1992 when Straight closed the facility amidst declining enrollment and financial problems.

In 1993, Florida state investigators audited the state's licensing of Straight's St. Petersburg treatment center and found that officials at the Florida Department of Health and Rehabilitative Services had expressed concerns about Straight's practices, but that the agency granted Straight a license to operate despite those concerns. Regulators were concerned that Straight staff members denied medication to clients and used excessive force to restrain clients. According to the state audit, Straight co-founder Melvin Sembler, a prominent fundraiser for Republican politicians, and several Florida State Senators contacted the Department of Health and Rehabilitative Services in support of Straight. The audit concluded that "it cannot be unequivocally corroborated that this outside influence actually altered the decision to issue the license [to Straight]," but that "it appears that some members of HRS experienced some degree of pressure to grant Straight a license."

Straight opened a program in Yorba Linda, California in 1989, but, a year later, the state's Department of Social Services shut down the program after denying it a license to operate as a foster-family agency. State officials cited a record of "unusual punishments" at Straight, such as denying teenagers sleep and bathroom breaks. The state also complained about intimidation and ridicule of clients. About 40 Straight clients and parents protested the decision by picketing a local state licensing office, carrying placards with messages such as "Straight Saves Kids' Lives."

=== Lawsuits ===
In May 1983, Straight was ordered to pay $40,000 in compensatory and $180,000 in punitive damages after being sued by 20-year-old Fred Collins Jr., who had been held captive by the program against his will.

In October 1986, Straight settled a lawsuit with Susan White Milam for malpractice and negligence, statutory and licensing violations, false imprisonment, assault and battery, intentional infliction of emotional distress, and fraud. The lawsuit provided evidence of starvation; Straight staff placed the child on a peanut butter-and-water-only diet for months, with some days receiving no food, for refusal to admit to a drug problem she didn't have.

In 1990, a jury awarded Karen Norton, a Florida resident, $721,000 in damages due to mistreatment by Straight. In 1982, while a patient in Straight's Florida facility, Norton alleged that staff members assaulted her, denied her health care and refused to give her permission to visit her dying grandfather. At the time, the St. Petersburg Times described the verdict as the largest award ever against Straight.

In all, over $15 million in lawsuits were settled against Straight.

=== Treatment methods ===
Straight's philosophy emphasized the role of peer pressure in a young person's decision to use drugs and as a means for encouraging drug users to become "straight". The organization believed that effective treatment required isolating drug users from all of the factors that might explicitly or implicitly encourage drug use, including relationships with family and friends as well as elements of popular culture such as music and clothing. During this period of isolation, Straight clients would receive constant reinforcement from peers about the negative effects of drug use and the necessity of becoming clean. As young people progressed through the Straight program, they would be allowed to gradually assume new responsibilities, for instance by serving as counselors for other young people, and to return to school. In 1986, the St. Petersburg Times followed a 15-year-old boy through his treatment at Straight's Tampa Bay facility. The Times described Straight's treatment program as follows:

The methods, at least initially: No living at home. No talking to parents. No contact with anyone outside the program. No drugs. No cigarettes. No TV. No music. No reading. No school. And a daily onslaught of counseling sessions that often reduces a person to tears. Eventually, the person is allowed to read, move back home, and return to school. But such things can take a year or more, all depending upon how well each person behaves as they progress through the program.

At the core of the Straight experience were "rap sessions", or discussions led by a Straight staff member on topics such as the rules of the program, clients' experiences with drug use (even if the child had no prior experience with drugs), their current feelings about their drug use and their personal and family problems. In order to be called on to speak at a rap session, a teenager would be required to practice "Motivating", a Straight tradition which the Times described as "waving your hand in the air... so hard that your arm aches and you begin to perspire." The entire group would say "love you" when a person finished speaking and would regularly sing songs together. A typical day at a Straight facility consisted of a series of rap sessions from 9am to 9pm, with children arriving at the facilities from host homes as early as 6 a.m. and held together in small, guarded rooms until 9 a.m. On Mondays and Fridays, patients might finish their last rap session at midnight or later.

Straight first used a seven-step program, then in later years a twelve-step program modeled after Alcoholics Anonymous.

However, the Straight program was also divided into five stages.

A client began the program in the first stage, known as "humbling", and would gradually advance to subsequent stages as staff members determined that his or her treatment was progressing. In the first phase of the program, patients were not allowed to talk to their parents and were led everywhere by their belt loops, a means of demonstrating to patients that they had lost control of their lives. Patients stayed overnight at the homes of other young people who were further along in the program. This first phase lasted a minimum of 14 days and often for months or years if the child denied use of drugs or the facility members deemed the child should not progress for any number of reasons. If Straight clients progressed to the second phase, then they would be allowed to spend the night at home, and only once they had convinced staff members that they understood their dependence on drugs and wanted to change their behavior. St. Petersburg Times reporter David Finkel described the emotional intensity of the humbling phase as follows: "Only when [a patient] is feeling worthless and miserable is he considered to be making progress."

Families would become more involved in the second phase. Straight staff would schedule one or more meetings for a client and his or her immediate family, and rap sessions would be held for groups of parents to attend by themselves or with their children. Siblings of Straight clients over the age of 8 were required to attend their own separate meetings called "sibling raps". As of 1987, Straight parents were required to comply with a list of rules that ran to six pages in length. Among these rules: both parents were required to be at home every night when their child was in the first or second phase of the program.

In the third phase overnight business travel was permitted, and in the fifth phase, vacation was permitted, but in both cases parents were required to submit their plans to Straight for approval. Parents could be asked to host other children in the program overnight, even when their own child was not present at home.

In the third phase of the Straight program, clients were allowed to return to school or to start a part-time job. However, clients were still expected to spend their evenings and weekends at the Straight facility, where they would take on new responsibilities, such as assisting with cleaning and greeting visitors.

In the fourth and fifth phase of the treatment, clients were only required to come to Straight three or four days a week instead of seven.

Fifth phase clients, children under age 18 with no professional training, would help lead group sessions. While the first, second, and third phases could be completed in a minimum of two or three weeks, clients were expected to spend at least three months in phase four and two months in phase five. At an absolute minimum, a young person could theoretically complete the entire Straight program in six months, but in typical cases, 10–14 months were required and sometimes longer periods of time, up to 28 months or longer, were necessary.

Straight "graduates" participated in follow-up group rap sessions, called "Aftercare", once or twice a week, sometimes accompanied by their parents, for the six months following their completion of the program. Graduates were also eligible to return to Straight as paid, part-time staff members, despite being a child with no professional counseling experience and being educated past a middle school level.

The St. Petersburg Times noted that Straight's treatment practices were designed as a "gentler" successor to an earlier program called The Seed, which was closed after an independent report noted that its methods were reminiscent of "highly-refined brainwashing techniques employed by the North Koreans during the 1950s."

==== Defining drug abuse ====
Straight officials took the position that drug use in all forms is harmful and requires treatment. Straight also deemed many children to be "dry druggies" saying they had "druggie behavior" and therefore needed the programming to prevent potential drug abuse in the future. In a 1983 speech in Bryan, Ohio, Straight administrator Dave Crock stated that the term "drug abuse" itself is problematic because it implies that occasional drug use might be acceptable while only more frequent use of drugs constitutes "abuse". In 1981, Straight's Executive Director, James Hartz, said that while his organization did not have a formal policy defining drug abuse, he personally felt that: "...A 14-year-old who did alcohol and pot and never got arrested, never skipped school – that person in our opinion needs to work through his or her relationship to that drug just as much as the person who is 16 and who was out [breaking and entering], ripping off and so on and so forth."

==== Program costs ====
Straight's St. Petersburg branch charged a monthly fee of $385 in 1987, or about $1,028 in 2023 dollars. In addition, families paid $1,089 ($2,908 in 2023 dollars) at the outset of the program and then a $1,600 evaluation fee ($4,272 in 2023 dollars). These fees varied per family based on financial assessment during the intake process. Many insurance companies did not cover Straight's services. Parents were regularly asked to make small contributions to the organization, participate in fundraising activities, and recruit five families per month to the program. In 1990, Straight's program in Yorba Linda, California charged about $1,400 a month, or about $3,249 in 2023 dollars.

==== Treatment effectiveness ====
A 1989 study in the Journal of Substance Abuse Treatment conducted interviews with 222 patients of Straight's Virginia facility at least six months after their treatment ended (two thirds of these patients had graduated from the program, while one-third had left before graduation). Before starting treatment at Straight, 97% of these individuals had used marijuana, 56% had used cocaine and 25% had used opiates such as heroin. After leaving the program, 26% reported using marijuana, 14% reported using cocaine and 4% reported using opiates. 35% of former clients reported feeling very satisfied with their experience at Straight, 35% reported feeling somewhat satisfied, 18% reported feeling somewhat dissatisfied and 12% reported feeling very dissatisfied. 53% of patients reported that Straight helped them "a lot", 21% reported that the program helped them "a fair amount", 18% reported that it helped them "a little" and 8% reported that it did not help them at all.

After following a young man through Straight for over a year, journalist David Finkel reported feeling ambivalent about the program. Finkel observed "phenomenal changes" in the subject of his articles, and noted that the young man had stopped using drugs and that his attitude and his relationship with his parents had improved dramatically. But Finkel also felt that Straight was "imperfect in many ways", and criticized the high staff turnover at all levels of the organization, the lack of diversity among Straight clients and the organization's policy of holding minors against their will, if a parent consented. Finkel described this last policy as "unnecessary" and "potentially abusive". Finkel concluded that he would not consider Straight for his child if she was using drugs experimentally, but that he might try the program if his child had a more severe drug problem and other treatment options, such as counseling, had not succeeded.

=== Rebranding ===
After being involuntarily dissolved in 1989 within the Florida Department of State's Division of Corporations, the organization was reinstated in 1992 and renamed the Drug Free America Foundation in 1995.

== Structure ==
=== Divisions ===
==== Save Our Society From Drugs ====
Save Our Society From Drugs
- Abbreviation: S.O.S.
- Formation: 1998
- Founder: Betty Sembler
- Type: 501(c)(4)
- Tax ID no.: 59-3470019
- Location: 333 3rd Ave N, Saint Petersburg, FL 33701
- Principal Officer: Betty Sembler
- Website: Official website

Save Our Society From Drugs (S.O.S.) is the lobbying arm of DFAF and a 501(c)(4) organization founded in 1998 by Betty Sembler. Between 2015 and 2019, S.O.S. hired the firm Jackson Lewis PC to lobby the federal government on issues of alcohol and drug abuse, law enforcement, crime, and criminal justice.

==== Students for Healthy Drug Policy ====
Students for Healthy Drug Policy (SDHP) is a DFAF's university campus organization. SDHP's first chapter was established at Florida State University in 2016.

==== National Drug-Free Workplace Alliance ====
The National Drug-Free Workplace Alliance (NDWA) is the "workplace division" of DFAF.

==== Drug Prevention Network of the Americas ====
The Drug Prevention Network of the Americas (DPNA) is a division of DFAF. DPNA credits itself with the formation of the Drug Prevention Network of Canada (DPNC), Chile Previene las Drogas (CHIPRED), Academia Boliviana de Dependencias, and Red de Universidades para la Prevencion de las Drogas (RUPRED).

==== Journal of Global Drug Policy and Practice ====
The foundation describes its journal as "a joint effort of the Institute on Global Drug Policy and the International Scientific and Medical Forum on Drug Abuse," both of which are themselves divisions of DFAF.

=== Leadership ===
Amy Ronshausen, is the current executive director. She succeeding Calvina Fay, who retired in April 2018 after 20 years leading the organization.

Former Florida Governor Jeb Bush, former Drug Enforcement Administration Administrator Karen Tandy, and Congressman Dan Lungren of California have served on the advisory board in the past, at least from 2009 through 2011.

== Projects ==
In 2005, DFAF received funding from the US Department of Justice Office of Juvenile Justice and Delinquency Prevention for the foundation's "True Compassion" campaign.
