= David L. Paul =

American businessman (1939–2022)

- Born: May 1, 1939; Miami Beach, Florida, U.S.
- Died: January 18, 2022 (aged 82); New York City, U.S.
- Education: Wharton School, University of Pennsylvania (B.A.); Columbia University (M.B.A); Columbia University (J.D)
- Occupations: real estate developer, banker, philanthropist
- Spouse(s): Lynn P. Goelet (divorced); Joy Fererh Germont Simons (divorced); Sandy Paul
- Children: 3
- Family: Bruce Wolosoff (brother-in-law); Robert A. Paul (brother)

David Lewis Paul (May 1, 1939 – January 18, 2022) was an American banker, real estate developer, philanthropist, and founder of CenTrust Bank.

== Biography ==
Paul was born in on May 1, 1939, in Miami to a Jewish family, the son of Ruth (née Goldstein) and Isadore Paul. His father founded a chain of dry cleaning stores and died when he was ten. His mother then moved with her two sons to Scranton, Pennsylvania. Paul graduated from the Cheshire Academy in Cheshire, Connecticut and then the Wharton School of the University of Pennsylvania.

He started his career in Connecticut where his company, Paul Properties, built two controversial apartment buildings. He then took control of a Massachusetts Real Estate Investment Trust called the Westport Company. In 1979, Westport purchased the American Furniture Mart in Chicago for $6.5 million with plans to convert it into apartments. In 1983, Paul purchased the near bankrupt Dade Savings and Loan Association through the transfer of 92% of his interest in Westport, renaming it CenTrust Bank. By 1988, CenTrust was the largest thrift institution in the southeastern United States with $8.2 billion in assets. He built the $90 million, I.M. Pei-designed CenTrust Tower. In November 1988, he was admitted to the Non-Group, a highly influential group of Miami-Dade business elites.

In 1989, CenTrust lost $119 million and in 1990, Centrust lost $1.7 billion and was seized by the federal government after "excessive and inappropriate expenses and investments." Paul was ousted as chairman.

== Conviction ==
On November 25, 1993, Paul was convicted of fraud in Federal Court for making personal use of CenTrust's funds while the savings and loan was failing. Paul was convicted on 68 counts consisting of 47 counts of bank fraud, 9 of misapplication of Centrust funds, 5 of filing false tax returns, 4 of mail fraud, 2 of obstruction of regulators, one count of conspiracy and one count of making false entries on Centrust books. Facing a maximum of 350 years in prison he was sentenced to 11 years in prison and ordered to pay $65 million ($60 million in restitution and a $5 million fine). He was released in 2004.

== Philanthropy and political contributions ==
Paul donated $500,000 to the University of Miami and $100,000 to Barry University. Paul served as the head of the governing body of Jackson Memorial Hospital. Through his CenTrust Political Action Committee, Paul donated to both Joe Biden's and Richard Gephardt's presidential campaigns as well as the Democratic Senatorial Campaign Committee.

== Personal life ==
Paul was married three times. In 1965, he married Lynn Pamela Goelet of the influential Huguenot Goelet family in a Jewish ceremony at the Plaza Hotel in Manhattan; they had two sons, Michael and David, before they divorced. He was introduced to his second wife, Joy Fererh Germont Simons (sister of composer Bruce Wolosoff) by fellow real estate developer and sometimes partner Sol Atlas; they divorced 2 months later. Paul's third marriage was to Sandy Paul; they had one daughter, Deanna, before divorcing and she remarried real estate developer Stephen Muss.

Paul died from COVID-19 related causes on the morning of January 18, 2022, at Mt. Sinai hospital in New York City.
