= Leslie H. Gelb =

American academic, correspondent, and columnist (1937–2019)

Les Gelb

President of the Council on Foreign Relations
- In office 1993 – July 16, 2003
- Preceded by: Alton Frye
- Succeeded by: Richard N. Haass

4th Director of the Bureau of Political-Military Affairs
- In office February 23, 1977 – June 30, 1979
- President: Jimmy Carter
- Preceded by: George S. Vest
- Succeeded by: Reginald Bartholomew

Personal details
- Born: Leslie Howard Gelb; March 4, 1937 New Rochelle, New York, U.S.
- Died: August 31, 2019 (aged 82) New York City, New York, U.S.
- Party: Democratic
- Education: Tufts University (BA); Harvard University (MA, PhD)

Leslie Howard "Les" Gelb (March 4, 1937 – August 31, 2019) was an American government official, academic and journalist. He was a correspondent and columnist for The New York Times and served as the 4th Director of the Bureau of Political-Military Affairs from 1977 to 1979. He was the President and President Emeritus of the Council on Foreign Relations.

== Background ==
Leslie Gelb was born in New Rochelle, New York in 1937 to a Jewish family. His parents were Max and Dorothy (Klein) Gelb. He received a B.A. from Tufts University in 1959, and an M.A. in 1961 and Ph.D. in 1964 from Harvard University. Starting in 1964 and ending in 1967 he was Assistant Professor of Government at Wesleyan University.

He married Judith Cohen on August 2, 1959, and lived in New York City. They had three children. He received the American Father of the Year award in 1993.

== Career ==
Gelb was Executive Assistant for Senator Jacob Javits from 1966 to 1967. He was director of Policy Planning and Arms Control for International Security Affairs at the Department of Defense from 1967 to 1969, winning the Pentagon's highest award, the Distinguished Service Medal. Robert McNamara appointed Gelb as director of the project that produced the controversial Pentagon Papers on the Vietnam War; Gelb led the team of 36 analysts (including Daniel Ellsberg, Paul Warnke, Morton Halperin, Richard Holbrooke, John Galvin, Paul F. Gorman, Richard Moorstein, Hans Heymann, and Melvin Gurtov) in drafting the 47-volume, 7,000-page study of the war's history, presenting it to McNamara and his successor Clark Clifford in early 1969, only for them to not read it. From 1969 to 1973, Gelb was a Senior Fellow at the Brookings Institution.

Gelb was diplomatic correspondent at The New York Times from 1973 to 1977.

Gelb served as an Assistant Secretary of State in the Carter Administration from 1977 to 1979, serving as director of the Bureau of Politico-Military Affairs and winning the Distinguished Honor Award, the highest award of the US State Department. In 1980 he co-authored The Irony of Vietnam which won the Woodrow Wilson Foundation Book Award in 1981. From 1980 to 1981, he was also a Senior Associate at the Carnegie Endowment for International Peace.

Gelb returned to the Times in 1981. Until 1993, he was in turn its national security correspondent, deputy editorial page editor, editor of the op-ed page, and columnist. The period included his leading role on the Times team that won a Pulitzer Prize for Explanatory Journalism in 1986 for a six-part comprehensive series on the Star Wars Strategic Defense Initiative. In 1983, he worked as a producer on the ABC documentary The Crisis Game, which received an Emmy award in 1984.

In 1993, Gelb became President of the Council on Foreign Relations, and then its President Emeritus from 2003 until his death in 2019. From 2003 to 2015, he served as Board Senior Fellow there. In addition to his work at Council on Foreign Relations, Gelb was also a member of the International Institute for Strategic Studies and was a fellow of the American Academy of Arts and Sciences.

Gelb served as the chairman of the advisory board for the National Security Network, which identifies itself as a "progressive" think tank, and served on the boards of directors of several non-profit organizations including Carnegie Endowment, the School of International and Public Affairs, Columbia University, the James Baker Institute at Rice University, the Watson Institute for International Studies at Brown University, and the John F. Kennedy School of Government Center on Press, Politics and Public Policy. He served on the board of directors of the Iraq and Afghanistan Veterans of America and was a member of the board of advisors of the Truman Project and America Abroad Media. Gelb served on the board of directors of the Center for the National Interest and of the Diplomacy Center Foundation. He also sat on the editorial advisory committee of Democracy magazine, on the advisory council of The National Interest magazine, and on the advisory board of the Peter G. Peterson Foundation. Gelb served on several commercial boards including Legg Mason closed end funds (since 2003), Aberdeen India and Asia Tigers funds (since 2003), and Centre Partners (since 2005). He was Trustee Emeritus of Tufts University.

Gelb was a contributor to The Daily Beast, a news aggregation site.

On August 31, 2019, Gelb died.

== Iraq War ==
Gelb initially supported the Iraq War but later said that his "initial support for the war was symptomatic of unfortunate tendencies within the foreign policy community, namely the disposition and incentives of supporting wars to retain political and professional credibility."

His postwar plan, developed in collaboration with then-Senator Joe Biden in 2005, called for a strengthening of federalism in Iraq.

== Selected publications ==
- Power Rules: How Common Sense Can Rescue American Foreign Policy (2009) ISBN 978-0-06-171454-2
- Anglo-American Relations, 1945–1950: Toward a Theory of Alliances (1988)
- Claiming the Heavens: The New York Times Complete Guide to the Star Wars Debate (coauthor, Crown Publishing Group, 1988)
- Our Own Worst Enemy: The Unmaking of American Foreign Policy (1984, co-author with I. M. Destler and Anthony Lake)
- The Irony of Vietnam: The System Worked (1979)

Political offices
Preceded by George S. Vest	Assistant Secretary of State for Political-Military Affairs; 1977–1979	Succeeded by Reginald Bartholomew
