= Robert Sherwood Dillon =

American diplomat

Robert Dillon
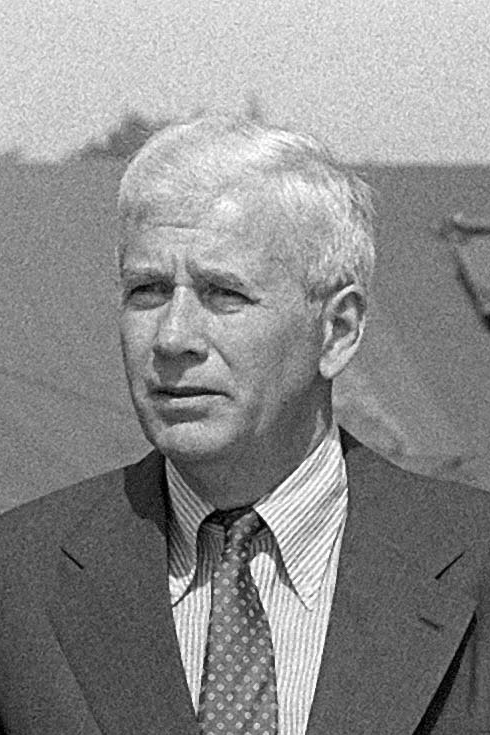
- Dillon in 1982

United States Ambassador to Lebanon
- In office June 26, 1981 – October 11, 1983
- President: Jimmy Carter; Ronald Reagan
- Preceded by: John Gunther Dean
- Succeeded by: Reginald Bartholomew

Personal details
- Born: Robert Sherwood Dillon; January 7, 1929 (age 97) Chicago, Illinois, U.S.
- Spouses: Caroline Dillon (m. 1951; died 2013); Nancy Boardman Eddy (m. 2020)
- Education: Duke University (BA)

Military service
- Allegiance: United States
- Branch/service: United States Army
- Years of service: 1947–1948

Robert Sherwood Dillon (born January 7, 1929) was the United States Ambassador to Lebanon from 1981 to 1983. He was born in 1929 in Chicago and attended Duke University, graduating in 1951.

Dillon served in the US army for eighteen months before being discharged and continuing his education at Duke University. After receiving his B.A. in English Literature in 1951, he served as a CIA intelligence officer with Chinese Nationalist irregular forces. Following his time in the CIA, he joined the Foreign Service. Dillon spent more than 30 years in the Foreign Service with assignments including Venezuela, Turkey, Malaysia, Egypt, Lebanon. He served as Deputy Chief of Mission in Malaysia, Turkey and Egypt and oversaw the negotiations and security of hostages during The Kuala Lumpur Hostage Crisis. Dillon served as US Ambassador to Lebanon for two years, surviving the 1983 United States embassy bombing, before retiring from the foreign service in 1983 with the rank of Career Minister.

After his time in the Foreign Service, Dillon joined the United Nations as Assistant Secretary General and later served for five years as Deputy Commissioner General of the United Nations Relief and Works Agency for Palestine Refugees in the Near East. In 1988, Dillon became President and CEO of the non-profit, America-Mideast Education and Training Services, Inc., which he left in 1995. From 1994 to 1995, Dillon worked for the UN as Special Humanitarian Envoy for Rwanda and Burundi. After which he worked as for six months with the Department of State. Dillon currently resides in Arlington, Virginia and has authored a memoir and biography of his father, Dale Crowell Dillon.

== Books ==
- One of the Very Best Men by Robert Sherwood Dillon (Five and Ten Press, March 2004) ISBN 1-89-237919-8 (Memoir)
- An American Soldier in World War I by Robert Sherwood Dillon (Five and Ten Press, June 2005) ISBN 1-89-237923-6 (Biography of Dale Crowell Dillon)

Diplomatic posts
Preceded by John Gunther Dean	United States Ambassador to Lebanon; 1981–1983	Succeeded by Reginald Bartholomew
