= Evan G. Galbraith =

American diplomat (1928–2008)

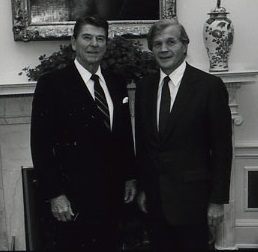
- Ronald Reagan and Galbraith in Oval Office in 1981

United States Ambassador to France
- In office December 2, 1981 – July 15, 1985
- President: Ronald Reagan
- Preceded by: Arthur A. Hartman
- Succeeded by: Joe M. Rodgers

Personal details
- Born: Evan Griffith Galbraith; July 2, 1928 Toledo, Ohio
- Died: January 21, 2008 (aged 79)
- Party: Republican
- Education: Yale University; Harvard Law School

Evan "Van" Griffith Galbraith (July 2, 1928 – January 21, 2008) was the United States Ambassador to France 1981 to 1985 for Ronald Reagan; and Secretary of Representative to Europe & NATO 2002 to 2007 for Donald Rumsfeld.

Both in Toledo, Ohio, Galbraith graduated from Ottawa Hills High School in 1946 then Yale University in 1950, as a member of Skull and Bones) and Harvard Law School.

Galbraith served on active duty in the Navy from 1953 to 1957, his position attached to the Central Intelligence Agency.

From 1960 to 1961, he was the confidential assistant to the Secretary of Commerce under Dwight Eisenhower.

A close personal friend to William F. Buckley, Jr. who he had met while they were both studying at Yale.

Prior to his post as Ambassador to France under President Ronald Reagan, Galbraith spent more than twenty years in Europe, primarily as an investment banker. He started his banking career at Morgan Guaranty in Paris selling and designing bonds and later became the Managing Director of Dillon Read in London in 1969. In the 1990s, he was an Advisory Director of Morgan Stanley in New York, Chairman of the Board of National Review, and a member of the board of the Groupe Lagardère S.A. Paris. Together with Daimler Benz, the Groupe Lagardère S.A. controls EADS (European Aerospace and Defense Systems), Europe's largest defense contractor and principal owner of Airbus. Galbraith also served on several other commercial boards and until 1998, was Chairman of the Board of LVMH (Moët Hennessy Louis Vuitton) USA. He also served as a Member of the Board of Directors of the Overseas Private Investment Corporation during the latter years of Reagan's administration. Secretary of Defense Donald Rumsfeld appointed Evan G. Galbraith as his representative in Europe and the defense advisor to the U.S. mission to NATO. In making this appointment, Rumsfeld said, "I wanted a seasoned, vigorous representative in Europe who will bring experienced leadership to this important mission."

Galbraith was also a member of the New York Young Republican Club, Center for Security Policy, Council of Foreign Relations and the Bohemian Club in San Francisco. He was also a member of the board of directors of Club Med Inc.

He was married twice. His first marriage, to Nancy Carothers Burdick, in 1955, ended in divorce in 1964. His second marriage was to Marie "Bootsie" Rockwell in 1964. He has three surviving children, all of his second marriage: Evan Griffith, Christina Marie and John Hamilton; and four grandchildren, Everest Griffith, Eva Quin, Sofia Christina Galbraith and Melinda Marie Galbraith. Two of his children predeceased him. A daughter by his first marriage, Alexandra Galbraith Stearns, died in 2005, and his eldest child by his second marriage, Julie Helene, died at age six in 1972 of a brain tumor. He is buried in Arlington National Cemetery.

== Works ==
- Ambassador in Paris: The Reagan Years. Washington, DC: Regnery Gateway, 1987. ISBN 089526577X / ISBN 978-0895265777.

Introduction by William F. Buckley, Jr.

Diplomatic posts
Preceded by Arthur A. Hartman	U.S. Ambassador to France; 1981–1985	Succeeded by Joe M. Rodgers
