= David C. Paul =

Globus Medical

- Born: 1966 or 1967 (age 58–59); India
- Education: University of Madras; Temple University
- Occupation: Businessman
- Known for: Founder and executive chairman, Globus Medical

David C. Paul (born 1966/1967) is an American billionaire businessman and the founder and executive chairman of Globus Medical, a medical device manufacturer.

As of February 2024, his net worth was estimated at US$1.4 billion.

== Education ==
David Paul is an engineer by training, receiving a B.S. in mechanical engineering from the University of Madras. He moved to the United States from India to earn his M.S. in Computer Integrated Mechanical Engineering Systems from Temple University.

== Personal life ==
Paul is married, and lives in Audubon, Pennsylvania, US.
