= CenTrust Bank =

- Company type: Public
- Traded as: American Stock Exchange: DLP
- Industry: Savings and loan
- Founded: 1934; 92 years ago
- Defunct: February 2, 1990; 36 years ago
- Fate: Insolvency
- Successor: Great Western Bank
- Headquarters: Miami, Florida, United States
- Key people: David Paul

CenTrust Bank, A State Savings Bank was an American savings and loan association based in Miami, Florida that failed in 1990. Its failure in 1990 was one of the largest and costliest failures of the savings and loan crisis.

== Background and downfall ==
Dade Savings & Loan Association opened in 1934. In 1983, the failing thrift, with 32 branches and $2.2 billion in assets, was acquired by real estate developer David L. Paul for $32 million and the following year was renamed CenTrust Savings & Loan Association. It grew rapidly to become the largest thrift in the southeastern United States, with over $9 billion in assets at its peak in 1989.

The bank was placed into government conservatorship in February 1990, with Great Western Bank acquiring the bank's assets in June 1990. CenTrust had $8.2 billion in assets at that time and was the 23rd largest thrift in the country. The failure resulted in an estimated $1.7 billion loss to the government at the time it was seized.

Chairman and CEO David Paul was convicted in November 1993 in federal court on 68 counts of tax fraud, obstruction of justice and misapplication of bank funds. He was sentenced to 11 years in prison and required to pay $60 million in restitution and a $5 million fine. He later pled guilty to 29 counts of securities violations. He was released from prison in 2004. The government charged that Paul had used bank funds for personal reasons such as making improvements on his home and paying the expenses on his $7 million yacht "Grand Cru". In addition the bank had also bought the sailboat "Bodacious" for $233,000. The bank acquired a $29 million art collection, including the Peter Paul Rubens painting "Portrait of a Man as the God Mars" for $13.2 million, which Paul kept at his house.

The bank's headquarters were located in the newly built CenTrust Tower (now Miami Tower), a Miami landmark designed by I. M. Pei and featured in the opening credits of the television series "Miami Vice." CenTrust's executive offices were opulent, featuring gold-plated plumbing, gold-leaf ceilings, a $1 million Italian marble staircase, and a bulletproof shower door.

When the Financial Institutions Reform, Recovery and Enforcement Act of 1989 was passed, it banned the purchase of junk bonds by thrifts and required them to dispose of their holdings by 1995. They were also required to carry the bonds on the bank's books at market value, not face value. The act also disallowed supervisory goodwill by phasing it out through 1995. This resulted in the bank becoming insolvent.

== CenTrust and Bank of Credit and Commerce International ==
Bank of Credit and Commerce International (BCCI), through nominee Saudi businessman Ghaith Pharaon became CenTrust's largest shareholder with 28% ownership. Pharaon was also BCCI's nominee owner of Independence Bank of Los Angeles, as well as National Bank of Georgia, which was formerly owned by Bert Lance, a close friend of former United States President Jimmy Carter. Pharaon was indicted in 1991, and again in 1993 under a revised indictment, but remained a fugitive until his death in 2017. The indictments covered the nominee ownerships of the Georgia and Los Angeles banks, as well as his securities trading activities at CenTrust. BCCI had bought $25 million in subordinated debentures out of a $150 million offering in a sham transaction in 1988, with the securities bought back two months later by CenTrust at a loss.

== CenTrust and Drexel Burnham Lambert ==
CenTrust was one of the largest buyers of junk bonds (high yield bonds) in the country, with over $1.4 billion on the bank's books at its peak. It was part of Drexel Burnham Lambert's "daisy chain" of junk bond buyers like Lincoln Savings in Irvine, Imperial Savings in San Diego, Gibraltar Savings in Simi Valley, Silverado Savings & Loan in Denver, and Columbia Savings in Beverly Hills.

CenTrust had dealings with Lincoln Savings' parent American Continental Corporation when it bought $9 million in Playtex stock from American Continental Corp. and then sold $9 million in stock of Memorex to American Continental Corp. The intent was to boost the prices of the stocks on the thinly traded securities and book bogus profits. Both of the stocks were issued by companies that were clients of Drexel Burnham Lambert.

== CenTrust and its political influence ==
Paul extensively used CenTrust's money to gain political influence, with its political action committee contributing $328,000 to campaigns and other political causes. Paul was co-chairman of the Democratic Senatorial Campaign Committee with Senator John Kerry (D-MA), with CenTrust contributing $30,000 in political action funds to the committee. The committee also leased Paul's yacht for fund-raisers. Paul met with Kerry five times in 1988, while Kerry was investigating BCCI for money laundering. Paul flew in six chefs from France for a $122,000 "Great Chef's Party." Its 61 guests included Senator Kerry. (Kerry later wrote an opinion piece for The New York Times entitled "Where Is the S&L Money?")

Paul met four times with chairman of the Federal Home Loan Bank M. Danny Wall. He also had meetings with Senators Bob Graham (D-FL), John Breaux (D-LA), Tim Wirth (D-CO), Ted Kennedy (D-MA), Joe Biden (D-DE), Alan Cranston (D-CA), and Donald W. Riegle Jr. (D-MI).(The latter two senators were also members of the Keating Five.)

Miami Beach mayor Alex Daoud was convicted of taking $35,000 in bribes to help Paul obtain permits to expand the dock at his house on La Gorce Island for his yacht "Grand Cru".

== See also ==
- List of largest U.S. bank failures
