= American Momentum Bank =

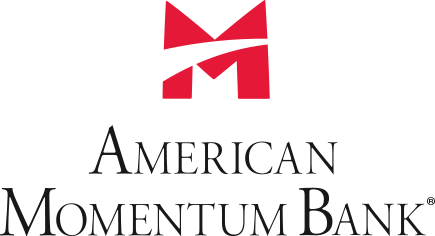
- Industry: Finance
- Founded: October 25, 2006
- Headquarters: College Station, Texas, United States
- Number of locations: 31 (2026)
- Key people: Donald A. Adam - Chairman, James L. Wolfe - President / Chief Operating Officer
- Products: Commercial and retail banking, mortgage financing and servicing, consumer finance and asset management
- Total assets: US$2.85 billion (June 30, 2026)
- Website: www.americanmomentum.bank

American Momentum Bank started in 2006 as the largest startup market capitalization of any financial institution in Florida state history with $100 million in start-up capital.

American Momentum Bank is headquartered in College Station, Texas. American Momentum Bank is also a mortgage lender and a regional leader in online banking. They acquired LandMark Bank of Florida and Southshore Community Bank in 2011. In 2012, they completed their acquisition of Brazos Valley Bank in College Station, Texas and switched to a national bank charter. It absorbed Commercial State Bank of Andrews, Texas in January 2019 and Security Bank of Midland, Texas in February 2020.
