= Miami Tower =

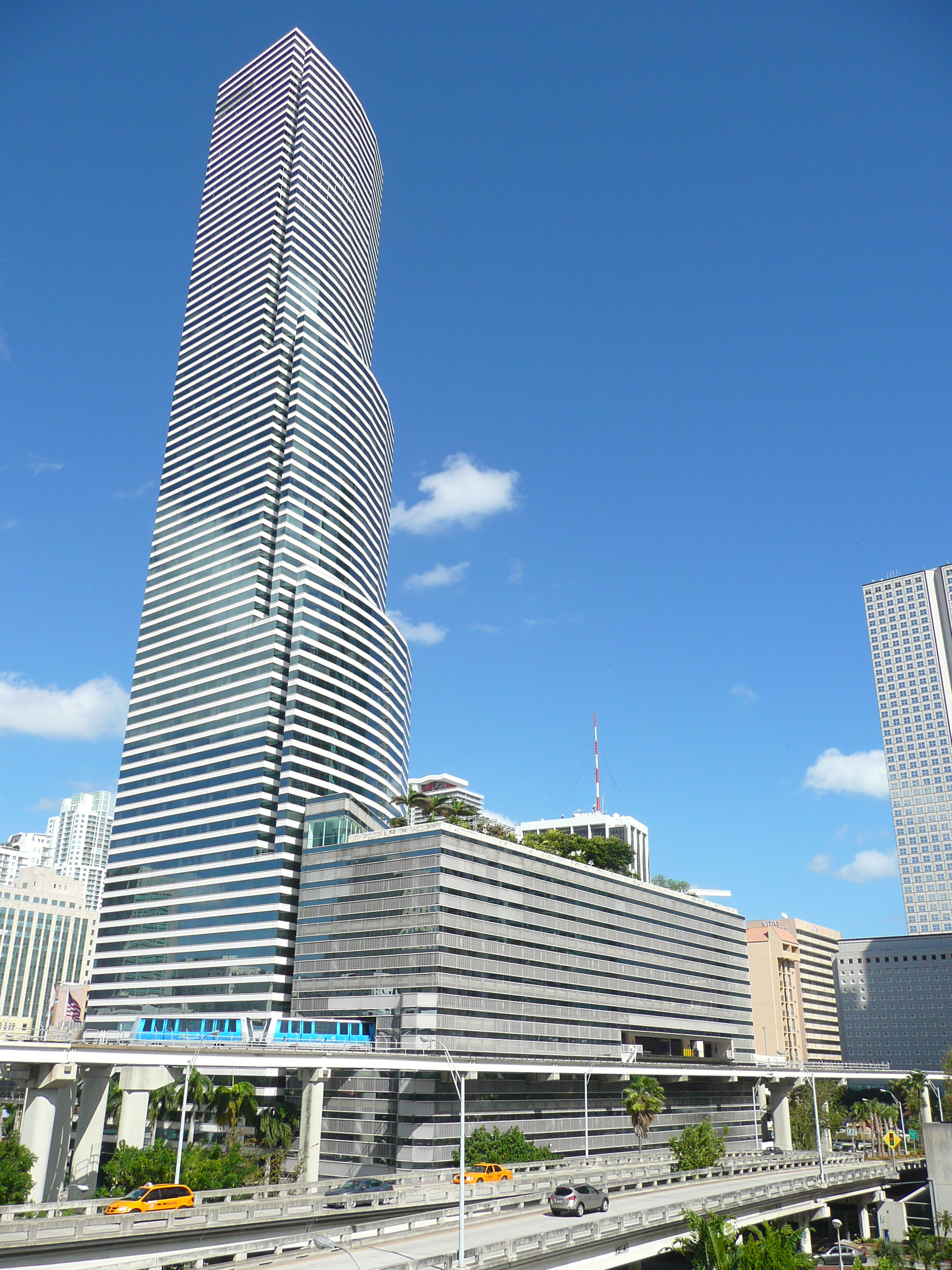
- Miami Tower in Downtown Miami

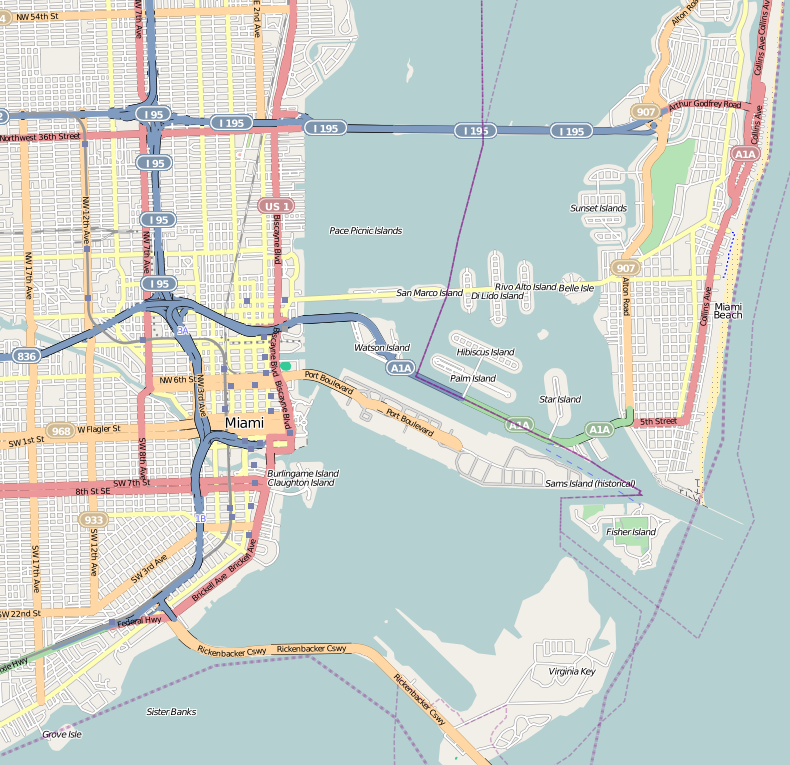
- Location within Central Miami Miami Tower (Florida)
- Former names: CenTrust Tower; NationsBank Tower; TotalBank Tower; Bank of America Tower at International Place

General information
- Type: Commercial office
- Location: 100 Southeast 2nd Street; Miami, Florida
- Coordinates: 25.7720°N 80.1912°W
- Construction started: 1983
- Completed: 1987
- Opening: 1987
- Owner: CP Group and DRA Advisors
- Management: CP Group

Height
- Roof: 625 ft (191 m)
- Top floor: 47

Technical details
- Floor count: 47
- Floor area: 1,160,000 sq ft (108,000 m^{2})
- Lifts/elevators: 19

Design and construction
- Architect: Pei Cobb Freed & Partners
- Developer: Centrust Savings Bank
- Structural engineer: Crouse-Honderich
- Main contractor: The George Hyman Construction Co.

Website
- Official website

The Miami Tower (previously known as CenTrust Tower and Bank of America Tower) is a 47-story, landmark office skyscraper in Miami, Florida, United States. It is located in central Downtown. It is currently the 21st tallest building in Miami and Florida. On April 18, 2012, the AIA's Florida Chapter placed it on its list of Florida Architecture: 100 Years. 100 Places as the Bank of America Tower. In 2022, the office skyscraper was purchased by DRA Advisors and CP Group, the largest office landlord in Downtown Miami and Florida.

== History ==
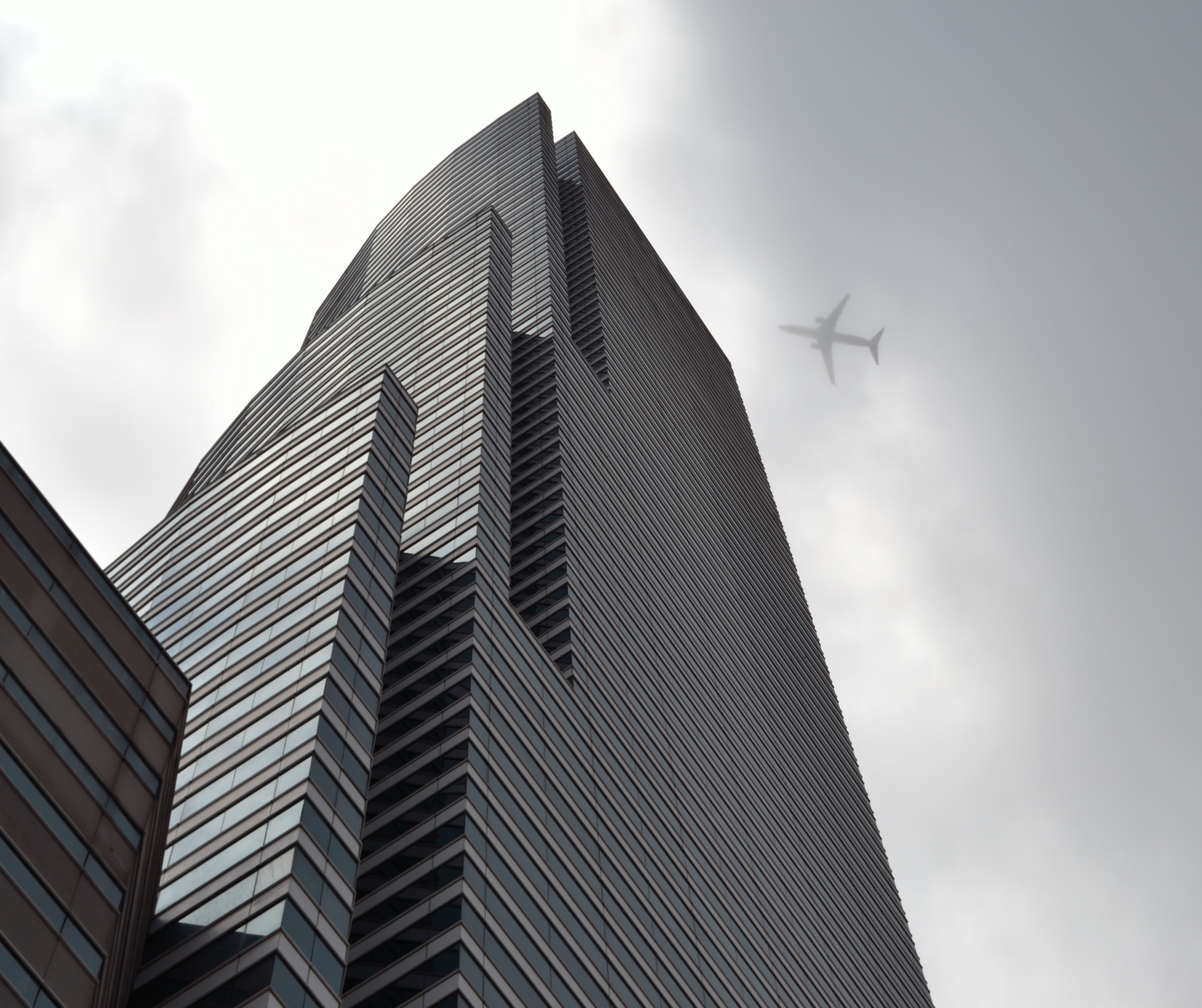
Ground level perspective.

Built for CenTrust Bank in 1987, the 47-story building ranks in the top twenty tallest skyscrapers in Miami and in Florida at a height of 625 feet (191 m) and is known for its elaborate night-time illuminations and its dramatic three glass tiers. Designed by the Pei Cobb Freed & Partners architectural firm, the tower consists of two separate structures: A 10-story parking garage owned by the city and the 47-story office tower built upon the air rights of the garage. Preliminary planning for the tower began in February 1980; construction on the garage began by November. The garage was completed in February 1983 and the tower began construction a year later. In August 1984, while the tower was under construction, a 5-alarm fire began on the ninth floor; construction was subsequently delayed for several weeks. On December 15, 1985, the tower was lit for the first time in Miami Dolphins aqua and snowflakes.

By mid-1986, the tower's exterior was complete and the grand opening for the complex was set for early fall that same year. Due to the uneven settling of the tower's foundation to one side by several inches, and the resulting misalignment of the tower's elevator rails, the grand opening for the complex was delayed until February 1987. The complete complex featured the world's only elevated metro station in a skyscraper (Knight Center station). It also gained notoriety for its luxurious interiors, including a skylobby on the 11th floor covered in marble and gold and a 10,000 sq ft (930 m^{2}) outdoor terrace. Also its indoor gym features mahogany cabinets. The tower is connected to the James L. Knight Center by a pedestrian walkway and on the first floor is a retail spine covered with green marble. The tower contains 1.16 million square feet (108,000 m^{2}) with 503,000 sq ft (46,700 m^{2}) of office space and a 535,000 sq ft (49,700 m^{2}), 1,500 space parking garage.

The tower can be seen in the "Streetwise" episode of Miami Vice which aired on December 5, 1986, as well as in the opening credits of the show from season 3.

The building appears during the end credits of the 1986 film Flight Of The Navigator in an aerial shot of Miami. The top floors can clearly be seen still under construction.

The roof of the building was the set of Gloria Estefan's 1994 video for "Turn The Beat Around". The building is also one of many featured on the backdrop of the stage on The Tonight Show.

On January 1, 2010, the building was renamed the Miami Tower.

== Many colors of the tower ==
The tower's three tiers allow it to have multiple color schemes in tribute to certain holidays and seasons. In 2012, a $1.5 million LED system was installed on the tower to allow for more elaborate displays with a much quicker transition time. Below are some examples of the various colors used:

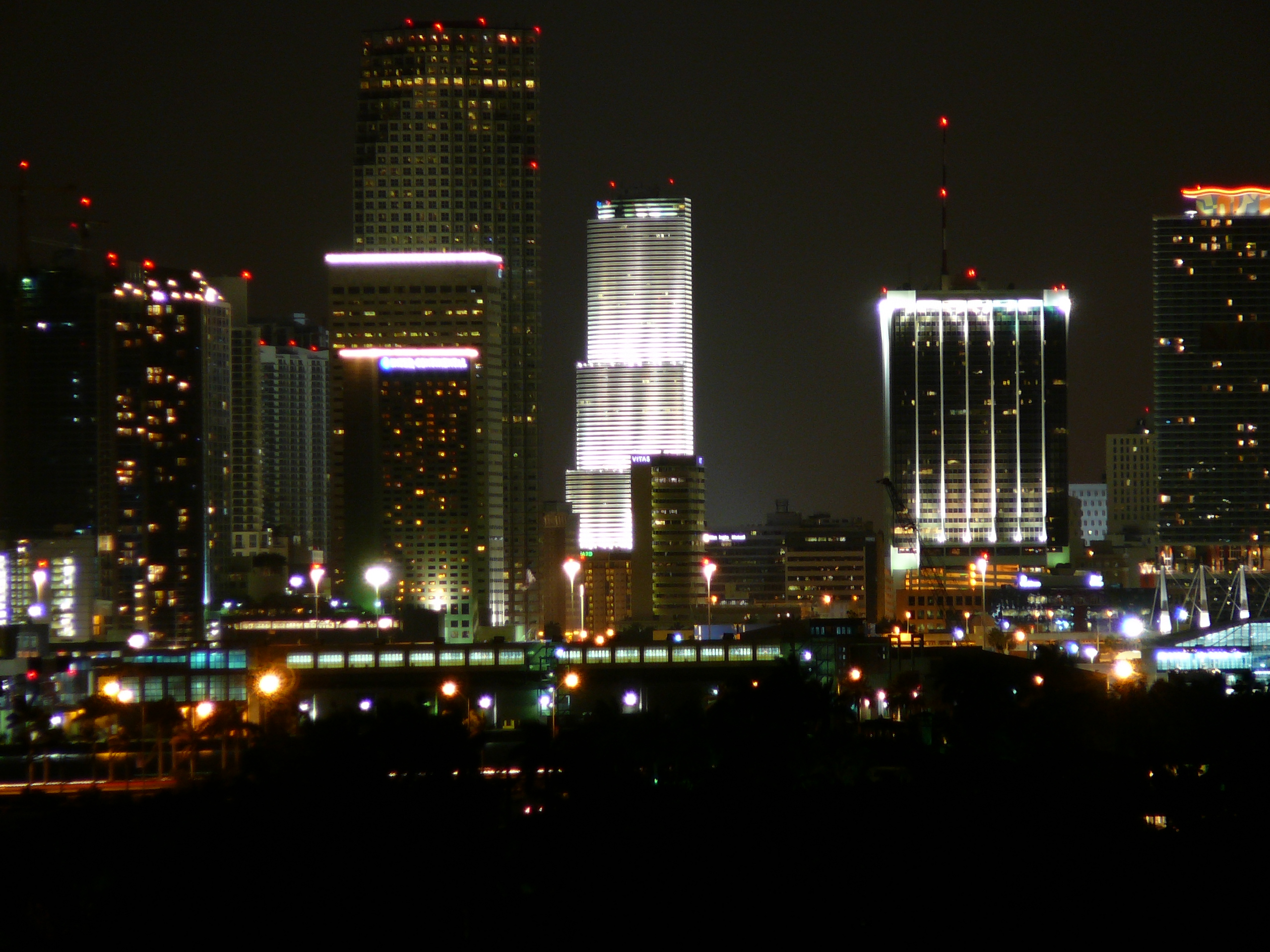
Tower lit white on most nights of the year

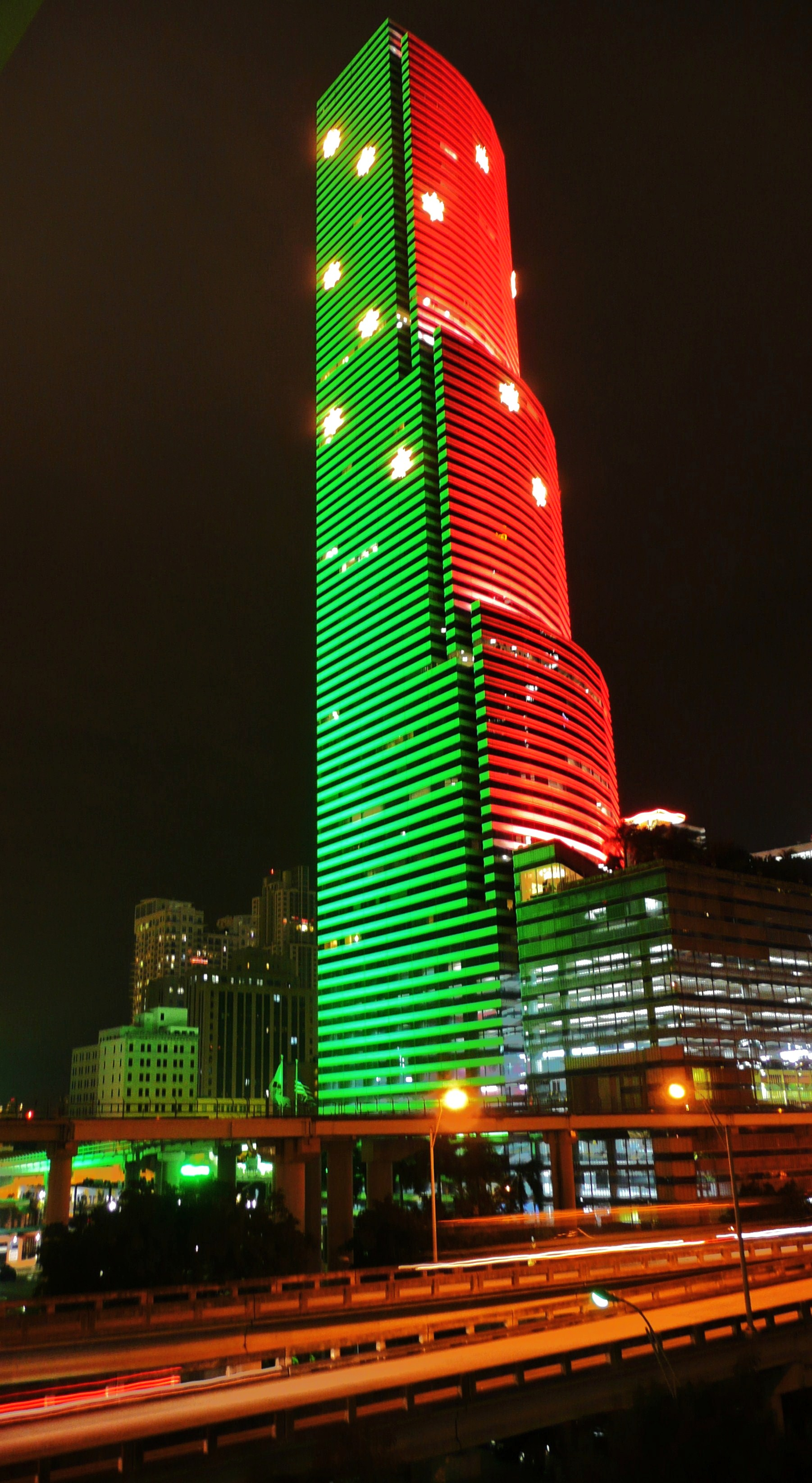
Tower lit red and green for Christmas Season 2010

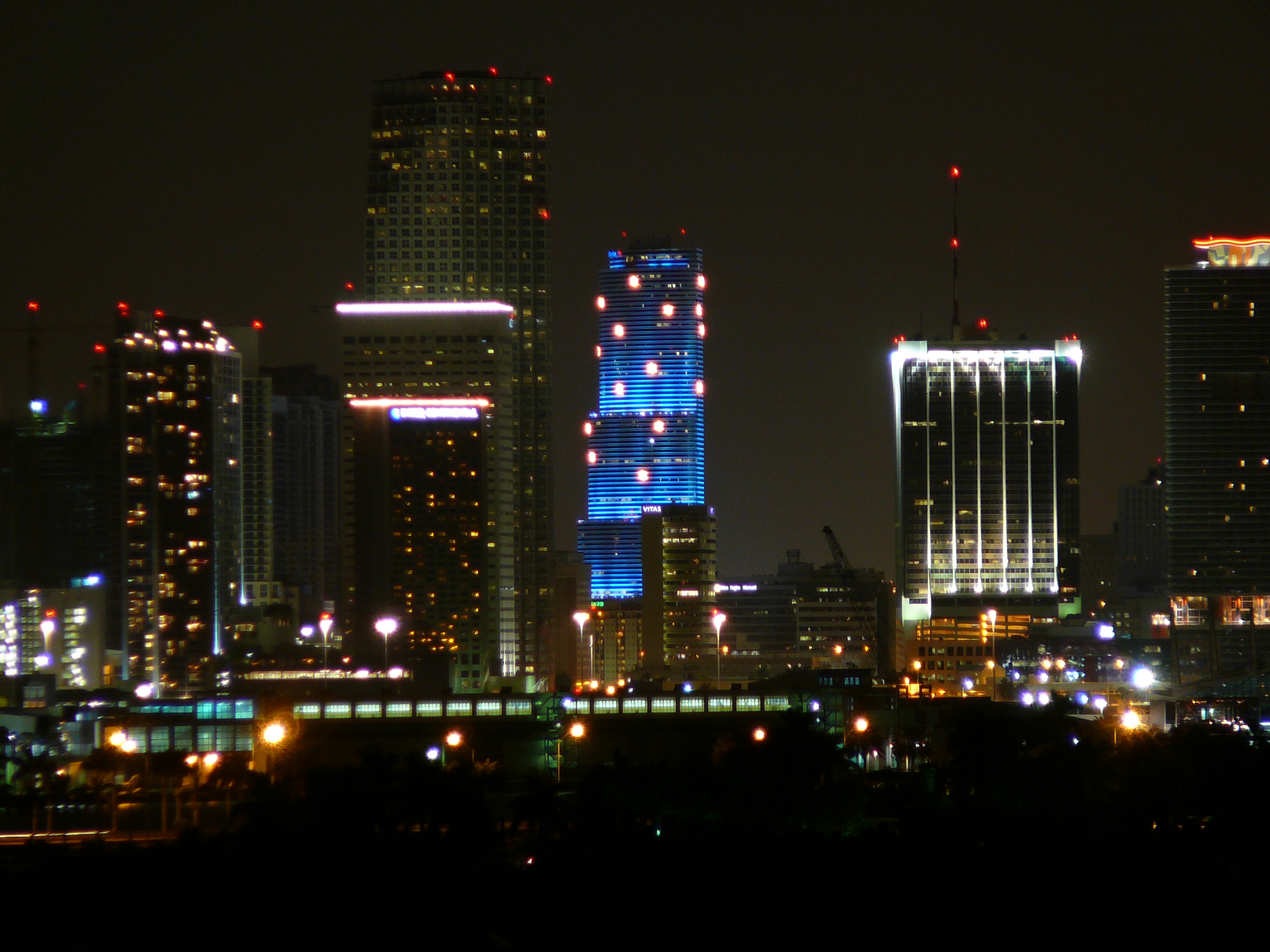
Tower lit blue and decorated with snowflake lights for Christmas Seasons before 2010

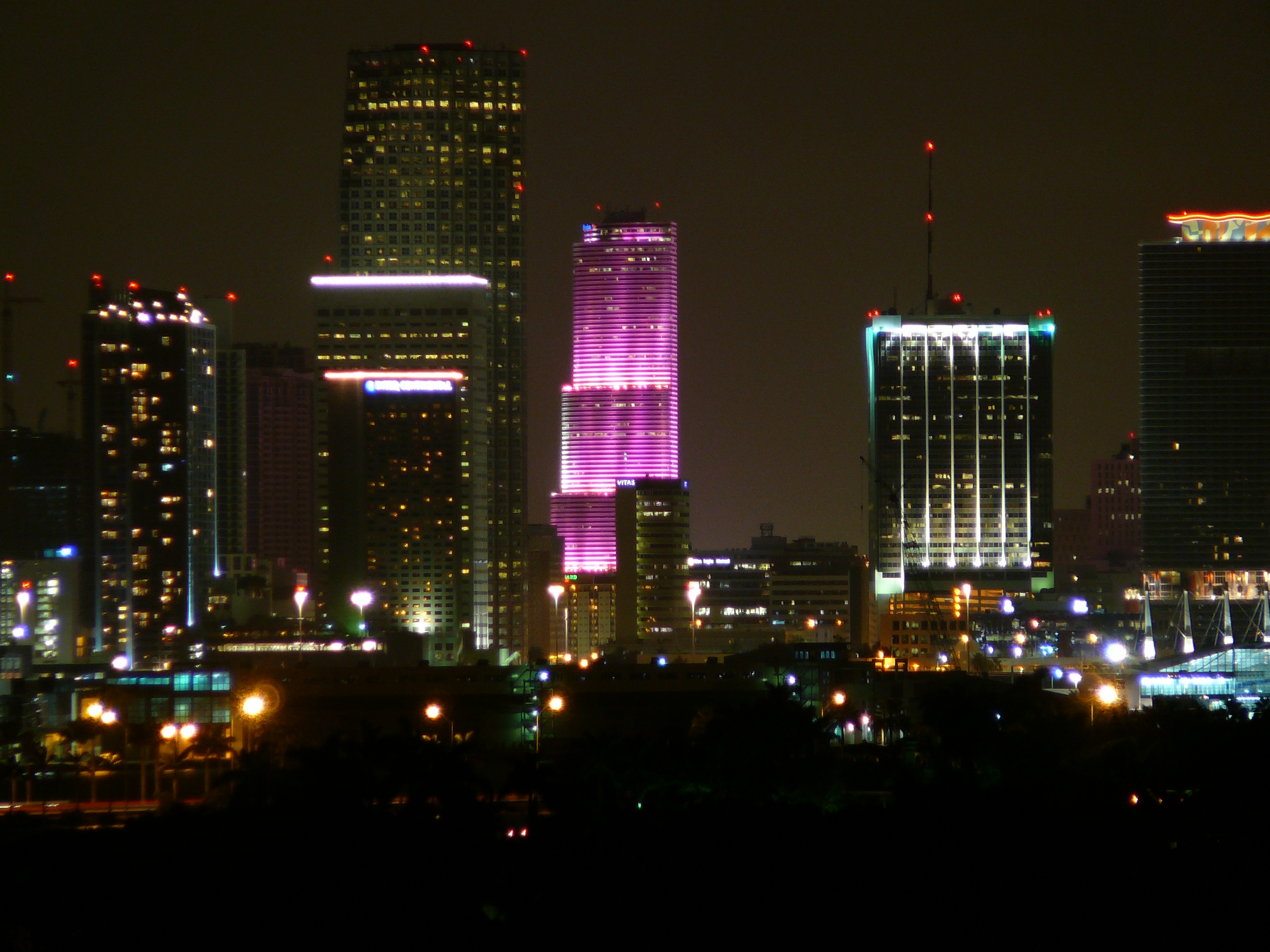
Tower lit pink for National Breast cancer awareness month

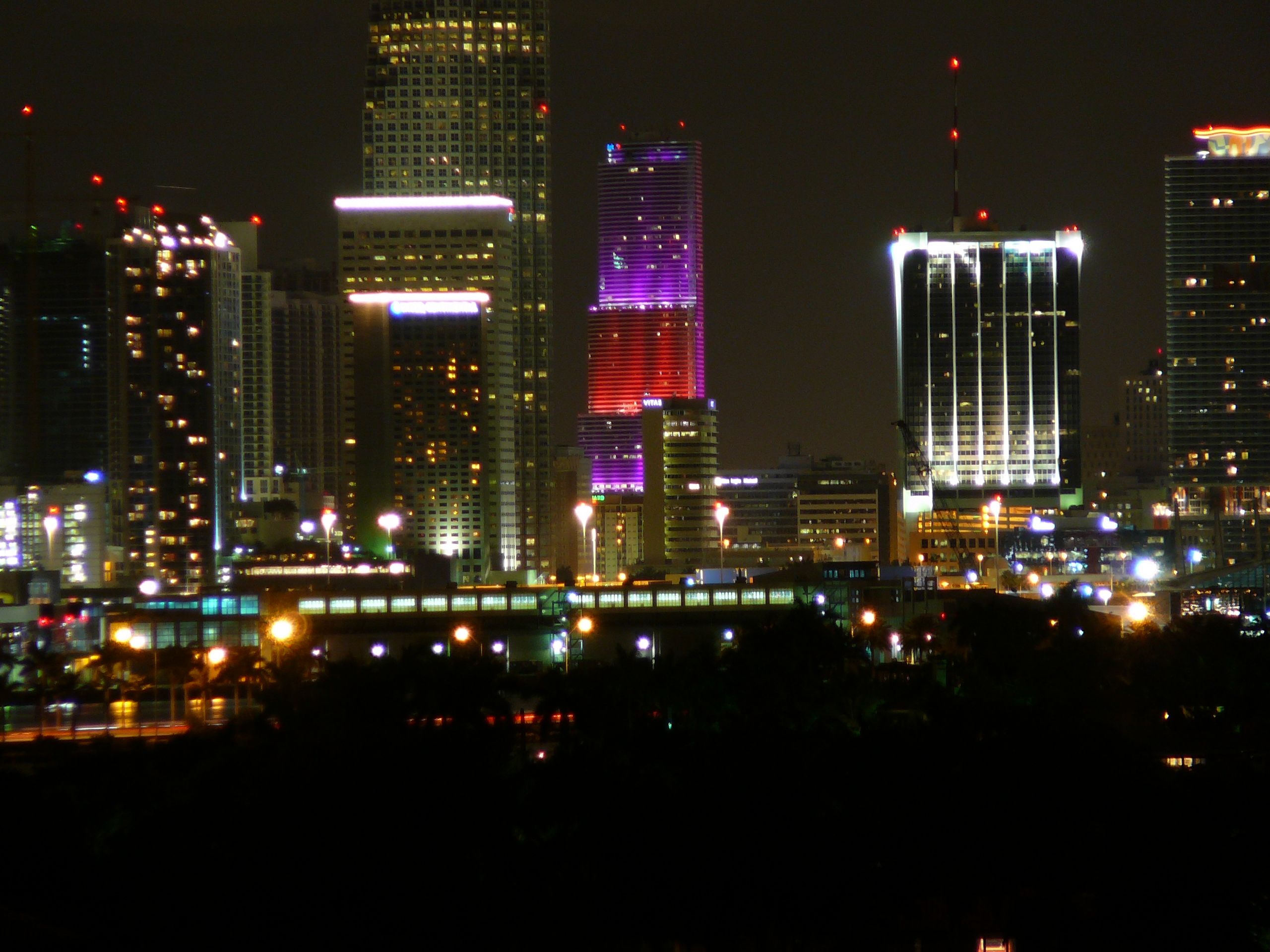
Tower lit red and purple for Valentine's Day 2008

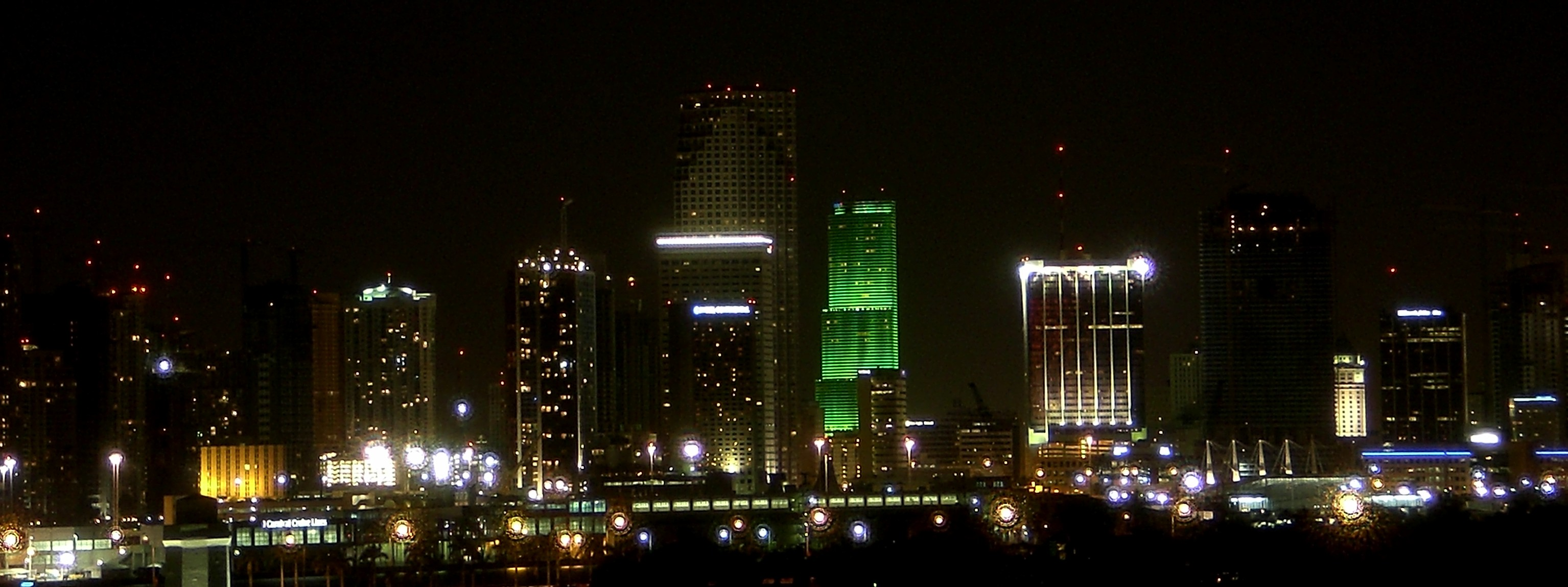
Tower lit green for Saint Patrick's Day

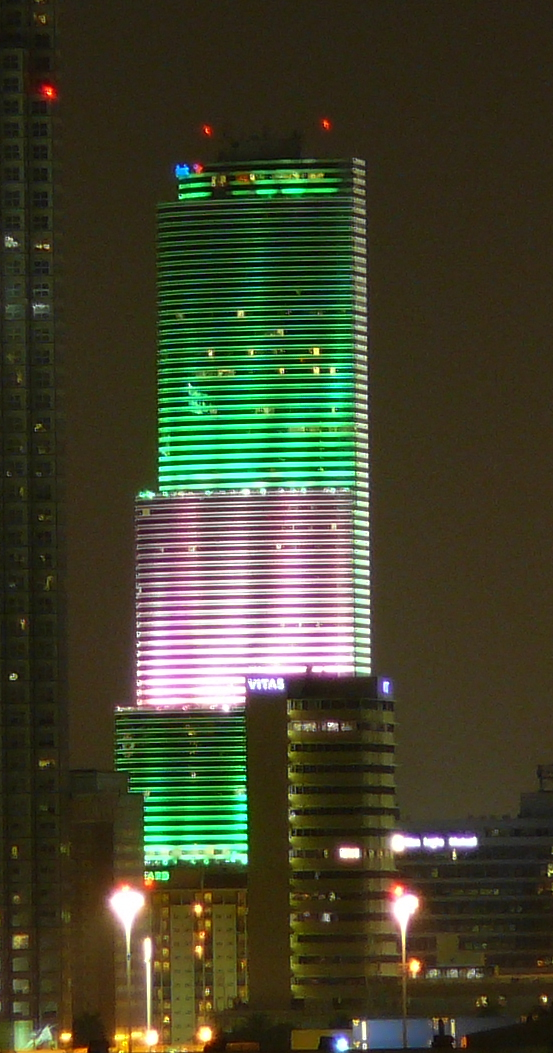
Tower lit green and pink for Easter

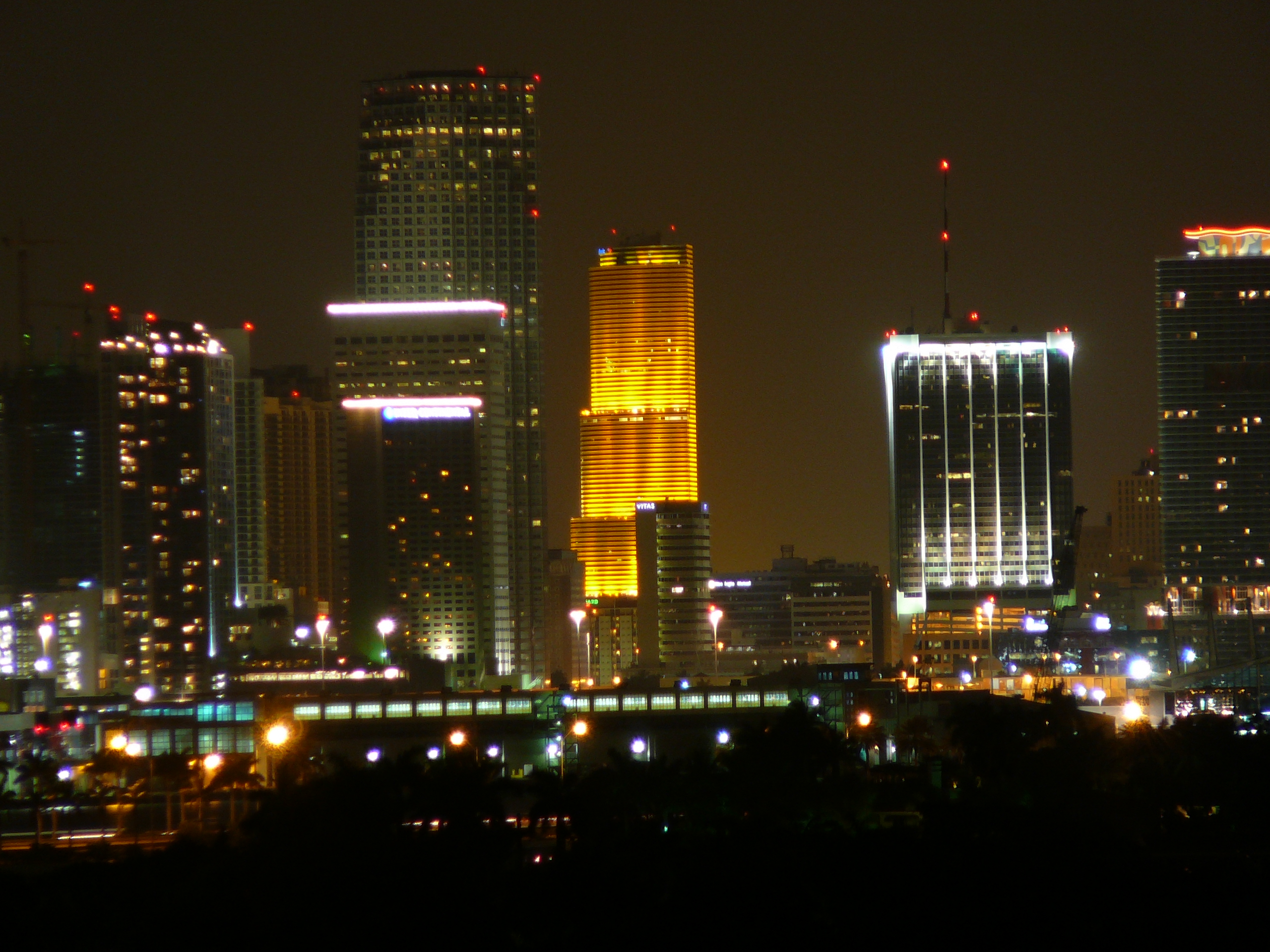
Tower lit yellow on several nights of the year

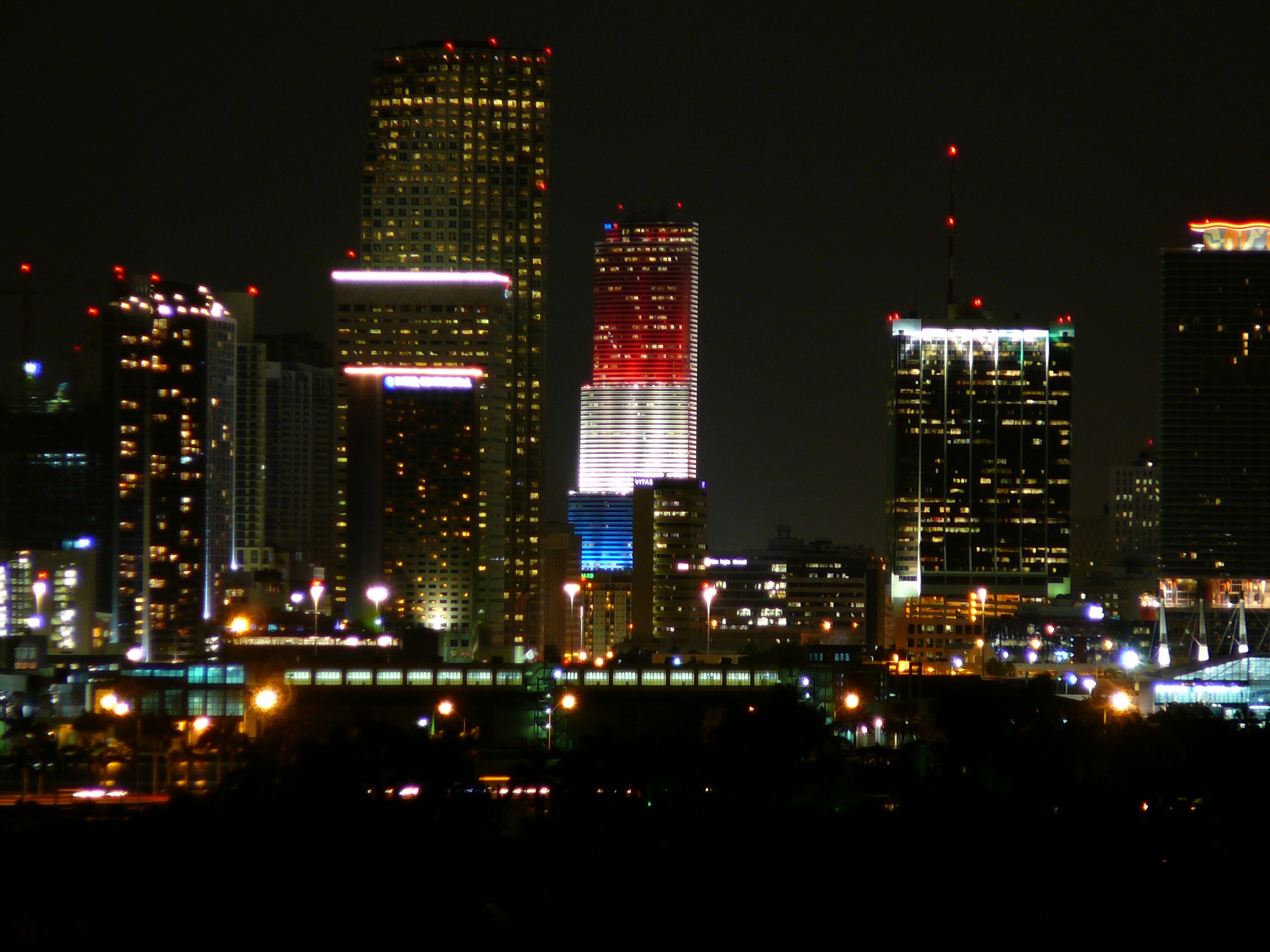
Tower lit as American flag for American Independence Day, President's Day & Veterans Day

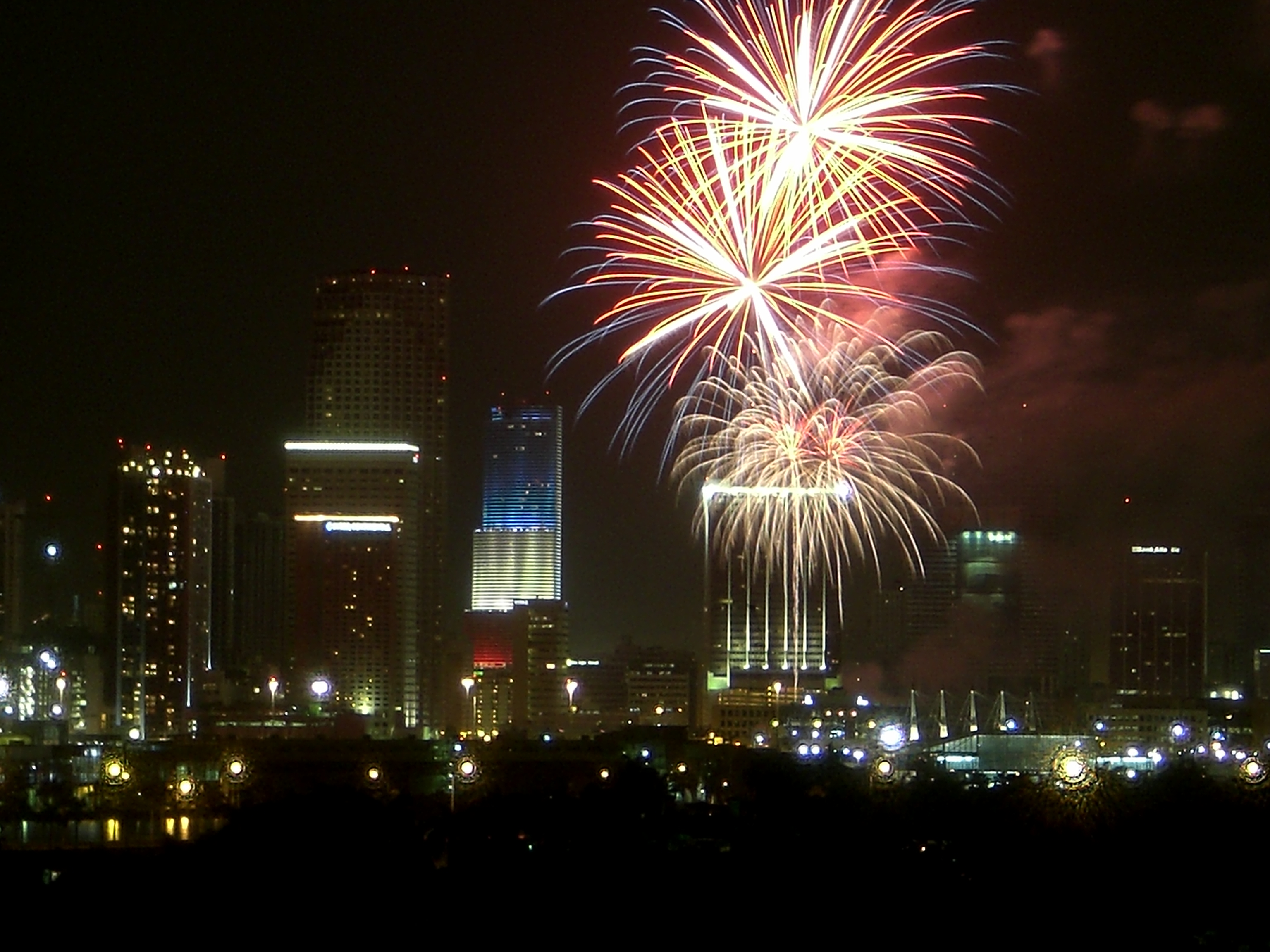
Tower lit as American flag on 4th of July, showing fireworks in foreground

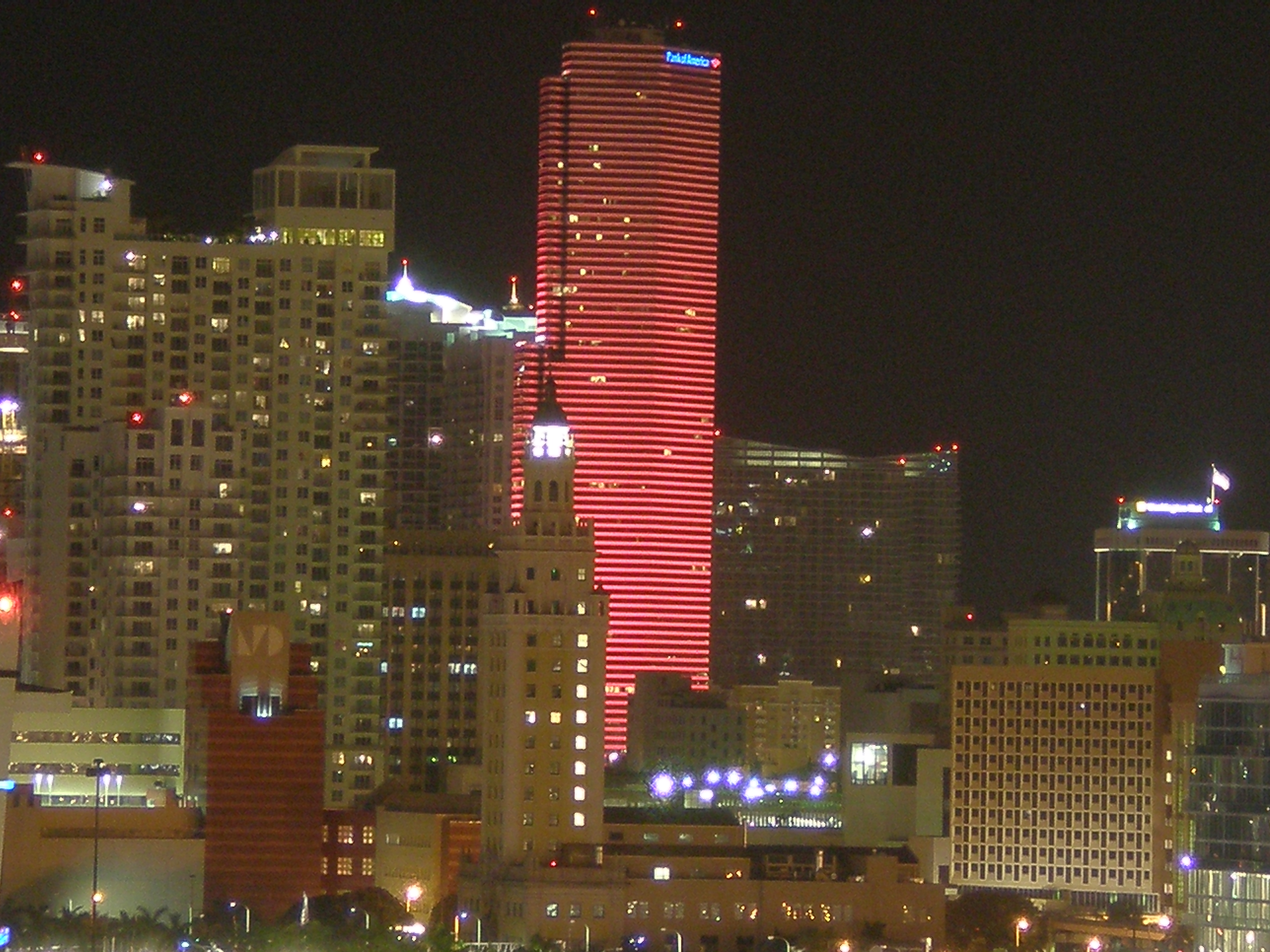
Tower lit red for National Day of Remembrance for Murder Victims 9/25/2008

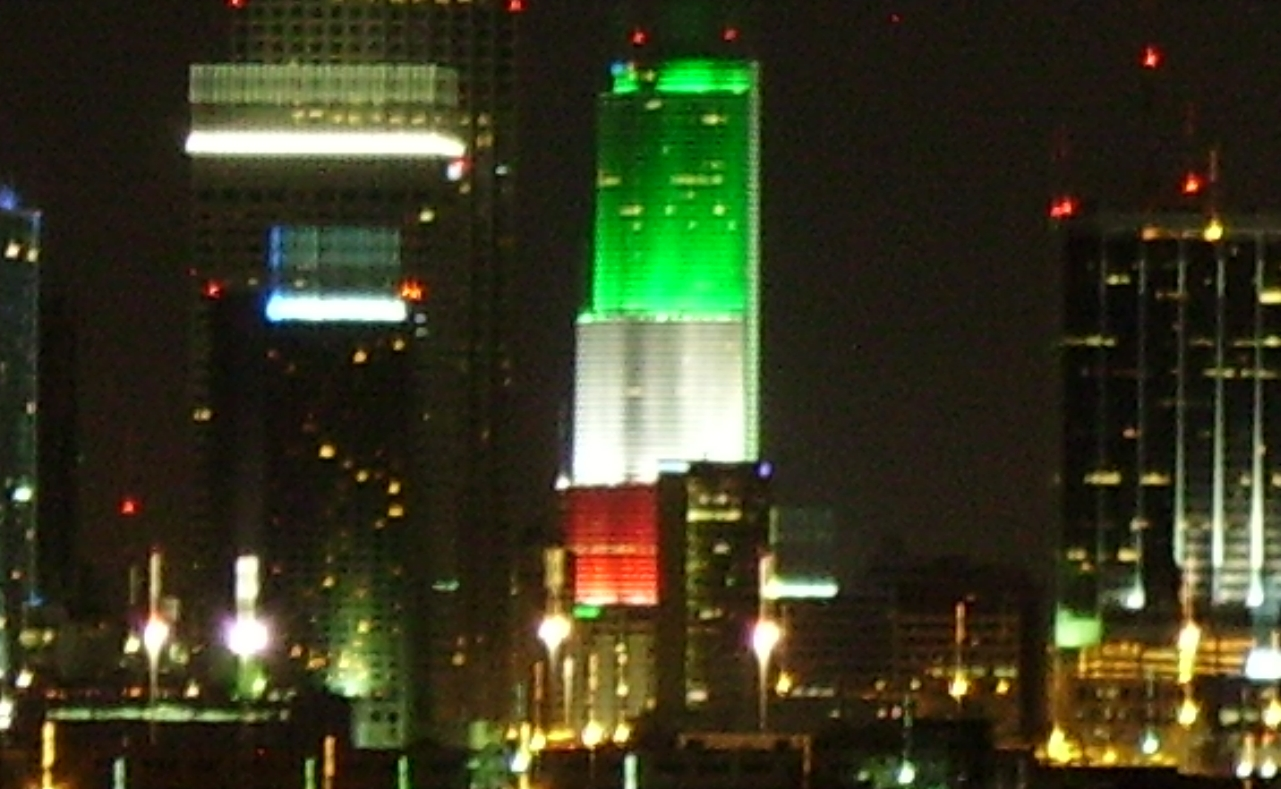
Tower lit as Italian flag for Columbus Day

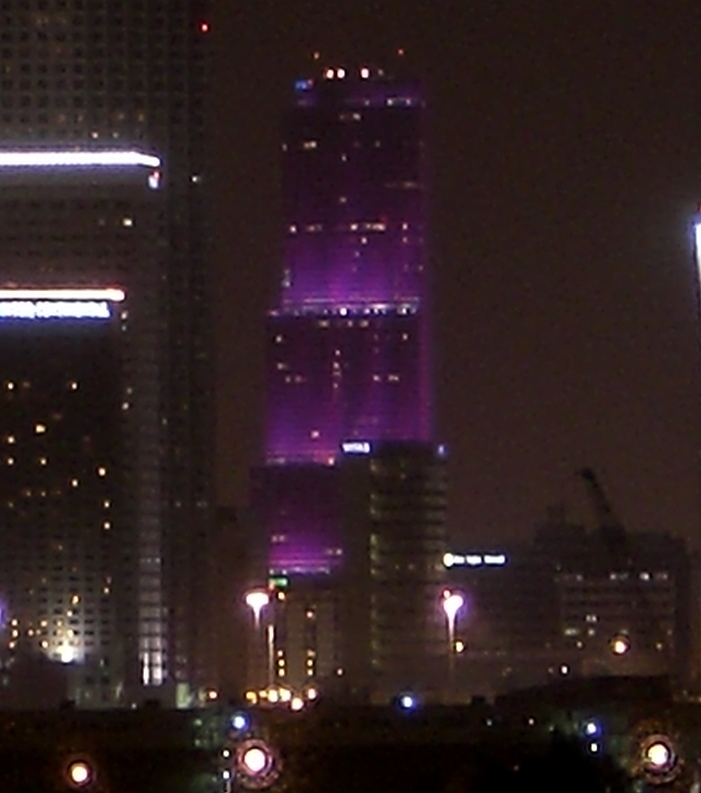
Tower lit purple for Halloween

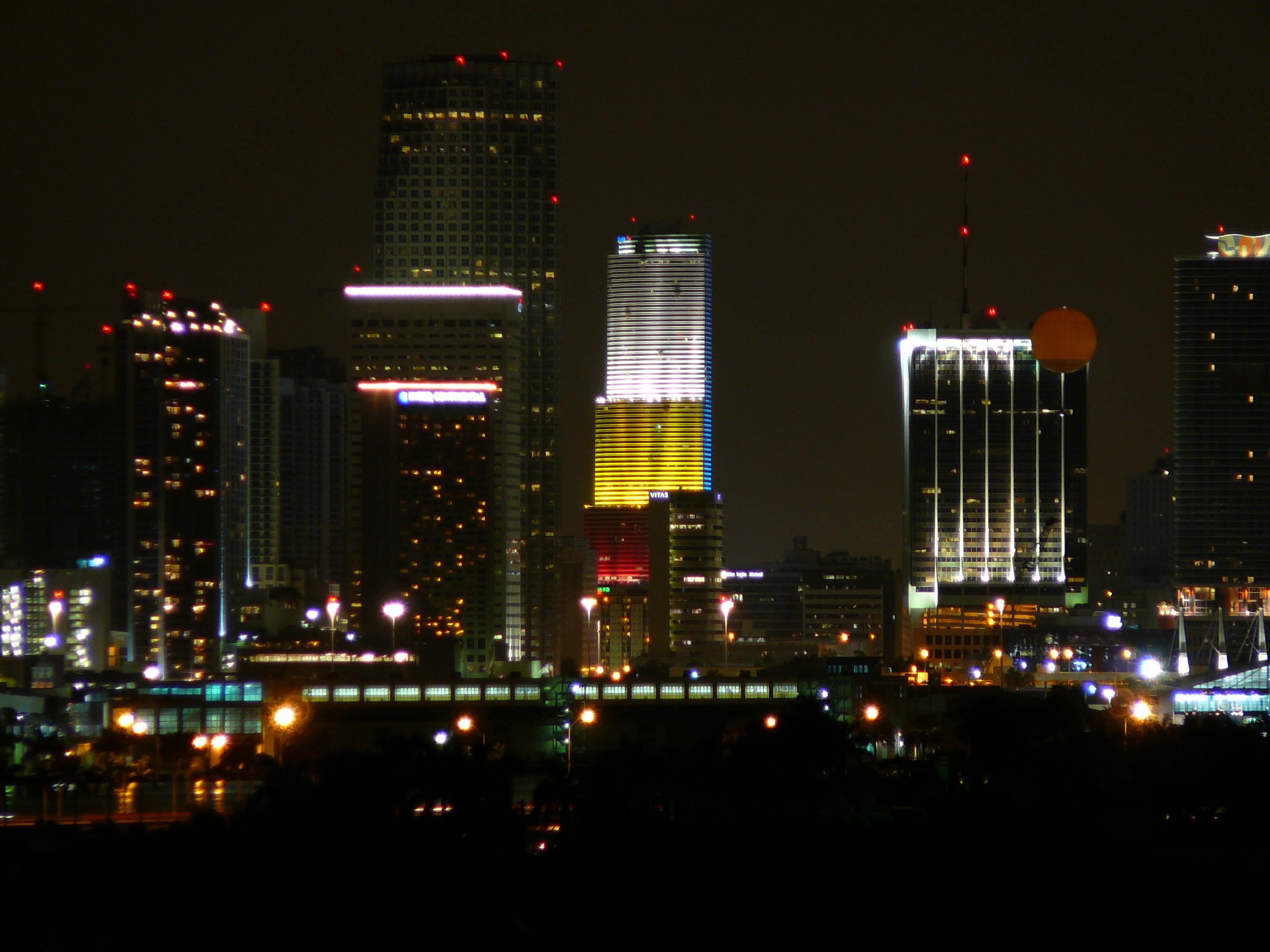
Tower lit for Thanksgiving Day

== In popular culture ==
The Miami Tower is referenced in several video games and TV shows. It was featured in the opening sequence of the 1980s TV show Miami Vice, even being referred to as the "'Miami Vice' Tower" when it was sold. It is also depicted in the video games Grand Theft Auto: Vice City in the downtown area and in Driver (video game) and DRIV3R with its name is changed to "The Tower At International Place". The tower appears repeatedly in multiple scenes throughout the movie Miami Vice as well as in the Miami Vice television series and also in a scene in the 2006 version of Casino Royale.

- In the FOX television series Fringe, this building is referred to as the "Boston Federal Building".

== See also ==
- List of tallest buildings in Miami
