= Mel Sembler =

American diplomat (1930–2023)

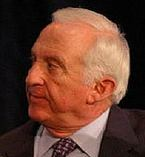

United States Ambassador to Italy
- In office December 10, 2001 – July 26, 2005
- President: George W. Bush
- Preceded by: Thomas M. Foglietta
- Succeeded by: Ronald P. Spogli

18th United States Ambassador to Australia
- In office October 10, 1989 – February 28, 1993
- President: George H. W. Bush
- Preceded by: Laurence W. Lane
- Succeeded by: Edward J. Perkins

Personal details
- Born: Melvin Floyd Sembler; May 10, 1930 St. Joseph, Missouri, U.S.
- Died: October 31, 2023 (aged 93) St. Petersburg, Florida, U.S.
- Party: Republican
- Spouse: Betty Schlesinger (m. 1953; died 2022)
- Children: 3
- Education: Northwestern University
- Profession: Diplomat, businessman

Melvin Floyd Sembler (May 10, 1930 – October 31, 2023) was an American diplomat who was the United States Ambassador to Italy (2001–2005), and Ambassador to Australia and Nauru (1989–1993). He has also served as chairman of the board of the Sembler Company, which develops and manages shopping centers, and co-founder of Straight, Inc., a controversial drug-treatment center. Sembler was the chairman of the Scooter Libby Legal Defense Trust, and was a co-chair of the Florida Finance Committee for Mitt Romney.

== Early life and education ==
Sembler was born on May 10, 1930, in St. Joseph, Missouri, and earned a Bachelor of Science degree from Northwestern University in 1952. He is of Jewish descent.

== Political fund raising career ==
Sembler was a Republican fundraiser from 1979, raising a record $21.3 million at a single dinner in April 2000. During the 1988 Presidential campaign, Sembler served on the National Steering Committee and the National Finance Committee for the George H. W. Bush for president campaign. Additionally, he was finance co-chairman for the state of Florida for the George Bush for President campaign. He served on President Reagan's White House Conference for a Drug-Free America and was an advisor on drug policy to President Bush and to Florida's former governor Bob Martinez. He served as co-chairman of the Republican National Committee's Team 100 and finance co-chairman of the American Bicentennial Presidential Inaugural, and from 1993 to 1995 he was finance chairman of the Republican Party of Florida.

Sembler served as finance chairman for the Republican National Committee from 1997 to 2000, as Florida's National Committeeman to the Republican National Committee from 1994 to 2000, as honorary chairman of the Republican Jewish Coalition, as chairman of the Drug Free America Foundation, served on the boards of the Florida Governor's Mansion Foundation, and the Florida Holocaust Museum. He was a resident member of the Florida Council of 100, a business advisory council to the governor of Florida. Sembler served on the boards of the International Council of Shopping Centers, Freedom's Watch, the American Enterprise Institute, American-Australian Education Leadership Foundation, George Bush Presidential Library Foundation, American Momentum Bank and the Moffitt Cancer Center.

Sembler was a supporter of the presidential candidacy of Mitt Romney and was one of the more prominent Jewish donors to the Republican party. On October 11, 2011, Republican presidential hopeful Mitt Romney announced that he had appointed Sembler to his Florida Finance Team.

Sembler was a vocal opponent of medical marijuana. On 26 April 2016, he pledged to begin a fundraising drive to defeat the proposed constitutional amendment in Florida that would legalize medical marijuana. Orlando attorney and major Democratic donor John Morgan challenged Sembler through Twitter to match his own $7 million contribution in support of the amendment, calling Sembler "Mel the Moocher."

== Financial career ==
Sembler served on the Board of Directors of several banks, including the First Bank of Treasure Island, the National Bank, First Union Bank, and on the Board of Directors of American Momentum Bank. He founded the Sembler Company, a shopping center development and management firm, and served as the spokesman for the shopping career industry as the 1986-1987 President of the International Council of Shopping Centers, where he served for 25 years.

The Sembler Company came to the attention of federal investigators in 2008 after a planned shopping center in Boynton Beach, Florida, that had previously been denied a zoning variance, was suddenly approved after a payment of $100,000 had been made to lobbyist Hugo Unruh. Unruh's name had previously "popped up" in a corruption investigation that led to the conviction of two Palm Beach county commissioners in 2006.

== Diplomatic career ==
In February 1989, President George H. W. Bush appointed Sembler United States Ambassador to Australia and Nauru, where he served for three and a half years. On August 23, 1989, cartoonist Garry Trudeau published a Doonesbury comic strip which seemed to imply that Sembler had purchased the ambassadorship. It has been pointed out that Sembler had no previous diplomatic experience and had donated $100,000 to the presidential campaign of George H. W. Bush shortly before his appointment. During his tenure as ambassador, however, his performance "won favorable reviews and quieted his critics". At the recommendation of the Governor-General of Australia and with the approval of Queen Elizabeth II, Sembler was named an Honorary Officer of the Order of Australia at an investiture ceremony in October 2000, recognising achievement or meritorious service to Australia or humanity at large.

Sembler was appointed U.S. Ambassador to Italy by President George W. Bush, being sworn in on 16 November 2001. In February 2005 Sembler had an annex to the U.S. Embassy in Rome named after him (the Mel Sembler Building), an honour never before bestowed on a sitting diplomat, and made possible due to an amendment by Congressman Bill Young to an appropriations bill. President George W. Bush appointed Sembler to serve on the Honorary Delegation to accompany him to Jerusalem for the celebration of the 60th anniversary of the State of Israel in May 2008. He received the America Award from the Italy-USA Foundation in 2014.

== Straight, Incorporated ==
In 1976, Sembler and his wife, Betty, founded Straight, Incorporated, an adolescent drug treatment program which has treated more than 12,000 young people who were labeled as addicts. The group now operates as the Drug Free America Foundation.

In May 1983, Straight, Inc was convicted of false imprisonment after being sued by then 20-year-old Fred Collins Jr., who alleged he had been held captive by the program against his will. The program was ordered to pay $40,000 in compensatory and $180,000 in punitive damages. In 1990, a jury awarded Karen Norton $721,000 in damages due to mistreatment by Straight. In 1982, while a patient in Straight's Florida facility, Norton alleged that staff members assaulted her, and denied her health care.

It has been suggested that licensing for Straight's Florida-based programs had been renewed under pressure from Sembler on state senators. Sembler's Drug Free America Foundation continues to campaign for hard-line drug policy. Former Governor Jeb Bush of Florida, the brother of President George W. Bush, former Drug Enforcement Administration Administrator Karen Tandy, and Congressman Dan Lungren of California are on the advisory board.

== Personal life and death ==
Sembler and his wife Betty (née Schlesinger) were married in 1953. They had three sons, Steve, Brent, and Greg plus eleven grandchildren. Betty died on February 16, 2022. Mel died on October 31, 2023, at the age of 93.

Diplomatic posts
Preceded by Laurence W. Lane	United States Ambassador to Australia; 1989–1993	Succeeded by Edward J. Perkins
Preceded by Thomas M. Foglietta	United States Ambassador to Italy; 2001–2005	Succeeded by Ronald P. Spogli
