= Caspersen =

Caspersen is a surname. Notable people with the surname include:

- Andrew Caspersen, American financier
- Erlend Caspersen (born 1982), Norwegian bassist
- Finn M. W. Caspersen (1941–2009), American financier and philanthropist
- Gunnar Caspersen (1932–2000), Norwegian trade unionist
- Maiken Caspersen Falla (born 1990), Norwegian skier
- Sven Caspersen (born 1935), Danish economist and university rector

== See also ==
- Hans Caspersen House (disambiguation)
- Caspersen School
- Casparsson
- Casper (disambiguation)
- Kasper Sonne
