= James Costos =

American diplomat (born 1963)

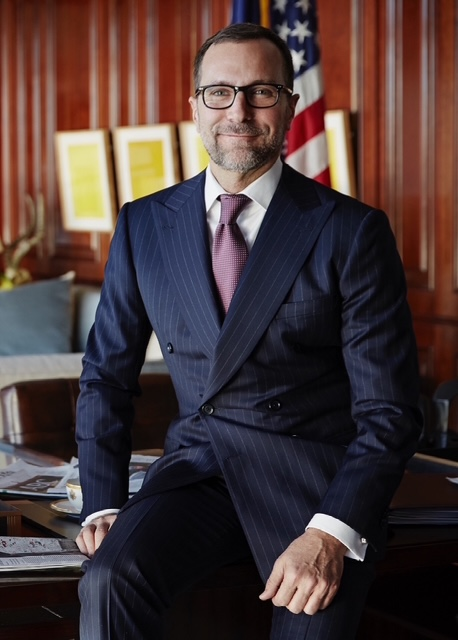

66th United States Ambassador to Spain 4th United States Ambassador to Andorra
- In office September 24, 2013 – January 18, 2017
- President: Barack Obama
- Preceded by: Alan Solomont
- Succeeded by: Duke Buchan

Personal details
- Born: 1963 (age 62–63) Lowell, Massachusetts, U.S.
- Party: Democratic
- Domestic partner: Michael Smith
- Education: University of Massachusetts Lowell
- Occupation: President Secuoya Studios

James Costos (born 1963) is an American diplomat who was the United States Ambassador to Spain and Andorra from 2013 to 2017. He was appointed by President Barack Obama and confirmed by the United States Senate on August 1, 2013.

Outside of his diplomatic work, Costos was an executive for HBO, and is the president of film production company Secuoya Studios. He was appointed as a member of the board of directors of, PJT Partners, in February 2017 shortly after completing his term as U.S. Ambassador to the Kingdom of Spain and the Principality of Andorra in January 2017, and the American LGBTQ advocacy group, Human Rights Campaign, in October 2021.

== Early life ==
Costos was born in 1963 and grew up in Lowell, Massachusetts. He is a second-generation Greek-American, whose father served as a U.S. Marine and was stationed at Camp David during the Truman administration. He is the first in his family to graduate from college. He earned a degree in political science from the University of Massachusetts Lowell in 1985.

== Career ==
Costos was a corporate leader and executive in the international retail and international entertainment industries, most notably at HBO and Tod's. He is an active supporter of humanitarian and cultural organizations, including the Human Rights Campaign and the Hispanic Society of America

President Obama nominated Costos for the position of U.S. Ambassador to Spain and Principality of Andorra on June 14, 2013. The U.S. Senate voted to confirm the nomination on August 1, 2013, and Costos was sworn in on August 22, 2013. He presented his credentials to the Spanish government in Madrid on September 24, 2013. He presented his credentials to the Co-Princes of Andorra in La Seu d'Urgell on April 4, 2014, and in Paris on July 23, 2014.

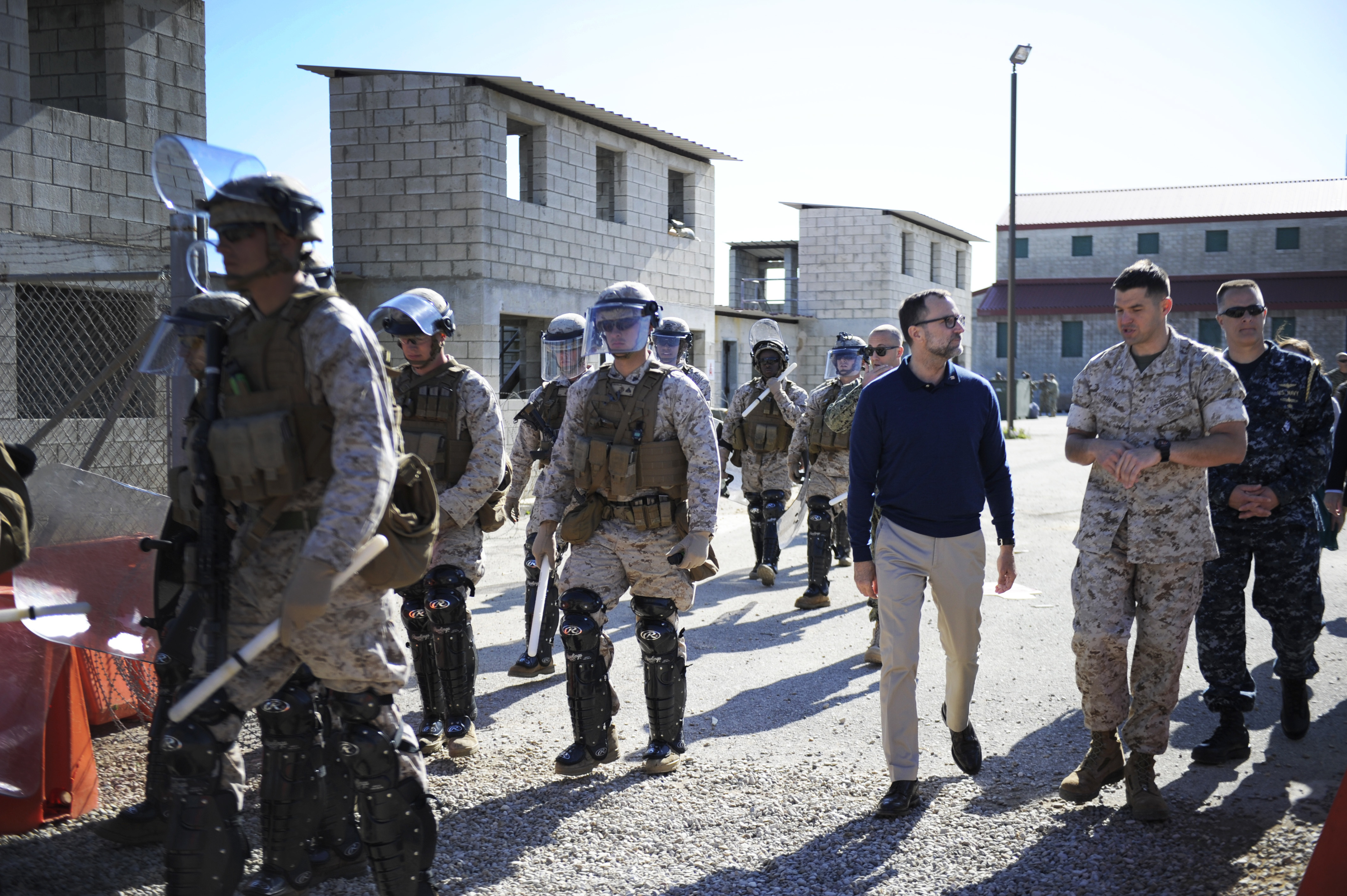
Costos visits Rota

His business career has made him an expert on the issue of the enforcement of laws against digital piracy, a particular concern of U.S. businesses with respect to Spain. His initial focus, he said, was on issues of international security and thanking Spain for allowing the U.S. to deploy part of its anti-missile shield defense and for hosting U.S. military bases. In September 2013, Costos visited the bases at Rota and Morón to mark the 60th anniversary of the agreement under which they were established.

In July 2016, President Obama was the first sitting president to visit Spain in 15 years. Costos accompanied President Obama, the first U.S. president to visit Naval Station Rota, where Costos oversaw the arrival of four U.S. Navy destroyers based there, as part of a NATO anti-missile defense shield.

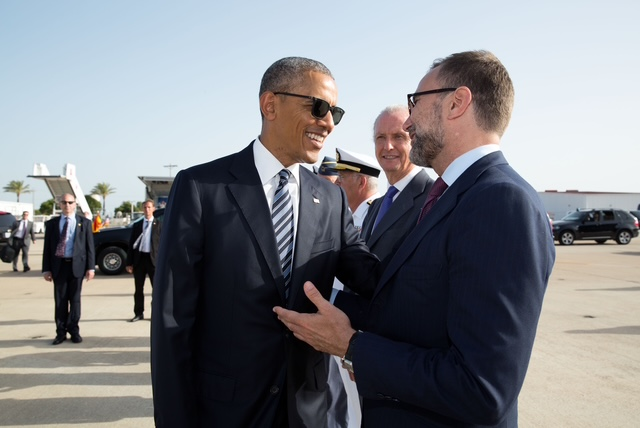
President Obama and Costos - Naval Station Rota

In his speech at Rota, President Obama said, "Spain is a strong NATO ally, we’re grateful for Spain's many decades of hosting U.S. forces, and we’re major trading partners. That's why the United States is deeply committed to maintaining our relationship with a strong, unified Spain. We need Spain's continued contributions to the campaign against ISIL, to counter-terrorism efforts that prevent attacks, and to NATO efforts that enhance our defense and deterrence posture. We need a growing Spanish economy to help sustain trade, growth in the EU, and entrepreneurship so that globalization is creating jobs and opportunity for all people, not just a few at the top.”

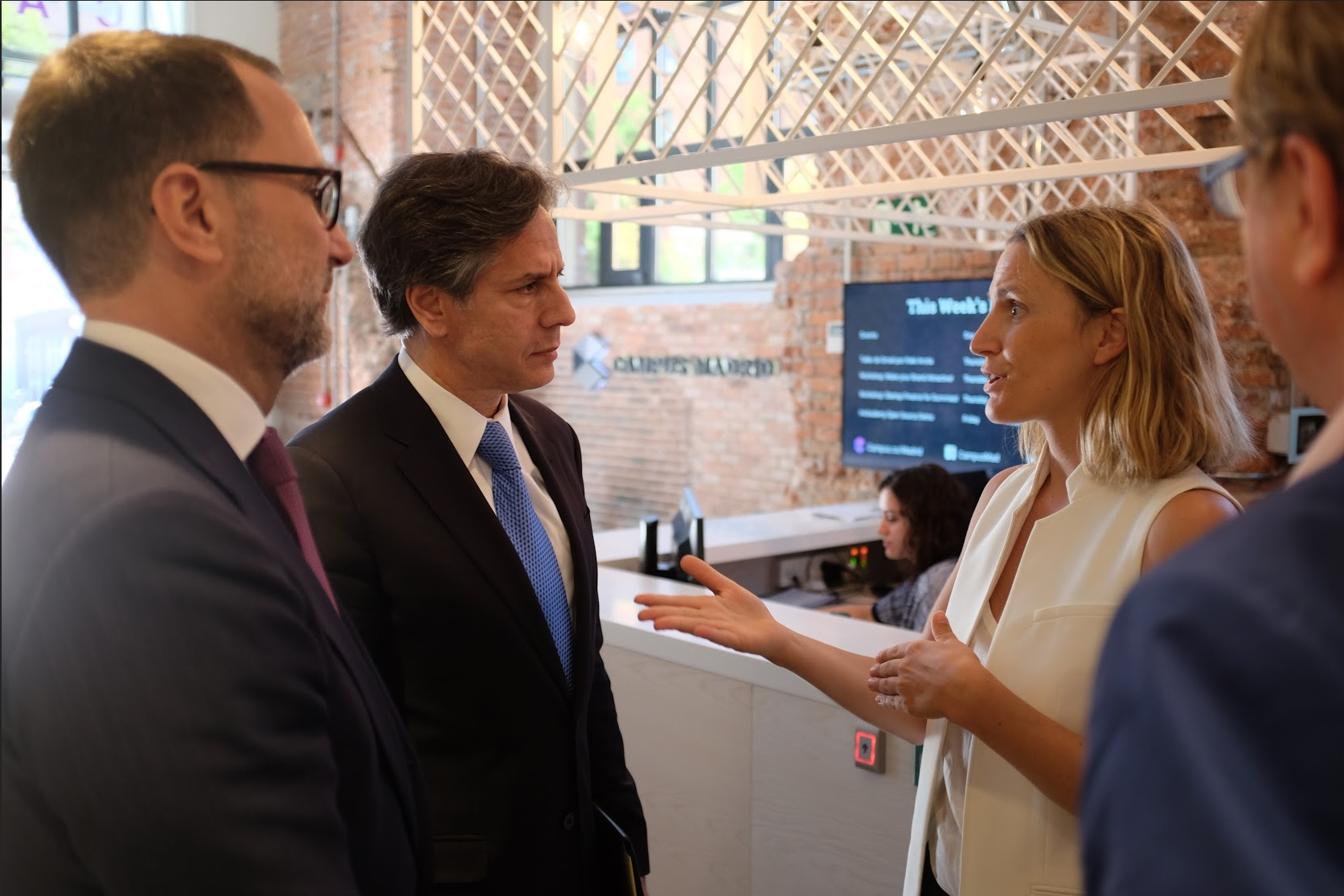
Deputy Secretary of State Antony "Tony" Blinken, with U.S. Ambassador to the Kingdom of Spain and the Principality of Andorra James Costos, visits Campus Madrid, Google's space for entrepreneurs, in Madrid, Spain, on July 27, 2015.

Building on the policy objectives of President Obama to promote global entrepreneurship, Costos created and launched an event called InCubed (IN3) in June 2015, where innovators, investors and institutions would meet to network and exchange ideas. “You said you wanted access to Silicon Valley,” Costos told them. “Well, I have brought Silicon Valley to you."

In October 2013 the Spanish government summoned him to address allegations that the National Security Agency had recently collected data on 60 million telephone calls in Spain.

While visiting California in 2014, President Obama and his wife Michelle stayed at the Costos-Smith home.

In June 2015, he joined other gay U.S. ambassadors in a statement supporting international trade agreements, linking open markets to the development of open societies that provide civil rights protections.

In February 2017, Costos joined the board of directors of PJT Partners, an advisory-focused investment bank. Paul J. Taubman is the chairman and CEO of PJT Partners. Taubman founded PJT Partners in early 2013 and, in October 2014, announced the intention to merge into the spun-off Blackstone advisory businesses.

In April 2020, during the COVID-19 pandemic, Spain's Secuoya Content Group, owner of Madrid Content City studios used by Netflix for its first European Production Hub, named Ambassador Costos, former HBO Executive, as president of Secuoya Studios, its TV fiction-film content production arm.

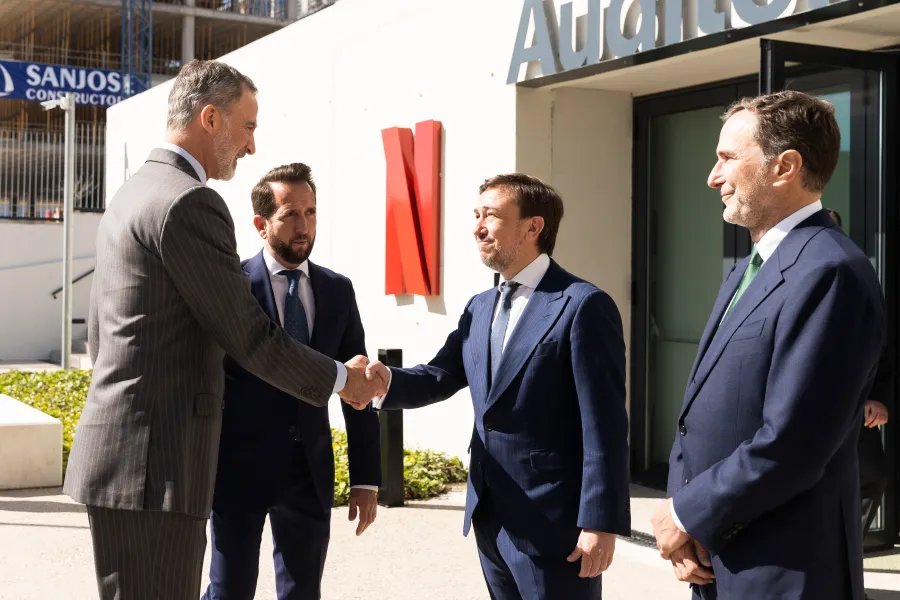
Greeting King Felipe of Spain at Madrid Content City, are Raul Berdones, Pablo Jimeno and Ambassador Costos

In 2023, Deadline reported that Secuoya Studios appointed Costos because his background in the entertainment industry and close ties to Spain positioned him to strengthen collaboration between the Spanish and U.S. audiovisual sectors. Following his diplomatic service, the Spanish Film Commission named him an honorary ambassador in recognition of his role in connecting Spanish and American companies. Deadline also quoted Netflix Co-CEO Ted Sarandos, who praised Costos and Secuoya Studios for operating “a world-class production facility that hosts some of the biggest Netflix productions including* Élite*, Kaos, Berlin, and Society of the Snow.”

Costos was appointed in October 2020, to the board of directors of Grifols S.A., a Spanish global biotherapeutics company listed on the IBEX 35. Grifols employs 24,000 people and had revenues of 5.1 billion euros in 2019, which grew by 13.6%, while net profit increased by 4.8% to 625 million euros.

Grifols began Phase 3 clinical trials in patients with COVID-19 with its therapeutic manufactured in Clayton, North Carolina. Grifols is manufacturing the experimental therapy from the plasma of healthy, recovered COVID-19 patients, and was the first to deploy a large-scale collection of this plasma, as well as the first to manufacture and deliver the clinical anti-SARS-CoV-2 hyperimmune globulin.

Costos resigned his position from the Grifols Board of Directors, with his resignation becoming effective in May 2024, citing that his term was naturally expiring and that his other commitments wouldn't allow him to devote the necessary time to carry out his entrusted task as director.

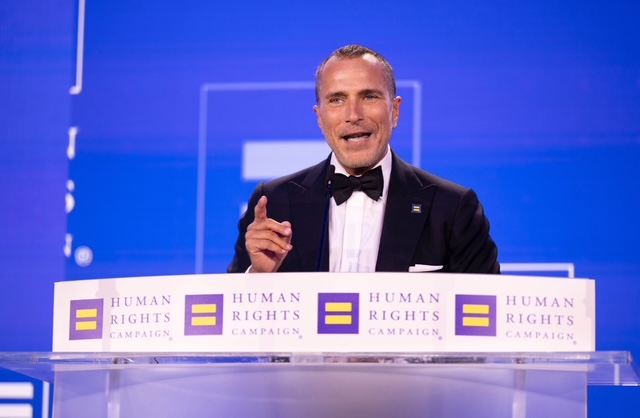
James Costos at Human Rights Campaign National Dinner September 2025

In October 2021, Costos was appointed to the Human Rights Campaign Board of Directors and the HRC Foundation board of directors. When Costos was appointed U.S. Ambassador in 2013, the Human Rights Campaign said "Costos is a true citizen of the world, he has incredible global business experience and is a respected and innovative leader. He has solid business and political relationships at the highest levels and a proven commitment to community, philanthropy, human rights, and democracy that make him an outstanding choice to be the nation's next Ambassador to Spain.”

President Biden, in June 2022, appointed Costos to the J. William Fulbright Foreign Scholarship Board, an “educational and cultural exchange” network that connects students and professionals to international graduate and study programs. Costos said, “It's a great privilege to continue the work I did when I was at the embassy, I always wanted to spend a lot of my time with the next generation of folks who are coming up behind us, because they will be our future leaders, and we have to invest our time and our resources in them."

Costos resigned from the Fulbright Scholarship Board in June 2025, along with 10 other members, due to alleged political interference by the Trump administration in the Fulbright Program's selection process, which was designed to be impartial and protected by the board. The board stated their resignations were to avoid legitimizing actions that they believed compromised the program's integrity and the mission established by Congress, according to The New York Times. Costos stated his resignation was not a protest, but a defense of principle and the legacy of Senator J. William Fulbright.

== Ambassadorship ==
James Costos served as the United States Ambassador to Spain and Andorra from September 24, 2013, to January 18, 2017, during the administration of President Barack Obama. His tenure focused on strengthening transatlantic relations through innovation, entrepreneurship, cultural diplomacy, defense cooperation, trade, tourism and the advancement of LGBTQ+ rights.

=== Economic, Trade and Audiovisual Cooperation ===
Costos prioritized expanding bilateral trade and investment between the United States, Spain and Andorra, emphasizing economic development, entrepreneurship, innovation, renewable energy and the creative industries. During his ambassadorship, U.S. exports to Spain increased, while Spain became one of the top European investors in the United States, particularly in infrastructure, energy and manufacturing.

He collaborated closely with the Spanish Institute for Foreign Trade (ICEX), the Spanish Confederation of Business Organizations (CEOE), AmCham Spain and U.S. agencies such as the Department of Commerce, The U.S Small Business Association and SelectUSA to promote bilateral business partnerships. His leadership in the creation of the IN³ Summit, an Innovation, Investment and Impact Initiative which connected Spanish entrepreneurs with U.S. investors and technology leaders, and together with then Google CEO Eric Schmidt, Costos helped bring the fourth Google Campus (Google for Startups) in the world to Madrid, cementing Spain's place on the global tech innovation map as a regional hub for startup activity.

A major focus of his diplomacy was the promotion of Spain's audiovisual and entertainment sector as a destination for U.S. investment and production. Drawing on his earlier career at HBO, Costos introduced Hollywood executives to Spain's growing film and television industry. He hosted delegations of industry leaders—including Ted Sarandos (Netflix), Richard Plepler (HBO), and Ron Meyer (NBCUniversal) and facilitated meetings with Spanish officials, producers, and film commissions to encourage co-productions and filming in Spain. These efforts contributed to a rise in U.S. productions filmed in Spain, including Game of Thrones, Terminator: Dark Fate, and Allied. Following his diplomatic service, Costos continued advancing these collaborations as President of Secuoya Studios, fostering international co-production and investment in Spain's growing audiovisual economy.

=== Promotion of Tourism and Transatlantic Connectivity ===
Costos also championed tourism promotion as a pillar of economic diplomacy, working to increase travel between Spain and the United States through expanded air routes, joint marketing and public diplomacy efforts. He collaborated with Turespaña, Brand USA, and major carriers such as American Airlines and Iberia to grow transatlantic flight connections linking U.S. cities with Madrid, Barcelona, Málaga and eventually Mallorca.

Through media appearances and embassy-led initiatives, Costos promoted Spain to American travelers as a destination for culture, gastronomy, design, and heritage. Condé Nast Traveler profiled him as “a modern ambassador redefining Spain's global image,” highlighting his advocacy for cultural exchange between both the U.S and Spain, and the importance of sustainable travel. Architectural Digest also showcased the ambassador's residence in Madrid—redesigned with his partner Michael S. Smith, as “a reflection of Spain's artistic and cultural vitality,” emphasizing its use as a venue for hosting tourism, cultural and investment events.

During his tenure, Spain recorded record high U.S. visitor numbers in 2015–2016, the strongest since before the global financial crisis, with American Airlines, Delta, and United Air Lines all expanding direct services to the country. Industry observers credited these gains to coordinated embassy outreach, Costos's engagement with travel and hospitality leaders, and Spain's growing reputation as a safe and creative European destination.

=== Defense and NATO Cooperation ===
Costos oversaw a period of significant deepening in U.S.–Spain defense cooperation and Spain's integration within the North Atlantic Treaty Organization (NATO) framework. During his ambassadorship, Naval Station Rota in Cádiz became a cornerstone of NATO's Ballistic Missile Defense (BMD) system in Europe. Between 2014 and 2015, four U.S. Navy Aegis destroyers—USS Donald Cook (DDG-75), USS Ross (DDG-71), USS Porter (DDG-78), and USS Carney (DDG-64) were homeported at Rota, representing one of the most important U.S. military deployments in Spain in decades.

In 2015, Costos helped finalize an amendment to the U.S.–Spain Defense Cooperation Agreement allowing a permanent U.S. Marine Corps crisis-response force to be stationed at Morón Air Base, supporting operations across Africa, the Mediterranean, and the Middle East. This agreement transformed Morón into the permanent headquarters of the U.S. Africa Command's Special-Purpose Marine Air-Ground Task Force (SP-MAGTF), reinforcing Spain's strategic importance to transatlantic security.

He accompanied President Barack Obama during the 2016 presidential visit to Spain, which included meetings with King Felipe VI, Acting Prime Minister Mariano Rajoy, and U.S. service members at Rota. The visit reaffirmed bilateral defense commitments and highlighted Spain's participation in NATO operations in the Baltic, the Mediterranean, and the Middle East.

Under Costos's tenure, cooperation also expanded in counter-terrorism, cyber-security, and intelligence sharing, identified by both governments as priorities following terrorist attacks in Europe in 2015–2016.

=== Cultural Diplomacy and Human Rights ===
A strong proponent of cultural diplomacy, Costos and his partner Michael S. Smith expanded the Art in Embassies program at the ambassador's residence in Madrid, curating one of the most extensive contemporary art installations ever presented in a U.S. embassy and opening it to the public.

Costos was also a visible advocate for LGBTQ+ rights, hosting embassy events marking the 2015 U.S. Supreme Court marriage-equality ruling and supporting Spain's role in the U.N. “Free & Equal” campaign.

== Political Positions ==
Costos characterized President Trump's handling of COVID-19 as a complete failure, "my country failed the world in this effort by not being adequately prepared for the pandemic and by recklessly refusing to take the lead on a coordinated global response." He insists that "competent leadership and a firm reliance on science is required to take the necessary actions to save our planet for future generations to come. Science and research are not fake news."

Costos explained, "We must work to restore trust in our leadership and join together to solve our world problems. Electing former Vice-President Joe Biden to the White House in November is the fundamental first step Americans should take to heal the soul and spirit of our nation, with the concomitant goal of immediately refocusing our nation's global agenda."

== Personal life ==
Costos lives in Los Angeles, California, with his partner Michael S. Smith, the official interior designer for the Obama White House. He is a vegetarian but imposed no dietary restrictions on embassy functions. On the subject of LGBT rights, Costos has said "I am not an activist. I broadly support human rights for straight, gay, women's issues. And I just happen to be gay... This doesn't define me as a person, but it is part of who I am. It's like being a vegetarian: it's one more facet of James Costos." He said he and Smith had been welcomed in Spain "with great accommodation" and that because Spain already provides LGBT civil rights, the role he and Smith played was symbolic for those who still suffered from a lack of enforcement in support of their rights: "What we can do through our messaging is give a sense of hope."

After leaving the White House in January 2017, the Obamas departed Washington for Palm Springs, where they were guests in the Costos-Smith home for several days before traveling to the British Virgin Islands to stay at the home of Sir Richard Branson.

== See also ==
- List of LGBT ambassadors of the United States

Diplomatic posts
Preceded by Alan Solomont	United States Ambassador to Spain; 2013–2017	Succeeded by Duke Buchan
Preceded by Alan Solomont	United States Ambassador to Andorra; 2014–2017	Succeeded by Duke Buchan
