= Andrew Caspersen =

American fraudster

Andrew W.W. Caspersen is an American financier and formerly a partner and managing director at PJT Partners Inc.'s Park Hill Group.

In March 2016, Caspersen was charged by federal prosecutors with securities fraud and wire fraud. The government alleged that Caspersen engaged in a $95 million fraud scheme, including over $20 million actually received, and the rest in solicited investments. In June 2016, the government filed additional charges, alleging a larger scheme in which Caspersen actually received $63 million, including money from family and friends. The government alleges that Caspersen lost $108 million in stock or options trading between February 11 and March 9, 2016.

On July 6, 2016 Caspersen pleaded guilty to fraud involving $38 million, one count of securities fraud and one count of wire fraud, as part of a plea agreement. Caspersen agreed with prosecutors to a sentence of 12 to 16 years in prison, but Judge Jed S. Rakoff, who has been a critic of Federal sentencing guidelines, departed downward from the plea agreement and sentenced Caspersen to only four years in prison. Caspersen was Federal inmate #75827-054 and was held in USP Lewisburg in Pennsylvania; he was released on 26 June 2019.

Caspersen was 39 years old when he was sentenced in 2016.

== Early life, family, and education ==
Andrew Caspersen is the son of multimillionaire financier Finn M. W. Caspersen, former chairman of Beneficial Corporation. The elder Caspersen died of a self-inflicted gunshot wound in 2009 after the opening of a federal tax-evasion investigation. The elder Caspersen was never charged with any crime, and the Internal Revenue Service completed its investigation in 2013 without imposing any penalties.

Andrew graduated from the Groton School in 1995, where he was a rower and captained the football team. He graduated from Princeton University with a degree in economics in 1999. He graduated from Harvard Law School in 2002.

== Career ==
Caspersen spent the first nine years of his career at Coller Capital. He joined the Park Hill Group in 2013. Park Hill was part of the Blackstone Group until the fall of 2015, when it became part of PJT Partners, an advisory firm (led by investment banker Paul J. Taubman) that was spun off of Blackstone. Caspersen was a partner at Park Hill and worked in its unit that advises hedge funds, private equity and secondary funds on raising capital. In 2015, he earned a salary of $3.68 million from Park Hill.

According to the Wall Street Journal, people close to Caspersen believe he was addicted to market speculation, similar to a gambling addiction. The addiction may have led Caspersen to lose the tens of millions of dollars from his inherited personal fortune and salary, as well as fraudulently obtained funds.

=== Federal criminal prosecution and parallel SEC civil action ===
On March 26, 2016, as Caspersen was returning with his family from a Florida vacation, he was arrested at LaGuardia Airport and charged by federal prosecutors with securities fraud and wire fraud. Federal prosecutors accuse Caspersen of carrying out a "$95 million fraud scheme" by fraudulently soliciting investors for funds, and then converting those funds to his own use. Prosecutors specifically allege that Caspersen obtained $25 million from a charitable foundation and without authorization wired $17.6 million of that sum to trade securities in his personal brokerage account, losing most of this money through "aggressive options trading." Prosecutors allege that Caspersen used the other $8.1 million to cover-up "an earlier unauthorized wire transfer of the same amount" that Caspersen had previously diverted for his own use. Prosecutors further allege that before his arrest, Caspersen "tried to solicit an additional $20 million from the same charitable foundation" and up to $50 million investment from another multinational private equity firm headquartered in New York, which declined. (The private equity firm is called "Firm-5" in the federal complaint against Caspersen, but the Wall Street Journal reported it to be KKR & Co. L.P.)

Two days after his arrest, Caspersen was arraigned in federal court and freed on $5 million bail. If convicted, Caspersen would face a maximum prison term of 20 years on each count.

A parallel civil action was also filed by the SEC.

The Moore Charitable Foundation—founded by hedge fund billionaire Louis Bacon to help protect water, wildlife and the environment—was the alleged victim of the scheme, losing $24.6 million. Another $400,000 was allegedly lost by an individual related to the foundation. The New York Times identified this individual as James McIntyre, who was a classmate of Caspersen's at Princeton University. A statement from the foundation said that they "detected irregularities in a proposed follow-on deal" and "swiftly notified PJT Partners' general counsel's office and cooperated with PJT in their investigation of the issue." Other victims may include Caspersen's mother and two brothers.

After Casperson's arrest, PJT released a statement saying it was "stunned and outraged" to learn about the allegation against Caspersen and that the company was cooperating with the government.

In an April 8, 2016 regulatory filing, PJT claimed that Casperson also stole $14 million from family and friends and that he began his fraudulent activities in late 2014, about a year earlier than the Federal indictment claims.

On June 14, 2016, the government filed additional charges, alleging a larger scheme. The government alleges that Caspersen actually received $63 million, including money from family and friends, and lost $108 million in stock or options trading between February 11 and March 9, 2016. Caspersen pleaded not guilty to the new charges in a court appearance, but his lawyer said in court that his client is expected to plead guilty in July 2016.

In July 2017, the Moore Charitable Foundation sued Paul J. Taubman's investment bank for fraud, claiming PJT Partners “bears responsibility for the foundation’s enormous loss” of $16 million stemming from the fraudulent actions of their employee Caspersen.

=== Guilty plea ===
On July 7, 2016, pursuant to a plea agreement with federal prosecutors, Caspersen pleaded guilty to one charge of security fraud and one charge of wire fraud. The statutory maximum sentence is twenty years, but under the plea agreement Caspersen and the government agreed on a sentencing range of between twelve and sixteen years in prison, subject to the approval of Judge Jed S. Rakoff (who described the federal sentencing guidelines as "irrational" in the court hearing in which Caspersen pleaded guilty).

In a statement at the hearing, Caspersen said: "The people I harmed were people I cared for the most. I could not be more sorry or ashamed for my crimes." It is possible that Casperson's "compulsive gambling addiction and mental illness" may be viewed as a mitigating factor in sentencing.

He has reached an agreement with the SEC which permanently bars him from the investment industry.

== Personal life ==
Caspersen is divorced from his former wife Christina, a fellow Princeton graduate who is an investor relations representative for Anheuser-Busch InBev. The couple lived in Bronxville, New York, in a home purchased in 2015, but sold the home in 2016. Caspersen has a home in New York City. He and his wife also own a co-op apartment in Manhattan.
