= Michael S. Smith (interior designer) =

American responsible for the 2010 makeover of the Oval Office

- Born: 1963 (age 62–63); Los Angeles, California, US
- Education: Otis College of Art and Design, Victoria and Albert Museum
- Occupation: Interior designer
- Partner: James Costos

Michael Sean Smith (born 1963) is an American interior designer based in Los Angeles. Smith was appointed by President Barack Obama to the Committee for the Preservation of the White House from 2008-2016 and is responsible for the 2010 makeover of the Oval Office.

== Early life ==
Michael Smith was born in 1963. He studied at the Otis College of Art and Design in Los Angeles and at the Victoria and Albert Museum in London for graduate studies.

== Career ==
Smith started his career by working with the antiques dealer Gep Durenberger and with the New York designer John Saladino. He has been running his own interior design business since 1990.

In an interview with The Washington Post, he describes his style as "updated traditional"; in fact, his work blends vintage and contemporary looks with elements such as "Georgian antiques, Uzbek suzani textiles, 18th-century Chinese wallpaper, sun-bleached Moroccan carpets and a dash of Anthropologie and Pottery Barn".

Architectural Digest included Smith among its "AD 100", its "selection of the top architects and interior designers" published in the magazine in recent years. Its editorial "profile" of Smith characterizes his style as "a blend of classic European style and American modernism". Smith was also named 2003 Designer of the Year by Elle Decor.

Smith's clients reportedly include News Corporation president Peter Chernin, Oaktree Capital chairman Howard Marks, writer Gigi Levangie Grazer, model Cindy Crawford (for whom Smith has designed two California houses and two New York apartments), film director Steven Spielberg, and actors Dustin Hoffman and Michelle Pfeiffer.

=== White House makeover ===
In 2008, Barack and Michelle Obama appointed Smith to redecorate the residential quarters of the White House. During this project, Smith worked with Michelle Obama and White House curator William Allman to select art on-loan from museums to be displayed in private quarters and elsewhere.

In February 2010, President Obama appointed him a member of the Committee for the Preservation of the White House. Smith's makeover of the Oval Office was revealed to the public in late August 2010. Dominated by shades of taupe and beige, the designer redecorated the bookcases with Native American baskets and ceramics from the National Museum of the American Indian and installed "a rug woven with quotations from Martin Luther King Jr., John F. Kennedy and others; two fawn-colored cotton-rayon sofas; two elegant midnight-blue lamps by Christopher Spitzmiller; and an extremely contemporary mica coffee table from Roman Thomas, a New York furnituremaker".

Smith has authored several books on interior design including: The Curated House: Creating Style, Beauty, and Balance, Building Beauty: The Alchemy of Design, Kitchens and Baths, Houses, and Elements of Style.

== Personal life ==
Smith lived in Madrid, Spain, with his partner James Costos, who served as United States Ambassador to Spain. Smith and Costos currently reside in the Bel Air neighborhood of Los Angeles and in Palm Springs, California.

== Publications ==
- Michael S. Smith: Elements of Style (with Diane Dorrans Saeks). New York: Rizzoli, c2004. ISBN 0-8478-2762-3
- Michael S. Smith: Houses (with Christine Pittel). New York: Rizzoli, 2008. ISBN 978-0-8478-3070-1
