= PJT =

PJT may refer to:

- PJT Partners, the NYSE code PJT
- pjt, the ISO 639-3 for Pitjantjatjara dialect, a dialect of the Western Desert language
