= Alan Solomont =

American diplomat

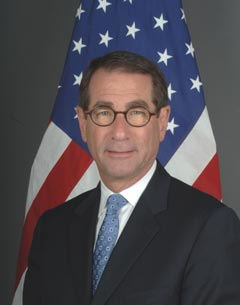

65th United States Ambassador to Spain 3rd United States Ambassador to Andorra
- In office January 27, 2010 – June 28, 2013
- President: Barack Obama
- Preceded by: Eduardo Aguirre
- Succeeded by: James Costos

Personal details
- Born: 1949 (age 76–77) Boston, Massachusetts, U.S.
- Party: Democratic
- Spouse: Susan Lewis
- Education: Tufts University (BA); University of Massachusetts, Lowell (BS)

Alan D. Solomont (born 1949) is the former United States Ambassador to Spain and Andorra. He was selected for the post by President Barack Obama and confirmed by the United States Senate on December 29, 2009.

== Early life and education ==
Born to a Jewish family, Solomont earned a B.A. from Tufts University in Political Science and Urban Studies in 1970 and a degree in nursing from the University of Massachusetts Lowell in 1977.

== Career ==
Active for many years in the Democratic Party, Solomont served as National Finance Chairman of the Democratic National Committee (DNC) in 1997, raising over $40 million. In 2000, President Bill Clinton appointed Solomont to be a member of the Board of Directors of the Corporation for National and Community Service. His term expired in 2004, he was reappointed by President George W. Bush in 2007, and he resigned in 2009.

Solomont has served on the boards of numerous organizations including Angel Healthcare Investors, LLC, Boston Medical Center, The Jewish Fund for Justice, The New Israel Fund, Israel Policy Forum, Jewish Community Housing for the Elderly, and the WGBH Educational Foundation. He formerly chaired the Board of Combined Jewish Philanthropies of Greater Boston.

On June 13, 2013, Solomont was appointed the Pierre and Pamela Omidyar Dean of the Jonathan M. Tisch College of Civic Life at Tufts University in Medford, Massachusetts and announced his intention to retire in 2021.

== Awards and recognitions ==
Solomont received an honorary degree from the University of Massachusetts Lowell. In 2017, the university renamed its School of Nursing to the Susan and Alan Solomont School of Nursing.

== Personal life ==
He is married to Susan Solomont and they live in Weston, Massachusetts; they have two daughters, Rebecca and Stephanie.

Diplomatic posts
Preceded by Eduardo Aguirre	United States Ambassador to Spain; 2010–2013	Succeeded by James Costos
Preceded by Eduardo Aguirre	United States Ambassador to Andorra; 2010–2013	Succeeded by James Costos
