= Duke Buchan =

American diplomat (born 1963)

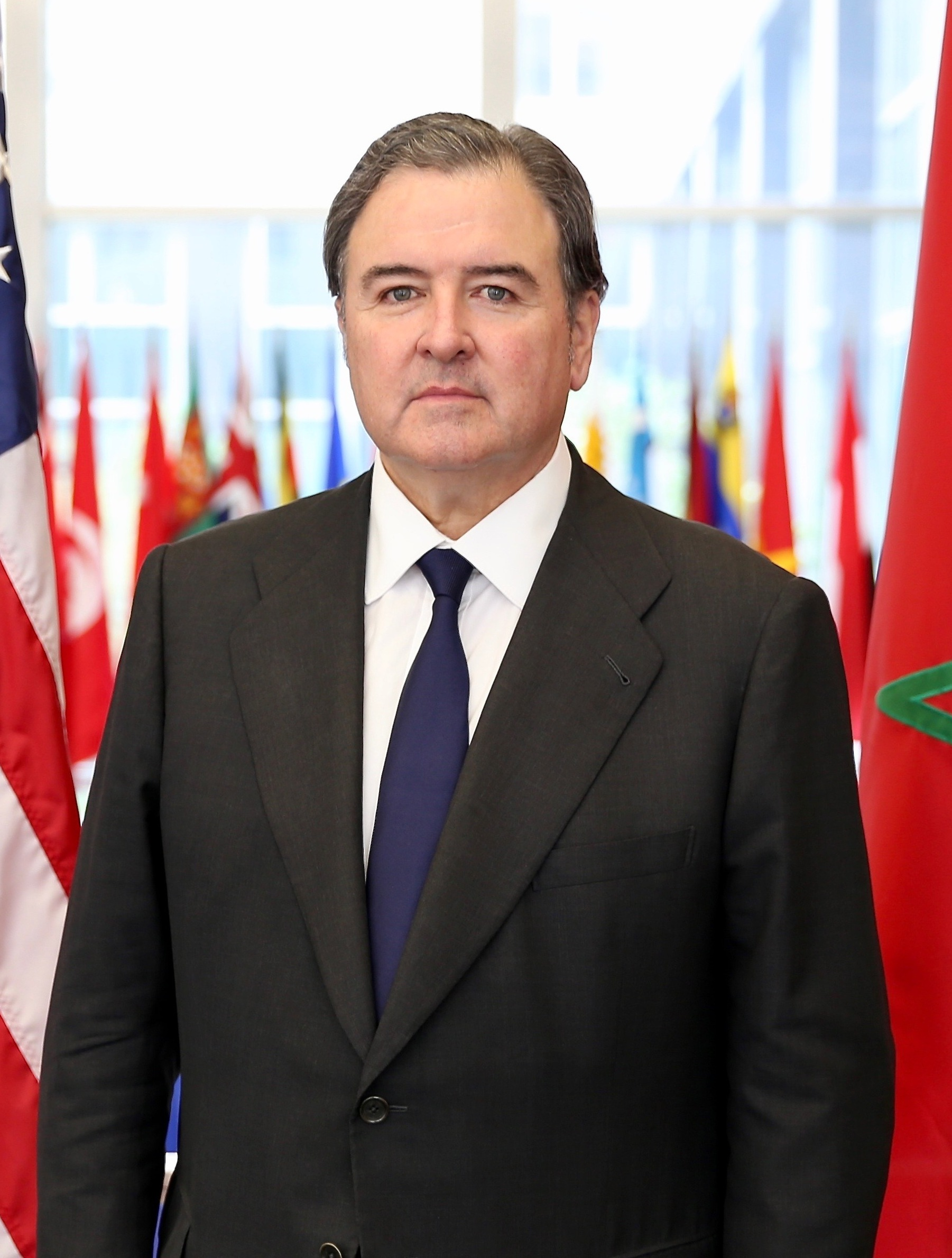
- Buchan in 2025

23rd United States Ambassador to Morocco
- Incumbent
- Assumed office December 2, 2025
- President: Donald Trump
- Preceded by: Puneet Talwar

Finance Chair of the Republican National Committee
- In office January 31, 2022 – March 18, 2025
- Preceded by: Todd Ricketts
- Succeeded by: JD Vance

United States Ambassador to Spain and Andorra
- In office January 18, 2018 – January 20, 2021
- President: Donald Trump
- Preceded by: James Costos
- Succeeded by: Julissa Reynoso Pantaleón

Personal details
- Born: Richard Duke Buchan III; July 3, 1963 (age 63) North Carolina, U.S.
- Party: Republican
- Spouse: Hannah Buchan
- Children: 3
- Education: University of North Carolina at Chapel Hill (BA); Harvard University (MBA)
- Occupation: Financier, diplomat, farmer, philanthropist

Richard Duke Buchan III (born July 3, 1963) is an American financier, diplomat, farmer and philanthropist serving as the United States Ambassador to Morocco since 2025.

He is the founder and CEO of Hunter Global Investors, a private investment management firm. He served as the United States Ambassador to Spain and Andorra from 2017 to 2021, after which he became the finance chair of the Republican National Committee from 2022 to 2025.

== Early life and education ==
A native of North Carolina, Buchan was born on July 3, 1963, and grew up near Henderson on his family's tobacco and cattle farms. He received a BA in economics and Spanish from the University of North Carolina at Chapel Hill (UNC-CH) in 1985, and an MBA from Harvard Business School in 1991.

At UNC-CH, Buchan was enrolled in the university's study abroad program at the University of Seville, Spain from 1983 to 1984 and also studied at the University of Valencia in 1980. In 2012, regarding his studies in Spain, Buchan said, "The study of the Spanish language, literature and cultures provided me a passport to a world outside the U.S. and instilled in me a global perspective."

== Global finance career ==
In the early 1990s, Buchan started his investment banking career. From 1992 to 1997, he was an investment banker at Merrill Lynch, where he specialized in global corporate finance, and mergers and acquisitions in the financial services sector in Latin America, the United States and Europe. In 1997, Buchan joined hedge fund Maverick Capital, where he handled its investments in banks and financial services companies.

In 2001, Buchan founded Hunter Global Investors in New York City. In 2007, Hunter had approximately US$1.5 billion assets under management. He beat U.S. stocks by 46 percent between 2001 and March 2011. Buchan closed one of his funds in December 2011 due to losses stemming from the European debt crisis, and returned money to investors. He converted Hunter Global Investors into a family office to manage his family's assets, and continues to manage two funds, which invest in various industries, including real estate. In 2024, Buchan and his wife Hannah built about 1,500 apartments in the South through their business.

== Diplomacy ==
On November 2, 2017, Buchan was confirmed to his ambassadorships to Spain and Andorra by the United States Senate by voice vote, without any opposition from Democratic or Republican Senators. He was sworn in on December 11, 2017. In 2019 he helped update the bilateral tax agreement to end the double taxation for companies that operate in both countries. As Ambassador to Spain, Buchan encouraged Spain to strengthen its contributions to NATO. He concentrated on investment, tax, and trade issues.

Buchan advocated for democracy and human rights on various fronts, repeatedly speaking out against authoritarian regimes, especially in Venezuela and Cuba. In May 2019, Buchan and seven other ambassadors formed the first U.S. delegation to join the annual March of the Living education program. In November 2019, he traveled to Venezuela's border with Colombia to bring eyewitness attention to the humanitarian crisis caused by the regime of Nicolás Maduro and his primary ally, Cuba. "I saw pregnant Venezuelan women waiting to give birth in an extremely overcrowded maternity ward," Buchan wrote in the Spanish language newspaper El Mundo. "I saw very weak children and the elderly waiting to receive their only meal of the day at a soup kitchen. Children are dying from starvation. The elderly are without medication or care. This must stop now. ... It's time to close the door on tyrants." Buchan met interim Venezuelan President Juan Guaidó in Madrid to reiterate the United States' strong support for the National Assembly. The U.S. Embassy convinced Spanish oil company Repsol to wind down its operations in Venezuela in order to avoid sanctions.

== Politics ==
Buchan has served as a Republican National Committee State Victory Chair for both New York and Florida. He has donated extensively to the Republican National Committee, the National Republican Senatorial Committee, the National Republican Congressional Committee, the Republican Governors Association, and to individuals from his home state of Florida such as Senator Marco Rubio and Senator Rick Scott. After first supporting former Governor Jeb Bush’s 2016 presidential campaign, and serving on the executive committee of Bush's Right to Rise PAC, Buchan and his wife Hannah became early financial supporters of Donald Trump's presidential campaign. In May 2016, Buchan and his wife donated $898,000 to Trump Victory, the highest permitted amount by federal campaign laws. They were the first to give $1 million to the Donald Trump 2016 presidential campaign and have subsequently donated and raised millions more, while remaining among the top two donors for years. Campaign finance records show that he donated over $940,000 to Trump's 2020 campaign. In November 2021, Buchan was named as the next finance chair of the Republican National Committee.

== Philanthropy ==
In 2011, Buchan established The Buchan Excellence Fund in UNC-CH's Department of Romance Languages and Literature, described by the university as "the largest single endowment at Carolina dedicated to support faculty, graduate students and undergraduates in Spanish languages, literature and culture." The fund has helped students and professors further their research on topics in Spanish culture and linguistics, and also enabled them to travel to Spain as well as other Spanish-speaking countries.

In 2012, The Buchan Excellence Fund supported the UNC-CH Department of Romance Languages and Literature's project 21st Century Pen Pals, a video exchange program between American and Spanish schoolchildren.

In December 2016, Buchan House, the new Arts and Sciences Foundation building at UNC-CH, opened after Buchan donated the money to purchase and renovate the old Chapel Hill Public Library to serve as the foundation's new headquarters.

Buchan was vice-chair of the UNC-CH Arts and Sciences Foundation Board of Trustees, is a member of the Chancellor's Philanthropic Council, and serves on the university's Campaign Planning Cabinet.

He has also supported Harvard Business School fundraising.

== Personal life ==
Buchan and his wife Hannah have three children. He owns farms in North Carolina and New York where he grows truffles and over 100 varieties of tomatoes and vegetables, and raises horses. The Buchans run a farm stand, develop new varieties of tomatoes, and donate their produce to charities. Buchan's primary residence is in Palm Beach, Florida and he has a horse farm in Upstate New York and an apartment on Fifth Avenue in New York City.

Buchan is fluent in Spanish, conversant in French, and has a basic knowledge of Italian, German and Catalan.

Diplomatic posts
Preceded by James Costos	United States Ambassador to Spain and Andorra; 2018–2021	Succeeded by Conrad Tribble; Chargé d’Affaires ad interim
