= Eduardo Aguirre (diplomat) =

American diplomat (born 1946)

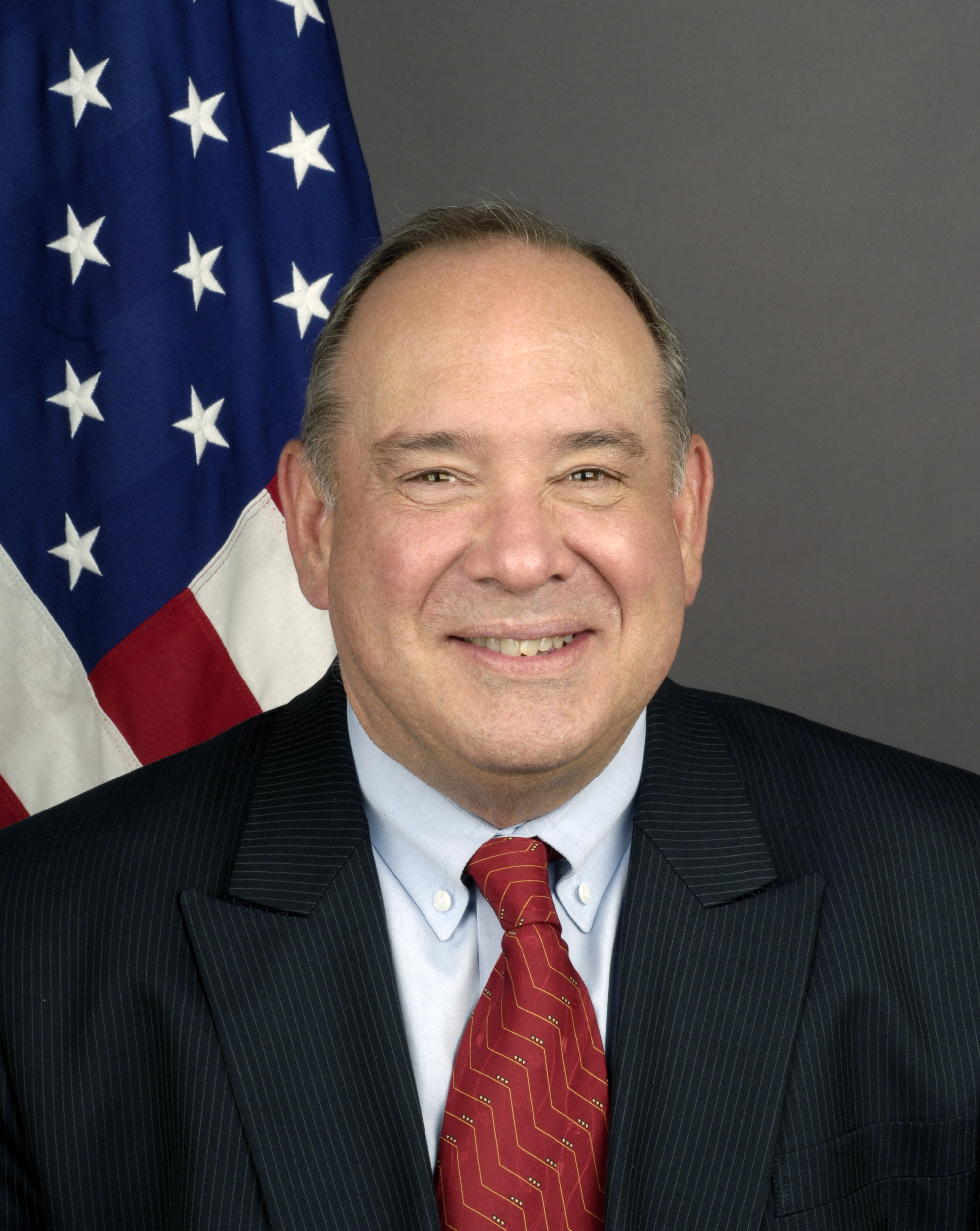

64th United States Ambassador to Spain 2nd United States Ambassador to Andorra
- In office June 29, 2005 – January 20, 2009
- President: George W. Bush
- Preceded by: George Argyros
- Succeeded by: Alan Solomont

Director of United States Citizenship and Immigration Services
- In office August 15, 2003 – June 16, 2005
- President: George W. Bush
- Preceded by: Immigration and Naturalization Service
- Succeeded by: Emilio T. Gonzalez

Personal details
- Born: July 30, 1946 (age 80) Cuba
- Party: Republican
- Education: Louisiana State University
- Profession: Businessman, diplomat, agency director
- Also accredited to Andorra.

Eduardo Aguirre Reyes, Jr. (born July 30, 1946) is a Cuban-born American diplomat, with Atlantic Partners, an international consulting firm based in Houston.

Until January 20, 2009, he was the United States Ambassador to Spain and Andorra, appointed by President George W. Bush, confirmed by the United States Senate on June 16, 2005, and sworn in on June 24, 2005. He presented his credentials to King Juan Carlos I of Spain on June 29, 2005.

== Background ==
Aguirre was born in Cuba in 1946, and emigrated to the US in 1961 via Operation Peter Pan.

Aguirre holds a Bachelor of Science degree from Louisiana State University. He is a graduate of the American Bankers Association's National Commercial Lending Graduate School. He has received honorary doctorates from the University of Connecticut, the University of Houston, and the Universidad Tecnológica de Santiago in the Dominican Republic.

Aguirre and his wife Tere each emigrated from Cuba as unaccompanied minors at the age of 15. They maintain their permanent home in Houston, where they have lived for three decades. The Aguirres have two grown children, Eddy and Tessie.

== Career in banking ==
Aguirre joined the Department of Homeland Security from the Export-Import Bank of the United States (Ex-Im Bank), where he served as vice chairman and chief operating officer. From December 2001 to December 2002, he was acting chairman of this federal agency. Prior to joining the Bush administration, Aguirre was president of international private banking for Bank of America. He had worked for Bank of America for 24 years.

== In Texas ==
In 1990, the Supreme Court of Texas appointed him to the State Bar as a non-attorney director. Aguirre has served on numerous professional and civic boards, including the Texas Children's Hospital, Texas Bar Foundation, Operación Pedro Pan Foundation, Bankers Association for Finance and Trade, and the Houston chapters of the American Red Cross and the Salvation Army.

Aguirre was appointed by then Governor George W. Bush to the board of regents of the University of Houston System for a six-year term, serving from 1996 to 1998 as chairman. Former president George H. W. Bush appointed him to the National Commission for Employment Policy.

== Government service ==
Before his appointment as ambassador, Aguirre served, beginning February 7, 2003, as the first director of U.S. Citizenship and Immigration Services (USCIS), an under secretary rank position in the Department of Homeland Security. At USCIS, Aguirre led a team of 15,000 employees serving over 6 million annual applicants seeking immigration benefits.

Aguirre was the author of one of the first classified U.S. Dept. of State cables released by WikiLeaks on November 28, 2010, in which he described, among other issues, U.S. embassy efforts to derail the legal proceedings against U.S. soldiers accused of killing Spanish journalist José Couso.

== Honors ==
Aguirre was bestowed the Order of Isabella the Catholic Gran Cruz by Spain, Order of José Matías Delgado—Grade of Grand Officer—by El Salvador, and the Order of Christopher Columbus—Grade of Grand Officer—by the Dominican Republic. The Daughters of the American Revolution awarded him their 2004 Americanism Medal.

Aguirre is a member of the Delta Sigma Pi fraternity and received the Delta Sigma Pi Career Achievement Award in 2000. He will receive his Order of the Golden Helmet for 50 years of service with Delta Sigma Pi in March 2019.

Diplomatic posts
Preceded by George Argyros	United States Ambassador to Spain; 2005–2009	Succeeded by Alan Solomont
