= Richard G. Capen Jr. =

US ambassador, businessman (born 1934)

Richard Goodwin Capen Jr.

60th United States Ambassador to Spain
- In office July 8, 1992 – February 17, 1993
- President: George H. W. Bush
- Preceded by: Joseph Zappala
- Succeeded by: Richard N. Gardner

Assistant Secretary of Defense for Legislative Affairs
- In office January 5, 1970 – May 1, 1971
- President: Richard Nixon
- Preceded by: Jack L. Stempler
- Succeeded by: Rady A. Johnson

Personal details
- Born: July 16, 1934 Hartford, Connecticut, U.S.
- Died: September 13, 2026 (aged 92) San Diego, U.S.
- Education: Columbia University (BA)

Richard Goodwin Capen Jr. (July 16, 1934 - September 13, 2026) was an American businessman and former United States Ambassador to Spain from 1992 to 1993.

== Biography ==
Capen was born in Hartford, Connecticut on July 16, 1934. He graduated from Columbia College in 1956 on a Naval Reserve Officers Training Corps scholarship and served in the U.S. Navy after college from 1956 to 1959. He served as the Principal Deputy Assistant Secretary for Public Affairs from 1969-1970 and the Assistant Secretary of Defense for Legislative Affairs from 1970 to 1971 responding to Secretary of Defense Melvin Laird. He was a recipient of the Defense Distinguished Service Medal in 1971.

Before being nominated for ambassadorship, he was vice chairman of the second largest domestic newspaper publisher Knight Ridder from 1989 to 1991 and chairman and publisher of The Miami Herald from 1983 to 1989. Under Capen's stewardship, the newspaper won five Pulitzer Prizes. He also served as the senior vice president of Copley Newspapers. Capen was a member of the Non-Group, a civically influential group of Miami-Dade business elites.

In 1984, Capen received the John Jay Award from Columbia College for distinguished professional achievement. He served as a director of American Funds and Capital Guardian from 1994-2018.

Capen was a long-time resident of La Jolla, California a former executive with Copley Newspapers (1961–1979) and newspaper columnist. He is the author of Finish Strong, published in 1996, and Empowered by Faith, published in 2004. He was a retired director emeritus of the Billy Graham Evangelistic Association.
