= Edward L. Romero =

American diplomat (born 1934)

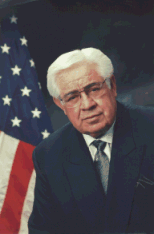

62nd United States Ambassador to Spain
- In office June 30, 1998 – May 1, 2001
- President: Bill Clinton; George W. Bush
- Preceded by: Richard N. Gardner
- Succeeded by: George Argyros

Personal details
- Born: January 2, 1934 (age 92) Alamosa, Colorado
- Party: Democratic
- Spouse: Cayetana Garcia
- Education: Los Angeles State College; Citrus College
- Occupation: Entrepreneur, activist and diplomat

Edward L. Romero (born January 2, 1934) is an American entrepreneur, activist and former diplomat. He served as the U.S. ambassador to Spain and Andorra between the years of 1998 and 2001 and has engaged in various environmental and social causes, winning recognition from organizations in both the U.S. and Spain.

== Biography ==
=== Early years ===
Edward L. Romero was born on January 2, 1934 in Alamosa, Colorado after his family moved there from Albuquerque, New Mexico. His mother was a precinct chairwoman in Southern Colorado for thirty-seven years and a delegate for Adlai Stevenson.

Some of his ancestors were Spanish settlers from Corral de Almaguer, a municipality of Toledo, Castilla La Mancha, and settled in New Mexico in 1598. His grandfather was a Fraternity brother of New Mexico.

His first language was Spanish, but he currently speaks both English and Spanish fluently.

In his youth, he fought in the Korean War, then studied at Los Angeles State College and Citrus College. He moved to New Mexico after he graduated.

During the Vietnam War, he was particularly critical of the war and helped form an activist group called "Veterans Against Vietnam."

=== Political career ===
After the Vietnam War, he became a county chairman of Democratic Party.

He has been a member of the Advisory Committee for the U.S. Trade Representative's Services Policy, leading a number of U.S. delegations to Mexico.

During the Carter administration he served as a member of the Federal Advisory Committee for Trade Negotiations and of the U.S. Delegations on the Helsinki Accords.

=== Ambassador of Andorra and Spain ===
On April 2, 1998, President Bill Clinton announced he would like to nominate Edward L. Romero as the next U.S. ambassador of Spain, and on June 1, Clinton named him to also serve concurrently as Ambassador to Andorra. He was confirmed by the Senate on June 23.

On June 28, Ambassador Romero arrived in Madrid, Spain and on June 30, he presented his credentials to King Juan Carlos.

In 2001 he was replaced by George Argyros as ambassador of Spain.

=== Hispanic Community Leader ===
He founded the Hispanic Culture Foundation and the National Hispanic Cultural Center, and has served on the President's Hispanic Advisory Committee..

He was a founding member of the Chamber of Commerce Albuquerque Hispano and the Board of the Congressional Hispanic Caucus Institute. He was a member of the Hispanic Cultural Foundation and the National Hispanic Cultural Center in New Mexico.

In 1989, the Hispanic Chamber of the Commerce named him the National Hispanic Businessman of the Year.

=== Entrepreneur ===
He is one of the founders of "Valor Telecommunications Southwest, LLC." He was the founder, chairman, and chief executive officer of Advanced Sciences, Inc., an international environmental engineering and waste management corporation. He continued as the president and director after the company merged with Commodore Applied Technologies, Inc.

== Recognitions ==
- In September 1989, the U.S. Small Business Administration named him Region Hispanic Businessman of the Year.
- In 1989, the U.S. Hispanic Chamber of Commerce named him National Hispanic Businessman of the Year.
- In 1991, he was also named in the publication "Hispanic Heroes – Portraits of New Mexicans Who Have Made a Difference," edited by Rose Diaz and Jan Dodson Barnhart
- On March 21, 2001, the King Juan Carlos I of Spain awarded him the Grand Cross of the Order of Isabel I of Castile.
- He has received awards and acknowledgments from various U.S. and Spanish organizations including the National Kidney Foundation, New Mexico Anti-Defamation League, National Hispanic Scholarship Foundation, Multiple Sclerosis Society.
- Honorary Brother of the International Brotherhood of Researchers in Toledo, Spain
- Noble Honorary Brother of the Illustrious and Most Ancient Brotherhood of Mozarabic Knights in Toledo, Spain
- Knight of the Order of the Holy Sepulchre of Jerusalem in Madrid, Spain

== Personal life ==
Romero married Cayetana Garcia and they have four children and eight grandchildren. She is a descendant of the first Spanish settlers of New Mexico.

He claims to be a fan of bullfighting and toreo.

Diplomatic posts
Preceded by Richard N. Gardner	United States Ambassador to Spain; 1998–2001; Also accredited to Andorra.	Succeeded by George Argyros
