= Casparsson =

Casparsson is a Swedish surname. Notable people with the surname include:

- Anna Casparsson (1861–1961), Swedish textile artist
- Ernst Casparsson (1886–1973), Swedish equestrian
- Peter Casparsson (born 1975), Swedish ice hockey player
