= Richard N. Gardner =

American diplomat (1927–2019)

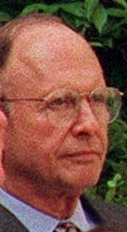

61st United States Ambassador to Spain
- In office September 16, 1993 – July 12, 1997
- President: Bill Clinton
- Preceded by: Richard Goodwin Capen, Jr.
- Succeeded by: Edward L. Romero

United States Ambassador to Italy
- In office March 21, 1977 – February 27, 1981
- President: Jimmy Carter
- Preceded by: John A. Volpe
- Succeeded by: Maxwell M. Rabb

Personal details
- Born: Richard Newton Gardner; July 9, 1927 New York City, U.S.
- Died: February 16, 2019 (aged 91) New York City, U.S.
- Spouse: Danielle L. Gardner
- Children: Anthony L. Gardner; Nina L. Gardner
- Education: Harvard College (BA); Yale University (JD); University of Oxford (DPhil)
- Occupation: professor and diplomat

Richard Newton Gardner (July 9, 1927 – February 16, 2019) was an American diplomat who served as the United States Ambassador to Spain and the United States Ambassador to Italy. He was also a professor emeritus of law at Columbia Law School.

== Life and career ==
Gardner was born in New York City, New York, the son of Ethel (née Alias) and Samuel Gardner (former family name was Goldberg). He served in the United States Armed Forces during World War II. Gardner graduated from Harvard University with a B.A. degree in economics. He then obtained a J.D. from Yale Law School and was a Rhodes Scholar, receiving a Doctor of Philosophy degree in Economics from Oxford University. He wrote several books and articles. Gardner became a member of the American Academy of Arts and Sciences in 1974 and a member of the American Philosophical Society in 1998. Gardner died in New York City on February 16, 2019, at the age of 91.

Diplomatic posts
Preceded by John A. Volpe	United States Ambassador to Italy; 1977–1981	Succeeded by Maxwell M. Rabb
Preceded by Richard Goodwin Capen, Jr.	United States Ambassador to Spain; 1993–1997	Succeeded by Edward L. Romero
