= George Argyros =

United States Ambassador to Spain (born 1937)

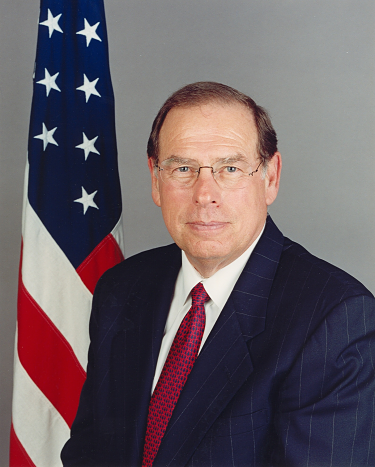

63rd United States Ambassador to Spain 1st United States Ambassador to Andorra
- In office November 21, 2001 – November 21, 2004
- President: George W. Bush
- Preceded by: Edward L. Romero
- Succeeded by: Eduardo Aguirre

Personal details
- Born: George Leon Argyros; February 4, 1937 (age 89) Detroit, Michigan, U.S.
- Spouse: Julia Argyros
- Children: 3, including Melissa Argyros
- Education: Chapman University
- Occupation: Ambassador, real estate investor, and the former owner of the Seattle Mariners

George Leon Argyros (born February 4, 1937) is an American former diplomat who served as the United States Ambassador to Spain. He is also a real estate investor and philanthropist. Argyros was the owner of Major League Baseball's Seattle Mariners from 1981 to 1989. He is the founder and CEO of property firm Arnel & Affiliates.

== Early and personal life ==
Argyros was born on February 4, 1937, in Detroit, Michigan, but raised in Pasadena, California. Argyros is a second-generation American citizen; his grandparents emigrated from Greece. Argyros graduated from Chapman University in 1959 with a major in Business and Economics. He later served on Chapman University's board of trustees, including chairman of the board from 1976 to 2001. The university's college of business and economics is named after him.

Argyros and his wife, Julia, have three children and seven grandchildren. Their son, George Argyros Jr., died of a heart attack in 2020 at the age of 55.

== Business ==
Argyros made his fortune in real estate investments. He originally started his business career running a strip mall and moved on to buying and selling real estate to gas stations. He also was involved in buying and selling property in Southern California. From 1981 to 1989, he was the owner of the Seattle Mariners baseball team.

Argyros has done business through the real estate company Arnel & Affiliates (DBA "Arnel Property Management Company"). Arnel & Affiliates does business primarily in Southern California. Argyros has a net worth around $3 billion and owns around 5,500 apartments in Orange County and nearly 2 million square feet of commercial real estate in Southern California.

Arnel settled a case with the California Attorney General's Office in 2001 for $1.5 million. The case alleged Arnell systematically withheld security deposits from apartment tenants. The company did not admit wrongdoing in the settlement. In 2024, Arnel again settled a case with the California Attorney General regarding withheld security deposits, paying $1.15 million.

In 1981, Argyros and fellow Orange County developer William Lyon bought Newport Beach-based airline AirCal for $61.5 million, later selling it to American Airlines in 1987 for $225 million.

== Politics ==
Argyros served as a member of the Advisory Committee for Trade Policy and Negotiations for the U.S. Trade Ambassador. He resigned from that position in 1990, when President George H. W. Bush appointed him to the board of the Federal Home Loan Mortgage Corporation (Freddie Mac). He completed his term on the Freddie Mac Board in March 1993.

In 2001 Argyros was appointed Ambassador to Spain and Andorra. He was sworn in on November 21, 2001. His appointment came after his fundraising efforts for the Republican Party, including raising $30 million for the 2000 campaign of George W. Bush. He was the ambassador through November 2004.

== Baseball ==
In early 1981, Argyros bought the Seattle Mariners for $13 million (equivalent to $46 million in 2025). He proclaimed upon getting the team that "patience is for losers". In his tenure, the team never had a winning season or finished higher than fourth place in the American League West, with his lack of action to spending money being cited as the reason for the team never rising out of the cellar. The trade of pitcher Mark Langston had him described by one newspaper columnist as the "miserly, mean-spirited owner" of the team. He was criticized for lack of spending by Mariners player Ken Phelps, coach Deron Johnson, and national sportswriter Peter Gammons.

In 1986, with a new tone of saying that patience is for winners, Argyros managed to come to an end of a two-year standoff with the Seattle community over the lease agreement for the Kingdome. It led to an addition of an escape clause that would let the Mariners break their lease on the stadium if they did not average 1.4 million in attendance in the next two years or annually sell 10,000 season tickets (they had sold 3,950 in 1985). This clause would be cited in a battle of ownership sale of the team six years later. In the 1987 MLB draft, Argyros had to be convinced to draft Ken Griffey Jr with the first pick, as he wanted California native Mike Harkey. Gradually, management convinced him to go with Griffey, who would become a future Hall of Famer.

Argyros publicly tried to purchase the San Diego Padres in 1987 and sell the Mariners to local buyers, but he could not finalize a deal with Padres owner Joan Kroc. During the failed purchase attempt, Argyros was fined $10,000 for congratulating Padres manager Larry Bowa after being told not to talk to Padres personnel.

Argyros sold the Mariners to Jeff Smulyan in August 1989, with the team now valued at $76.1 million (equivalent to $197.7 million in 2025). Argyros cited the demands of his business in California and the difficult commute between California and Washington as reasons to sell. Earlier that year, the Mariners pulled its advertising from a Seattle radio station that broadcast a parody song, co-written by Kent Voss & Jimmy Kimmel of radio station KZOK, criticizing Argyros.

== Philanthropy ==
In October 2013, Argyros and his wife Julia announced two $1 million donations benefiting the arts in her hometown of Adrian, Michigan. One was to help kick off a $3.5 million capital campaign for the Croswell Opera House and another was to benefit a fine arts education endowment through the Adrian Schools Educational Foundation.

Argyros' foundation pledged $7.5 million in January 2018 to build a plaza in the Los Angeles Memorial Coliseum. Argyros also donated money towards the construction of a performing arts center at the American School of Madrid and a performing arts center in Ketchum, Idaho.

Argyros is a trustee of his alma mater Chapman University and California Institute of Technology. He was on the board of directors of the Richard Nixon Foundation. He was a board member for the Center for Strategic and International Studies.

In September 2023, the Argyros family announced a $10 million donation to Chapman's business school, which is named after him.

== See also ==
- List of billionaires

Diplomatic posts
Preceded by Edward L. Romero	U.S. Ambassador to Spain; 2001–2004; Also accredited to Andorra.	Succeeded by Eduardo Aguirre
