= Finn M. W. Caspersen =

American financier, attorney, philanthropist (1941-2009)

Finn M. W. Caspersen Sr.
- Caspersen, c. 2008
- Born: October 27, 1941; New York City, U.S.
- Died: September 7, 2009 (aged 67); Westerly, Rhode Island, U.S.
- Cause of death: Suicide by gunshot to the head
- Education: Peddie School; Brown University (B.A.); Harvard Law School (LL.B.)
- Occupations: attorney, corporate chief executive, philanthropist
- Employer(s): Beneficial Corporation (1972–1998), Knickerbocker Management (1998–2009)
- Spouse: Barbara Warden Morris (m. 1967–2009, his death)
- Children: 4 sons

Finn Michael Westby Caspersen Sr. (October 27, 1941 – September 7, 2009) was an American financier and philanthropist. A graduate of the Peddie School, Brown University and Harvard Law School, he was chairman and chief executive of Beneficial Corporation, one of the largest consumer finance companies in the United States. After an $8.6 billion acquisition of Beneficial by Household International in 1998, Caspersen ran Knickerbocker Management, a private financial firm overseeing the assets of trusts and foundations.

As a philanthropist, Caspersen donated tens of millions of dollars to the Peddie School, Brown, Harvard, and Drew University, while overseeing the Hodson Trust, which benefitted four institutions in Maryland. He described education as his "particular love" and regarded it as "an investment in the future—an investment in human capital." Buildings and endowed professorships have been named in his honor. Caspersen's philanthropy extended to rowing and equestrian sports, and service to the United States Equestrian Team Foundation, Princeton National Rowing Association, and the National Rowing Foundation.

Caspersen was an influential donor to Republican candidates at the state and national level. In the 1980s, he was a major supporter of former New Jersey governor Thomas Kean. He served as a town commissioner in Jupiter Island, Florida, an exclusive upper-class enclave, for four years, resigning a few weeks before his death in September 2009. Following his death, news reports linked Caspersen with allegations of large-scale tax evasion.

== Early life and education ==
Caspersen was born on October 27, 1941, in New York City. He was one of two sons of Olaus Westby Caspersen (1896–1971), and Freda Resika (1909–1991) thought to be of Russian or Polish descent. Olaus's widowed mother and siblings had emigrated to the United States earlier, leaving Olaus in Norway to complete his education. Olaus came to the United States in 1912 at age 16, settling in Weehawken, New Jersey.

Caspersen's mother, Freda, was a non-practicing Jew, and his father thought that his sons needed a religious upbringing. Finn attended a congregational church near the family home in his youth. He later reflected that "being Protestant was important. There was a kind of anti-Catholicism in the family." The family moved to homes in Andover, New Jersey, and Venice, Florida. Caspersen frequently visited Norway as a child, vacationing there during summers after 1947.

Caspersen attended private schools until the ninth grade. He attended the Peddie School, a private preparatory school in Hightstown, New Jersey, and was graduated in 1959. Caspersen received a Bachelor of Arts (B.A.) degree from Brown University in 1963 and a law degree (LL.B.) from Harvard Law School in 1966.

== Career ==
In 1972, Caspersen joined the legal department at Beneficial Corporation, a large American consumer finance firm. Four years later, he was named the firm's chief executive officer. Beneficial had been established in 1914 in Elizabeth, New Jersey, by Clarence Hodson. Caspersen's father, Olaus, joined Beneficial in 1920 and served as Hodson's secretary for several years. In 1929, Hodson and Caspersen reorganized the firm as Beneficial Finance Corporation and transformed it into one of the largest consumer loan providers in the United States. Freda Caspersen was one of the company's directors.

Under the younger Caspersen's leadership, Beneficial expanded into credit finance and offered credit cards through its People's Bank and Trust subsidiary. It purchased Parliament Leasing in 1977, and First Texas Financial Corp., a savings and loan firm, in 1978. In 1977, Beneficial entered the reinsurance business through subsidiaries, but these endeavors led to significant financial losses in the 1980s. Beneficial later downsized its reinsurance holdings and restructured to emphasize its second mortgage business. According to Charles "Sandy" Hance, former senior vice president and general counsel of Beneficial, Caspersen was a "pioneer in second mortgages, which later evolved into home equity loans", and that he "saw this trend developing at a very early stage".

Caspersen purchased Harbour Island in Tampa, Florida, from a Beneficial subsidiary in 1979, and in 1983 began to re-develop the island into an upscale residential and commercial development similar to the Inner Harbor in Baltimore, Maryland. Beneficial purchased the 177-acre man-made island, formerly known as Seddon Island. Before it was developed, local newspapers described the Harbour Island as "an industrial wasteland inhabited by wild pigs" and the only structures as rusted railroad tracks and an unused phosphate facility. When the first phases were complete, the island opened with events hosted by former U.S. president Gerald Ford. After seven years of dwindling business, Beneficial converted the development into office space, and renamed it Knights Point in 1995.

Caspersen ran Beneficial for 22 years before its 1998 acquisition by Household International for $8.6 billion. At the time of the acquisition, Beneficial had 25,000 employees and operated 1,650 branch offices throughout the United States. Caspersen was paid $24 million in severance and other payments. His next business endeavor was Knickerbocker Management, which he founded in 1998 with a few partners. Knickerbocker, a private investment firm that oversaw approximately $1 billion in assets of trusts and foundations, had offices in Gladstone, New Jersey and Hobe Sound, Florida.

== Political activities ==
Caspersen became an influential donor to state and federal Republican party candidates, including former New Jersey governors Thomas Kean and Christine Todd Whitman, and Kean's son Thomas Kean Jr., a state senator and candidate for United States Senator. Caspersen was a major supporter of Kean's two campaigns for governor in 1981 and 1985. When Kean was inaugurated in 1982, Caspersen, an avid equestrian, dressed in period costume and drove the incoming governor and his wife, as well as outgoing governor Brendan Byrne, to an inauguration party in a four-horse carriage. One writer described the scene as "something out of 'a Currier & Ives print'". In 1998, Whitman appointed Caspersen to chair a 15-member advisory panel to recommend future development for Ellis Island, and to a public-private partnership to foster business in the state. According to Vanity Fair contributor William D. Cohan, left-wing magazine Mother Jones found that "Caspersen and his wife donated $602,250 to political campaigns, making them the eighth-largest political donors in the U.S." during the 2000 election cycle.

In 2005, Caspersen sought a seat on the town commission in Jupiter Island, Florida; his platform focused on conservation, limiting development, and burying utility cables. He served a four-year term and ran unopposed for re-election in 2009. He surprised his fellow commission members and neighbors by suddenly resigning on August 4, 2009, claiming that he anticipated moving from the community.

== Philanthropy ==
Caspersen served as a board member, president, and chairman of the United States Equestrian Team from 1982 to 2002. He was considered "the man who put American combined driving on the international map". During his 20-year tenure, American riders and drivers earned 71 medals, including 25 gold, in the Olympics, World Championships, and Pan American Games. Caspersen helped the U.S. Equestrian Team establish a permanent home at Hamilton Farm, the former estate of U.S. Treasury Secretary Nicholas F. Brady in Bedminster, New Jersey. The Hamilton Farm property was owned by Beneficial and was located next to the corporation's headquarters. Beneficial deeded the property to the team at Caspersen's urging.

Caspersen supported rowing, and was involved with the Princeton National Rowing Association (PNRA) and Princeton International Regatta Association (PIRA). In 1998, he provided funding to build a boathouse to benefit the rowing programs of Peddie and the nearby Lawrenceville School on the north shore of Mercer Lake in West Windsor, New Jersey. Located at the Mercer Lake Race Course—site of the 1988, 1992, 2004 and 2008 United States Olympic Rowing Team Trials—the facility is used for training, racing, camps, clinics and administration by Peddie, Lawrenceville, the Hun School, high schools in Mercer County, New Jersey, USRowing, the US National Team, and the Mercer Junior Rowing Club, as well as PNRA and PIRA.

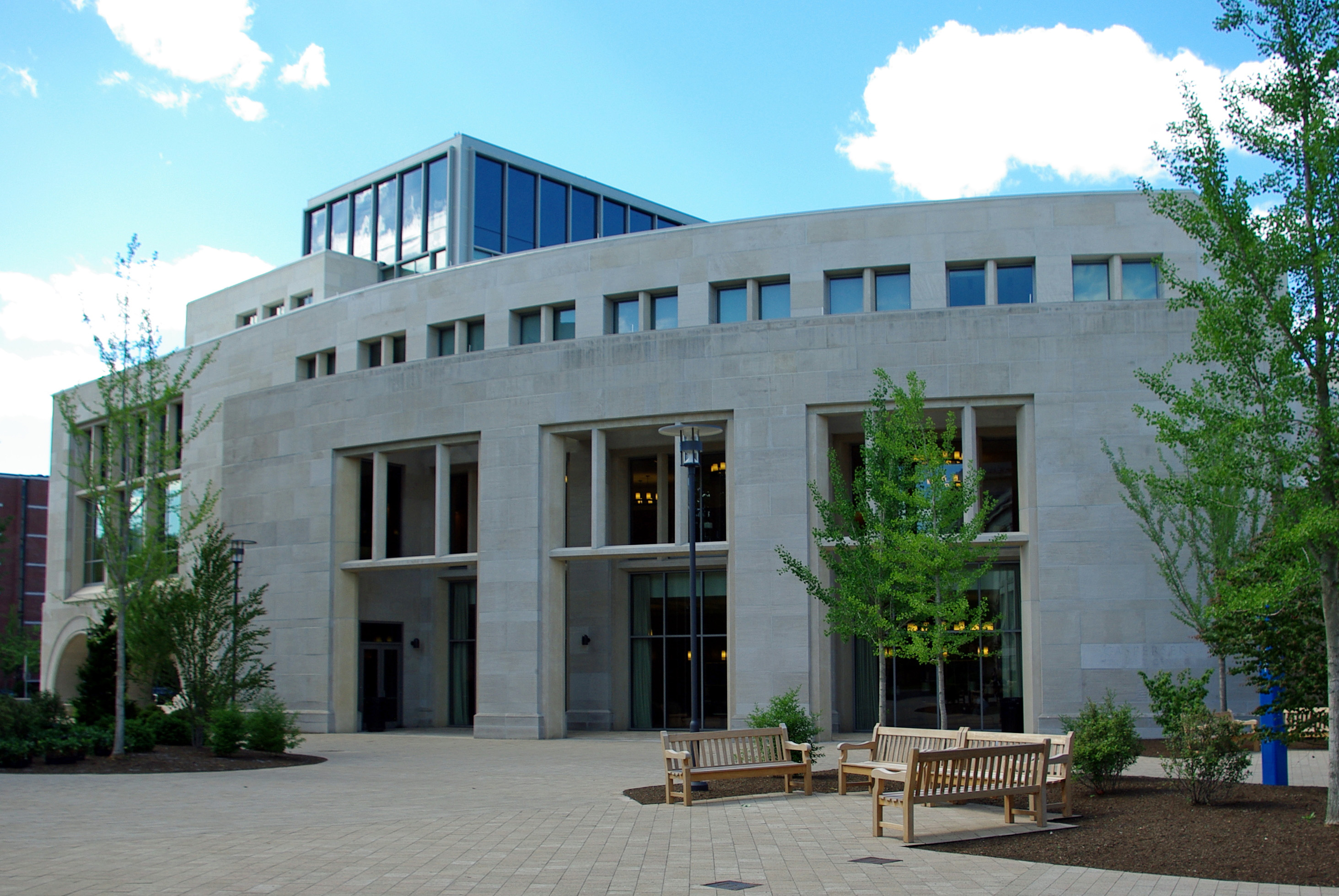
The Caspersen Student Center at Harvard Law School

Throughout his life, Caspersen was closely involved with the management of several universities and schools, serving on the directing boards of the Peddie School, Brown, and the Dean's Advisory Board at Harvard Law School. In a 2008 interview, he stated that he believed education was "investment in the future—an investment in human capital. I've been active in a range of other things, but education's always been my particular love".

Caspersen endowed two professorships at Harvard Law School—the Beneficial Professorship of Law, and the Finn M.W. Caspersen and Household International Professorship of Law. In 2003, he was chairman of Harvard Law School's capital campaign, which he helped jump-start by pledging $30 million—the largest single donation in the school's history. The campaign ultimately raised $476,475,707. The law school honored Caspersen by naming a special collections room in its Library after him. In April 2012, Harvard dedicated part of a 250,000-square-foot multipurpose construction project, which housed student organizations, journals, and social activities, to Caspersen, calling it the Caspersen Student Center. Critics attacked Harvard's decision to name the facilities after Caspersen after his alleged tax evasion was made public.

Barbara Caspersen has served as trustee (currently as an emeritus trustee) of Drew University and as both chairwoman and vice-chairwoman of the liberal arts college's board. In 1999, the Caspersens provided a $5 million gift for expanding graduate education programs at Drew. In honor of their service to the university, Drew renamed its graduate school as the Caspersen School of Graduate Studies. The university's Rose Memorial Library houses a collection of books, manuscripts, artifacts and papers of Nebraska-born author Willa Cather (1873–1947) assembled from items given by several donors—including significant contributions by Caspersen and his wife. It is regarded as one of the best collection of Cather's papers assembled in the United States.

Caspersen donated funds to build a four-level annex, named in honor of his parents, to Brown University's historic John Carter Brown Library, dedicated in 1991. Caspersen also served as a trustee of the Peddie School starting in 1970, and as the board's chairman starting in 1976. In 1998, he and philanthropist Walter H. Annenberg each donated $10 million to the school. The Caspersen Campus Center, which opened in 1996, and Caspersen History House, dedicated in 2006, were named in his honor.

From 1976 until a few weeks before his death, Caspersen ran the Hodson Trust, established by Beneficial founder Clarence Hodson to award grants to four colleges in Maryland: Hood College, Johns Hopkins University, St. John's College, and Washington College. Under the first 25 years of Caspersen's stewardship, the trust donated over $118 million to the four institutions. Caspersen was awarded honorary degrees for his service to education; Washington College conferred an honorary Doctor of Humanities degree in 1981 and Hood College awarded Caspersen with an honorary Doctor of Laws degree in 1983.

== Personal life ==
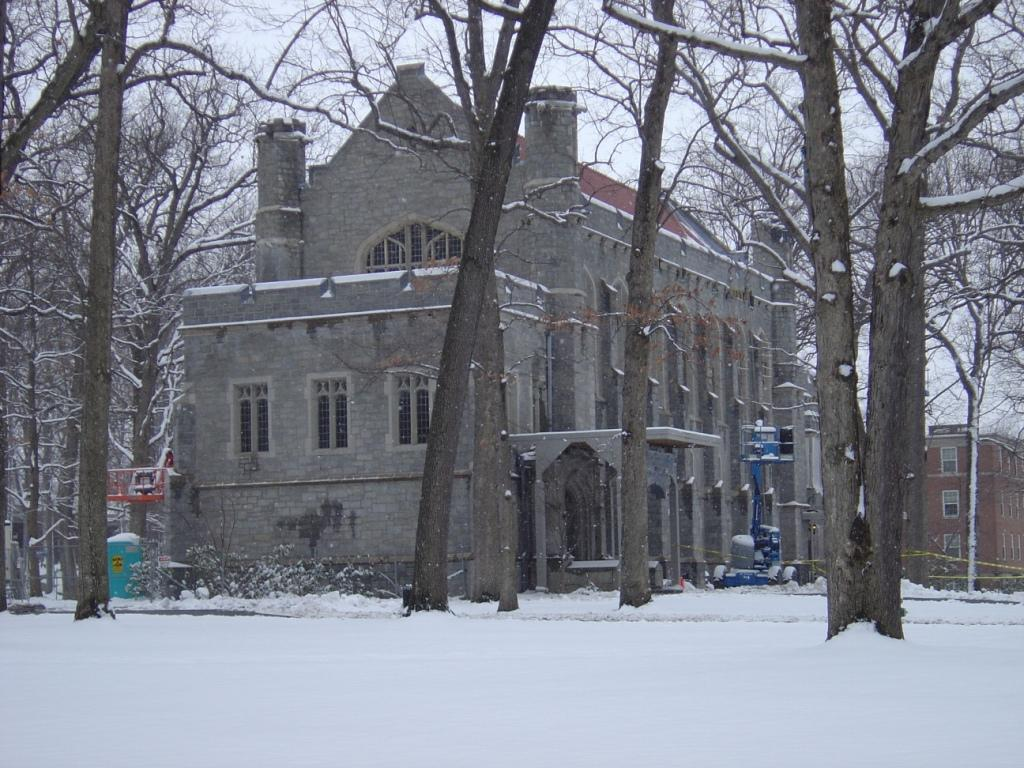
S. W. Bowne Hall at Drew University houses the Caspersen School of Graduate Studies.

In 1967, Caspersen married Barbara Warden Morris, the daughter of Samuel Wheeler Morris Jr. (1918–1995) and Eleanor May Jones (1919–2011), one of Philadelphia's socially prominent Main Line families. They were married for 42 years. Caspersen met his wife when she was an undergraduate student at Wellesley College. She later obtained a masters and doctoral degree from Drew University, submitting a masters thesis on Henry David Thoreau's Walden, and a doctoral dissertation on the works of Willa Cather. For several years, Barbara Caspersen served on the university's board of trustees.

The Caspersens had two homes in New Jersey. One was located in Andover, and the other was located in Bernardsville; both areas have been described as "New Jersey horse country". They also owned a 6,500-square-foot waterfront estate in Westerly, Rhode Island and a residence in Jupiter Island, Florida.

The couple had four sons, Finn M. W. Caspersen Jr., Erik M. W. Caspersen, Samuel M. W. Caspersen, and Andrew W. W. Caspersen. All four of his sons were graduated from Harvard Law School. Pulitzer Prize-winning journalist and Harvard alumnus Daniel Golden, in a book criticizing the role of privilege and wealth at elite colleges, attributed their admission to the prestigious law school to their father's generosity.

Caspersen served as an officer in the United States Coast Guard. He was a member of the Knickerbocker Club, an exclusive, upper-class, men-only social club on New York City's Upper East Side. He was a talented equestrian in combined driving, winning three national championships and representing the United States at three world championships. In 1985, he won the four-in-hand carriage driving competition at the Royal Windsor Horse Show in the United Kingdom and later was an honorary lifetime officer of the show. According to Sports Illustrated, Caspersen, described as "portly and patrician, tall and splendidly erect, with a lot of beef in his jowls" recalled being asked by Queen Elizabeth II at the awards ceremony about his role in driving his team of Holsteiners: "I told her it was to lower the carriage's center of gravity, ... She looked at my midriff and said I was well suited for the job."

== Death and aftermath ==
Caspersen died on September 7, 2009, in the Shelter Harbor community of Westerly, Rhode Island, from an apparent gunshot wound to the head. The cause of death was ruled to be suicide. A blued-steel .38-calibre, five-shot Smith & Wesson revolver belonging to Caspersen was found near his body. According to law enforcement sources investigating the suicide, Caspersen left a note stating that he "was tired, diminished and in constant pain, and that he did not want to be a burden to his loving family".

Caspersen had been battling kidney cancer before his death, and reportedly pursued regular chemotherapy treatment. Several sources described his health as deteriorating and the cancer severe. Others indicated that his medical condition led to depression, describing an uncertainty that left him "sort of horrified about his medical outcome". Bernard Davidoff, an internist from New Jersey apparently familiar with Caspersen's medical care, advised police that Caspersen "suffered from severe depression and was taking antidepressant medications, heart, liver, kidney, and diabetes medications". It was also reported that medical problems and chemotherapy treatments "had severely hobbled him in recent years".

A memorial service held on September 15, 2009, at St. Peter's Episcopal Church in Morristown, New Jersey, was attended by 900 friends and relatives. Caspersen was eulogized by former New Jersey governor and Drew University president Thomas Kean.

In the weeks after his death, reports emerged that Caspersen had listed his Westerly, Rhode Island, home for sale for $10.9 million and was facing financial and legal difficulties. Caspersen had also begun to step back from various philanthropic efforts and institutional boards at Harvard, Peddie, and the Hodson Trust. Eight days after his death in 2009, The New York Times reported that Caspersen was being investigated by the Internal Revenue Service, was suspected of owing as much as $100 million in back taxes and fines, and was facing possible imprisonment. The Times added that Caspersen was caught up in a broader federal investigation into tax havens and offshore bank accounts used by wealthy Americans to avoid paying taxes in Switzerland and Liechtenstein. It was reported that his name was turned over to federal investigators by Swiss banking giant UBS earlier in the year, and in connection to Liechtenstein Global Trust (LGT), a private bank controlled by Liechtenstein's royal family.

== See also ==
- 2008 Liechtenstein tax affair
- Offshore financial centre
- UBS tax evasion controversies
