= Peter Casparsson =

Swedish ice hockey player and coach

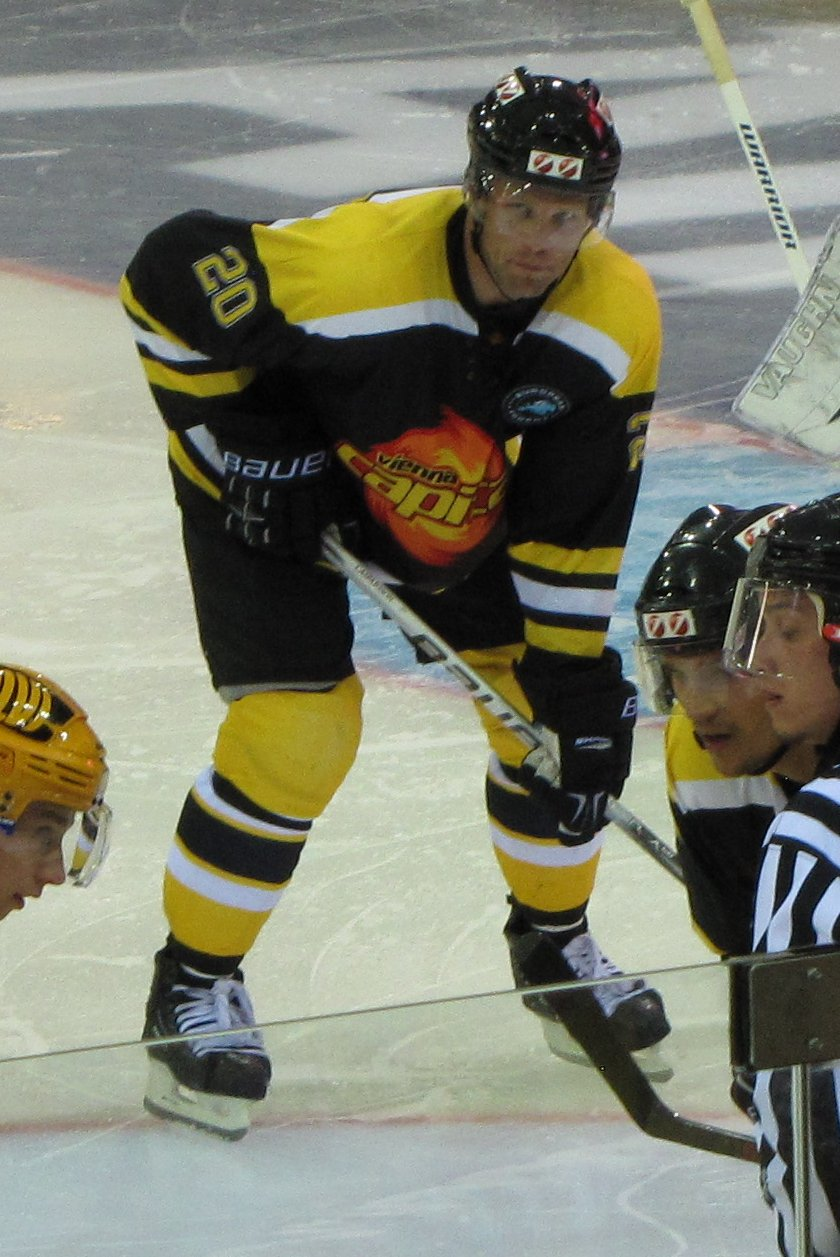
- Peter Casparsson playing for the Vienna Capitals in the European Trophy in August 2011
- Born: 14 March 1975 (age 50); Falun, SWE
- Height: 6 ft 0 in (183 cm)
- Weight: 201 lb (91 kg; 14 st 5 lb)
- Position: Defence
- Shot: Left
- Played for: Leksands IF; Linköping HC; Malmö IF; SG Cortina; Straubing Tigers; Vienna Capitals
- Playing career: 1994–2012

Peter Casparsson (born 14 March 1975 in Falun) is a Swedish former professional ice hockey defenceman currently a goaltending coach for Mora IK of the HockeyAllsvenskan

He played in the Swedish Elitserien for Leksands IF, Linköpings HC and Malmö IF. In 2005, he moved Italy and played in Serie A for SG Cortina and then in 2006 he moved to Germany's Deutsche Eishockey Liga and played for the Straubing Tigers. He played the last five seasons of his career with the Vienna Capitals of the Austrian Hockey League before announcing his retirement on July 30, 2012. He would immediately assume a coaching role with Mora IK.

== Career statistics ==
| | | | Regular season | | | | | Playoffs |
| Season | Team | League | GP | G | A | Pts | PIM | GP | G | A | Pts | PIM |
|---|---|---|---|---|---|---|---|---|---|---|---|---|
| 1992–93 | Leksands IF U20 | JuniorAllsvenskan | 16 | 3 | 4 | 7 | 4 | — | — | — | — | — |
| 1993–94 | Leksands IF U20 | JuniorAllsvenskan | 14 | 1 | 10 | 11 | 22 | — | — | — | — | — |
| 1993–94 | Leksands IF | SHL | 1 | 0 | 0 | 0 | 0 | — | — | — | — | — |
| 1994–95 | Leksands IF J20 | J20 SuperElit | 25 | 7 | 12 | 19 | 40 | — | — | — | — | — |
| 1994–95 | Leksands IF | SHL | 14 | 1 | 0 | 1 | 2 | 2 | 0 | 0 | 0 | 0 |
| 1995–96 | Leksands IF J20 | J20 SuperElit | 28 | 15 | 10 | 25 | 30 | — | — | — | — | — |
| 1995–96 | Leksands IF | SHL | 11 | 0 | 0 | 0 | 0 | 4 | 0 | 0 | 0 | 0 |
| 1996–97 | Rögle BK | Division 1 | 32 | 2 | 7 | 9 | 26 | — | — | — | — | — |
| 1996–97 | Rögle BK J20 | J20 SuperElit | 3 | 0 | 1 | 1 | 0 | — | — | — | — | — |
| 1997–98 | Rögle BK | Division 1 | 32 | 4 | 13 | 17 | 38 | — | — | — | — | — |
| 1998–99 | Linköping HC | Division 1 | 41 | 3 | 5 | 8 | 26 | 10 | 1 | 1 | 2 | 6 |
| 1999–00 | Linköping HC | SHL | 48 | 11 | 8 | 19 | 42 | 10 | 3 | 6 | 9 | 8 |
| 2000–01 | Linköping HC | Allsvenskan | 36 | 3 | 15 | 18 | 38 | 10 | 2 | 2 | 4 | 12 |
| 2001–02 | Linköping HC | SHL | 49 | 6 | 9 | 15 | 38 | — | — | — | — | — |
| 2002–03 | Linköping HC | SHL | 30 | 2 | 2 | 4 | 28 | 10 | 0 | 5 | 5 | 10 |
| 2002–03 | Malmö Redhawks | SHL | 16 | 0 | 3 | 3 | 8 | — | — | — | — | — |
| 2003–04 | Linköping HC J20 | J20 SuperElit | 1 | 1 | 0 | 1 | 2 | — | — | — | — | — |
| 2003–04 | Linköping HC | SHL | 30 | 4 | 3 | 7 | 24 | 5 | 0 | 1 | 1 | 2 |
| 2004–05 | Linköping HC J20 | J20 SuperElit | 1 | 0 | 0 | 0 | 2 | — | — | — | — | — |
| 2004–05 | Linköping HC | SHL | 45 | 0 | 2 | 2 | 16 | 6 | 0 | 0 | 0 | 0 |
| 2005–06 | SG Cortina | Italy | 45 | 8 | 25 | 33 | 60 | 5 | 0 | 3 | 3 | 10 |
| 2006–07 | Straubing Tigers | DEL | 51 | 5 | 13 | 18 | 77 | — | — | — | — | — |
| 2007–08 | Vienna Capitals | EBEL | 45 | 5 | 14 | 19 | 60 | 7 | 0 | 3 | 3 | 8 |
| 2008–09 | Vienna Capitals | EBEL | 53 | 6 | 25 | 31 | 78 | 12 | 0 | 1 | 1 | 16 |
| 2009–10 | Vienna Capitals | EBEL | 54 | 12 | 27 | 39 | 54 | 12 | 2 | 6 | 8 | 8 |
| 2010–11 | Vienna Capitals | EBEL | 54 | 3 | 23 | 26 | 55 | 11 | 1 | 3 | 4 | 10 |
| 2011–12 | Vienna Capitals | EBEL | 48 | 3 | 6 | 9 | 20 | 7 | 1 | 0 | 1 | 4 |
| SHL totals | | | 244 | 24 | 27 | 51 | 158 | 37 | 3 | 12 | 15 | 20 |
| EBEL totals | | | 254 | 29 | 95 | 124 | 267 | 49 | 4 | 13 | 17 | 46 |
