= List of ambassadors of the United States to Spain =

Ambassador of the United States of America to Spain
- Embajador de los Estados Unidos de América en España
- Seal of the United States Department of State

- Flag of a United States ambassador

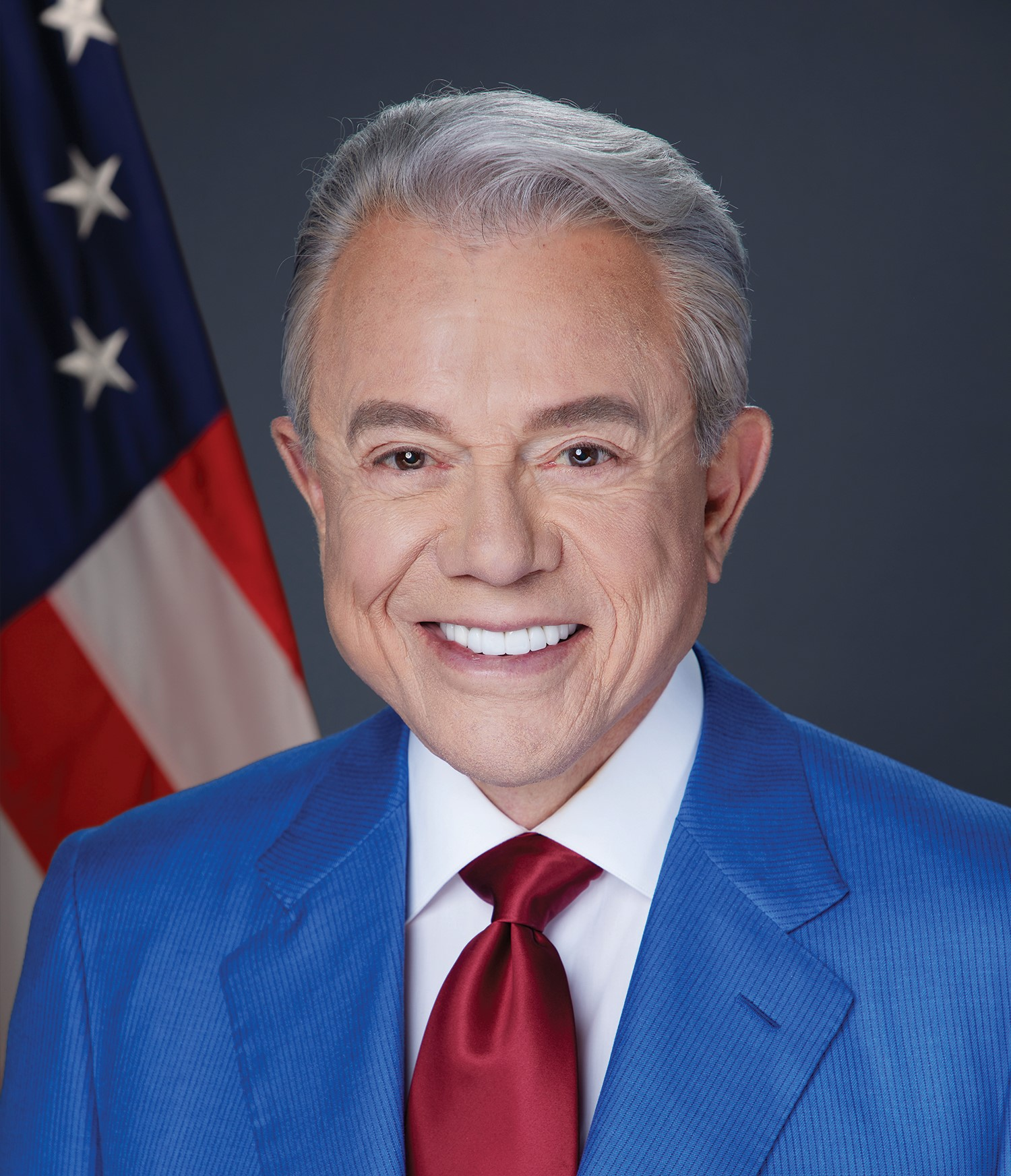
- Incumbent; Benjamin Leon since February 18, 2026
- Reports to: United States Secretary of State
- Nominator: The president of the United States
- Appointer: The president; with Senate advice and consent
- Inaugural holder: John Jay as Minister Plenipotentiary
- Formation: September 29, 1779 (247 years ago)
- Website: U.S. Embassy - Madrid

This is a list of United States ambassadors to Spain from 1779 to the present day. The ambassador to Spain is also credentialed to Andorra.

== Chiefs of mission ==
Denotes chargé d’affaires ad interim

#	Name	Image	Type of appointee	Title	Appointment	Presentation of credentials	Termination of mission	President(s)
-	William Carmichael			Chargé d'Affaires	Apr 20, 1790	No report has been found concerning Carmichael's presentation of credentials as Chargé d'Affaires en titre; he had already been received as Chargé d'Affaires ad interim, May 20, 1782.	Presented recall Sep 5, 1794	George Washington (Unaffiliated)
1	William Short			Minister Resident	May 28, 1794	Sep 7, 1794	Left post, Nov 1, 1795	George Washington (Unaffiliated)
2	David Humphreys			Minister Plenipotentiary	May 20, 1796	Sep 10, 1797	Probably presented recall soon after December 28, 1801	John Adams (Federalist)
2	David Humphreys			Minister Plenipotentiary	May 20, 1796	Sep 10, 1797	Probably presented recall soon after December 28, 1801	Thomas Jefferson (Democratic-Republican)
3	Charles Pinckney			Minister Plenipotentiary	Jun 6, 1801	January–March 1802	Presented recall, Oct 25, 1804	Thomas Jefferson (Democratic-Republican)
-	George W. Erving			Chargé d'Affaires ad interim	Oct 1805		Feb 1810	Thomas Jefferson (Democratic-Republican)
-	George W. Erving			Chargé d'Affaires ad interim	Oct 1805		Feb 1810	James Madison (Democratic-Republican)
4	George W. Erving			Minister Plenipotentiary	Aug 10, 1814	Aug 24, 1816	Left post, May 15, 1819	James Madison (Democratic-Republican)
4	George W. Erving			Minister Plenipotentiary	Aug 10, 1814	Aug 24, 1816	Left post, May 15, 1819	James Monroe (Democratic-Republican)
5	John Forsyth			Minister Plenipotentiary	Feb 16, 1819	May 18, 1819	Had farewell audience, Mar 2, 1823	James Monroe (Democratic-Republican)
6	Hugh Nelson			Minister Plenipotentiary	Jan 15, 1823	Dec 4, 1823	Presented recall Jul 10, 1825	James Monroe (Democratic-Republican)
6	Hugh Nelson			Minister Plenipotentiary	Jan 15, 1823	Dec 4, 1823	Presented recall Jul 10, 1825	John Quincy Adams (Democratic-Republican)
7	Alexander Hill Everett			Envoy Extraordinary and Minister Plenipotentiary	Mar 9, 1825	Sep 4, 1825	Left post Aug 1, 1829	John Quincy Adams (Democratic-Republican)
7	Alexander Hill Everett			Envoy Extraordinary and Minister Plenipotentiary	Mar 9, 1825	Sep 4, 1825	Left post Aug 1, 1829	Andrew Jackson (Democratic)
8	Cornelius P. Van Ness			Envoy Extraordinary and Minister Plenipotentiary	Jun 1, 1829	Dec 9, 1829	Presented recall, Dec 21, 1836	Andrew Jackson (Democratic)
9	John H. Eaton			Envoy Extraordinary and Minister Plenipotentiary	Mar 16, 1836	No report has been found of Eaton's presentation of credentials, which probably took place about February 1, 1837	Left post, May 1, 1840	Andrew Jackson (Democratic)
9	John H. Eaton			Envoy Extraordinary and Minister Plenipotentiary	Mar 16, 1836	No report has been found of Eaton's presentation of credentials, which probably took place about February 1, 1837	Left post, May 1, 1840	Martin Van Buren (Democratic)
-	Aaron Vail			Chargé d'Affaires	May 20, 1840	Nov 5, 1840	Superseded, Aug 1, 1842	Martin Van Buren (Democratic)
-	Aaron Vail			Chargé d'Affaires	May 20, 1840	Nov 5, 1840	Superseded, Aug 1, 1842	William Henry Harrison (Whig)
-	Aaron Vail			Chargé d'Affaires	May 20, 1840	Nov 5, 1840	Superseded, Aug 1, 1842	John Tyler (Whig/Unaffiliated)
10	Washington Irving			Envoy Extraordinary and Minister Plenipotentiary	Feb 10, 1842	Aug 1, 1842	Presented recall, Jul 29, 1846	John Tyler (Whig/Unaffiliated)
10	Washington Irving			Envoy Extraordinary and Minister Plenipotentiary	Feb 10, 1842	Aug 1, 1842	Presented recall, Jul 29, 1846	James K. Polk (Democratic)
11	Romulus M. Saunders			Envoy Extraordinary and Minister Plenipotentiary	Feb 25, 1846	Jul 31, 1846	Presented recall, Sep 24, 1849	James K. Polk (Democratic)
11	Romulus M. Saunders			Envoy Extraordinary and Minister Plenipotentiary	Feb 25, 1846	Jul 31, 1846	Presented recall, Sep 24, 1849	Zachary Taylor (Whig)
12	Daniel M. Barringer			Envoy Extraordinary and Minister Plenipotentiary	Jun 18, 1849	October 24, 1849	Presented recall Sep 4, 1853	Zachary Taylor (Whig)
12	Daniel M. Barringer			Envoy Extraordinary and Minister Plenipotentiary	Jun 18, 1849	October 24, 1849	Presented recall Sep 4, 1853	Millard Fillmore (Whig)
12	Daniel M. Barringer			Envoy Extraordinary and Minister Plenipotentiary	Jun 18, 1849	October 24, 1849	Presented recall Sep 4, 1853	Franklin Pierce (Democratic)
13	Pierre Soule			Envoy Extraordinary and Minister Plenipotentiary	Apr 7, 1853	Oct 24, 1853	Presented recall, Feb 1, 1855	Franklin Pierce (Democratic)
14	Angus C. Dodge			Envoy Extraordinary and Minister Plenipotentiary	Feb 9, 1855	Jun 17, 1855	Presented recall, Mar 12, 1859	Franklin Pierce (Democratic)
14	Angus C. Dodge			Envoy Extraordinary and Minister Plenipotentiary	Feb 9, 1855	Jun 17, 1855	Presented recall, Mar 12, 1859	James Buchanan (Democratic)
15	William Preston			Envoy Extraordinary and Minister Plenipotentiary	Dec 15, 1858	Mar 12, 1859	Presented recall, May 24, 1861	James Buchanan (Democratic)
15	William Preston			Envoy Extraordinary and Minister Plenipotentiary	Dec 15, 1858	Mar 12, 1859	Presented recall, May 24, 1861	Abraham Lincoln (Republican)
16	Carl Schurz			Envoy Extraordinary and Minister Plenipotentiary	Mar 28, 1861	Jul 13, 1861	Left post, Dec 18, 1861	Abraham Lincoln (Republican)
17	Gustavus Koerner			Envoy Extraordinary and Minister Plenipotentiary	Jun 14, 1862	Nov 4, 1862	Left post, Jul 20, 1864	Abraham Lincoln (Republican)
18	John P. Hale			Envoy Extraordinary and Minister Plenipotentiary	Mar 10, 1865	Sep 30, 1865	Presented recall, Jul 29, 1869	Andrew Johnson (National Union/Democratic)
18	John P. Hale			Envoy Extraordinary and Minister Plenipotentiary	Mar 10, 1865	Sep 30, 1865	Presented recall, Jul 29, 1869	Ulysses S. Grant (Republican)
19	Daniel E. Sickles			Envoy Extraordinary and Minister Plenipotentiary	May 15, 1869	July 29, 1869	Presented new credentials on Feb 2, 1871, after change of government; transmitted recall by note Jan 31, 1874	Ulysses S. Grant (Republican)
20	Caleb Cushing			Envoy Extraordinary and Minister Plenipotentiary	Jan 6, 1874	May 30, 1874	Presented new credentials on Mar 10, 1875, after restoration of monarchy; left post, Apr 9, 1877	Ulysses S. Grant (Republican)
20	Caleb Cushing			Envoy Extraordinary and Minister Plenipotentiary	Jan 6, 1874	May 30, 1874	Presented new credentials on Mar 10, 1875, after restoration of monarchy; left post, Apr 9, 1877	Rutherford B. Hayes (Republican)
21	James Russell Lowell			Envoy Extraordinary and Minister Plenipotentiary	Jun 11, 1877	Aug 18, 1877	Presented recall, Mar 2, 1880	Rutherford B. Hayes (Republican)
22	Lucius Fairchild			Envoy Extraordinary and Minister Plenipotentiary	Jan 26, 1880	Mar 31, 1880	Presented recall, Dec 20, 1881	Rutherford B. Hayes (Republican)
22	Lucius Fairchild			Envoy Extraordinary and Minister Plenipotentiary	Jan 26, 1880	Mar 31, 1880	Presented recall, Dec 20, 1881	James A. Garfield (Republican)
22	Lucius Fairchild			Envoy Extraordinary and Minister Plenipotentiary	Jan 26, 1880	Mar 31, 1880	Presented recall, Dec 20, 1881	Chester A. Arthur (Republican)
23	Hannibal Hamlin			Envoy Extraordinary and Minister Plenipotentiary	Jun 30, 1881	Dec 20, 1881	Left post, Oct 17, 1882	Chester A. Arthur (Republican)
24	John W. Foster			Envoy Extraordinary and Minister Plenipotentiary	Feb 27, 1883	Jun 16, 1883	Presented recall, Aug 28, 1885	Chester A. Arthur (Republican)
24	John W. Foster			Envoy Extraordinary and Minister Plenipotentiary	Feb 27, 1883	Jun 16, 1883	Presented recall, Aug 28, 1885	Grover Cleveland (Democratic)
25	Jabez L.M. Curry			Envoy Extraordinary and Minister Plenipotentiary	Oct 7, 1885	Dec 22, 1885	Left post, Jul 5, 1888	Grover Cleveland (Democratic)
26	Perry Belmont			Envoy Extraordinary and Minister Plenipotentiary	Nov 17, 1888	Feb 13, 1889	Left post, May 1, 1889	Grover Cleveland (Democratic)
26	Perry Belmont			Envoy Extraordinary and Minister Plenipotentiary	Nov 17, 1888	Feb 13, 1889	Left post, May 1, 1889	Benjamin Harrison (Republican)
27	Thomas W. Palmer			Envoy Extraordinary and Minister Plenipotentiary	Mar 12, 1889	Jun 17, 1889	Left post, Apr 19, 1890	Benjamin Harrison (Republican)
28	E. Burd Grubb			Envoy Extraordinary and Minister Plenipotentiary	Sep 27, 1890	Dec 23, 1890	Left post, May 26, 1892	Benjamin Harrison (Republican)
29	A. Loudon Snowden			Envoy Extraordinary and Minister Plenipotentiary	Jul 22, 1892	Oct 6, 1892	Presented recall, Jun 3, 1893	Benjamin Harrison (Republican)
29	A. Loudon Snowden			Envoy Extraordinary and Minister Plenipotentiary	Jul 22, 1892	Oct 6, 1892	Presented recall, Jun 3, 1893	Grover Cleveland (Democratic)
30	Hannis Taylor			Envoy Extraordinary and Minister Plenipotentiary	Apr 8, 1893	Jul 1, 1893	Presented recall, Sep 13, 1897	Grover Cleveland (Democratic)
30	Hannis Taylor			Envoy Extraordinary and Minister Plenipotentiary	Apr 8, 1893	Jul 1, 1893	Presented recall, Sep 13, 1897	William McKinley (Republican)
31	Stewart L. Woodford			Envoy Extraordinary and Minister Plenipotentiary	Jun 19, 1897	Sep 13, 1897	Spain severed diplomatic relations with the U.S., Apr 21, 1898	William McKinley (Republican)
32	Bellamy Storer			Envoy Extraordinary and Minister Plenipotentiary	Apr 12, 1899	Jun 16, 1899	Presented recall, Dec 10, 1902	William McKinley (Republican)
32	Bellamy Storer			Envoy Extraordinary and Minister Plenipotentiary	Apr 12, 1899	Jun 16, 1899	Presented recall, Dec 10, 1902	Theodore Roosevelt (Republican)
33	Arthur S. Hardy			Envoy Extraordinary and Minister Plenipotentiary	Sep 26, 1902	Mar 2, 1903	Presented recall, May 1, 1905	Theodore Roosevelt (Republican)
34	William Miller Collier			Envoy Extraordinary and Minister Plenipotentiary	Mar 8, 1905	May 15, 1905	Superseded, Jun 9, 1909	Theodore Roosevelt (Republican)
34	William Miller Collier			Envoy Extraordinary and Minister Plenipotentiary	Mar 8, 1905	May 15, 1905	Superseded, Jun 9, 1909	William Howard Taft (Republican)
35	Henry Clay Ide			Envoy Extraordinary and Minister Plenipotentiary	Apr 1, 1909	Jun 9, 1909	Left post, Jul 8, 1913	William Howard Taft (Republican)
35	Henry Clay Ide			Envoy Extraordinary and Minister Plenipotentiary	Apr 1, 1909	Jun 9, 1909	Left post, Jul 8, 1913	Woodrow Wilson (Democratic)
36	Joseph E. Willard		Non-career appointee	Ambassador Extraordinary and Plenipotentiary	Sep 10, 1913	Oct 31, 1913	Left post, Jul 7, 1921	Woodrow Wilson (Democratic)
36	Joseph E. Willard		Non-career appointee	Ambassador Extraordinary and Plenipotentiary	Sep 10, 1913	Oct 31, 1913	Left post, Jul 7, 1921	Warren G. Harding (Republican)
37	Cyrus E. Woods		Non-career appointee	Ambassador Extraordinary and Plenipotentiary	Jun 24, 1921	Oct 14, 1921	Left post, Apr 18, 1923	Warren G. Harding (Republican)
38	Alexander P. Moore		Non-career appointee	Ambassador Extraordinary and Plenipotentiary	Mar 3, 1923	May 16, 1923	Left post, Dec 20, 1925	Warren G. Harding (Republican)
38	Alexander P. Moore		Non-career appointee	Ambassador Extraordinary and Plenipotentiary	Mar 3, 1923	May 16, 1923	Left post, Dec 20, 1925	Calvin Coolidge (Republican)
39	Ogden H. Hammond		Non-career appointee	Ambassador Extraordinary and Plenipotentiary	Dec 21, 1925	Mar 26, 1926	Left post, Oct 13, 1929	Calvin Coolidge (Republican)
39	Ogden H. Hammond		Non-career appointee	Ambassador Extraordinary and Plenipotentiary	Dec 21, 1925	Mar 26, 1926	Left post, Oct 13, 1929	Herbert Hoover (Republican)
40	Irwin B. Laughlin		Foreign Service officer	Ambassador Extraordinary and Plenipotentiary	Oct 16, 1929	Dec 24, 1929	Left post, Apr 12, 1933	Herbert Hoover (Republican)
40	Irwin B. Laughlin		Foreign Service officer	Ambassador Extraordinary and Plenipotentiary	Oct 16, 1929	Dec 24, 1929	Left post, Apr 12, 1933	Franklin D. Roosevelt (Democratic)
41	Claude G. Bowers		Non-career appointee	Ambassador Extraordinary and Plenipotentiary	Apr 6, 1933	Jun 1, 1933	Had final interview, Feb 2, 1939	Franklin D. Roosevelt (Democratic)
-	H. Freeman Matthews		Career Foreign Service Officer	Chargé d'Affaires ad interim	Apr 13, 1939			Franklin D. Roosevelt (Democratic)
42	Alexander W. Weddell		Foreign Service officer	Ambassador Extraordinary and Plenipotentiary	May 3, 1939	Jun 15, 1939	Left post, Feb 7, 1942	Franklin D. Roosevelt (Democratic)
43	Carlton J. H. Hayes		Non-career appointee	Ambassador Extraordinary and Plenipotentiary	May 2, 1942	Jun 9, 1942	Left Spain, Jan 18, 1945	Franklin D. Roosevelt (Democratic)
44	Norman Armour		Foreign Service officer	Ambassador Extraordinary and Plenipotentiary	Dec 15, 1944	Mar 24, 1945	Left post, Dec 1, 1945	Franklin D. Roosevelt (Democratic)
44	Norman Armour		Foreign Service officer	Ambassador Extraordinary and Plenipotentiary	Dec 15, 1944	Mar 24, 1945	Left post, Dec 1, 1945	Harry S. Truman (Democratic)
-	Philip W. Bonsal		Career Foreign Service Officer	Chargé d'Affaires ad interim	Mar 1946		Jun 1947	Harry S. Truman (Democratic)
-	Paul T. Culbertson		Career Foreign Service Officer	Chargé d'Affaires ad interim	Jun 1947		Dec 1950	Harry S. Truman (Democratic)
45	Stanton Griffis		Non-career appointee	Ambassador Extraordinary and Plenipotentiary	Feb 1, 1951	Mar 1, 1951	Relinquished charge, Jan 28, 1952	Harry S. Truman (Democratic)
46	Lincoln MacVeagh		Non-career appointee	Ambassador Extraordinary and Plenipotentiary	Feb 21, 1952	Mar 27, 1952	Left post, Mar 4, 1953	Harry S. Truman (Democratic)
46	Lincoln MacVeagh		Non-career appointee	Ambassador Extraordinary and Plenipotentiary	Feb 21, 1952	Mar 27, 1952	Left post, Mar 4, 1953	Dwight D. Eisenhower (Republican)
47	James Clement Dunn		Foreign Service officer	Ambassador Extraordinary and Plenipotentiary	Feb 27, 1953	Apr 9, 1953	Left post, Feb 9, 1955	Dwight D. Eisenhower (Republican)
48	John Lodge		Non-career appointee	Ambassador Extraordinary and Plenipotentiary	Jan 22, 1955	Mar 24, 1955	Left post, Apr 13, 1961	Dwight D. Eisenhower (Republican)
48	John Lodge		Non-career appointee	Ambassador Extraordinary and Plenipotentiary	Jan 22, 1955	Mar 24, 1955	Left post, Apr 13, 1961	John F. Kennedy (Democratic)
49	Anthony J. Drexel Biddle, Jr.		Non-career appointee	Ambassador Extraordinary and Plenipotentiary	Mar 29, 1961	May 25, 1961	Left Spain, Oct 12, 1961	John F. Kennedy (Democratic)
50	Robert F. Woodward		Foreign Service officer	Ambassador Extraordinary and Plenipotentiary	Apr 7, 1962	May 10, 1962	Left post, Feb 1, 1965	John F. Kennedy (Democratic)
50	Robert F. Woodward		Foreign Service officer	Ambassador Extraordinary and Plenipotentiary	Apr 7, 1962	May 10, 1962	Left post, Feb 1, 1965	Lyndon B. Johnson (Democratic)
51	Angier Biddle Duke		Non-career appointee	Ambassador Extraordinary and Plenipotentiary	Mar 11, 1965	Apr 1, 1965	Left post Mar 30, 1968	Lyndon B. Johnson (Democratic)
52	Robert F. Wagner		Non-career appointee	Ambassador Extraordinary and Plenipotentiary	Jun 24, 1968	Jul 4, 1968	Left post, Mar 7, 1969	Lyndon B. Johnson (Democratic)
52	Robert F. Wagner		Non-career appointee	Ambassador Extraordinary and Plenipotentiary	Jun 24, 1968	Jul 4, 1968	Left post, Mar 7, 1969	Richard Nixon (Republican)
53	Robert C. Hill		Non-career appointee	Ambassador Extraordinary and Plenipotentiary	May 1, 1969	Jun 12, 1969	Left post, Jun 12, 1972	Richard Nixon (Republican)
54	Horacio Rivero Jr.		Non-career appointee	Ambassador Extraordinary and Plenipotentiary	Sep 11, 1972	Oct 11, 1972	Left post, Nov 26, 1974	Richard Nixon (Republican)
54	Horacio Rivero Jr.		Non-career appointee	Ambassador Extraordinary and Plenipotentiary	Sep 11, 1972	Oct 11, 1972	Left post, Nov 26, 1974	Gerald Ford (Republican)
55	Wells Stabler		Foreign Service officer	Ambassador Extraordinary and Plenipotentiary	Feb 20, 1975	Mar 13, 1975	Left post, May 4, 1978	Gerald Ford (Republican)
55	Wells Stabler		Foreign Service officer	Ambassador Extraordinary and Plenipotentiary	Feb 20, 1975	Mar 13, 1975	Left post, May 4, 1978	Jimmy Carter (Democratic)
56	Terence A. Todman		Foreign Service officer	Ambassador Extraordinary and Plenipotentiary	May 25, 1978	Jul 20, 1978	Left post, Aug 8, 1983	Jimmy Carter (Democratic)
56	Terence A. Todman		Foreign Service officer	Ambassador Extraordinary and Plenipotentiary	May 25, 1978	Jul 20, 1978	Left post, Aug 8, 1983	Ronald Reagan (Republican)
57	Thomas Ostrom Enders		Foreign Service officer	Ambassador Extraordinary and Plenipotentiary	Aug 5, 1983	Sep 15, 1983	Left post Jul 6, 1986	Ronald Reagan (Republican)
58	Reginald Bartholomew		Foreign Service officer	Ambassador Extraordinary and Plenipotentiary	Aug 18, 1986	Sep 17, 1986	Left post, Mar 12, 1989	Ronald Reagan (Republican)
58	Reginald Bartholomew		Foreign Service officer	Ambassador Extraordinary and Plenipotentiary	Aug 18, 1986	Sep 17, 1986	Left post, Mar 12, 1989	George H. W. Bush (Republican)
59	Joseph Zappala		Non-career appointee	Ambassador Extraordinary and Plenipotentiary	Oct 10, 1989	Oct 16, 1989	Left post, Jun 4, 1992	George H. W. Bush (Republican)
60	Richard Goodwin Capen, Jr.		Non-career appointee	Ambassador Extraordinary and Plenipotentiary	Jun 15, 1992	Jul 8, 1992	Left post, Feb 17, 1993	George H. W. Bush (Republican)
60	Richard Goodwin Capen, Jr.		Non-career appointee	Ambassador Extraordinary and Plenipotentiary	Jun 15, 1992	Jul 8, 1992	Left post, Feb 17, 1993	Bill Clinton (Democratic)
61	Richard N. Gardner		Non-career appointee	Ambassador Extraordinary and Plenipotentiary	Sep 16, 1993	Nov 4, 1993	Left post, Jul 12, 1997	Bill Clinton (Democratic)
62	Edward L. Romero		Non-career appointee	Ambassador Extraordinary and Plenipotentiary	Apr 2, 1998	Jun 30, 1998	Left post, May 1, 2001	Bill Clinton (Democratic)
62	Edward L. Romero		Non-career appointee	Ambassador Extraordinary and Plenipotentiary	Apr 2, 1998	Jun 30, 1998	Left post, May 1, 2001	George W. Bush (Republican)
63	George L. Argyros		Non-career appointee	Ambassador Extraordinary and Plenipotentiary	Nov 21, 2001	Dec 13, 2001	Left post, Nov 21, 2004	George W. Bush (Republican)
64	Eduardo Aguirre		Non-career appointee	Ambassador Extraordinary and Plenipotentiary	Jun 21, 2005	Jun 29, 2005	Jan 20, 2009	George W. Bush (Republican)
65	Alan Solomont		Non-career appointee	Ambassador Extraordinary and Plenipotentiary	Dec 29, 2009	Jan 27, 2010	Left post Jun 28, 2013	Barack Obama (Democratic)
66	James Costos		Non-career appointee	Ambassador Extraordinary and Plenipotentiary	Aug 19, 2013	Sep 24, 2013	Left post Jan 18, 2017	Barack Obama (Democratic)
67	Richard Duke Buchan III		Non-career appointee	Ambassador Extraordinary and Plenipotentiary	Nov 20, 2017	Apr 3, 2018	Left post Jan 20, 2021	Donald Trump (Republican)
-	Conrad Tribble		Foreign Service officer	Chargé d'Affaires ad interim	Jan 20, 2021		Feb 2, 2022	Joe Biden (Democratic)
68	Julissa Reynoso Pantaleón		Non-career appointee	Ambassador Extraordinary and Plenipotentiary	Jan 7, 2022	Feb 2, 2022	July 12, 2024	Joe Biden (Democratic)
-	Rian Harker Harris		Foreign Service officer	Chargé d'Affaires ad interim	July 15, 2024		February 16, 2026	Joe Biden (Democratic)
69	Benjamin Leon		Non-career appointee	Ambassador Extraordinary and Plenipotentiary	December 18, 2025	February 18, 2026	Present	Donald Trump (Republican)

=== Other nominees ===
Name	Portrait	Type of appointee	Title	Appointment	Note
John Jay			Minister Plenipotentiary	Sep 29, 1779	Proceeded to post, but was not formally received at court; left post about May 20, 1782
James Bowdoin			Minister Plenipotentiary	Nov 22, 1804	Did not proceed to post
William T. Barry			Envoy Extraordinary and Minister Plenipotentiary	Apr 10, 1853	Took oath of office but died en route to post. Commissioned during a recess of the Senate
John C. Breckinridge			Envoy Extraordinary and Minister Plenipotentiary	Jan 16, 1855	Declined appointment
Cassius M. Clay			Envoy Extraordinary and Minister Plenipotentiary	Apr 14, 1861	Declined appointment
William S. Rosecrans			Envoy Extraordinary and Minister Plenipotentiary		Not commissioned; nomination tabled by the Senate
Henry S. Sanford			Envoy Extraordinary and Minister Plenipotentiary		Not commissioned; nomination tabled by the Senate
Joseph E. Willard		Non-career appointee	Envoy Extraordinary and Minister Plenipotentiary	Jul 28, 1913	Took oath of office, but did not proceed to post under this appointment
Ellis O. Briggs		Foreign Service officer	Ambassador Extraordinary and Plenipotentiary		Not commissioned; nomination withdrawn before the Senate acted upon it.
Frank E. McKinney		Non-career appointee	Ambassador Extraordinary and Plenipotentiary	May 11, 1968	Took oath of office, but did not proceed to post under this appointment
Peter M. Flanigan		Non-career appointee	Ambassador Extraordinary and Plenipotentiary		Not commissioned; nomination of Sep 17, 1974 was not acted upon the Senate

== See also ==
- Spain – United States relations
- Foreign relations of Spain
- Ambassadors of the United States
- List of ambassadors of Spain to the United States
