= Beneficial Corporation =

American financial services company

- Industry: Consumer finance
- Founded: 1914 as Beneficial Loan Society
- Defunct: 1998
- Fate: Purchased by Household International, Inc.
- Successor: HSBC Finance

Beneficial Corporation was one of the largest consumer finance companies in the United States, prior to its acquisition by Household International, Inc. in 1998.

Beneficial began as the Beneficial Loan Society in 1914 in Elizabeth, New Jersey, founded by “Colonel” Clarence Hodson (1868-1928). Norwegian immigrant Olaus Westby Caspersen (1896–1971) joined Beneficial in 1920. In 1929, the company was reorganized as Beneficial Finance Corporation by Olaus Caspersen who would spend 18 years as president of the company.

In 1960, the company entered the British market. In 1961, the company purchased Western Auto Supply Co., and in 1965 purchased Spiegel, Inc (later sold in 1981). In 1970, the company changed its name to Beneficial Corporation. In 1976, Beneficial began offering credit cards through its People's Bank & Trust Co. subsidiary in Delaware. In the same year, Finn M. W. Caspersen, the son of Olaus Caspersen, became chairman and chief executive. The company bought Parliament Leasing in 1977, and First Texas Financial Corp., a savings and loan, in 1978. In 1977, Beneficial entered the reinsurance business through its insurance subsidiaries, but this business caused significant financial losses in the 1980s. Beneficial downsized this business and emphasized its second mortgage business.

In 1998, the company was purchased by Household International, Inc., for about $8.25 billion in stock. Household International was in turn acquired by HSBC Group in 2003, and made a part of the HSBC Finance Company.
