= Kasper Sonne =

Danish-American artist

Kasper Sonne (born 1974 in Copenhagen, Denmark) is an internationally exhibited Danish artist living and working in Greenpoint, Brooklyn in New York. In 2000 he received a Bachelor of Arts degree from the Royal Danish Academy of Fine Arts. Sonne exhibits paintings, sculptures, and installations. His work has been exhibited in two solo shows in New York City, at the Charles Bank Gallery in 2010 and in Zero Emotional Content at The Hole on The Bowery. In 2013 he had a solo exhibition at the Henningsen Gallery in his native city of Copenhagen, Denmark, an exhibition that was reviewed by Art in America. Writing about his work has been featured in Artforum, Flash Art, and Modern Painters. Sonne's work is represented in the Franks-Suss collection.
