= Paul J. Taubman =

American billionaire banker

- Born: Paul Jeffrey Taubman; 1961 or 1962 (age 64–65)
- Occupation: Banker
- Known for: Founder, chairman and CEO, PJT Partners
- Spouse: Danielle Napolitan
- Children: 1

Paul Jeffrey Taubman (born 1961 or 1962) is an American billionaire banker, and the founder, chairman and chief executive officer of investment bank PJT Partners.

== Early life ==
Taubman earned a BS in economics from the Wharton School of the University of Pennsylvania and an MBA from Stanford University’s Graduate School of Business.

== Career ==
Taubman worked for Morgan Stanley for nearly 30 years. In 2014, he founded PJT Partners.

In 2015, he was paid US$164 million.

As of November 2024, the rising stock price of PJT Partners made Taubman a billionaire. He owns about 15% of PJT, worth US$1.1 billion.

== Personal life ==
He is married to Danielle Napolitan. He is an "avid" fan of the New York Yankees, and takes his son to games.
