= PJT Partners =

Global advisory-focused investment bank

PJT Partners, Inc.
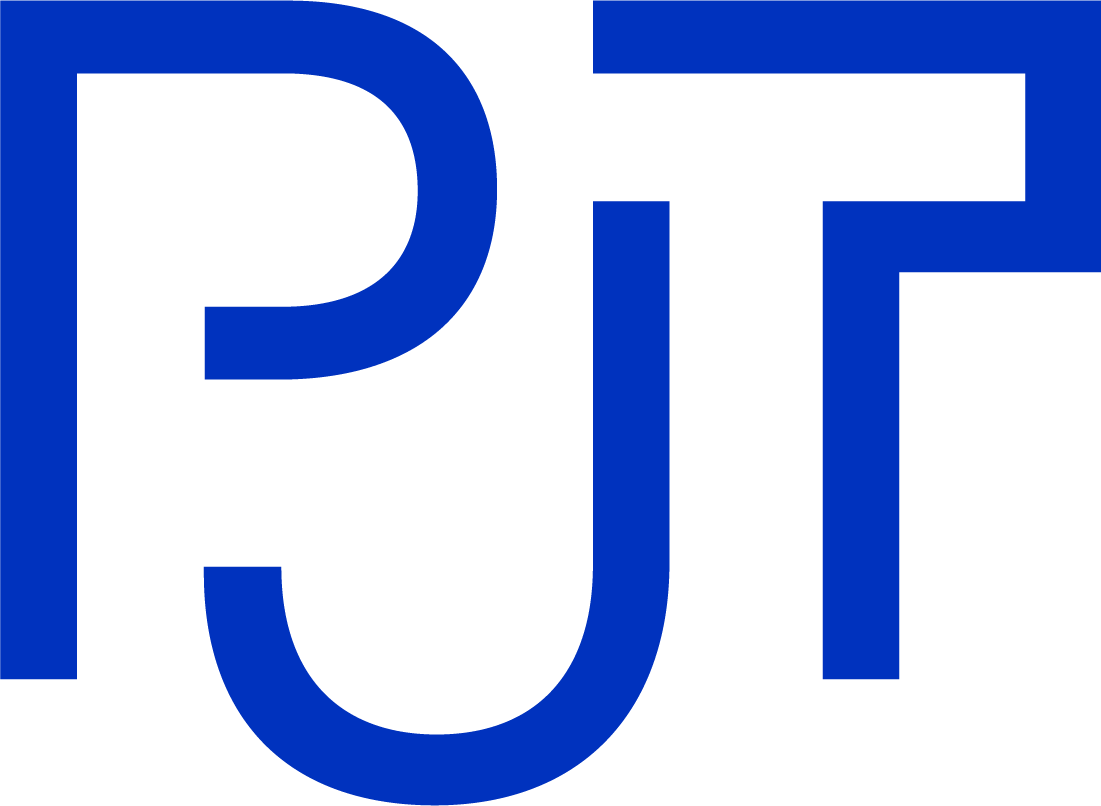

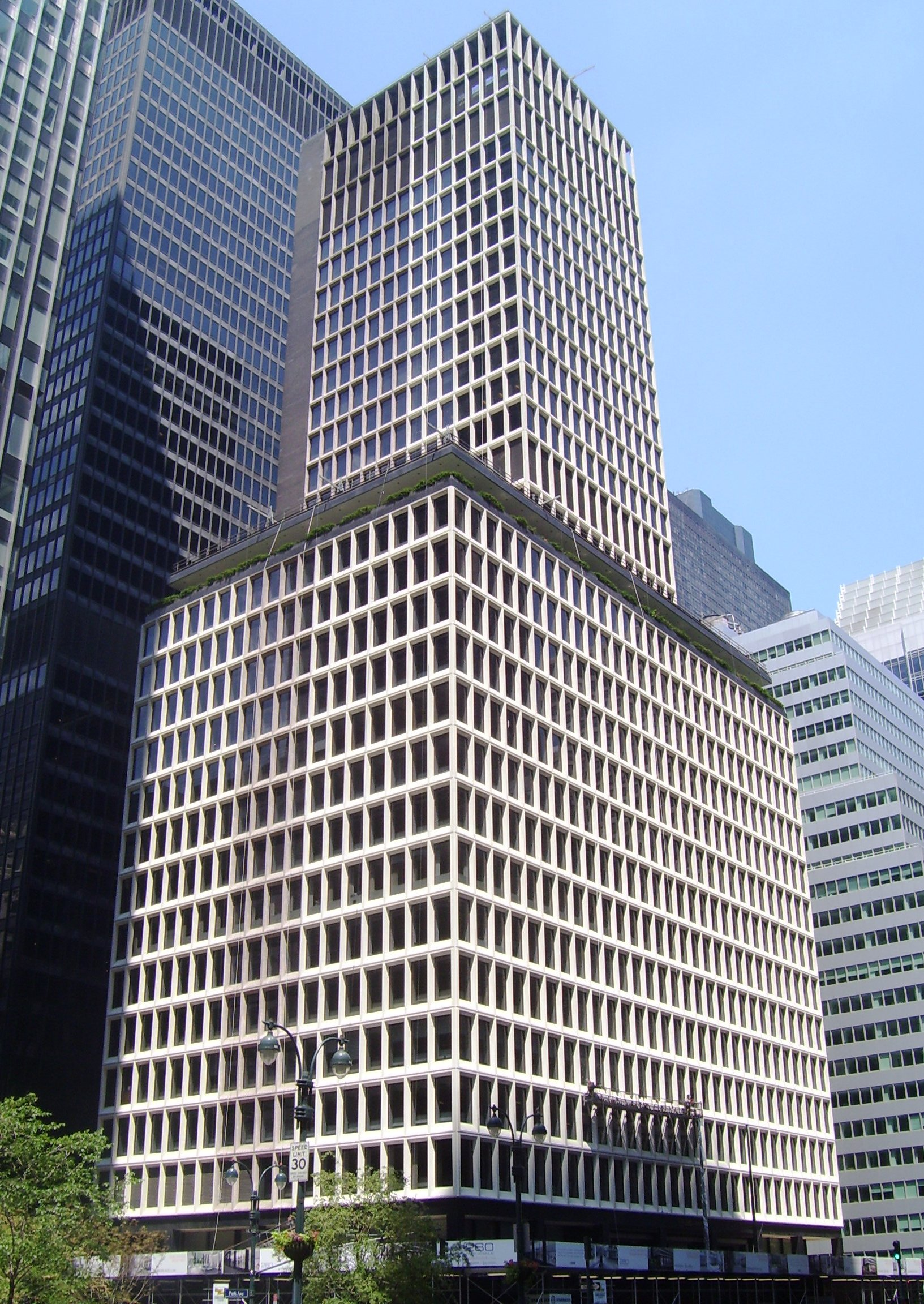
- Headquarters at 280 Park Avenue
- Type: Public Company
- Traded as: NYSE: PJT (Class A); Russell 2000 Component; S&P 600 Component
- Industry: Investment banking
- Founded: 2015
- Founder: Paul J. Taubman
- Headquarters: 280 Park Avenue, New York City, New York, 10017, United States
- Products: Investment banking, Mergers and Acquisitions, Restructuring, Private Equity
- Revenue: ▲US$1.71 billion (2025)
- Net income: ▲US$180 million (2025)
- Total assets: ▲US$1.84 billion (2025)
- Total equity: ▲US$308 million (2025)
- Number of employees: 1,143 (2024)
- Website: pjtpartners.com

PJT Partners, Inc. is a global advisory-focused investment bank, founded in October 2015 as part of The Blackstone Group's spin-off of its financial and strategic advisory services businesses.

PJT operates businesses across strategic advisory, strategic capital markets, restructuring, shareholder advisory and capital raising. The firm has advised on over $1 trillion in M&A transactions including AbbVie's $63 billion acquisition of Allergan, T-Mobile's $59 billion merger with Sprint, and Mylan's $50 billion merger with Pfizer subsidiary, Upjohn.

The firm is headquartered in New York City, with additional offices in Boston, Chicago, Dubai, Frankfurt, Hong Kong, Houston, London, Los Angeles, Madrid, Munich, Paris, Riyadh, San Francisco, Stockholm and Sydney, and employs more than 1,200 people.

== History and background ==
In 2015, PJT Partners, Inc. was created from a merger of the advisory arm of The Blackstone Group (which had operated for thirty years) and PJT Capital LP, a strategic advisory firm founded by Paul J. Taubman in 2013. PJT Partners' first day of trading was on October 1, 2015; on the same day, it became publicly traded, listing on the New York Stock Exchange (NYSE) under the symbol PJT. On its first day of trading, PJT had 330 employees and 46 partners.

Blackstone’s decision to do the spin-off was largely driven by the conflicts of interest that arose between Blackstone’s advisory services business and its investing businesses, including private equity, real estate investing and hedge funds.

In 2020, PJT achieved record revenue of $1.05 billion, more than double the revenue achieved five years prior. In 2020, the firm was rated "No. 3 Best Banking Firms for Business Outlook" by Vault. The firm is routinely cited as one of the best paying firms in the industry where average pay per head is ~$750,000 and has the highest pay for first year analysts.

Each year, the firm hires about 20 analysts.

== Leadership ==
Paul Jeffrey Taubman has been the chairman and chief executive of PJT Partners since its inception in 2015, and was the founder of its predecessor firm, PJT Capital LP, in 2013. He previously spent approximately 30 years at Morgan Stanley, where he was Co-President of Institutional Securities, which includes Morgan Stanley's investment banking, capital markets, and sales and trading businesses. Bloomberg News reported that Taubman was the second-highest-paid U.S. executive of 2015 (after Patrick Soon-Shiong), earning $164 million in awarded pay.

In 2015, before the firm began operations, Taubman hired a number of senior European bankers to lead PJT Partners' European operation. Soon after the firm was founded, former NBA Commissioner David J. Stern joined the firm as a senior adviser.

== Business and competitors ==
The firm is organized across three business lines: Strategic Advisory handles M&A, capital markets advisory, spin-offs, private placements, structured products and other transactions. Restructuring & Special Situations handles debtor advisory, creditor advisory, out-of-court solutions, distressed M&A and expert witness testimony. The Park Hill Group provides services for private equity, real estate, hedge funds and secondary advisory services. In 2018, PJT acquired CamberView, which advises clients on all aspects of corporate governance and shareholder activism, including contested situations, for $165 million. CamberView has since re-branded as PJT Camberview.

The firm's restructuring and special situations team offers services that include advising companies, governments, creditors, and financial sponsors on distressed M&A, recapitalizations, reorganizations, exchange offers, debt repurchases and capital raises across industries such as automotive, consumer products, energy, financial institutions, healthcare, real estate, gaming & leisure, manufacturing, media & communications, retail, shipping, steel and transportation. The firm's restructuring business has completed over $1.9 trillion worth of deals since inception and was ranked #1 globally and in the U.S. for both announced and completed restructuring deals for the first quarter of 2016.

The firm competes with all investment banks that provide strategic advisory services.
