= 2020 (disambiguation) =

2020 was a leap year starting on Wednesday of the Gregorian calendar.

2020, Twenty Twenty, 20:20 or 20/20 may also refer to:

- 20/20, normal visual acuity
- Twenty20, a form of cricket

== Films and television ==
- Twenty:20 (film), a 2008 Indian Malayalam-language film
- 20/20 (Canadian TV program), a documentary program that aired on CBC Television from 1962 to 1967
- 20/20 (New Zealand TV programme), a 1993–2014 news program
- 20/20 (American TV program), a news program broadcast on ABC since 1978
- 2020 (miniseries), a MediaCorp Channel News Asia (CNA) web series
- Twenty Twenty Television, a UK TV production company

== Music ==
=== Bands ===
- 20/20 (band), an American power pop band
- Twenty Twenty (band), a British pop-punk band

=== Albums ===
- 2020 (Bon Jovi album)
- 2020 (Molly Nilsson album)
- 2020 (Richard Dawson album)
- 2020 (Vandenberg album)
- 20:20 (album), a Ryan Adams box set planned for release in 2007 but never released
- 20:20, a compilation album released in 2020 by Planet Funk
- 20/20 (20/20 album)
- 20/20 (The Beach Boys album)
- 20/20 (Dilated Peoples album)
- 20/20 (George Benson album)
- 20/20 (Saga album) (2012)
- 20/20 (Spyro Gyra album)
- 20/20 (Trip Lee album)
- 20/20 (Knuckle Puck album)
- 20 (Twenty), an album by F.T. Island
- Twenty Twenty (Ronan Keating album), 2020
- Twenty Twenty – The Essential T Bone Burnett (2006)
- twentytwenty (Sara Niemietz album), a 2020 live album
- Twenty Twenty (Djo album)

=== Songs ===
- "20/20" (Lil Tjay song), 2020
- "20/20" (George Benson song), 1984
- "20/20", a song by Gaz Coombes from Matador
- "20/20", a song by Survivor from Survivor
- "20/20", a song by the Vaccines from English Graffiti

== Other uses ==
- 20/20 (spreadsheet software), an early multi-platform spreadsheet program
- 20Twenty (bank), a defunct online South African bank
- 2020 group, a faction of centre-left Conservative MPs in the United Kingdom
- MD 20/20, a brand of flavored fortified wine by Mogen David

== See also ==
- T20 (disambiguation)
- 2020 Vision (disambiguation)
- Australia 2020 Summit
- Cyberpunk 2020, a cyberpunk role-playing game
- DECSYSTEM-2020, a model of computer in the DECSYSTEM-20 line
- The 20/20 Experience, an album by Justin Timberlake
- 2020 Summer Olympics
