= 2020 Vision =

2020 Vision or Vision 2020 may refer to:

- 20/20 vision, the measure of visual acuity for normal vision

== Music ==
- 20/20 Vision (Anti-Flag album), 2020
- 20/20 Vision (Ronnie Milsap album), 1976
- 20:20 Vision (album), by ApologetiX, 2012
- 2020 Visions (album), by Stephen Dale Petit, 2020

== Strategic plans ==
- Croydon Vision 2020, for the London Borough of Croydon, England
- Wawasan 2020, for Malaysia
- India Vision 2020
- Joint Vision 2020, a U.S. defense doctrine
- Vision 2020 (Rwanda)
- Vision 2020 for Science, for Roper Mountain Science Center in South Carolina, U.S.
- Vision 2020: New York City Comprehensive Waterfront Plan, U.S.

== Other uses ==
- "20/20 Vision" (The Twilight Zone), an episode of the TV series
- 2020 Vision Campaign, a former campaign for a nuclear-weapon-free world
- 2020 Visions, a science fiction comic book and limited series by Jamie Delano

== See also ==
- 2020 (disambiguation)
- "Kanye 2020 Vision", a slogan used in the Kanye West 2020 presidential campaign
