= Paul Wolfowitz =

American politician and diplomat (born 1943)

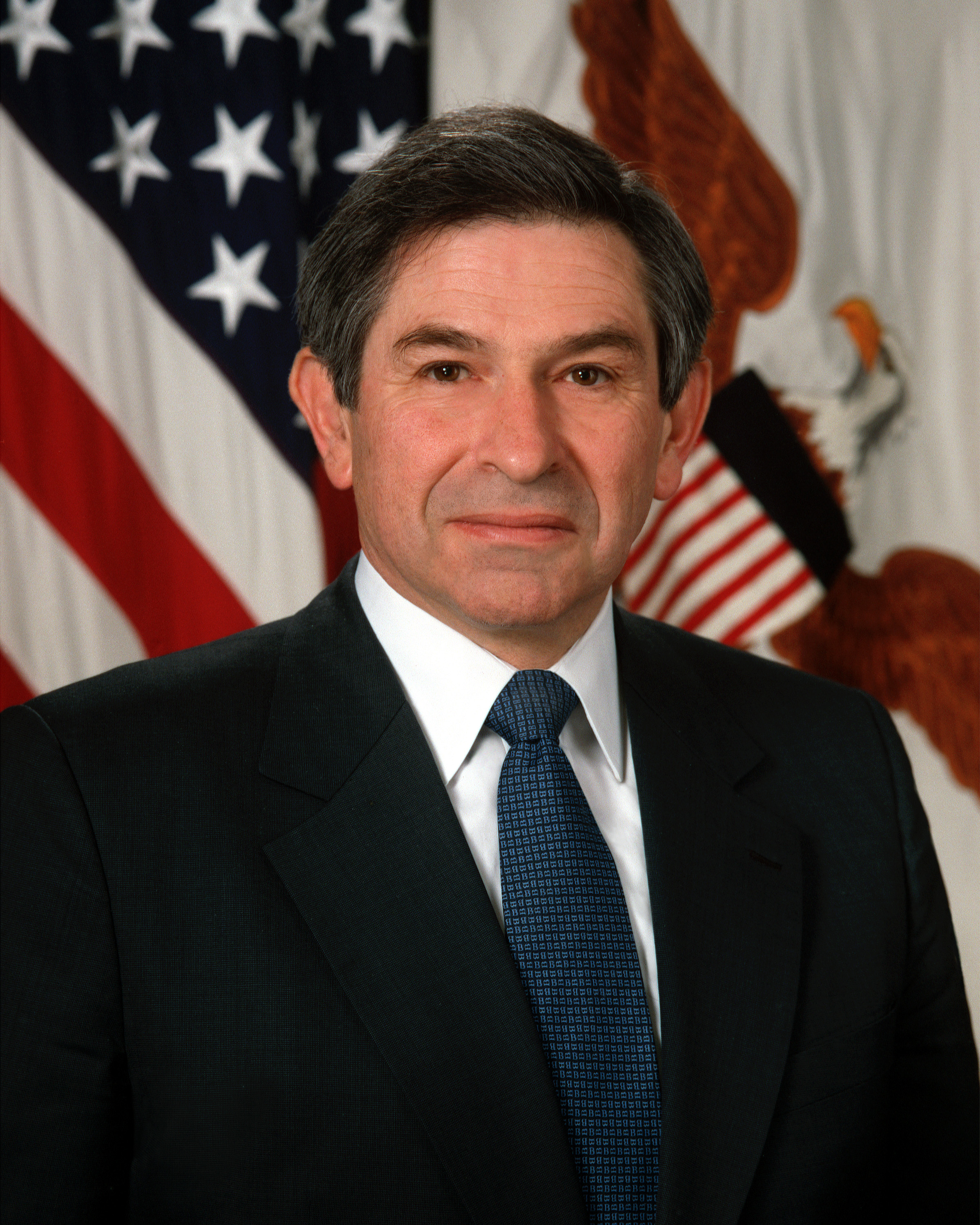
- Official portrait, 2001

10th President of the World Bank Group
- In office June 1, 2005 – June 30, 2007
- Preceded by: James Wolfensohn
- Succeeded by: Robert Zoellick

28th United States Deputy Secretary of Defense
- In office March 2, 2001 – June 1, 2005
- President: George W. Bush
- Secretary: Donald Rumsfeld
- Preceded by: Rudy de Leon
- Succeeded by: Gordon England

5th Dean of the Paul H. Nitze School of Advanced International Studies
- In office 1994–2001
- Preceded by: George R. Packard
- Succeeded by: Jessica Einhorn

Under Secretary of Defense for Policy
- In office May 15, 1989 – January 19, 1993
- President: George H. W. Bush
- Preceded by: Fred Iklé
- Succeeded by: Frank G. Wisner

United States Ambassador to Indonesia
- In office April 11, 1986 – May 12, 1989
- President: Ronald Reagan; George H. W. Bush
- Preceded by: John H. Holdridge
- Succeeded by: John Cameron Monjo

16th Assistant Secretary of State for East Asian and Pacific Affairs
- In office December 22, 1982 – March 12, 1986
- President: Ronald Reagan
- Preceded by: John H. Holdridge
- Succeeded by: Gaston J. Sigur Jr.

12th Director of Policy Planning
- In office February 13, 1981 – December 22, 1982
- President: Ronald Reagan
- Preceded by: Anthony Lake
- Succeeded by: Stephen W. Bosworth

Personal details
- Born: December 22, 1943 (age 82) New York City, U.S.
- Party: Democratic (before 1981); Republican (1981–present)
- Spouse: Clare Selgin (m. 1968; div. 2002)
- Children: 3
- Education: Cornell University (BA); University of Chicago (MA, PhD)
- Website: AEI website

Paul Dundes Wolfowitz (born December 22, 1943) is an American political scientist and diplomat who served as the 10th President of the World Bank, U.S. Deputy Secretary of Defense, U.S. Ambassador to Indonesia, and dean of the School of Advanced International Studies (SAIS) at Johns Hopkins University.

Having proposed a plan to invade Iraq in 2001, Wolfowitz was an early advocate of the Iraq War and has widely been described as an "architect" of the war. Wolfowitz later disputed that description, arguing that the invasion and subsequent occupation had not been conducted according to his preferred approach. He also acknowledged significant mistakes in the handling of postwar Iraq, including the failure to anticipate an insurgency. He is a leading neoconservative.

Wolfowitz served as president of the World Bank from June 2005 to June 2007, during which he emphasized economic development in Africa, debt relief, and efforts to combat corruption. His presidency ended following a controversy over his involvement in compensation arrangements for Shaha Riza, a World Bank employee with whom he was in a relationship. On May 17, 2007, the Bank's Board of Executive Directors accepted Wolfowitz's assurance that he had acted ethically and in good faith, while acknowledging mistakes in the handling of the matter. Wolfowitz resigned effective June 30, 2007, becoming the first World Bank president to resign amid a scandal.

== Early life ==
The second child of Jacob Wolfowitz (b. Warsaw; 1910–1981) and Lillian Dundes, Paul Wolfowitz was born in Brownsville, Brooklyn, New York, into a Polish Jewish immigrant family, and grew up mainly in Ithaca, New York, where his father was a professor of statistical theory at Cornell University. While Jacob Wolfowitz fled Poland after World War I, the rest of his family perished in the Holocaust.

In the mid-1960s, while Paul was an undergraduate student at Cornell residing at the Cornell Branch of the Telluride Association, he met Clare Selgin, who later became an anthropologist. They married in 1968, had three children and lived in Chevy Chase, Maryland. They separated in 1999, and, according to some sources, became legally separated in 2001 and divorced in 2002.

In late 1999, Wolfowitz began dating Shaha Riza. Their relationship led to controversy later, during his presidency of the World Bank Group.

Wolfowitz speaks five languages in addition to English: Arabic, French, German, Hebrew, and Indonesian. He was reportedly the model for a minor character named Philip Gorman in Saul Bellow's 2000 book Ravelstein.

=== Education ===
Wolfowitz entered Cornell University in 1961. He lived in the Telluride House in 1962 and 1963, while philosophy professor Allan Bloom served as a faculty mentor living in the house. In August 1963, he and his mother participated in the civil-rights march on Washington organized by A. Philip Randolph. Wolfowitz was a member of the Quill and Dagger society. Wolfowitz graduated in 1965 with a B.A. in mathematics. Against his father's wishes, Wolfowitz decided to go to graduate school to study political science. Wolfowitz would later say that "one of the things that ultimately led me to leave mathematics and go into political science was thinking I could prevent nuclear war."

In 1972, Wolfowitz received a Ph.D. in political science from the University of Chicago, writing his doctoral dissertation on Nuclear Proliferation in the Middle East: The Politics and Economics of Proposals for Nuclear Desalting. At the University of Chicago, Wolfowitz took two courses with Leo Strauss. He completed his dissertation under Albert Wohlstetter. Wohlstetter became Wolfowitz's "mentor". In the words of Wolfowitz's future colleague Richard Perle: "Paul thinks the way Albert thinks." In the summer of 1969, Wohlstetter arranged for Wolfowitz, Perle and Peter Wilson to join the Committee to Maintain a Prudent Defense Policy which was set up by Cold War architects Paul Nitze and Dean Acheson.

While finishing his dissertation, Wolfowitz taught in the department of political science at Yale University from 1970 to 1972; one of his students was future colleague Scooter Libby.

== Career ==
=== Arms Control and Disarmament Agency ===
In the 1970s, Wolfowitz and Perle served as aides to proto-neoconservative Democratic Senator Henry M. Jackson. A Cold War liberal, Jackson supported higher military spending and a hard line against the Soviet Union alongside more traditional Democratic causes, such as social welfare programs, civil rights, and labor unions.

In 1973, U.S. President Richard Nixon, under pressure from Senator Jackson, dismissed the head of the Arms Control and Disarmament Agency (ACDA) and replaced him with Fred Ikle. Ikle brought in a new team that included Wolfowitz. While at ACDA, Wolfowitz wrote research papers and drafted testimony, as he had previously done at the Committee to Maintain a Prudent Defense Policy. He traveled with Ikle to strategic arms limitations talks in Paris and other European cities. He also helped dissuade South Korea from reprocessing plutonium that could be diverted into a clandestine weapons program.

Under President Gerald Ford, the American intelligence agencies came under attack over their annually published National Intelligence Estimate. According to James Mann, "The underlying issue was whether the C.I.A. and other agencies were underestimating the threat from the Soviet Union, either by intentionally tailoring intelligence to support Kissinger's policy of détente or by simply failing to give enough weight to darker interpretations of Soviet intentions." Attempting to counter these claims, Director of Central Intelligence George H. W. Bush formed a committee of anti-Communist experts, headed by Richard Pipes, to reassess the raw data. Based on the recommendation of Perle, Pipes picked Wolfowitz for this committee, which was later called Team B.

The team's 1976 report, which was leaked to the press, stated that "all the evidence points to an undeviating Soviet commitment to what is euphemistically called the 'worldwide triumph of socialism,' but in fact connotes global Soviet hegemony", highlighting a number of key areas where they believed the government's intelligence analysts had failed. According to Jack Davis, Wolfowitz observed later:

The B-Team demonstrated that it was possible to construct a sharply different view of Soviet motivation from the consensus view of the [intelligence] analysts and one that provided a much closer fit to the Soviets' observed behavior (and also provided a much better forecast of subsequent behavior up to and through the invasion of Afghanistan). The formal presentation of the competing views in a session out at [CIA headquarters in] Langley also made clear that the enormous experience and expertise of the B-Team as a group were formidable."

Team B's conclusions have faced criticism. They have been called "worst-case analysis", ignoring the "political, demographic, and economic rot" already eating away at the Soviet system. Wolfowitz reportedly had a central role in Team B, mostly focused on analyzing the role that medium-range missiles played in Soviet military strategy.

In 2004, United Press International reported an allegation that Wolfowitz had been investigated in 1978 over a suspected disclosure of a classified document concerning a proposed American arms sale to an Arab government. According to Green, the document had allegedly been provided to an Israeli government official through an intermediary associated with AIPAC. The report stated that the investigation was subsequently dropped.

=== Deputy Assistant Secretary of Defense for Regional Programs ===
In 1977, during the Carter administration, Wolfowitz moved to the Pentagon. He was U.S. Deputy Assistant Secretary of Defense for Regional Programs for the US Defense Department, under US Secretary of Defense Harold Brown.

In 1980, Wolfowitz resigned from the Pentagon and became a visiting professor at the Paul H. Nitze School of Advanced International Studies (SAIS) at Johns Hopkins University. Shortly after, he joined the Republican Party. According to The Washington Post: "He said it was not he who changed his political philosophy so much as the Democratic Party, which abandoned the hard-headed internationalism of Harry Truman, Kennedy and Jackson."

=== State Department Director of Policy Planning ===
Following the 1980 election of President Ronald Reagan, the new National Security Advisor Richard V. Allen formed the administration's foreign policy advisory team. Allen initially rejected Wolfowitz's appointment but following discussions, instigated by former colleague John Lehman, Allen offered Wolfowitz the position of Director of Policy Planning at the Department of State.

President Reagan's foreign policy was heavily influenced by the Kirkpatrick Doctrine, as outlined in a 1979 article in Commentary by Jeane Kirkpatrick entitled "Dictatorships and Double Standards".

Although most governments in the world are, as they always have been, autocracies of one kind or another, no idea holds greater sway in the mind of educated Americans than the belief that it is possible to democratize governments, anytime, anywhere, under any circumstances ... (But) decades, if not centuries, are normally required for people to acquire the necessary disciplines and habits.

Wolfowitz broke from this official line by denouncing Saddam Hussein of Iraq at a time when Donald Rumsfeld was offering the dictator support in his conflict with Iran. James Mann points out: "quite a few neo-conservatives, like Wolfowitz, believed strongly in democratic ideals; they had taken from the philosopher Leo Strauss the notion that there is a moral duty to oppose a leader who is a 'tyrant.'" Other areas where Wolfowitz disagreed with the administration was in his opposition to attempts to open up dialogue with the Palestine Liberation Organization (PLO) and to the sale of Airborne Warning and Control System (AWACS) aircraft to Saudi Arabia. "In both instances," according to Mann, "Wolfowitz demonstrated himself to be one of the strongest supporters of Israel in the Reagan administration."

Mann stresses: "It was on China that Wolfowitz launched his boldest challenge to the established order." After Nixon and Kissinger had gone to China in the early 1970s, U.S. policy was to make concessions to China as an essential Cold War ally. The Chinese were now pushing for the U.S. to end arms sales to Taiwan, and Wolfowitz used the Chinese incentive as an opportunity to undermine Kissinger's foreign policy toward China. Instead, Wolfowitz advocated a unilateralist policy, claiming that the U.S. did not need China's assistance but that the Chinese needed the U.S. to protect them against the far more-likely prospect of a Soviet invasion of China. Wolfowitz soon came into conflict with Secretary of State Alexander Haig, who had been Kissinger's assistant at the time of the visits to China. On March 30, 1982, The New York Times predicted that "Paul D. Wolfowitz, the director of policy planning ... will be replaced", because "Mr. Haig found Mr. Wolfowitz too theoretical." Instead, on June 25, 1982, Haig was replaced by George Shultz as U.S. Secretary of State, and Wolfowitz was promoted.

=== State Department Assistant Secretary for East Asian and Pacific Affairs ===
In 1982, Secretary of State Shultz appointed Wolfowitz as Assistant Secretary of State for East Asian and Pacific Affairs.

Jeane Kirkpatrick, on a visit to the Philippines, was welcomed by the dictator Ferdinand Marcos who quoted heavily from her 1979 Commentary article Dictatorships and Double Standards; although Kirkpatrick had been forced to speak out in favor of democracy, the article continued to influence Reagan's policy toward Marcos. Following the assassination of Philippine opposition leader Benigno Aquino Jr. in 1983, many within the Reagan administration including the President himself began to fear that the Philippines could fall to the communists and the US military would lose its strongholds at Clark Air Force Base and Subic Bay Naval Station. Wolfowitz tried to change the administration's policy, stating in an April 15, 1985, article in The Wall Street Journal that "The best antidote to Communism is democracy." Wolfowitz and his assistant Lewis Libby made trips to Manila where they called for democratic reforms and met with non-communist opposition leaders.

Mann points out that "the Reagan administration's decision to support democratic government in the Philippines had been hesitant, messy, crisis-driven and skewed by the desire to do what was necessary to protect the American military installations." Following massive street protests, Marcos fled the country on a U.S. Air Force plane and the U.S. recognized the government of Corazón Aquino.

=== Ambassador to the Republic of Indonesia ===
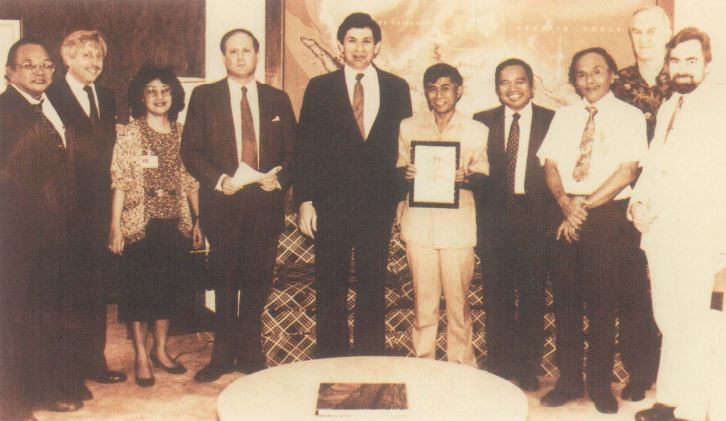
Paul Wolfowitz (center) during his tenure as United States Ambassador to the Republic of Indonesia in 1987

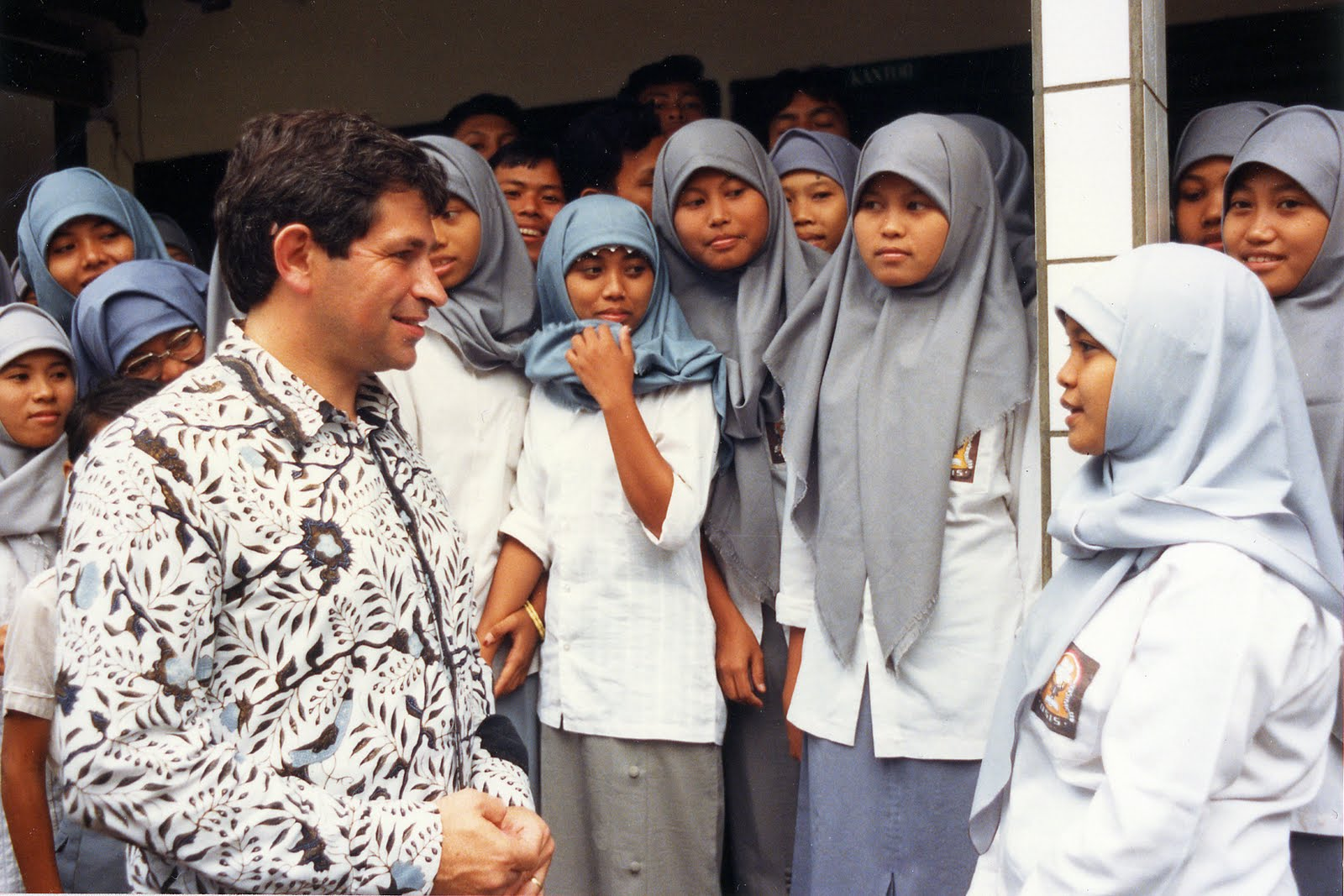
U.S. Ambassador to Indonesia Paul Wolfowitz, wearing local Indonesian traditional Batik Shirt, during a visit to local School

From 1986 to 1989, during the military-backed government of President Suharto, Wolfowitz was the U.S. ambassador to the Republic of Indonesia.

According to Peter J. Boyer,

Wolfowitz's appointment to Indonesia was not an immediately obvious match. He was a Jew representing America in the largest Muslim republic in the world, an advocate of democracy in Suharto's dictatorship. But Wolfowitz's tenure as Ambassador was a notable success, largely because, in essence, he went native. With tutoring help from his driver, he learned the language, and hurled himself into the culture. He attended academic seminars, climbed volcanoes, and toured the neighborhoods of Jakarta.

Wolfowitz's tenure as ambassador was characterized by efforts to encourage political and economic reform in Indonesia. According to The Washington Post, Indonesian and American colleagues described his approach as a quiet pursuit of reform. Dewi Fortuna Anwar, who later served as a foreign policy adviser to President B. J. Habibie, described Wolfowitz as a competent and popular ambassador but criticized what she regarded as his failure to intervene more directly on human rights and corruption. Officials involved in USAID programs during his tenure offered a different assessment, discussing his personal interest in development, including health care, agriculture, and private-sector expansion. They also reported that he canceled food assistance to the Indonesian government because of concerns that businesses connected to Suharto's family would benefit indirectly.

In "The Tragedy of Suharto", published in May 1998, in The Wall Street Journal, Wolfowitz states:

Although it is fashionable to blame all of Asia's present problems on corruption and the failure of Asian values, it is at bottom a case of a bubble bursting, of too many imprudent lenders chasing too many incautious borrowers. But the greed of Mr. Suharto's children ensured that their father would take the lion's share of the blame for Indonesia's financial collapse. The Suharto children's favored position became a major obstacle to the measures needed to restore economic confidence. Worst of all, they ensured that the economic crisis would be a political crisis as well. That he allowed this, and that he amassed such wealth himself, is all the more mysterious since he lived a relatively modest life.

After the 2002 Bali bombing, on October 18, 2002, then Deputy Secretary of Defense Wolfowitz observed that "the reason the terrorists are successful in Indonesia is because the Suharto regime fell and the methods that were used to suppress them are gone."

=== Undersecretary of Defense for Policy ===
Flag of the Under Secretary of Defense for Policy

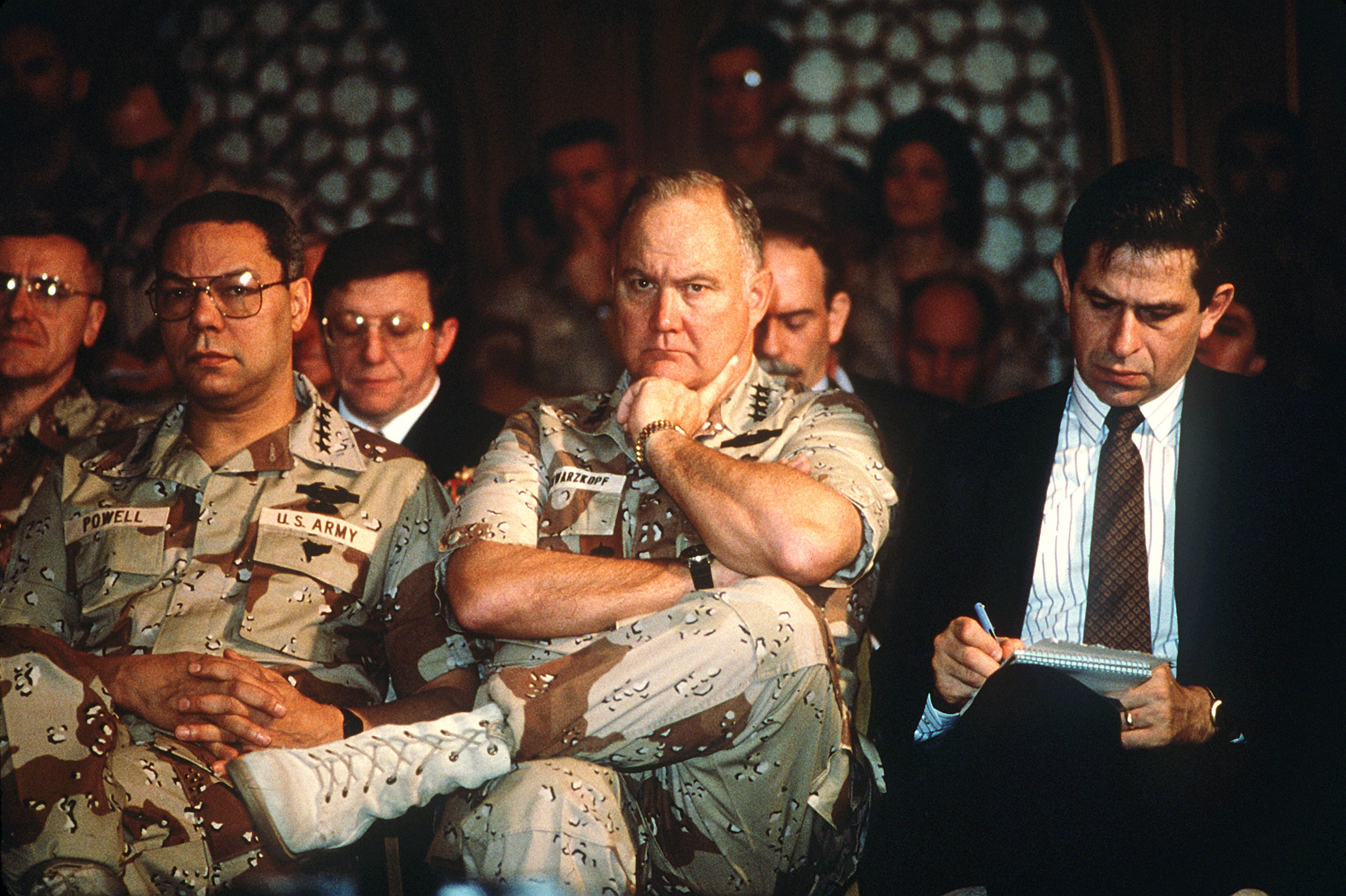
Gen. Colin Powell, Gen. Norman Schwarzkopf, and Under Sec. Wolfowitz listen as Defense Sec. Dick Cheney briefs reporters during the Gulf War in February 1991.

From 1989 to 1993, Wolfowitz served in the administration of George H. W. Bush as Under Secretary of Defense for Policy, under then U.S. Secretary of Defense Dick Cheney. During the 1991 Persian Gulf War, Wolfowitz's team coordinated and reviewed military strategy, raising $50 billion in allied financial support for the operation. Wolfowitz was present with Cheney, Colin Powell and others, on February 27, 1991, at the meeting with the President where it was decided that the troops should be demobilized.

On February 25, 1998, Wolfowitz testified before a congressional committee that he thought that "the best opportunity to overthrow Saddam was, unfortunately, lost in the month right after the war." Wolfowitz added that he was horrified in March as "Saddam Hussein flew helicopters that slaughtered the people in the south and in the north who were rising up against him, while American fighter pilots flew overhead, desperately eager to shoot down those helicopters, and not allowed to do so." During that hearing, he also stated: "Some people might say—and I think I would sympathise with this view—that perhaps if we had delayed the ceasefire by a few more days, we might have got rid of Saddam Hussein."

Following the 1991 Persian Gulf War, Wolfowitz supervised the preparation of the Defense Planning Guidance for the post-Cold War period, with his deputy I. Lewis "Scooter" Libby playing a leading role in its drafting. An early draft, leaked to The New York Times in March 1992 before it had received final approval, attracted controversy for its emphasis on maintaining American military superiority and preventing the emergence of a rival great power. The leaked document became widely known as the "Wolfowitz Doctrine". Military strategist Andrew Bacevich later described the draft as follows:

Before this classified document was fully vetted by the White House, it was leaked to The New York Times, which made it front-page news. The draft DPG announced that it had become the "first objective" of U.S. policy "to prevent the re-emergence of a new rival." With an eye toward "deterring potential competitors from even aspiring to a larger regional or global role," the United States would maintain unquestioned military superiority and, if necessary, employ force unilaterally. As window dressing, allies might be nice, but the United States no longer considered them necessary.

At that time, the official administration line was "containment", and the contents of Wolfowitz's plan calling for "preemption" and "unilateralism" was opposed by Chairman of the Joint Chiefs of Staff Colin Powell and President Bush. Defense Secretary Cheney produced a revised plan released in 1992. Many of the ideas in the Wolfowitz Doctrine later became part of the Bush Doctrine. He left the government after the 1992 election.

=== Johns Hopkins University ===
From 1994 to 2001, Wolfowitz served as Professor of International Relations and Dean of the Paul H. Nitze School of Advanced International Studies (SAIS) at Johns Hopkins University. He was instrumental in adding more than $75 million to the university's endowment, developing an international finance concentration as part of the curriculum, and combining the various Asian studies programs into one department. He also advised Bob Dole on foreign policy during his 1996 U.S. presidential election campaign, which was managed by Donald Rumsfeld.

According to Kampfner, "Wolfowitz used his perch at the Johns Hopkins School of Advanced International Studies as a test-bed for a new conservative world vision." Wolfowitz was associated with the Project for the New American Century (PNAC); he signed both the PNAC's June 3, 1997 "Statement of Principles", and its January 26, 1998, open letter to President Bill Clinton.

In February 1998, Wolfowitz testified before a congressional hearing, stating that the current administration lacked the sense of purpose to "liberate ourselves, our friends and allies in the region, and the Iraqi people themselves from the menace of Saddam Hussein."

In September 2000, the PNAC produced a 90-page report entitled Rebuilding America's Defenses: Strategies, Forces and Resources for a New Century, advocating the redeployment of U.S. troops in permanent bases in strategic locations throughout the world where they can be ready to act to protect U.S. interests abroad. During the 2000 U.S. presidential election campaign, Wolfowitz served as a foreign policy advisor to George W. Bush as part of the group led by Condoleezza Rice calling itself The Vulcans.

=== Deputy Secretary of Defense ===
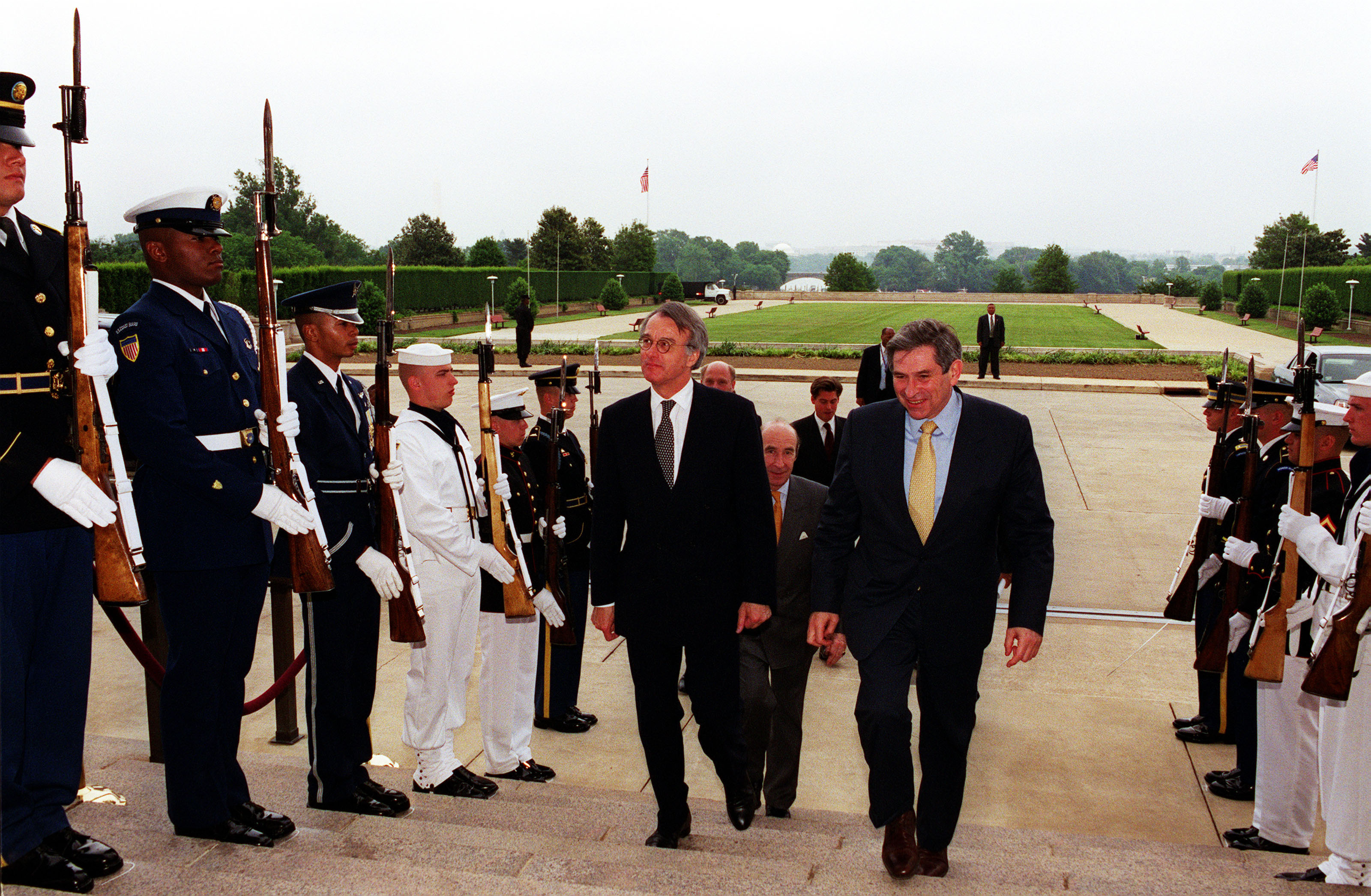
Wolfowitz and Dutch Foreign Minister Jozias van Aartsen, 2001

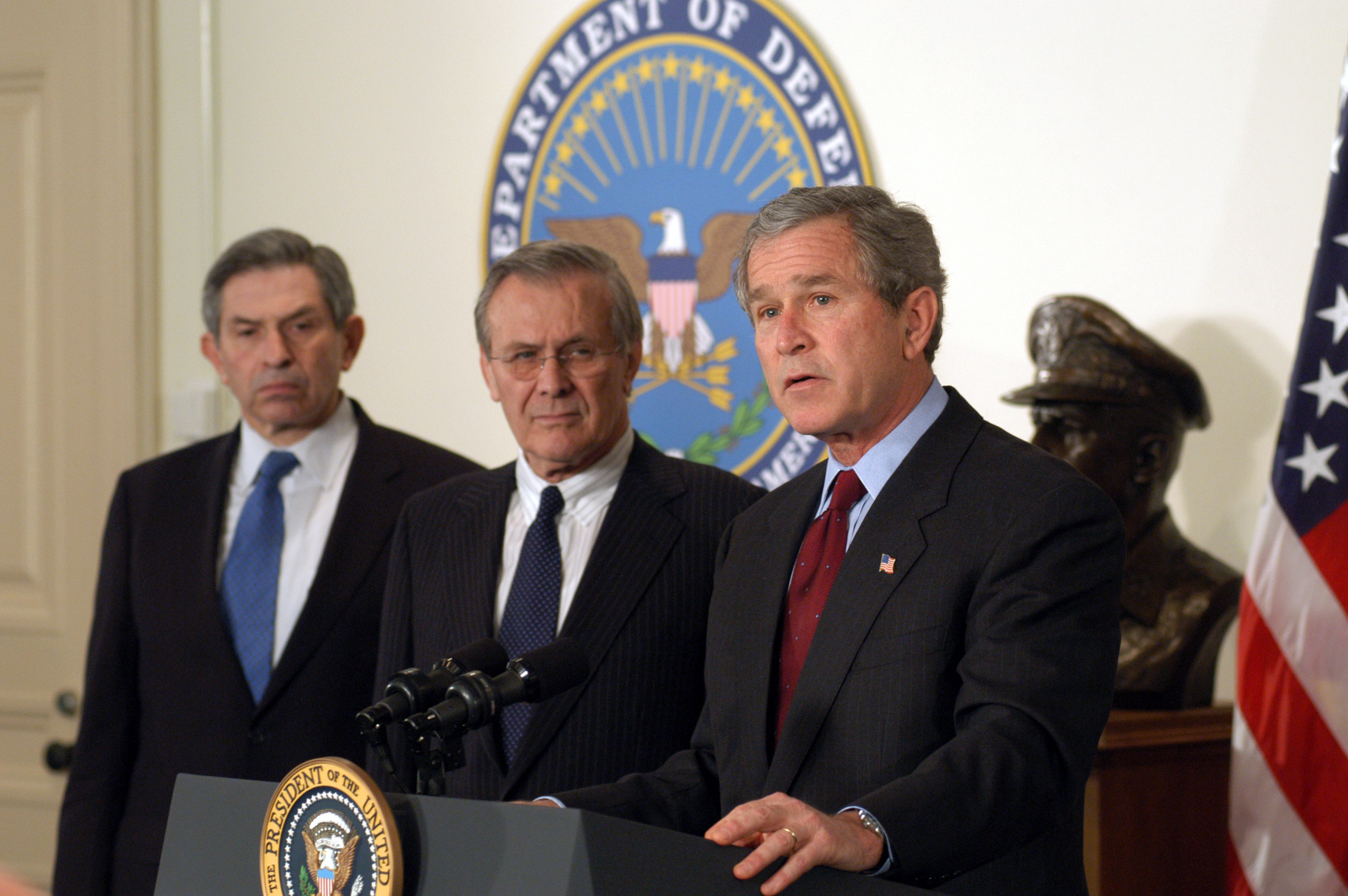
President George W. Bush, Defense Secretary Donald Rumsfeld, and Deputy Secretary Wolfowitz in March 2003

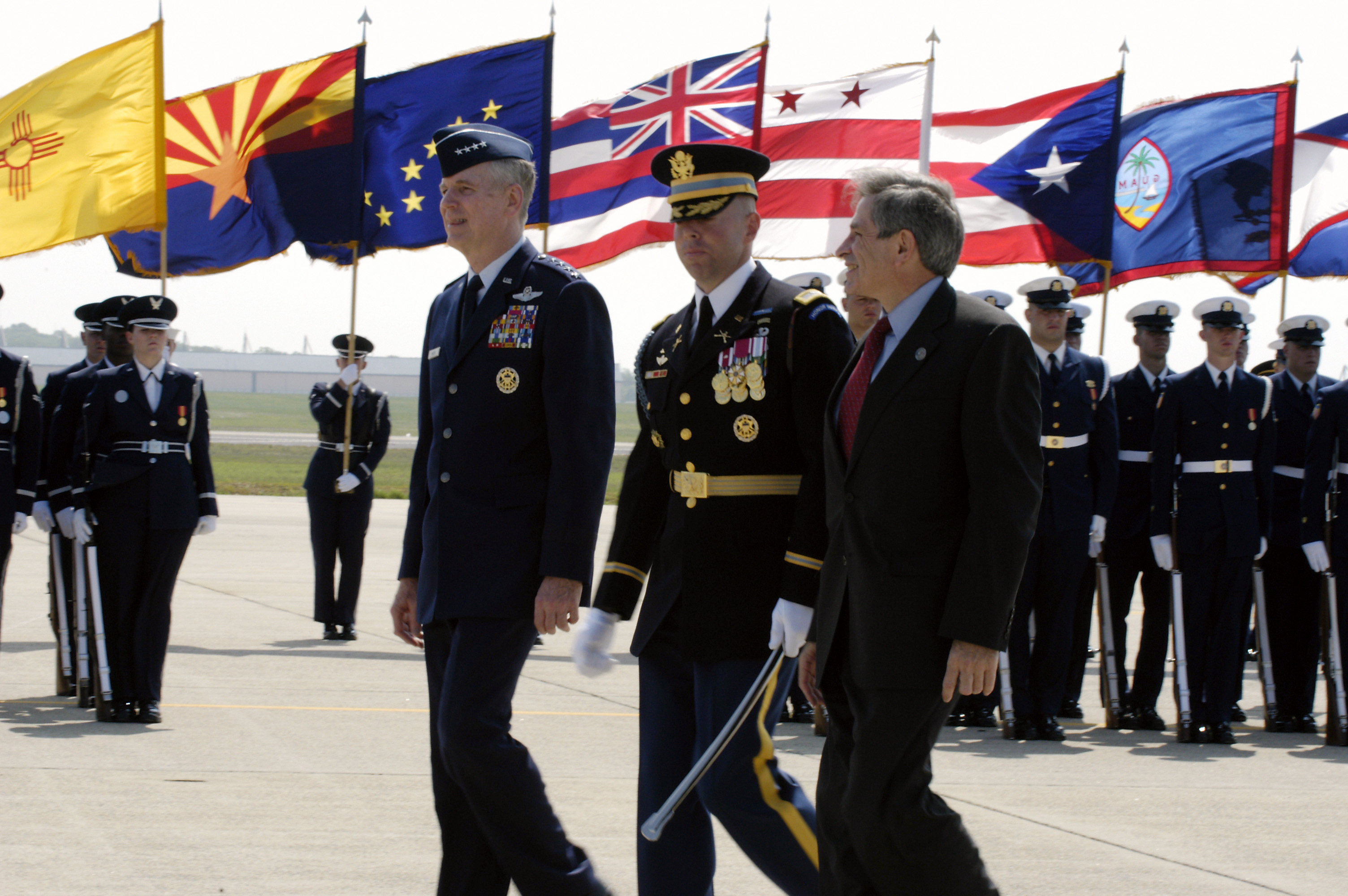
Wolfowitz with Chairman of The Joint Chiefs of Staff General Richard B. Myers at Andrews Air Force Base, May 14, 2004

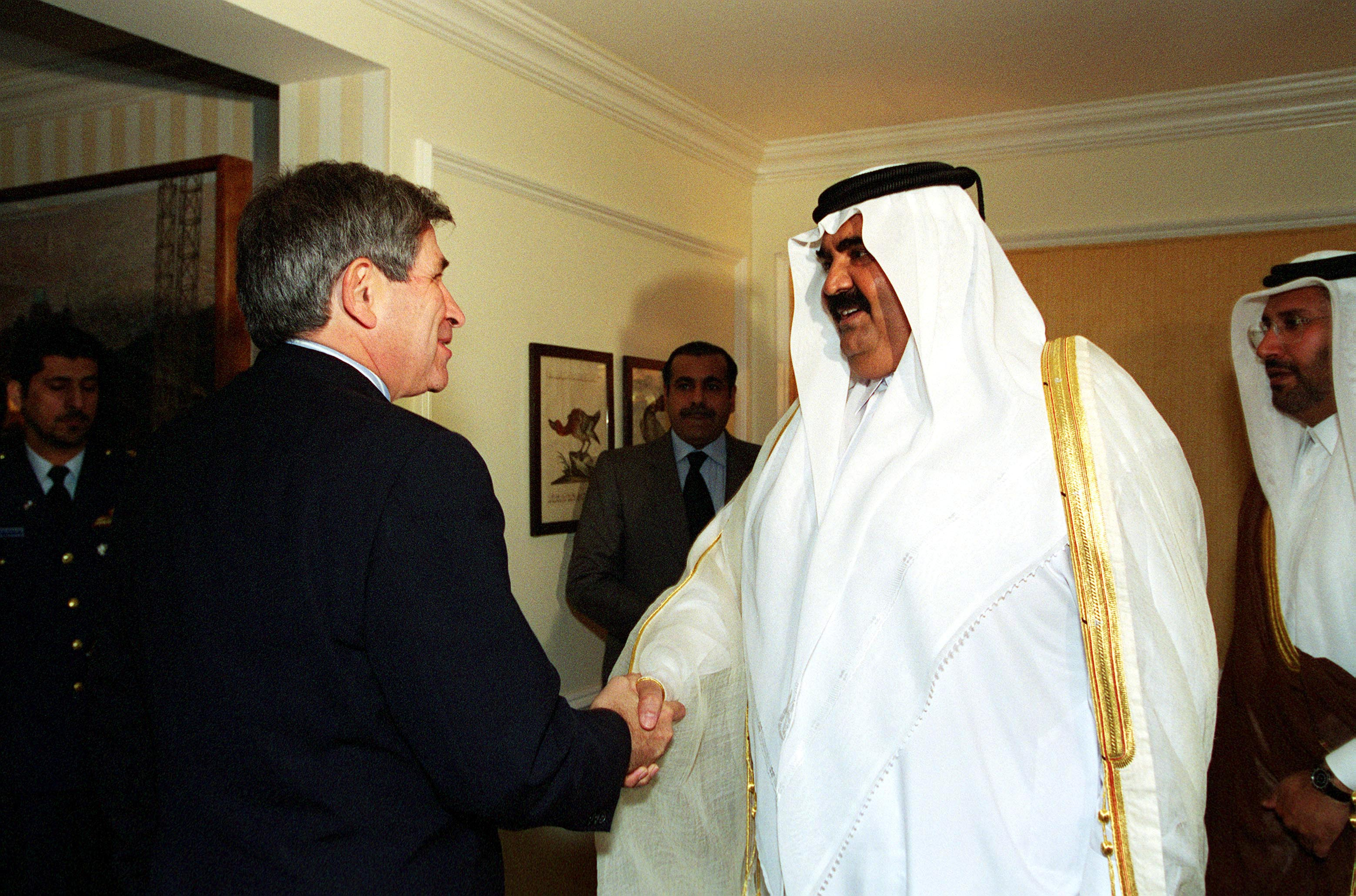
Wolfowitz meets with Qatari Emir Hamad bin Khalifa Al Thani, October 5, 2001

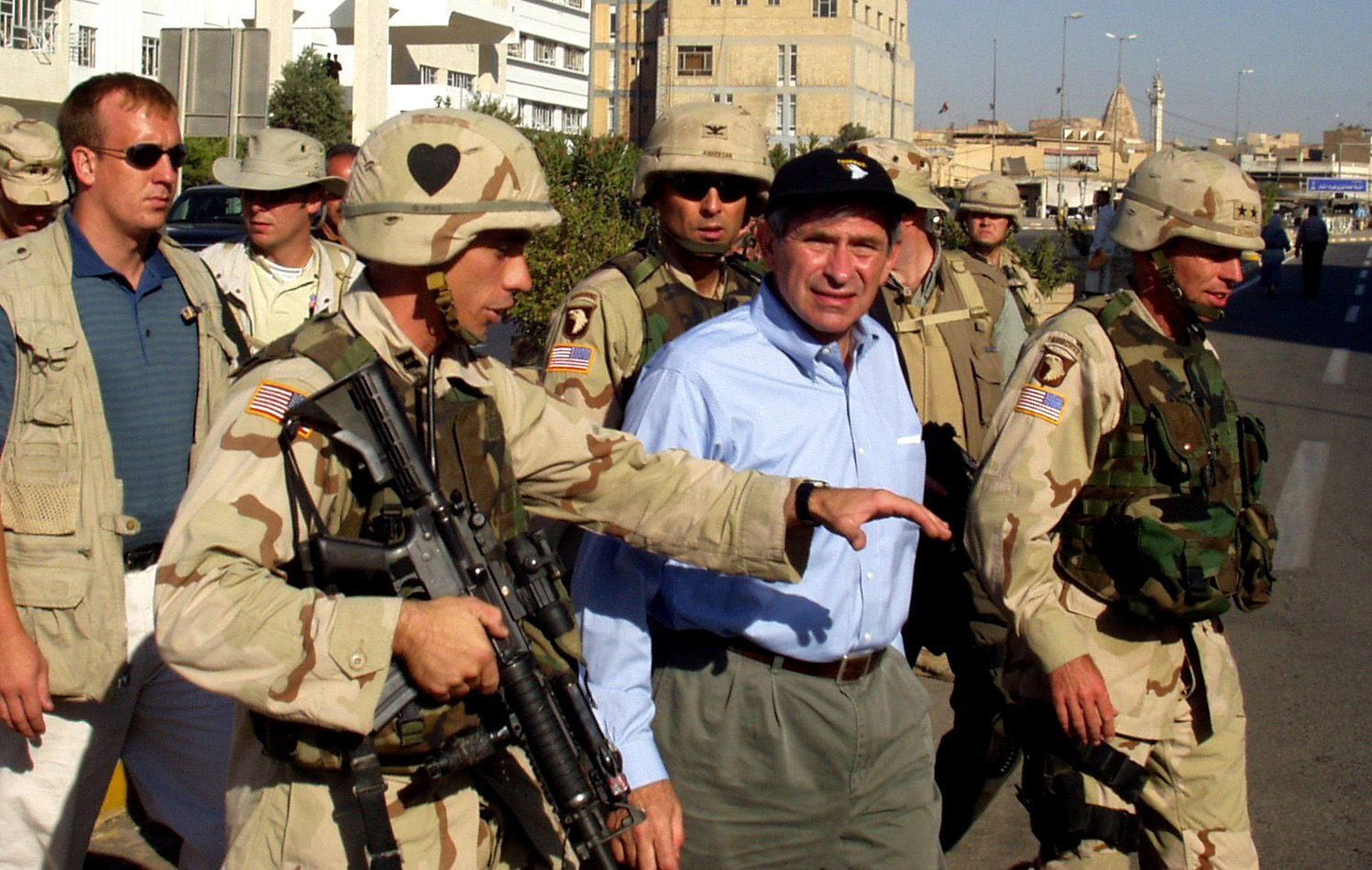
Dep. Sec. Wolfowitz is escorted by Army General David Petraeus as he tours Mosul, Iraq, July 21, 2003

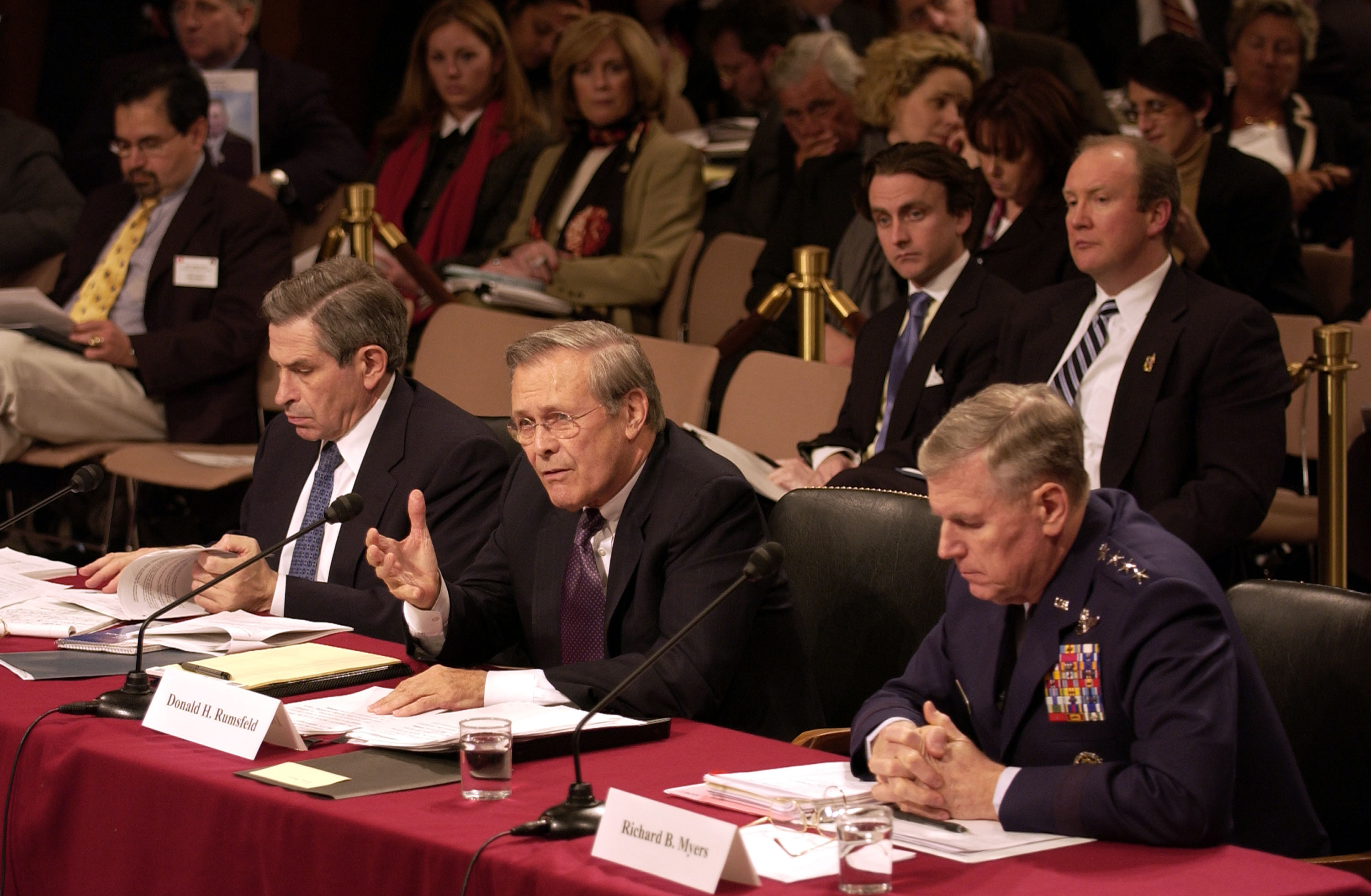
Wolfowitz, Rumsfeld, and General Richard Myers testifying before the 9/11 Commission in March 2004

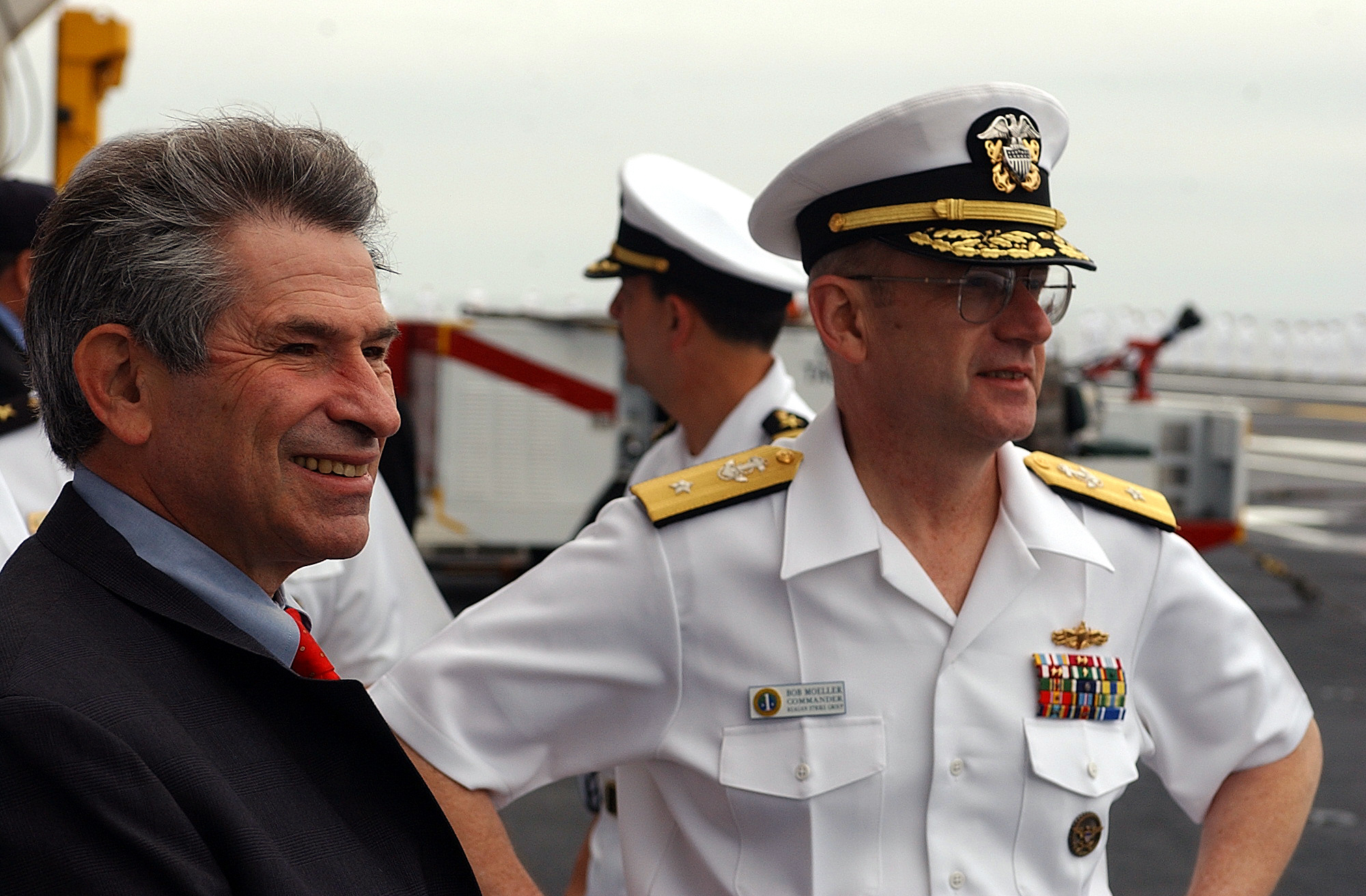
Wolfowitz and Rear Admiral Robert T. Moeller aboard the USS Ronald Reagan in July 2004

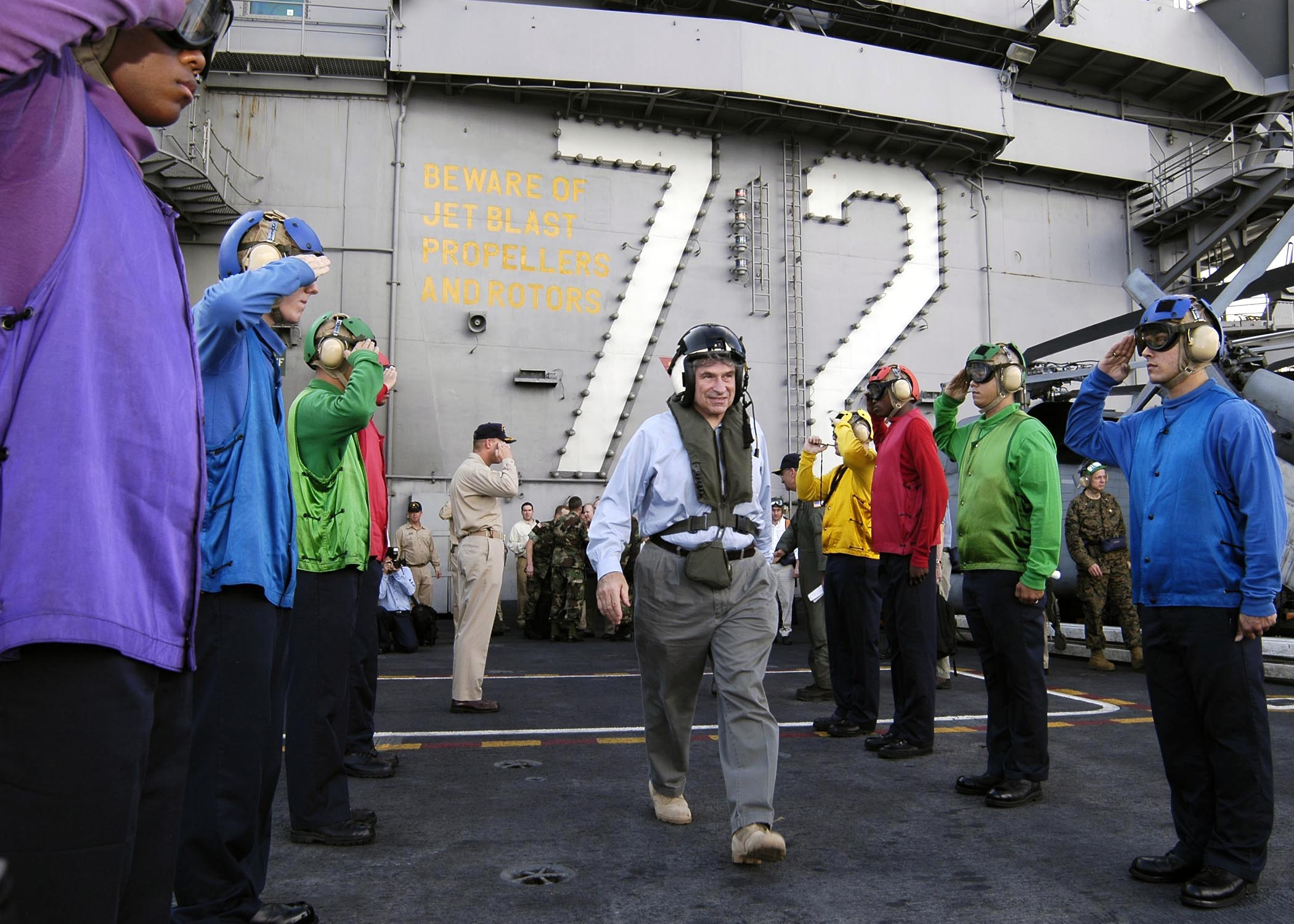
Deputy Secretary Wolfowitz departs the USS Abraham Lincoln (CVN-72) in January 2005.

From 2001 to 2005, during the George W. Bush administration, Wolfowitz served as U.S. Deputy Secretary of Defense reporting to U.S. Secretary of Defense Donald Rumsfeld.

The September 11 attacks in 2001 were a turning point in administration policy, as Wolfowitz later explained: "9/11 really was a wake up call and that if we take proper advantage of this opportunity to prevent the future terrorist use of weapons of mass destruction that it will have been an extremely valuable wake up call," adding: "if we say our only problem was to respond to 9/11, and we wait until somebody hits us with nuclear weapons before we take that kind of threat seriously, we will have made a very big mistake."

In the days following the September 11 attacks, Wolfowitz and Defense Secretary Donald Rumsfeld raised the possibility of military action against Iraq as part of the broader American response to terrorism. Wolfowitz argued that Saddam Hussein's government was a brittle regime that might be overthrown relatively easily. According to John Kampfner, Wolfowitz and Rumsfeld continued to advocate consideration of military action against Iraq despite opposition from other senior officials, including Secretary of State Colin Powell. These included subsequent discussions from which Powell was excluded. President Bush initially chose to concentrate the American military response on Afghanistan rather than Iraq.

After the September 11 attacks, the U.S. invaded Afghanistan to fight Al-Qaeda, which had orchestrated the attack. The invasion of Afghanistan began on October 7, 2001. On October 10, NATO Secretary-General George Robertson visited the Pentagon to discuss the alliance's possible contribution to the campaign. According to John Kampfner, Wolfowitz declined an offer of additional NATO forces, expressing confidence that the United States could conduct the initial operation without them. Kampfner also characterized the administration's immediate approach as placing relatively little emphasis on allied military participation and coalition diplomacy.

On January 15, 2003, with hostilities still continuing, Wolfowitz made a fifteen-hour visit to the Afghan capital, Kabul, and met with the new president Hamid Karzai. Wolfowitz stated, "We're clearly moving into a different phase, where our priority in Afghanistan is increasingly going to be stability and reconstruction. There's no way to go too fast. Faster is better." Despite the promises, according to Hersh, "little effort to provide the military and economic resources" necessary for reconstruction was made. This criticism would also re-occur after the 2003 invasion of Iraq later that year.

On April 15, 2002, the National Solidarity Rally for Israel was called in Washington to promote U.S. support and collaboration with Israel. Wolfowitz was the sole representative of the Bush administration to attend, speaking alongside former Israeli Prime Minister Benjamin Netanyahu and former New York Mayor Rudolph Giuliani. As reported by the BBC, Wolfowitz told the crowd that US President George W. Bush "wants you to know that he stands in solidarity with you". Sharon Samber and Matthew E. Berger reported for Jewish Telegraphic Agency (JTA) that Wolfowitz continued by saying that "Innocent Palestinians are suffering and dying as well. It is critical that we recognize and acknowledge that fact," before being booed and drowned out by chants of "No more Arafat."

Following the invasion of Afghanistan the Bush administration had started to plan for the next stage of the war on terror. According to John Kampfner, "Emboldened by their experience in Afghanistan, they saw the opportunity to root out hostile regimes in the Middle East and to implant very American interpretations of democracy and free markets, from Iraq to Iran and Saudi Arabia. Wolfowitz epitomized this view." Wolfowitz "saw a liberated Iraq as both paradigm and linchpin for future interventions." The 2003 invasion of Iraq began on March 19.

Wolfowitz was an early advocate of military action against Saddam Hussein. In a May 2003 interview with Sam Tanenhaus, he explained that the administration had emphasized Iraq's alleged weapons of mass destruction as its principal justification for military action partly because this was the issue on which officials could most readily agree. He also identified two additional concerns that had influenced the administration's position: Iraq's alleged connections to terrorism and Saddam Hussein's treatment of the Iraqi people. Wolfowitz emphasized that these concerns had been present from the beginning of the administration's deliberations, although he acknowledged that officials differed over the strength of the evidence connecting Iraq to terrorism.

The job of finding WMD and providing justification for the attack would fall to the intelligence services, but, according to Kampfner, "Rumsfeld and Wolfowitz believed that, while the established security services had a role, they were too bureaucratic and too traditional in their thinking." As a result, "they set up what came to be known as the 'cabal', a cell of eight or nine analysts in a new Office of Special Plans (OSP) based in the U.S. Defense Department." According to an unnamed Pentagon source quoted by Hersh, the OSP "was created in order to find evidence of what Wolfowitz and his boss, Defense Secretary Donald Rumsfeld, believed to be true—that Saddam Hussein had close ties to Al Qaeda, and that Iraq had an enormous arsenal of chemical, biological, and possibly even nuclear weapons that threatened the region and, potentially, the United States."

Within months of being set up, the OSP "rivaled both the CIA and the Pentagon's Defense Intelligence Agency, the DIA, as President Bush's main source of intelligence regarding Iraq's possible possession of weapons of mass destruction and connection with Al Qaeda." Hersh explains that the OSP "relied on data gathered by other intelligence agencies and also on information provided by the Iraqi National Congress, or INC, the exile group headed by Ahmad Chalabi." According to Kampfner, the CIA had ended its funding of the INC "in the mid-1990s when doubts were cast about Chalabi's reliability." Nevertheless, "as the administration geared up for conflict with Saddam, Chalabi was welcomed in the inner sanctum of the Pentagon" under the auspices of the OSP, and "Wolfowitz did not see fit to challenge any of Chalabi's information." The actions of the OSP have led to accusation of the Bush administration "fixing intelligence to support policy" with the aim of influencing Congress in its use of the War Powers Act.

Kampfner outlined Wolfowitz's strategy for the 2003 invasion of Iraq, which "envisaged the use of air support and the occupation of southern Iraq with ground troops, to install a new government run by Ahmed Chalabi's Iraqi National Congress." Wolfowitz believed that the operation would require minimal troop deployment, Hersh explains, because "any show of force would immediately trigger a revolt against Saddam within Iraq, and that it would quickly expand." The financial expenditure would be kept low, Kampfner observes, if "under the plan American troops would seize the oil fields around Basra, in the South, and sell the oil to finance the opposition."

On March 27, 2003, Wolfowitz told the House Appropriations Committee that oil revenue earned by Iraq alone would pay for Iraq's reconstruction after the Iraq war; he testified his "rough recollection" was: "The oil revenues of that country could bring between $50 and $100 billion over the course of the next two or three years. Now, there are a lot of claims on that money, but ... We are dealing with a country that can really finance its own reconstruction and relatively soon." By October of that year, "Lawrence Di Rita, the Pentagon's chief spokesman, said 'prewar estimates that may be borne out in fact are likelier to be more lucky than smart.' [He] added that earlier estimates and statements by Mr. Wolfowitz and others 'oozed with uncertainty.'" Di Rita's comments came as a much less optimistic secret Pentagon study—which had been complete at the time of Wolfowitz's testimony—was coming to public light, and when actual production results in Iraq were coinciding with those projected in the less optimistic Pentagon study.

During Wolfowitz's pre-war testimony before Congress, he dismissed General Eric K. Shinseki's estimates of the size of the post war occupation force which would be needed. General Shinseki testified to the US Senate Armed Services Committee on February 25, 2003, that "something in the order of several hundred thousand soldiers" would probably be required for postwar Iraq. By contrast, Wolfowitz estimated that fewer than 100,000 troops would be necessary in Iraq. Two days after Shinseki testified, Wolfowitz said to the House Budget Committee on February 27, 2003:

There has been a good deal of comment—some of it quite outlandish—about what our postwar requirements might be in Iraq. Some of the higher end predictions we have been hearing recently, such as the notion that it will take several hundred thousand U.S. troops to provide stability in post-Saddam Iraq, are wildly off the mark. It is hard to conceive that it would take more forces to provide stability in post-Saddam Iraq than it would take to conduct the war itself and to secure the surrender of Saddam's security forces and his army—hard to imagine.

On October 26, 2003, while in Baghdad staying at the Al-Rashid Hotel Wolfowitz narrowly escaped an attack when six rockets hit the floors below his room. Army Lt. Col. Charles H. Buehring was killed and seventeen other personnel resident in the hotel – including soldiers and civilians- were wounded. Wolfowitz and his DOD staffers escaped unharmed and returned to the United States on October 28, 2003.

=== President of the World Bank ===
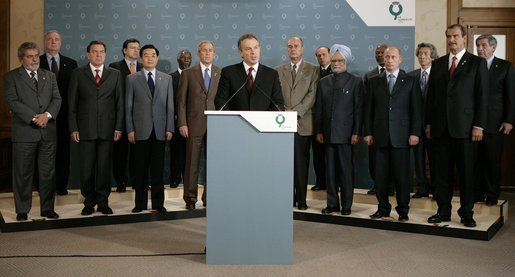
Press conference at G8 Summit (Paul Wolfowitz standing at rear on right)

In March 2005, Wolfowitz was nominated to be president of the World Bank by U.S. President George W. Bush. Criticism of his nomination appeared in the media. Nobel Laureate in Economics and former chief economist for the World Bank Joseph Stiglitz said: "'The World Bank will once again become a hate figure. This could bring street protests and violence across the developing world.'" In a speech at the U.N. Economic and Social Council, economist Jeffrey Sachs also opposed Wolfowitz: "It's time for other candidates to come forward that have experience in development. This is a position on which hundreds of millions of people depend for their lives ... Let's have a proper leadership of professionalism."

In the U.S., there was some praise for the nomination. An editorial in The Wall Street Journal stated:

Mr. Wolfowitz is willing to speak the truth to power ... he saw earlier than most, and spoke publicly about, the need for dictators to plan democratic transitions. It is the world's dictators who are the chief causes of world poverty. If anyone can stand up to the Robert Mugabes of the world, it must be the man who stood up to Saddam Hussein.

He was confirmed and became president on June 1, 2005. He soon attended the 31st G8 summit to discuss issues of global climate change and the economic development in Africa. When this meeting was interrupted by the July 7, 2005 London bombings, Wolfowitz was present with other world leaders at the press conference given by British Prime Minister Tony Blair.

Several of Wolfowitz's initial appointments at the bank proved controversial, including two U.S. nationals (Robin Cleveland and Kevin Kellems) formerly with the Bush administration, whom he appointed as close advisors with $250,000 tax-free contracts. Another appointee, Juan José Daboub, faced criticism, including from his colleagues, for attempting to bring policies on climate change and family planning towards a more conservative position.

Wolfowitz gave special emphasis to two particular issues. Identifying Sub-Saharan Africa as the region most challenged to improve living standards, he traveled widely in the region. He also made clear his focus on fighting corruption. Several aspects of the latter program raised controversy. Overturning the names produced by a formal search process, he appointed a figure linked to the U.S. Republican party to head the bank's internal watchdog. Member countries worried that Wolfowitz's willingness to suspend lending to countries on grounds of corruption was vulnerable to selective application in line with U.S. foreign policy interests. In a debate on the proposed Governance and Anti-Corruption Strategy at the bank's 2006 Annual Meetings, shareholders directed Wolfowitz to undertake extensive consultations and revise the strategy to show how objective measures of corruption would be incorporated into decisions and how the shareholders' representatives on the bank's Board would play a key role. Following the consultations and revisions, the Board approved a revised strategy in spring 2007.

== Controversies ==
=== Wolfowitz's relationship with Shaha Riza ===
After President George W. Bush nominated Wolfowitz as president of the World Bank, journalists reported that Wolfowitz was involved in a relationship with World Bank Senior Communications Officer (and Acting Manager of External Affairs) for the Middle East and North Africa Regional Office Shaha Ali Riza. According to Richard Leiby, of The Washington Post, Riza is "an Oxford-educated British citizen, was born in Tunisia and grew up in Saudi Arabia. She is known for her expertise on women's rights and has been listed on the bank's Web site as a media contact for Iraq reconstruction issues." According to Leiby and Linton Weeks, in their essay "In the Shadow of a Scandal", Riza's employment at the World Bank predated Wolfowitz's nomination as Bank president: "Riza started at the World Bank as a consultant in July 1997 and became a full-time employee in 1999"; and the relationship between Riza and Wolfowitz pre-dated it as well:

In the early 1990s, Riza joined the National Endowment for Democracy and is credited there with development of the organization's Middle East program. Wolfowitz was on the endowment's board—which is how Riza first met him, according to Turkish journalist Cengiz Candar, a friend of the couple. "Shaha was married at the time and Paul was married," Candar recalled, and it wasn't until late 1999—after Riza divorced and Wolfowitz had separated from his wife of 30 years, Clare Selgin Wolfowitz—that the couple began dating."

When Wolfowitz was considered for head of the CIA after the 2000 election, Clare Wolfowitz wrote President-elect George Bush a letter telling him that her husband's relationship with a foreign national—Riza—posed a national security risk. It has been reported that Scooter Libby intercepted the letter. Sidney Blumenthal also reported on the letter Clare Wolfowitz wrote:

This embittered letter remained a closely guarded secret, although a former high official of the CIA told me about it. Chris Nelson also reported it on April 16 in his widely respected, nonpartisan foreign policy newsletter: "A certain Ms. Riza was even then Wolfowitz's true love. The problem for the CIA wasn't just that she was a foreign national, although that was and is today an issue for anyone interested in CIA employment. The problem was that Wolfowitz was married to someone else, and that someone was really angry about it, and she found a way to bring her complaint directly to the President. So when we, with our characteristic innocence, put Wolfowitz on our short-list for CIA, we were instantly told, by a very, very, very senior Republican foreign policy operative, 'I don't think so.' " The Daily Mail of London also reported on his wife's letter when Wolfowitz was appointed president of the World Bank in 2005.

According to the London Sunday Times on March 20, 2005, despite their cultural differences:

Riza, an Arab feminist who confounds portrayals of Wolfowitz as a leader of a "Zionist conspiracy" of Jewish neoconservatives in Washington ... [and who] works as the bank's senior gender co-ordinator for the Middle East and North Africa ... not only shares Wolfowitz's passion for spreading democracy in the Arab world, but is said to have reinforced his determination to remove Saddam Hussein's oppressive regime.

The relationship created further controversy over Wolfowitz's nomination to head the World Bank, because the bank's ethics rules preclude sexual relationships between a manager and a staff member serving under that manager, even if one reports to the other only indirectly through a chain of supervision.

Wolfowitz initially proposed to the World Bank's Ethics Committee that he recuse himself from personnel matters regarding Riza, but the committee rejected that proposal. Riza was "seconded to the State Department", or placed on "external assignment", assigned "a job at the state department under Liz Cheney, the daughter of the vice-president, promoting democracy in the Middle East". She "was also moved up to a managerial pay grade in compensation for the disruption to her career", resulting in a raise of over $60,000, as well as guarantees of future increases; "The staff association claims that the pay rise was more than double the amount allowed under employee guidelines." A promotion and raise had been among the options suggested by a World Bank ethics committee that was set up to advise on the situation. According to Steven R. Weisman, however, in a report published in The New York Times, the then-current chair of the committee emphasized that he was not informed at the time of the details or extent of the present and future raises built into the agreement with Riza. Wolfowitz referred to the controversy concerning his relationship with Riza in a statement posted on the website of the World Bank at the time (April 12, 2007).

The affair resurfaced in headlines in 2011.

=== Wolfowitz's leadership of the World Bank Group ===
In early 2007, Fox News published on a series of investigative stories on the World Bank, based in part on leaks of internal bank documents. On April 11, 2007, Reuters and Al Kamen in The Washington Post, reported that Wolfowitz and the World Bank board had hired the Williams & Connolly law firm to oversee an investigation into the leaking of internal bank documents to Fox News. Those reports cite an internal memo to the bank staff later posted on the internet, dated April 9, 2007, in which the World Bank's general counsel, Ana Palacio, states that the bank's legal staff was scrutinizing two articles by investigative reporter Richard Behar published on the website of Fox News on January 31 and March 27, 2007. A day after the second report published by Behar, on March 28, 2007, Kamen had disclosed that "Bank records obtained by the Government Accountability Project" documented pay raises in excess of Bank policies given to Shaha Riza.

On April 12, 2007, the London Financial Times reported that, in a 2005 memorandum, Wolfowitz had personally directed the bank's human resources chief to offer Riza a large pay rise and promotion, according to two anonymous sources who told the Financial Times that they had seen the memo. The memo was part of a package of 102 pages of documents released by the bank on April 14, 2007.

On April 14, 2007, after reviewing these documents, the Financial Times concluded that it was "a potentially fatal blow" to Wolfowitz. In contrast, Fox News concluded that the new documents might offer Wolfowitz a "new lifeline" in the scandal, because the bank's ethics committee had launched a review of the Riza compensation case in early 2006 and concluded that it did not warrant any further attention by the committee. Wolfowitz failed, on April 19, 2007, to attend a high-profile meeting and the controversy led to disruption at the World Bank when some employees wore blue ribbons "in a display of defiance against his leadership."

World Bank Group's board of executive directors and staffers complained also that Wolfowitz was imposing Bush administration policies to eliminate family planning from World Bank programs. According to Nicole Gaouette, in her report published in the Los Angeles Times on April 19, 2007, Juan José Daboub—the managing director whom Wolfowitz had appointed who has also been criticized for overly-conservative policies concerning climate change and "a Roman Catholic with ties to a conservative Salvadoran political party"—repeatedly deleted references to family planning from World Bank proposals.

On May 14, 2007, the World Bank committee investigating the alleged ethics violations reported (in part):

- "Mr. Wolfowitz's contract requiring that he adhere to the Code of Conduct for board officials and that he avoid any conflict of interest, real or apparent, were violated";
- "The salary increase Ms. Riza received at Mr. Wolfowitz's direction was in excess of the range established by Rule 6.01";
- "The ad hoc group concludes that in actuality, Mr Wolfowitz from the outset cast himself in opposition to the established rules of the institution"; and
- "He did not accept the bank's policy on conflict of interest, so he sought to negotiate for himself a resolution different from that which would have applied to the staff he was selected to head."

Wolfowitz appeared before the World Bank Group's board of executive directors to respond on May 15. Adams speculated that "With Mr Wolfowitz so far refusing to step down, the board may need to take radical action to break the stalemate. Members have discussed a range of options, including sacking Mr Wolfowitz, issuing a vote of no confidence or reprimanding him. Some board members argue that a vote of no confidence would make it impossible for him to stay in the job." By Wednesday, May 16, 2007, The New York Times, reported that "after six weeks of fighting efforts to oust him as president ... Wolfowitz began today to negotiate the terms of his possible resignation, in return for the bank dropping or softening the charge that he had engaged in misconduct ..." After expressions from the Bush administration that it "fully" supported Wolfowitz as World Bank president and its urging a "fair hearing" for him, President Bush expressed "regret" at Wolfowitz's impending resignation.

On May 17, 2007, the World Bank Group's board of Executive Directors announced that Paul Wolfowitz would resign as World Bank Group president at the end of June 2007.

== Recent activities ==
As a visiting scholar of the American Enterprise Institute for Public Policy Research, Wolfowitz has blogged for the group and appeared in group events. In 2011, he wrote columns that appeared in publications such as The Independent, The Sunday Times, and Newsweek.

Wolfowitz is a former steering committee member of the Bilderberg group.

In February 2013, Wolfowitz publicly supported legal recognition for same-sex marriage in an amicus brief submitted to the US Supreme Court.

In February 2015, Wolfowitz advised presidential candidate Jeb Bush.

In August 2016, Wolfowitz announced his intention to vote for Hillary Clinton in the 2016 United States presidential election, despite having "serious reservations about her." However, in a December interview on Fox Business, Wolfowitz claimed that he did not in fact vote for Clinton.

In January 2017, Wolfowitz wrote an op-ed in The New York Times commenting on a "dissent cable" that had been signed by 1,000 Foreign Service Officers criticizing President Trump's executive action on immigration.

In February 2023, Wolfowitz was awarded Order of Brilliant Star with Grand Cordon by President of the Republic of China Tsai Ing-wen.

== See also ==
- Joint Vision 2020
- Washington Institute for Near East Policy (WINEP)
- World Bank Group

== Notes ==
Political offices
| Preceded by Anthony Lake | Director of Policy Planning; 1981–1982 | Succeeded by Stephen Bosworth |
| Preceded by John Holdridge | Assistant Secretary of State for East Asian and Pacific Affairs; 1982–1986 | Succeeded by Gaston Sigur |
| Preceded by Fred Iklé | Undersecretary of Defense for Policy; 1989–1993 | Succeeded by Frank Wisner |
| Preceded by Rudy de Leon | United States Deputy Secretary of Defense; 2001–2005 | Succeeded by Gordon England |
Diplomatic posts
| Preceded by John Holdridge | United States Ambassador to Indonesia; 1986–1989 | Succeeded by John Cameron Monjo |
| Preceded by James Wolfensohn | President of the World Bank Group; 2005–2007 | Succeeded by Robert Zoellick |
Academic offices
| Preceded by George Packard | Dean of the Paul H. Nitze School of Advanced International Studies; 1993–2001 | Succeeded by Jessica Einhorn |
