= Shaha Riza =

Libyan World Bank employee

Shaha Riza شاها
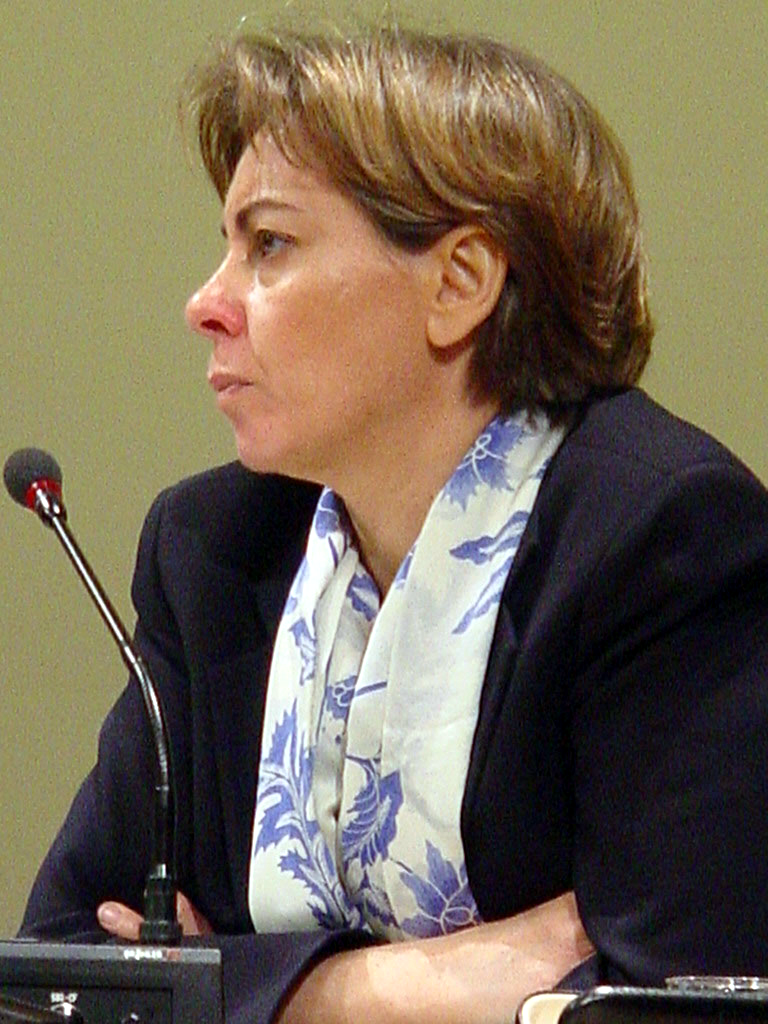
- Born: Tripoli, Libya
- Citizenship: United Kingdom
- Spouse: Bulent Ali Riza (divorced)
- Parent: Khalid Alwalid Algargany

Shaha Riza (Arabic: شاها علي رضا; born 1953 or 1954), is a Libyan former World Bank employee. Her external assignment at the Foundation for the Future, a "semi-independent foundation to promote democracy" is both in the Middle East and in North Africa.

In the mid-2000s, after allegations emerged that World Bank president Paul Wolfowitz had improperly used his influence to increase Riza's salary, Riza was asked to leave and Wolfowitz resigned. Wolfowitz's alleged motivation was a past romantic relationship with Riza. The Financial Times and The Wall Street Journal condemned the treatment of Riza and Wolfowitz.

== Early life ==
Riza was born a British national in Tripoli to a Libyan father and Saudi mother of Syrian descent. She grew up in Libya but attended a Catholic boarding school in England. Her father, Khalid Alwalid Algargany, was a consultant of King Abdul Aziz of Saudi Arabia, King Saud and King Faisal.

== Adulthood ==
She was educated at the London School of Economics, from which she received her bachelor's degree, and at St Antony's College, Oxford, from which she earned a master's degree in international relations in 1983. During the late 1980s, she relocated to the United States and married Bulent Ali Riza, with whom she had a son. The marriage later ended in divorce. She speaks Arabic, Turkish, English, French and Italian.

== Career ==
=== National Endowment for Democracy ===
At the National Endowment for Democracy she set up and led the endowment's Middle East programs, specializing in Middle East politics and economics field research.

=== U.S. Department of State ===
Later she was employed in the office of Elizabeth Cheney, under C. David Welch Assistant Secretary of State for Near Eastern Affairs. While there she began to spend time at the Foundation for the Future.

=== World Bank ===
Beginning as a consultant in July 1997 and then full-time in 1999, she worked with the Middle East and North Africa Social and Economic Development Group of the World Bank. First as a Senior Gender Specialist and then as a Senior Communications Officer, she was seated in the Middle East and North Africa Regional Office (MENA). By July 2002, she was acting manager for external affairs and outreach for MENA, but resigned after Paul Wolfowitz took leadership as World Bank president.

=== Freelance work ===
In 2004, Riza organized a major conference of North African and Middle Eastern groups in Beirut. Her goal was to inspire democratic reforms in the aftermath of the fall of Saddam Hussein as she felt planting democracy in Iraq will inspire other regimes to democratic goals. Riza reportedly earned $180,000 salary after taxes and worked from home in 2008.

== World Bank controversy ==
Riza did not report to the World Bank president, Paul Wolfowitz while at the World Bank. Riza was romantically linked to Wolfowitz prior to his World Bank involvement, when he was Deputy Secretary of Defence under Donald Rumsfeld in the Bush administration. In 2005 Wolfowitz offered to sign a statement to isolate himself from her which only served to draw scrutiny to what grew into a perceived conflict of interest. The World Bank ethics committee rejected Wolfowitz's proposal after Wolfowitz refused to include recusal from professional contact with Riza in the proposal.

Subsequently, Paul Wolfowitz was alleged to have involved himself in Riza's career by personally increasing her pay. This was a potential impropriety. Instead, Riza was asked to leave the World Bank altogether. She even gave up a promotion for which she was highly recommended. By 2007, the Board of the World Bank accepted that Paul Wolfowitz acted ethically. Still, Wolfowitz resigned by June of that year.

In retrospect, staffing policy was to the contrary. Rule 4.01, paragraph 5.2, states that spouses and registered domestic partners are barred from working in situations where "one supervises the other directly or indirectly", but informal relationships fall under rule 3.01, paragraph 4.02, which states that in such cases, as Wolfowitz and Riza's relationship, the supervisor "shall be responsible for seeking a resolution of the conflict of interest."

In 2007, Riza released an internal statement which she had submitted as part of a defence to her employers to The Wall Street Journal as follows:

1. My professional status at the Bank pre-dates the arrival of the new President. I began work in the Bank in 1997.
2. There is no Bank regulation or staff rule that required me to leave the Bank in order to resolve this situation.
3. I was not given a choice to stay and, against my personal preference and professional interests, I agreed to accept an external assignment in 2005 upon the insistence of the Ethics Committee.
4. Against Bank rules and the Agreement I signed with the Bank, the details of the assignment and my personnel file have been leaked to the press and staff. As you well know my salary and grade level are quite common for World Bank staff that have years of experience, background and education similar to mine.
5. The cumulative effect of the decision made in 2005 and the recent media circus over the issue have done significant harm to my career, my personal well-being, and my prospects to continue the work I love and where my expertise resides.

=== Public outcry ===
Prominent newspapers, among them The Financial Times and The Wall Street Journal condemned the fates of Wolfowitz and Riza. Christopher Hitchens described the removal of Riza and Wolfowitz as "character assassination." He surmised that this was all due to personal conflict between the U.S. and European branches at the World Bank. Further, he surmised that this was retribution for Wolfowitz's support of the Iraq war.

Robert Holland maintained that Wolfowitz's resignation has nothing to do with Riza's promotion. Holland served on the bank's board of directors until 2006. Sari Nusseibeh wrote an open letter to the Washington Post on April 30, 2007 about this "unfair and vicious campaign." Andrew Young describes Riza as "an admired World Bank professional and a champion of human rights." Sandra Day O'Connor, a board member at the Foundation for the Future, described Riza as "a very competent person." Even Clare Selgin Wolfowitz praises Riza, "Shaha Riza is a dedicated and serious reform advocate who has my respect."

On April 17, 2007, the editorial page of The Wall Street Journal published an op-ed that characterized the scandal as a witch hunt. The New York Times called for Wolfowitz's resignation on April 28, 2007.

=== World Bank stance ===
Wolfowitz was confirmed as president in June 2005. According to a World Bank Ethics Committee Case report, Wolfowitz acknowledged his association with Riza and stated that "...during the negotiations of my contract, to avoid any appearance of a conflict of interest, I provided a statement to the Board recusing myself from any personnel actions or decisions with respect to a longstanding professional staff member of the Bank with whom it has been reported that I have a prior personal relationship." The committee proposed a recommendation of "mutually agreed separation."

== Autobiography and publication list ==
- Worldbank Group Staff Connections 2005 (PDF)
- Worldbank Group Communications
