= 20Twenty (bank) =

20twenty
- Type: Private
- Industry: Banking
- Founded: 2001
- Defunct: 2006
- Fate: Bankruptcy
- Headquarters: Cape Town, South Africa
- Area served: South Africa
- Key people: Christo Davel (CEO)
- Products: Retail banking
- Number of employees: ~100 (2006)
- Website: www.20twenty.com

20Twenty was an online South African retail bank that specialized in no-frills digital banking. It focused on offering low transaction costs with low interest rates on loans whilst offering higher interest rates on savings.

By the time of its closure in 2006 it had an estimated client base of 20,000 to 40,000 account holders. The bank was known for its customer service and loyal client base.

== History ==
It was founded in July 2001 by South African internet entrepreneur Christo Davel. Due to the length of time and complicated bureaucratic process of setting up a bank in South Africa the company entered into a partnership with existing South African bank Saambou to use their banking license.

In the agreement Saambou obtained a 65% share in the company. It initially only offered customers a single account that was a combined current account and savings account and issued a single Master-Card that functioned as a credit and debit card. Shortly after the bank's launch its parent bank Saambou collapsed in 2002 resulting in the freezing of 20Twenty accounts.

After 18 months of negotiations 20Twenty was sold to Standard Chartered for US$10 million (R61 million) in August 2003. In November 2005 Standard Chartered put the bank up for sale. Two months later in January 2006 Standard Charted announced that it would be closing 20Twenty after failing to find a buyer.
