= Jessica Einhorn =

American executive and academic

6th Dean of the Paul H. Nitze School of Advanced International Studies
- In office 2002–2012
- Preceded by: Paul Wolfowitz
- Succeeded by: Vali Nasr

Personal details
- Education: Barnard College (BA); Johns Hopkins University (MA); Princeton University (PhD)

Jessica P. Einhorn served as Dean of Washington's Paul H. Nitze School of Advanced International Studies (SAIS) of the Johns Hopkins University from 2001 until 2012. Einhorn succeeded Paul Wolfowitz, who resigned in 2001 to become the U.S. Deputy Secretary of Defense. Einhorn is also a member of the Board of Directors of Time Warner, Inc., a member of the Board of Directors of BlackRock, Inc., a former director of the Council on Foreign Relations, and a former managing director at the World Bank.

Einhorn holds a Ph.D. in politics from Princeton University, an M.A. in international relations from SAIS, and a B.A. from Barnard College. She is the first alumna of SAIS to become its dean.
