= Love to Life =

Single by Twenty Twenty

from the album Small Talk
- Released: 17 April 2011
- Recorded: 2010
- Genre: Pop
- Length: 3:09
- Label: Geffen Records
- Songwriter(s): Sam Halliday, Jack Halliday, Sonny Watson-Lang, Jim Irvine, Julian Emery

Twenty Twenty singles chronology
"Worlds Apart" (2010)	"Love to Life" (2011)

"Love to Life" is a song by English pop rock trio Twenty Twenty, and released on their debut studio album Small Talk. The single was released in the United Kingdom on 17 April 2011. It peaked to number 60 on the UK Singles Chart.

== Music video ==
The music video for the song was uploaded to YouTube on 10 March 2011.

== Track listing ==
Digital download
No.	Title	Length
1.	"Love to Life"	3:09
2.	"Tell Me a Secret"	3:11

== Charts ==
Chart (2011)	Peak Position
UK Singles (The Official Charts Company)	60

== Release history ==
Region	Date	Format	Label
United Kingdom	17 April 2011	Digital download	Geffen Records
