= Peter Selgin =

American author and English professor

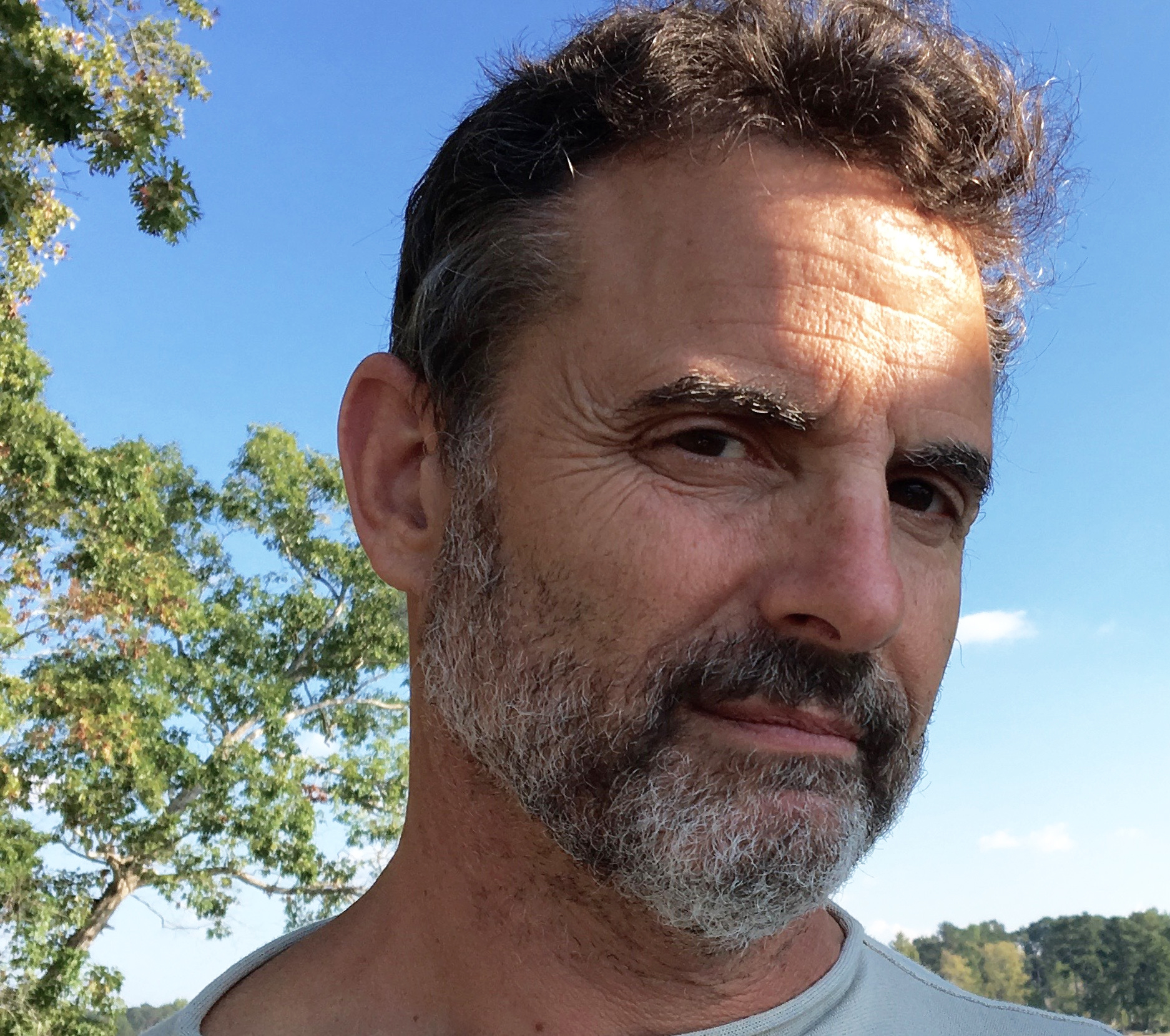
Peter A. Selgin

Peter Selgin (/ˈsɛldʒɪn/; born 1957) is an American novelist, short story writer, playwright, essayist, editor, and illustrator. Selgin is associate professor of English at Georgia College & State University in Milledgeville, Georgia.

== Biography ==
The son of Italian immigrants, Peter Selgin was born in Bethesda, Maryland, grew up in Bethel, Connecticut, and attended Bethel High School. Following high school, he attended Pratt Institute in Brooklyn, New York, where he studied film, theater and visual art. He later attended Bard College, and earned his Bachelor of Arts in English from Western Connecticut State University. In addition to writing plays and stories, he worked as a visual artist—including as a caricaturist, illustrator, and painter. Nerve damage to his hand from a dog attack in 1981 temporarily sidelined his career. Selgin's injury and its aftermath are the subject of The Best American Essays "Confessions of a Left-Handed Man".

Selgin earned his Master of Fine Arts degree from the New School University in New York City in 2005. As of 2021, he is an Associate Professor in the MFA program at Georgia College & State University in Milledgeville, Georgia. He previously taught creative writing at Antioch College in Los Angeles, Montclair State University in New Jersey, and New York University, among other universities and colleges. He has also taught creative writing at various community organizations, including the Gotham Writers' Workshop, The Center for Fiction (formerly, the Mercantile Library for Fiction), and the Bronx Writers' Center, among others. For several summers, he has organized and led a week-long creative writing workshop in Vitorchiano, Italy.

Selgin was the Viebranz Distinguished Writer-in-Residence at St. Lawrence University in Canton, New York.

Selgin is also the creative non-fiction editor of Arts & Letters, a national literary journal published by the MFA Creative Writing program at Georgia College & State University.

His twin brother, George Selgin is Director of the Cato Institute's Center for Monetary & Financial Alternatives. His half-sister, Clare Selgin Wolfowitz, is an editor and expert in Indonesian anthropology.

== Works ==
Fiction

Selgin's debut short story collection, Drowning Lessons (2008), won the 2007 Flannery O'Connor Award for Short Fiction. His first novel, Life Goes to the Movies (2009) was a finalist for both the James Jones First Novel Fellowship and the Association of Writers & Writing Programs Award for the Novel. His second novel, "The Water Master", won the 2011 William Faulkner-William Wisdom prize for best novel. His third novel, Duplicity (2020), was a finalist for the 2020 Elixir PressBook Prize, the 2020 Steel Toe Boots Book Prize, and the 2019 CRAFT First Chapter Contest.

Non-fiction

Selgin is also the author of two non-fiction books on the craft of fiction writing, By Cunning & Craft, and 179 Ways to Save a Novel. His first book of essays, Confessions of a Left-Handed Man, was published by the University of Iowa Press / Sightline Books in October 2011. His memoir, "The Inventors", was published by Hawthorne Books in 2016. It won the 2017 Housatonic Book Award for non-fiction. His book on the craft of narrative fiction and non-fiction, "Your First Page: First Pages and What They Tell Us About the Pages That Follow Them," was published in 2017 by Serving House Books. Selgin's most recent book is a memoir hybrid titled Painting Stories (2026), which features his artwork, also published by Serving House Books.

Plays

As a playwright, Selgin has been a three-time finalist for the Eugene O'Neill Center National Playwrights Conference Award. His stage drama, A God in the House, based on Dr. Jack Kevorkian and his "suicide machine", was presented there in 1991, and subsequently optioned for off-Broadway. A God in the House also won the Mill Mountain Theatre New Plays Competition (1990). Night Blooming Serious, another full-length drama, won the Charlotte Repertory New Plays Festival Competition (1993).

Visual art

Selgin's illustrations and paintings have been featured in The New Yorker, Gourmet, Outside, Fine Gardening, San Francisco, Boston, Forbes, U.S. Art, American Illustration, Time-Out New York, the Chicago Tribune, and The Wall Street Journal, as well as NPR's Weekend Edition, Fox's Good Day New York, and CNBC's Great Stuff. As a commercial artist, he storyboarded several motion picture scenes, including the gargoyle special effects sequences in Tales from the Darkside. For eight years, beginning in 2005, he served as art director of Alimentum: The Literature of Food. He is currently art director of Arts & Letters, a national literary journal operating from the MFA program at Georgia College in Milledgeville, Georgia. Selgin is also a book cover designer.

Children's books

Selgin has also written and illustrated several picture books for children, including, S.S. Gigantic Across the Atlantic.

== Awards ==
- "Duplicity," Semi-Finalist 2020 Elixir Press Book Prize
- "Duplicity," Finalist 2020 Steel Toe Boots Book Prize
- "Duplicity," Finalist 2019 Craft First Chapter Contest
- "The Inventors," Winner, 2017 Housatonic Book Award for Nonfiction
- "The Opening Credits to Rebel Without a Cause," Best American Notable Essay 2018
- "Noise," Best American Notable Essay, 2017
- "The Strange Case of Arthur Silz," Pushcart Prize Nomination, 2017
- "The Water Master," Semi-Finalist: Big Moose Prize, Black Lawrence Press, May 2016
- "Hattertown," Semi-Finalist: Big Moose Prize, Black Lawrence Press, April 2015
- "The Inventors, a Memoir," First Finalist / Second Place, AWP Award for Creative Nonfiction, June 2014
- "My New York: A Romance in Eight Parts," Best American Travel Writing 2014, Selected by Guest Editor Paul Theroux, January 2014
- "My New York: A Romance in Eight Parts," Best American Essays 2014, (John Jeremiah Sullivan: Series Editor), Best Notable Essay, 2014
- "The Kuhreihen Melody," Best American Essay 2013 (Cheryl Strayed: Guest Editor), Best Notable Essay, 2013
- "The Kuhreihen Melody," Pushcart Nomination (by Pushcart Distinguished Editorial Board member Wally Lamb), 2013
- "Confessions of a Left-Handed Man: An Artist's Memoir," Short-Listed, William Saroyan Prize for International Writing, 2012
- "The Water Master," Finalist, Dana Award for Novel, 2012
- "The Kuhreihen Melody", Winner, The Dana Award in the Essay category, 2012
- "The Kuhreihen Melody", Winner, Essay category, The Missouri Review Editor's Prize, 2012
- "The Water Master," William Faulkner-William Wisdom prize for best Novel, 2012
- "Alone: Two Types of Solitude", Best American Notable Essay, 2011
- "Titanic Obsession", Second Prize, The Missouri Review Editor's Prize, 2011
- Finalist, ForeWord Magazine Book of the Year, Life Goes to the Movies, 2010
- "Dead to Rights: Confessions of a Caricaturist", Best American Notable Essay, 2009
- Virginia Center for the Creative Arts Residency Fellowship, 2009, 2008
- "A Pre-Victorian Bathtub", Best American Notable Essay, 2008
- Restaurant, Best American Notable Essay, 2007
- Drowning Lessons,Flannery O'Connor Award for Short Fiction, 2007
- A God in the House, Winner, Stage 3 Theatre New Play Festival, 2007
- Bronx Arts Council Fellowship, 2007
- "Confessions of a Left-Handed Man," Best American Essays 2006, Selected by Guest Editor Lauren Slater, 2006
- Second Place, Association of Writers & Writing Programs Award for the Novel, Best American Essay, 2006
- Glimmer Train Very Short Fiction Award, Man in the White Car, 2001
- Blue Mountain Center, Residency Fellowship, 1999
- Mill Mountain Theatre New Plays Award, A God in the House, 1992
- National Playwright's Conference Award, A God in the House, 1991
- Charlotte Repertory New Plays Award, Night Blooming Serious, 1991

== Books ==
- S. S. Gigantic Across the Atlantic (1999), Simon & Schuster, ISBN 0-689-82467-X
- By Cunning & Craft: Sound Advice and Practical Wisdom for Fiction Writers (2007), Writer's Digest Books, ISBN 1-58297-491-8
- Drowning Lessons (2008), University of Georgia Press, ISBN 0-8203-3210-0
- Life Goes to the Movies (2009), Dzanc Books, ISBN 0-9793123-8-8
- 179 Ways to Save a Novel: Matters of Vital Concern to Fiction Writers (2010) Writer's Digest Books, ISBN 1-58297-607-4
- Confessions of a Left-Handed Man (2011), University of Iowa Press / Sightline Books
- The Inventors (2016), Hawthorne Books and Literary Arts
- Your First Page: First Pages and What They Tell Us About the Pages that Follow Them (2018), Serving House Books
- Your First Page Revised Classroom Edition (2019), Broadview Press
- The Kuhreihen Melody: Nostalgic Essays (2019), Serving House Books. ISBN 978-1947175167
- Duplicity (2020), Serving House Books. ISBN 978-1947175433
- A Boy's Guide to Outer Space (2024), Regal House Publishing, ISBN 9781646035113
- Painting Stories (2026), Sevring House Books, ISBN 9781947175983
