= Small Talk (Twenty Twenty album) =

Studio album by Twenty Twenty
- Released: 25 April 2011
- Genre: Pop punk, power pop
- Length: 28:34
- Label: Geffen Records

Twenty Twenty chronology
Worlds Apart (2010)	Small Talk (2011)

Singles from Twenty Twenty
- 1. "Love to Life" Released: 17 April 2011

Small Talk is the debut album by British pop band Twenty Twenty. It was released for pre-order on 7 March 2011 before its general release on 25 April 2011. It charted at 26 in the UK on 9 May 2011. The first single from the album was Love to Life which peaked at number 60 in the UK when released on 17 April 2011.

== Track listing ==
No.	Title	Length
1.	"Love to Life"	3:10
2.	"Get Down"	3:36
3.	"Girl Next Door"	2:57
4.	"Burning Up"	2:51
5.	"The Puppeteer"	3:28
6.	"Superwoman"	2:57
7.	"Jamie's Girl"	3:42
8.	"Love's a Freak"	2:47
9.	"Scared of Heights (iTunes bonus track)"	3:12

== Personnel ==
- Sam Halliday - lead vocals, lead guitar
- Jack Halliday - bass guitar, backing vocals
- Sonny Watson-Lang - drums, backing vocals

== Chart performance ==
Chart (2011)	Peak position
UK Albums Chart	26
