= George Selgin =

American economist (born 1957)

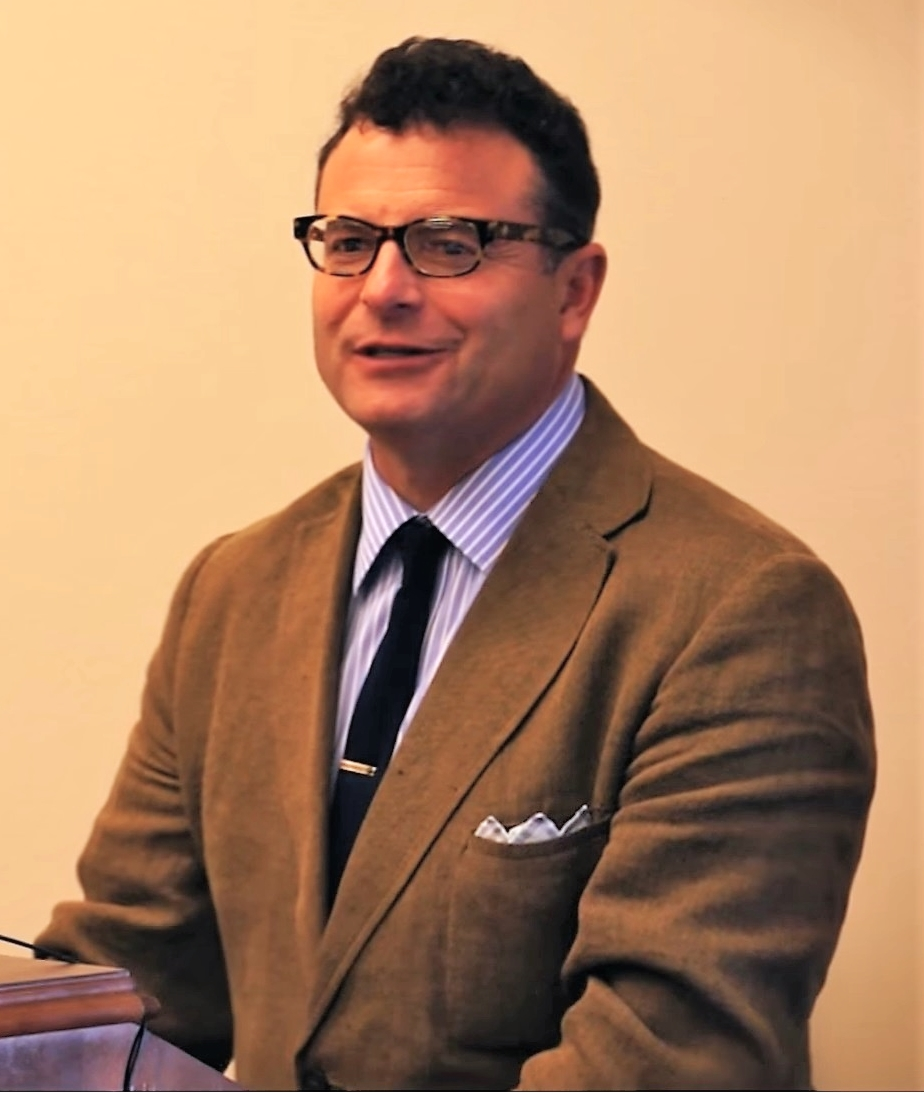
- Selgin speaks at the Ron Paul Fed Lecture Series in 2012.
- Born: February 15, 1957 (age 69)

Academic background
- Education: New York University (PhD) 1986; Drew University (B.A.) 1979
- Influences: Friedman, Hayek, David Laidler, White, Wicksell, Leland Yeager

Academic work
- Discipline: Macroeconomics, monetary theory, banking theory, and monetary history
- School or tradition: Free banking
- Institutions: The University of Georgia
- Website: Information at IDEAS / RePEc

George Selgin (/ˈsɛldʒɪn/; born February 15, 1957) is an American economist. Before retiring in July 2025, he was a Senior Fellow at the Cato Institute, the founding Director of its Center for Monetary and Financial Alternatives, and editor-in-chief of that Center's online publication, Alt-M. He is also Professor Emeritus of economics at the Terry College of Business at the University of Georgia, an Honorary Professor at Francisco Marroquin University, and an associate editor of Econ Journal Watch. Selgin previously taught at George Mason University, the University of Hong Kong, and West Virginia University

== Research ==
Selgin's research covers a broad range of topics within the field of monetary economics, including monetary history, macroeconomic theory, and the history of monetary thought. He is one of the founders, along with Kevin Dowd and Lawrence H. White, of the Modern Free Banking School, which draws its inspiration from the writings of Friedrich Hayek on denationalization of money and choice in currency. A central claim of the Free Banking School is that the effects of government intervention in monetary systems cannot be properly appreciated except with reference to a theory of monetary laissez-faire, analogous to the theory of free trade that informs the modern understanding of the effects of tariffs and other trade barriers. The free bankers argue that, viewed in light of such a theory, financial crises and business cycles are largely attributable to misguided government interference with freely-evolved and competitive monetary arrangements, including legislation granting central banks exclusive rights to issue paper currency.

Selgin is also known for his advocacy of a "productivity norm" for monetary policy—an ideal according to which the growth-rate of nominal gross domestic product should be such as will allow the (output) price level to decline along with goods' real (unit) costs of production—that is, at a rate opposite the growth rate of total factor productivity. According to Selgin, by preventing mild deflation in response to productivity gains, monetary authorities risk inadvertently fueling unsustainable booms or economic bubbles, setting the stage for consequent busts and recession. Because it requires that aggregate spending grow at a steady rate equal to the trend growth rate of weighted factor input growth, Selgin's ideal is a version of nominal income targeting. As such, it helped to inspire and supply theoretical support to the post-Great Recession movement favoring NGDP targeting.

Selgin is considered a Bitcoin OG ("Original Gangsta"), having taken part in discussions with others on the cypherpunk mailing list (including Wei Dai and Nick Szabo) that led to Bitcoin's invention, which Hal Finney and Nick Szabo say he helped to inspire. He was one of the first economists to explore the economics of Bitcoin and other cryptocurrencies. He is also an expert on the history and economics of old-fashioned metallic coinage. His book Good Money tells the story of the private minting of coins during Great Britain's Industrial Revolution. He is one of the foremost authorities on Gresham's law—the oldest of all economic laws concerning money.

During 1990 and 1991, Selgin and Kurt Schuler, then a Senior Economist to the Vice Chairman of the United States Congressional Joint Economic Committee, advised the government of Lithuania on post-Soviet currency reform]. Although their proposal—a revived Lithuanian litas to be issued by a currency board and fully backed by German marks—was not immediately adopted, it became the basis for several later post-Soviet currency board proposals. In 1993 Lithuania itself revived and implemented Selgin and Schuler's proposal, though with a dollar- rather than a mark-based litas. The new litas prevailed until 2015, when Lithuania joined the Eurozone. (In a 1992 "Wall Street Journal" article, Selgin himself proposed that newly independent post-Soviet nations establish European Currency Unit-based currency boards, meaning ones whose currencies were fully backed by Eurobonds. That plan would have allowed the nations in question to issue Euros before any other European nation had done so!)

Although Selgin earned his PhD at New York University, where he studied with Austrian economists Israel Kirzner, Fritz Machlup, Ludwig Lachmann, and Lawrence H. White (his dissertation supervisor), and where he wrote "Praxeology and Understanding," an essay defending Ludwig von Mises's methodological writings, Selgin subsequently disavowed membership in the Austrian (or any other) school of economics. His reasons for doing so included strong disagreement with the views of some prominent self-proclaimed Austrians, including followers of Murray Rothbard who claim that fractional-reserve banking is inherently fraudulent. Instead Selgin argues that both ancient laws and the common law recognized money handlers' ownership rights to loose (as opposed to "bagged") coins surrendered to them. He has also challenged the popular belief that England's early goldsmith bankers deceived their customers by lending coins they were supposed to be storing in their vaults.

After joining the Cato Institute in 2014, Selgin became a leading critic of some of the Federal Reserve's post-Great Recession policies, including its decision to permanently switch to an ample reserves or "floor" operating system, and its decision to build a "real time" retail payments network to compete with one established by commercial bankers. Most recently, he has taken on the growing movement to have the Fed make use of its quantitative easing powers, not solely to combat recessions, but as a means for funding ambitious government projects that bypasses Congress's normal appropriations process. Selgin was also among the more prominent critics of the Fed's COVID-19 era "Main Street Lending Program," warning—correctly, as events proved—that it would prove a failure either because of low demand for its loans (if it excluded unsound borrowers) or (if it didn't) because it would incur substantial losses. In fact, the program proved a failure on both scores.

Selgin's 2025 book, False Dawn: The New Deal and the Promise of Recovery, 1933-1947, a comprehensive assessment of the New Deal's contribution to the United States' recovery from the Great Depression, was included in "The Wall Street Journal"'s list of "The Top 10 Books of 2025".

Selgin is the twin brother of author and illustrator Peter Selgin and the half-brother of anthropologist Clare Selgin Wolfowitz. His other half-sister, Ann Selgin Levy, is a fabric artist and culinary author. His father, Paul Selgin, was an inventor whose numerous patents include many for optical measuring devices for use in manufacturing. His PhD students include David Beckworth, host of the Mercatus Center's popular "Macro Musings" podcast.

== Education ==
- Ph.D., Economics, New York University, 1986
- B.A., Economics and Zoology, Drew University, 1979

== Published works ==
=== Books ===
- False Dawn: The New Deal and the Promise of Recovery, 1933-1947 (2025). ISBN 978-0-22683-293-7
- The Menace of Fiscal QE (2020). ISBN 978-1-94864-793-9
- Floored! How a Misguided Fed Experiment Deepened and Prolonged the Great Recession (2018). ISBN 978-1-94864-708-3
- Less Than Zero: The Case for a Falling Price Level in a Growing Economy (2018). ISBN 978-1-94864-710-6
- Financial Stability without Central Banks (2018). ISBN 978-0-255-36753-0
- Money: Free & Unfree (2017). ISBN 978-1-94442-430-5
- Good Money: Birmingham Button Makers, the Royal Mint, and the Beginnings of Modern Coinage (2008). ISBN 978-0-472-11631-7.
- Bank Deregulation and Monetary Order (1996). ISBN 0-415-14056-0.
- Readings in Money and Banking (1995). ISBN 0-536-58930-5.
- Praxeology and Understanding (1991). ISBN 978-1-4793-5718-5.
- The Theory of Free Banking: Money Supply under Competitive Note Issue (1988). ISBN 0-8476-7578-5.

=== Scholarly articles ===
- Selgin, George. (2020). "On Targeting the Price of Gold"
- Selgin, George. (2019)."The Fed's New Operating Framework: How We Got Here and Why We Shouldn't Stay" Cato Journal
- Selgin, George. (2016)."Real and Pseudo Monetary Rules" (2016). Cato Journal
- Selgin, George and Bahadir, Berrak. (2015). "The Productivity Gap: Monetary Policy, the Subprime Boom, and the Post-2011 Productivity Surge". Journal of Policy Modeling
- Selgin, George. (2015)."Law, Legislation, and the Gold Standard".Cato Journal
- Selgin, George. (2014)."Operation Twist-the-Truth: How the Federal Reserve Misrepresents Its History and Performance". Cato Journal
- Selgin, George. (2013). "Those Dishonest Goldsmiths". Financial History Review
- Selgin, George. (2013) "Synthetic Commodity Money". Journal of Financial Stability
- Selgin, George. (2013)."Incredible Commitments: Why the EMU Is Destroying Both Europe and Itself". Cato Journal
- Selgin, George, Lastrapes, William D., and White, Lawrence H.. (2012)."Has the Fed Been a Failure?". Journal of Macroeconomics
- Selgin, George and Lastrapes, William. (2012). "Banknotes and Economic Growth". Scottish Journal of Political Economy
- Selgin, George. (2012)."L Street: Bagehotian Prescriptions for a 21st Century Money Market". Cato Journal
- Selgin, George and Turner, John. (2011) "Strong Steam, Weak Patents, or, the Myth of Watt's Innovation-Blocking Monopoly, Exploded". Journal of Law & Economics
- Selgin, George. (2010)."The Futility of Central Banking". Cato Journal
- Selgin, George. (2010). "Mere Quibbles: Bagus and Howden's Critique of the Theory of Free Banking". Review of Austrian Economics
- Selgin, George. (2010). "Central Banks as Sources of Financial Instability". The Independent Review
- Selgin, George. (2009). "The Institutional Roots of Great Britain's 'Big Problem of Small Change'." European Review of Economic History
- Selgin, George and Turner, John. (2009). "Watt, Again? Boldrin and Levine Still Exaggerate the Adverse Effects of Patents on the Progress of Steam Power." Review of Law and Economics
- Selgin, George. (2009). "100 Percent Reserve Money: The Small Change Challenge." Quarterly Journal of Austrian Economics
- Selgin, George. (2008)."Milton Friedman and the Case against Currency Monopoly". Cato Journal
- Selgin, George and VanHoose, D.. (2007). "The Euro and World Inflation." Oxford Economic Papers
- Selgin, George and Turner, John. (2006). "James Watt as Intellectual Monopolist: Comment on Boldrin and Levine." International Economics Review
- Selgin, George and White, Lawrence. (2005). "Credible Currency: A Constitutionalist Perspective." Constitutional Political Economy
- Selgin, George. (2005). "Charles Wyatt, Manager of the Parys Mine Mint: A Study in Ingratitude." British Numismatic Journal
- Selgin, George. (2005)."Currency Privatization as a Substitute for Currency Boards and Dollarization". Cato Journal
- Selgin, George. (2004). "Wholesale Payments: Questioning the Market-Failure Hypothesis." International Review of Law and Economics
- Selgin, George. (2003). "Steam, Hot Air, and Small Change: Matthew Boulton and the Reform of Britain's Coinage." The Economic History Review
- Selgin, George. (2003). "Adaptive Learning and the Transition to Fiat Money." The Economic Journal
- Selgin, George. (2001). "In-Concert Overexpansion and the Precautionary Demand for Bank Reserves." Journal of Money, Credit, and Banking
- Selgin, George. (2001)."You Call That Deregulation? A Critical Examination of Hugh Thomas's Proposal to Deregulate Banking". Cato Journal
- Selgin, George. (2000). "The Suppression of State Bank Notes: A Reconsideration." Economic Inquiry
- Selgin, George. (1999). "Hayek versus Keynes on How the Price Level Ought to Behave." History of Political Economy
- Selgin, George and Taylor, Jason. (1999). "By Our Bootstraps: Origins and Effects of the High-Wage Doctrine"Journal of Labor Research
- Selgin, George and White, Lawrence. (1999). "A Fiscal Theory of Governments' Role in Money"Economic Inquiry
- Selgin, George. (2000)."World Monetary Policy After The Echo". Cato Journal
- Selgin, George. (1999)."Ludwig von Mises and the Case for Gold". Cato Journal
- Selgin, George. (1999). "A Plea for (Mild) Deflation". Cato Journal
- Selgin, George. (1997). "A Regulatory Placebo? Or, the Strange Case of Dr. Kaufman and Mr. Seir". Cato Journal
- Selgin, George and Lastrapes, William. (1997). "The Check Tax: Fiscal Folly and the Great Monetary Contraction" Journal of Economic History
- Selgin, George and White, Lawrence. (1997). "The Option Clause in Scottish Banking" Journal of Money, Credit, and Banking
- Selgin, George. (1996). "Salvaging Gresham's Law: the Good, the Bad, and the Illegal." Journal of Money, Credit, and Banking
- Selgin, George and White, Lawrence. (1996). "In Defense of Fiduciary Media" Review of Austrian Economics
- Selgin, George and Foldvary, Fred. (1995). "The Dependency of Wage Contracts on Monetary Policy" Journal of Institutional and Theoretical Economics
- Selgin, George. (1995). "The Case for a 'Productivity Norm': Comment on Dowd." Journal of Macroeconomics
- Selgin, George. (1995). "The 'Productivity Norm' vs. Zero Inflation in the History of Economic Thought." History of Political Economy
- Selgin, George and Lastrapes, William. (1995). "The Liquidity Effect: Identifying Short-Run Interest Rate Dynamics using Long-Run Restrictions" Journal of Macroeconomics
- Selgin, George. (1995). "Bank Self-Regulation: Comment on Bordo and Schwartz". Cato Journal
- Selgin, George and White, Lawrence. (1994). "How Would the Invisible Hand Handle Money?" Journal of Economic Literature
- Selgin, George. (1994). "Free Banking and Monetary Control." Economic Journal
- Selgin, George and White, Lawrence. (1994). "Monetary Reform and the Redemption of National Bank Notes, 1863–1913" Business History Review
- Selgin, George. (1994). "On Ensuring the Acceptability of a New Fiat Money." Journal of Money, Credit, and Banking
- Selgin, George and Lastrapes, William. (1994). "Buffer-Stock Money: Interpreting Short-Run Dynamics Using Long-Run Restrictions" Journal of Money, Credit, and Banking
- Selgin, George. (1994). "Are Banking Crises Free-Market Phenomena?" Critical Review
- Selgin, George. (1994). "Banking is Different, Because it is Regulated." Cato Journal
- Selgin, George. (1993). "In Defense of Bank Suspension." Journal of Financial Services Research
- Selgin, George. (1992). "On Foot-Loose Prices and Forecast-Free Monetary Regimes." Cato Journal
- Selgin, George. (1992). "Bank Lending 'Manias' in Theory and History." Journal of Financial Services Research
- Selgin, George and White, Lawrence. (1990). "Laissez‑Faire Monetary Theorists in Late Nineteenth Century America" Southern Economic Journal
- Selgin, George and Boudreaux, Don. (1990). "L. Albert Hahn: Precursor of Keynesianism and the 'Monetarist Counterrevolution'" History of Political Economy
- Selgin, George and White, Lawrence. (1990). "Laissez‑Faire Monetary Thought in Jacksonian America" Perspectives on the History of Economic Thought
- Selgin, George. (1990). "Why Does Europe Want a Federal Reserve System?" Cato Journal
- Selgin, George. (1990). "Monetary Equilibrium and the Productivity Norm of Price-Level Policy". Cato Journal
- Selgin, George. (1989). "Legal Restrictions, Financial Weakening, and the Lender of Last Resort". Cato Journal
- Selgin, George. (1989). "The Analytical Framework of the Real‑Bills Doctrine." Journal of Institutional and Theoretical Economics
- Selgin, George. (1989). "Commercial Banks as Pure Intermediaries: Between 'Old' and 'New' Views." Southern Economic Journal
- Selgin, George. (1989). "Legal Restrictions, Financial Weakening, and the Lender of Last Resort." Cato Journal
- Selgin, George. (1988). "The Stability and Efficiency of Money Supply under Free Banking." Journal of Institutional and Theoretical Economics
- Selgin, George. (1988). "Praxeology and Understanding." Review of Austrian Economics
- Selgin, George and White, Lawrence. (1988). "Competitive Monies and the Suffolk System: Comment" Southern Economic Journal
- Selgin, George. (1988)."Central Banking: Myth and Reality." Hong Kong Economic Papers
- Selgin, George. (1988). "Accommodating Changes in the Relative Demand for Currency: Free Banking vs. Central Banking". Cato Journal
- Selgin, George and White, Lawrence. (1987). "The Evolution of a Free Banking System." Economic Inquiry

=== Popular Essays ===
Apart from his scholarly writings, Selgin has written numerous opinion pieces for newspapers and magazines, including The Wall Street Journal, FT Magazine, The Christian Science Monitor, and American Banker," as well as hundreds of essays for the former blog, Alt-M," most of which are now archived at the Cato Institute's "Cato at Liberty" blog.
