= Saambou =

Defunct South African bank

Saambou Bank
- Formerly: Saambou (Permanente) Bouvereniging
- Company type: Public limited company
- Traded as: Previously JSE: SBO
- Industry: Banking
- Predecessor: Unie Bouvereniging and Nasionale Bouvereniging
- Founded: 1942; 83 years ago
- Defunct: 2006
- Fate: Liquidated after bankruptcy
- Headquarters: South Africa
- Area served: South Africa
- Products: Banking services

Saambou Bank was a South African bank that was founded in 1942 and was liquidated in 2006. At the time it went into receivership, Saambou Bank was the sixth-largest bank in the country.

== History ==
=== Foundation and development ===
The bank was founded on June 12, 1942 under the name Unie Bouvereniging. Shortly afterwards, the company took the name Saambou (Permanente) Bouvereniging. In 1970 it merged with Nasionale Bouvereniging, creating Saambou Nasionale Bouvereniging. They went public as Saambou Beherend in 1987 and traded under the name Saambou Bank.

=== 2002 - Bankruptcy ===
The bank went into bankruptcy in February 2002 after newspaper articles speculated about it being bankrupt and customers withdrew R1 billion in two days. At the time it went into receivership, Saambou was the sixth-largest bank in the country. The JSE Limited stopped trading in its shares that same year, and First National Bank (South Africa) took over some of its mortgage business.

=== 2006 - Liquidation ===
The bank was finally liquidated in 2006. A dividend of R7.568 billion, or 4.53c per share, was paid out to shareholders. The share had traded at 203c per share before the bankruptcy.
