= Vision 2020 for Science =

Program in South Carolina

Vision 2020 or Vision 2020 for Science is a program in South Carolina that was formed to reshape Roper Mountain Science Center into an "alluring science education facility, one that is state of the art for science and learning, one that is exciting and rigorous, and one that appeals to range of K-12 students."

== Start of the program ==
The founders of this project are Tammy and Jerry Barber. They created this program with the belief that the students of today should be the designers of their own future. The idea was submitted to the Greenville County School District. Teachers voted on students that they thought would be the best for program. Out of those students, 12 were selected for the program by applications. Later they added 2 people to document the program to create a video showing what the students had done. Also they selected alternates in case of a student not being able to come.

== People involved ==
The people involved in Vision 2020 are split into two teams: The Adult Team and the Design Team. The Design Team is made up of the 12 students while the adult team is made up of a few people that agreed to supervise and help the Design Team. The Design Team consist of student of different skills. These skills include:

- Mediator/diplomat
- High grades in science
- High grades in math
- Artist (creative writer)
- Artist (visual/digital media)
- Technologically savvy
- Street smart
- Entrepreneur
- Natural born leader
- Highly social
