= Twenty Twenty (band) =

British band

- Origin: London, Cambridge and Essex in England
- Genres: Pop rock; pop punk; pop; rock; power pop
- Years active: 2008–2014
- Labels: Geffen Records; PolyGram Records; Universal Music Group
- Past members: Sam Halliday; Jack Halliday; Sonny Watson-Lang
- Website: www.twentytwentyband.com

Twenty Twenty were a British pop rock band based in London, Cambridge and Essex in England. They are made up of lead vocalist/guitarist Sam Halliday, brother and bassist/vocalist Jack Halliday, and drummer/vocalist Sonny Watson-Lang. The band have supported acts such as The Wanted, The Saturdays, Avril Lavigne, Scouting for Girls, Big Time Rush and Selena Gomez. Festival appearances have included playing with JLS, Diversity, and McFly. July 2010 saw the band play at the O2 Arena with The Saturdays, and Tinchy Stryder. In early 2011 Twenty Twenty supported The Saturdays on a UK tour throughout February and March and supported The Wanted in March and April. 17 April 2011 saw the release of the band's new single and their first release signed to a major label. Their debut album "Small Talk" was released on 2 May 2011.

On 10 January 2014, Sam and Jack Halliday officially announced the band's split on the sugarscape website, after drummer Sonny Watson-Lang's departure from the band six months earlier.

== Beginning ==
Sam and Jack Halliday were originally in a band called 'AtianA'. Their drummer dropped out to go to university, leaving Sam and Jack to find a replacement drummer. A friend of theirs recommended Sonny, and they called him down for a few trials. They got along straight away, and from then on Sonny has been the permanent drummer. The band members came together in the final months of 2008 and formed the name Twenty Twenty in February 2009, where they performed their first live show at the Barhouse in Chelmsford. They toured extensively as a support act and also as a headline act, where they have sold out venues throughout the UK. The group are particularly known for their active online presence across popular social network sites, which has helped enable them to gain a large viral following.

== Early releases ==
The band self-released two EPs, Forever and Raise Your Hands, available to fans at live shows in 2009.

== Releases ==
May 2010 saw the band release, on Brilliant/Cohort records and via mainstream distribution, "Get Down Live with Twenty Twenty", which reached No.4 in the 'Official DVD Music Chart'.

On 4 July 2010, their first official single "World's Apart", which reached No. 72 in the UK Singles Chart, No. 2 in the 'Official Indie Breakers Chart', and No. 8 in the UK Indie Singles Chart.

17 April 2011, the band released a new single called "Love to Life". It entered the UK Singles Chart at No. 60. On 2 May 2011, the band released their first album called Small Talk. It entered the UK Albums Chart at No. 26. On 23 October 2011, the band released "Move It". On 18 August, the band released the video on YouTube. On 30 September 2012, the band released their next single "Trouble". It reached No. 9 in the iTunes Rock Charts. On 28 October 2012, the band released their second album 25th Hour.

== Previous members ==
- Sam Halliday
- Jack Halliday
- Sonny Watson-Lang

Sonny Watson-Lang officially left the band through an announcement on the Facebook page of the band on 2 August 2013.

On 10 January 2014 it was announced that the band would not be continuing and all February 2014 tour dates had been cancelled.

== Discography ==
=== Studio albums ===
| Title | Album details | Peak chart positions |
| Title | Album details | UK |
|---|---|---|
| Small Talk | Released: 25 April 2011; Label: Geffen Records; Formats: CD, digital download | 26 |
| 25th Hour | Released: 28 October 2012; Label: TT; Formats: CD, digital download | — |

=== Extended plays ===
- Forever (2009)
- Raise Your Hands (2009)
- Worlds Apart (2010)

=== Singles ===
| Single | Year | Chart positions | Album |
| Single | Year | UK | Album |
|---|---|---|---|
| "Forever" | 2009 | — | |
| "Story of Our Lives" | 2009 | — | |
| "Worlds Apart" | 2010 | 72 | |
| "Love to Life" | 2011 | 60 | Small Talk |
| "Move It" | 2011 | — | |
| "Trouble" | 2012 | 9 (iTunes Rock Chart) | 25th Hour |
