= 2020 (miniseries) =

- Genre: Science fiction/Thriller
- Created by: Rik Ferguson; Katarzyna Kieliszek; Wojciech Jeżowski; Krzysztof Krzysztofiak
- Written by: Donovan Cerminara; Filip Luft; Rik Ferguson
- Directed by: Wojciech Jeżowski
- Starring: Mohamed Zouaoui; Rebecca Kiser; Philip Lenkowsky; Jim High; David Wurawa; James McNeill; Ricardia Bramley; Rik Ferguson
- Country of origin: Poland
- Original language: English
- No. of seasons: 1
- No. of episodes: 9

Production
- Executive producers: Rik Ferguson; Katarzyna Kieliszek
- Producers: Wojciech Jeżowski; Krzysztof Krzysztofiak
- Production locations: Warsaw, Poland; Vancouver, British Columbia, Canada
- Cinematography: Bastien Loiseau-Majewski
- Editor: Wojciech Lebkowski
- Camera setup: Single-camera
- Running time: 4-8 minutes
- Production companies: Trend Micro; Black Rabbit Productions

Original release
- Network: YouTube
- Release: October 1 – November 26, 2013

2020: The Series (often referred to as simply 2020) is a web series produced by Wojciech Jeżowski and Krzysztof Krzysztofiak and created by Rik Ferguson, Katarzyna Ferguson, Wojciech Jeżowski and Krzysztof Krzysztofiak.

The series is a story set in the near future based on the White Paper "Project 2020: Scenarios for the future of Cybercrime" published by the ICSPA, Europol and Trend Micro. 2020: The Series premiered on October 1, 2013 on the Trend Micro channel on YouTube. New episodes were then released every week on Tuesdays until the season finale on November 26, 2013. This video project takes the form of a fictional web series presenting the evolution of society and technology in the world described by the report.

== Production ==
The series began as a project in January 2013. It was filmed in Warsaw, Poland and Vancouver, British Columbia, Canada in June/July 2013, over 7 days, and announced at a press conference in London on September 25, 2013 .

Supplemental content was also made available through the series' official website, providing extra images, text, and the ISCPA white paper, that tied into the story further.

== Background ==
The story takes place in a fictitious country in Central Europe; The Republic of South Sylvania. It is technologically, the most advanced country in the region, home to the best Digital Design University in the world, premier nano-technology research and is the crossroads of the main fibre optic lines flowing through the continent.

Every citizen uses multiple profiles in their everyday life. Their official profile, replacing the ID card, allows them to pay taxes, claim benefits, and pay parking fines or any other activities requiring official identification. Other profiles are used depending on the individual's activity or mood. One may be used for social interactions, one for shopping, one for gaming, one for family and friends and one or more for various financial transactions.

As the South Sylvanian consumer has fully embraced the digital world, nearly all advertising and marketing is now delivered through digital channels and perfectly tailored to individual interests, thanks to the Content Service Provider industry. Fixed advertising such as billboards is a thing of the past. South Sylvanians experience life through the filter of the Content Service Provider; everything is created for each potential customer individually in the augmented reality word. A centralised and highly secure hub, commonly known as The Switch, ensures that, when a citizen switches profile, every individual provides the right level of biometric authentication to assert their entitlement to assume one of their digital identities.

Everyone wears either digital contact lenses or glasses, which provide a Head-up Display overlaying the digital onto the real world around them, the concept of being “offline” has become anathema in South Sylvania. Digital content is modified and crafted for every individual based on consumer preferences and mood data that is being constantly collected by thousands of sensors, embedded in wearable tech, through Internet Service Providers and in the physical world.

We meet our heroes on an auspicious day, the day before the first all-digital national parliamentary elections are due to be held, facilitated of course by Switch technology, a Public/Private Initiative. To vote, a person must be using their official profile. Without warning and for no apparent cause the entire Switch system suffers a significant malfunction resulting in national chaos. People cannot switch from their currently engaged profile to any other: surgeons are not allowed into the operating theatre because they cannot present their official credentials, citizens are unable to access pharmacy facilities, employees can no longer remotely access their corporate facilities and the financial system grinds to a halt. At the same time the country undergoes a wave of massive Denial of Service attacks aimed at crippling critical national infrastructure. Casualties are mounting; the authorities are trying desperately to discover what is happening and crucially, who is behind it.

== Cast and characters ==
- Mohamed Zouaoui as Yanek Novack
- Rebecca Kiser as Sandra Kowalski

== Episodes ==
No.	Title	Original release date
1	"Switched Off"	October 1, 2013
An introduction to South Sylvania, on the eve of its first digital election, just as The Switch goes down. Runtime 5:08.
2	"Stay Calm"	October 8, 2013
The country is in chaos as services shut down and Denial of Service attacks continue. Runtime 4:05
3	"We Didn’t See It Coming"	November 5, 2013
Yanek recruits his idealistic hacktivist dupe, Adam. Kinuko is arrested. Runtime 4:12
4	"Have You Seen This Boy?"	November 12, 2013
The link between Adam and Kinuko is discovered. Runtime 4:26
5	"In It All the Way"	November 19, 2013
Adam discovers the truth about Yanek. Runtime 5:31
6	"Hacktivist"	November 26, 2013
Carrington is desperate for a resolution. Runtime 4:19
7	"Keep It Offline"	December 10, 2013
Kinuko is released and Adam gets a shock. Runtime 7:00
8	"Someone to Lynch"	January 7, 2014
Adam gets hung out to dry while Yanek gets a personal visit. Runtime 3:55
9	"Curiosity’s Claws"	January 14, 2014
The climax, finally discover the truth behind everything. Runtime 7:50

== Reception ==
The Register described the series as "The production values for the videos, starring professional actors, are very high and the overall feel from the preview was reminiscent of spy and torture serial 24"

USA Today wrote, "Take-downs of critical national infrastructure, identity theft on a grand scale and political mayhem incited by a low-level programmer all factor in."

PC Magazine wrote "Cuing in the ominous music, the first episode sets up the most frightening scenario possible: an anonymous, massive cyber attack that causes a malfunction in The Switch."

2020: The Series was shortlisted as a finalist in the 2014 Shorty Awards and has won several creative industry awards including the Gold Award in the category "Web: Business to Consumer", the Grand Award in the category "Web" and the overall Grand Prix in the intermedia WorldMediaFestival 2014
