= 20:20 (album) =

Box set by Ryan Adams
- Released: Unreleased
- Genre: Alternative country
- Producer: Various

20:20 was a planned box set release by singer-songwriter Ryan Adams, rumored to have a scheduled release in late 2007. Adams stated that the box set would include albums that he "really wanted to be records".

== Background ==
According to Adams, the box set was to include five unreleased albums: The Suicide Handbook, 48 Hours, Pink Hearts, Darkbreaker and Black Hole. Adams stated that the five albums would be: "collected into a box-set called 20:20. There'll also be a couple of disks, one of rare stuff that nobody has heard and one of b-sides from all the singles that we made. It will be interesting to get all that stuff in one place."

Cardinals member and frequent collaborator, James Candiloro, was said to be compiling the box set, while author Stephen King wrote the liner notes.

As of 2026, the box set remains unreleased.

== The albums ==
Ryan has stated that The Suicide Handbook was made for Lost Highway as the follow-up to Heartbreaker and called it his "most majestic piece ever". 48 Hours was recorded after Gold in forty-eight hours, hence the title, and is in the country rock genre. Pink Hearts, or The Pink Hearts Sessions, is named for his "Nashville Punk" band The Pink Hearts with whom he toured Gold. Darkbreaker was made in L.A. after Jacksonville City Nights (2005) and is, according to Adams, the sound of him "falling apart". The album contains songs that were recorded for the Cameron Crowe movie Elizabethtown but not used. The final album to be included was Black Hole which Adams called "a real serious effort to make a rock record" and confirms that it was the last album he recorded "in the last days of the drugs". Adams told the NME in 2014 that the album was a "really cool" composite of two recorded versions of the album and was considering releasing it for Record Store Day 2015. In the end Adams did not follow this plan through, re-releasing "Come Pick Me Up" instead.
