= Clare Selgin Wolfowitz =

American anthropologist (born 1945)

Clare Selgin Wolfowitz (born November 1945) is an American anthropologist with a specialism in Indonesia. She currently works at the IRIS center at the University of Maryland, College Park in the Governance Institutions Group, primarily on its projects in Indonesia and with the Programs and Policy Coordination office of USAID. She also currently serves as a board member for Health In Harmony, a nonprofit organization based in Portland, Oregon that supports environmental conservation and health projects in Indonesia. Her first stay in Indonesia was as an American Field Service (AFS) exchange student in the summer of 1962.

In 1968 she married Paul Wolfowitz, who became United States Deputy Secretary of Defense (2001–2005) and subsequently President of the World Bank Group. They had met while they were studying together at Cornell University in the mid-1960s and co-residing in the Telluride House. There are conflicting reports of their marital status. They have been reported as divorcing in 2002. They have three children.

She is the half-sister of author, playwright, and illustrator Peter Selgin and economist George Selgin.

== Books ==
- Language Style and Social Space: Stylistic Choice in Suriname Javanese (University of Illinois Press, 1991)
