= Joint Vision 2020 =

Joint Vision 2020 was a document released on May 30, 2000, by the United States Department of Defense proclaiming the need for "full-spectrum dominance" on the battlefield. The Joint Vision 2020 concepts have subsequently formed the basis of United States military doctrine.

The document envisages the military threats that might confront the United States in the year 2020 and possible responses to these threats. Information operations were a primary focus of the document, as well as the rapidly-accelerating pace of technological development.

== See also ==
- Network-centric warfare
