= Hugh S. Cumming =

American physician and soldier

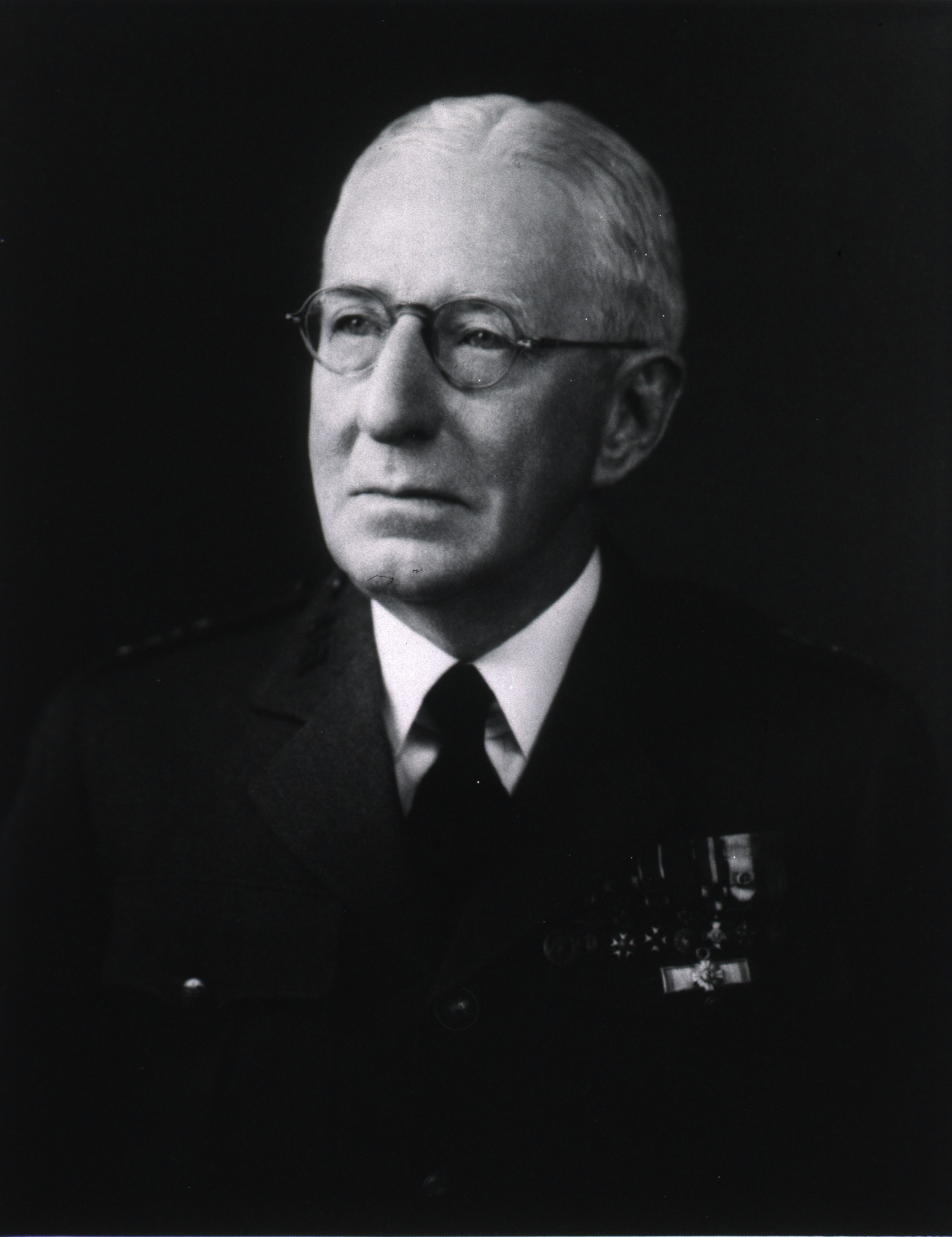

5th Surgeon General of the United States
- In office March 3, 1920 – January 31, 1936
- President: Woodrow Wilson; Warren G. Harding; Calvin Coolidge; Herbert Hoover; Franklin D. Roosevelt
- Preceded by: Rupert Blue
- Succeeded by: Thomas Parran Jr.

Personal details
- Born: Hugh Smith Cumming; August 17, 1869 Hampton, Virginia, U.S.
- Died: December 20, 1948 (aged 79) Washington, D.C., U.S.
- Education: Baltimore City College; University of Virginia

Military service
- Allegiance: United States
- Branch/service: Public Health Service
- Years of service: 1894–1936
- Rank: Rear Admiral

Hugh Smith Cumming (August 17, 1869 – December 20, 1948) was an American physician and soldier. He served as the fifth Surgeon General of the United States from 1920 to 1936. The Tuskegee syphilis experiment began under his term in 1932 and continued for 40 years.

A collection of his papers are held at the National Library of Medicine.

== Biography ==
=== Early life ===
Cumming was born in Hampton, Virginia. He received his high school education at Baltimore City College and then obtained medical degrees in two years from the University of Virginia School of Medicine in 1893, where he was a member of Chi Phi fraternity, and the University College of Medicine (in Richmond, Virginia) in 1894 (the latter while serving as house doctor at St. Luke's Hospital in Richmond). In 1894, he obtained a commission as an Assistant Surgeon in the Marine Hospital Service, which was to become the Public Health Service and Marine Hospital Service in 1902 and then the Public Health Service in 1912.

=== Career ===
Cumming was assigned to a variety of posts during his early career in the Service, especially quarantine stations in the South and on the West Coast of the United States. He also served on immigration duty at Ellis Island, New York. For 3 years, from February 1906 to February 1909, Cumming was detailed to the office of the United States Consul General in Yokohama, Japan, where he was concerned with immigration and quarantinable diseases. From 1913 to 1919, he was assigned to the Hygienic Laboratory (forerunner of the National Institutes of Health) in Washington, DC. There he was placed in charge of an investigation of the pollution of tidal waters of Maryland and Virginia. One of his concerns was the shellfish industry, and the potential threat to human health from consuming oysters grown in waters polluted with sewage.

During World War I, Cumming was assigned to the United States Navy as a sanitary advisor. He was later ordered to Europe to study the sanitary conditions of the ports from which troops would embark and to confer with military authorities to take the necessary action to prevent the introduction of disease into the United States by returning troops. He was also a member of the Typhus Fever Commission to Poland.

==== Surgeon General ====
On 3 March 1920, Cumming was appointed Surgeon General of the United States Public Health Service. The Public Health Service (PHS) had been given the task in 1919 of providing health care for veterans, and the Service was still expanding and adjusting to this new responsibility when Cumming took office. In 1922, however, Congress created the Veterans' Bureau, and the responsibility for the health care of veterans was transferred from the PHS to the new Bureau. Another event of Cumming's early tenure was the creation of a national leprosy hospital in Carville, Louisiana in 1921 when the PHS took control of what had been the Louisiana Leper Home. The facility at Carville became a major center for leprosy treatment and research.

Soon after his appointment, Cumming inaugurated a plan for the medical inspection of immigrants abroad in the principal countries of origin. This plan reduced the number of immigrants who were turned back for medical reasons after making the trip to the United States. In the 1920s, the PHS also completed the development of a national maritime quarantine system by acquiring the last two quarantine stations operated by States.

In May 1925, Cumming presided over a Public Health Service symposium on tetraethyl lead gasoline developed by Ethyl Corporation and General Motors. Cumming gave precedence to the industry speakers, including Charles Kettering, Thomas Midgley, and Robert Kehoe. Alice Hamilton of Harvard and Yandell Henderson of Yale spoke later and were largely unsuccessful in convincing the government to prohibit leaded gasoline.

The Narcotic Farms Act of 1929 authorized the PHS to establish a Division of Narcotics (the name was later changed to Division of Mental Hygiene) and to construct two hospitals for the treatment of drug addicts. Cumming also expanded the research activities of the Hygienic Laboratory, which in 1930 became the National Institute of Health. Under Cumming, the Public Health Service Commissioned Corps was also authorized to admit dentists, pharmacists, and sanitary engineers, the first expansion of the Regular Corps beyond physicians.

In 1930, the PHS was given the responsibility of providing medical and psychiatric care to Federal prisoners. Under the Social Security Act of 1935, the PHS was authorized to provide grants-in-aid to the States for the development of public health work.

Cumming served as President of the Association of Military Surgeons of the United States in 1924 and as President of the American Public Health Association in 1931. In 1931 Cumming initiated "The Tuskegee study of untreated syphilis in the negro male"—begun in 1932, continued under Cumming's successors, ended in 1972. Cumming was also on the Advisory Board of the Eugenics Committee of the USA (ECUSA).

In 1935 Cumming was awarded the Public Welfare Medal from the National Academy of Sciences.

==== International Office of Public Hygiene ====
While he was Surgeon General, Cumming attended several meetings of the International Office of Public Health (OIHP) in Paris, the predecessor of the World Health Organization.

After ending his term as Surgeon-General, Cumming served for a period as Chairman of the Permanent Committee of the OIHP.

=== Personal life ===
His brother, Samuel Gordon Cumming, was killed by his ex-wife, Mittie Ann Jester. She shot him on February 7, 1920, and he died two days later. Although the fact of the shooting was not in dispute, two months later she was acquitted of the murder charge and was freed, having been found not responsible due to her mental state.

Hugh Cumming retired as Surgeon General and from active duty in the Public Health Service on 31 January 1936 as a rear admiral. He continued to serve as Director of the Pan American Sanitary Bureau until 1947. He died in Washington, DC, on 20 December 1948.

His son, Hugh S. Cumming Jr., was a career Foreign Service Officer who served as United States Ambassador to Indonesia.
