= Richard H. Solomon =

American diplomat (1937–2017)

Richard Solomon
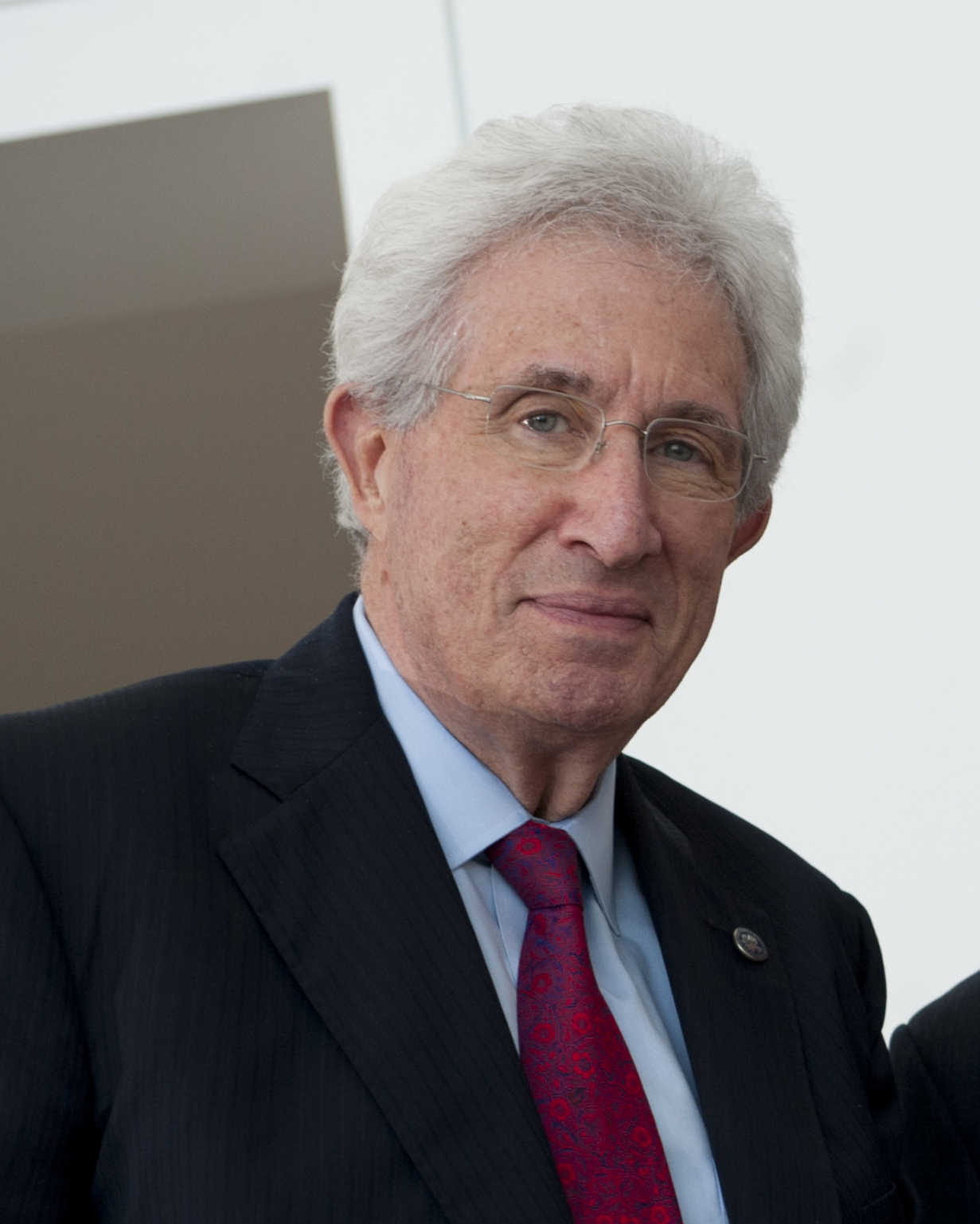

United States Ambassador to the Philippines
- In office September 4, 1992 – March 1, 1993
- President: George H. W. Bush
- Preceded by: Frank G. Wisner
- Succeeded by: John Negroponte

18th Assistant Secretary of State for East Asian and Pacific Affairs
- In office June 23, 1989 – July 10, 1992
- President: George H. W. Bush
- Preceded by: Gaston J. Sigur Jr.
- Succeeded by: William Clark, Jr.

15th Director of Policy Planning
- In office March 3, 1986 – January 21, 1989
- President: Ronald Reagan
- Preceded by: Peter Rodman
- Succeeded by: Dennis B. Ross

Personal details
- Born: Richard Harvey Solomon; June 19, 1937 Philadelphia, Pennsylvania, U.S.
- Died: March 13, 2017 (aged 79) Bethesda, Maryland, U.S.
- Education: Massachusetts Institute of Technology (S.B., Ph.D.)

Richard Harvey Solomon (June 19, 1937 – March 13, 2017) was an American diplomat and academic.

A scholar of Chinese politics, Solomon was a faculty member at the University of Michigan before joining the National Security Council under the Richard Nixon administration. He left the NSC in 1976 to join the RAND Corporation as head of its political science department, where he remained until returning to government service in 1986.

He served as director of policy planning in the Department of State from 1986 to 1989, assistant secretary of state for East Asian and Pacific affairs from 1989 to 1992, and U.S. ambassador to the Philippines from 1992 to 1993.

In September 1993, he became president of the United States Institute of Peace, a position he held until his retirement in September 2012. He subsequently returned to the RAND Corporation as a senior fellow and remained there until his death in 2017.

== Early life and education ==
Richard Harvey Solomon was born in Philadelphia, Pennsylvania, on June 19, 1937. His family background is of German and French Jewish émigrés who settled in the eastern United States around the turn of the 20th century. Previous generations of Solomon's family included salesmen of German silver, distinguished academics including Milton J. Rosenau, and an art dealer who funded Pierre-Auguste Renoir and other Impressionist artists. Solomon's maternal grandfather successfully managed a knitting mill during the Second World War and supported Solomon's high school and university education after the death of his father.

Solomon's father, a furniture salesman who also served in the United States Coast Guard, died from a pulmonary embolism resulting from an operation at the age of 37 in 1945. His mother took up the same profession after the death of Solomon's father.

Solomon was sent to study at the Westtown School at the age of 12 and graduated from high school in the spring of 1955. He later credited Westtown for encouraging his interest in public affairs and entering a career in public service. In the summer of 1953, at the age of 15, Solomon was part of a Quaker work camp in California and other parts of the west, where he worked with a group of Russian émigrés, contributing to his interest in public and international affairs, which he recalled as being much more attractive than the business environment in which he was raised.

Solomon's strong record in the sciences and his early interest in photography led him to enroll at the Massachusetts Institute of Technology in the fall of 1955. Solomon entered MIT to study chemistry, but having not enjoyed science, Solomon left in the middle of his third year with a colleague to hitchhike around Europe for nine months. He returned to finish his studies and received a bachelor's degree in chemistry in 1960 after completing an undergraduate thesis titled "Aerial photography, a research tool for the social sciences."

Solomon remained at MIT for graduate studies and developed his interest in China under the influence of Lucian Pye. After a call from Walt Rostow seeking a China analyst, Pye enabled Solomon to acquire a scholarship to study at the Air Force program in Chinese language studies at Yale University in the summer of 1961.

With the support of a Ford Foundation fellowship and research grants from MIT and the University of Michigan, Solomon conducted research for his dissertation in Taiwan and Hong Kong from 1964 to 1965. He also continued his language studies at Harvard University and National Taiwan University. While conducting research in Hong Kong, Solomon befriended figures who would later become influential figures in American diplomacy, such as Morton Abramowitz, William Gleysteen, and Nicholas Platt.

For his dissertation, Solomon interviewed over a hundred Chinese refugees in Hong Kong and Taiwan, and received his Ph.D. in political science in 1966 after completing a dissertation on Chinese political culture under the supervision of Pye.

== Career ==
In 1966, Solomon became a professor of political science at the University of Michigan. He left in 1971 to become a staff member of the United States National Security Council, responsible for Asian Affairs. In this position, he worked with then-National Security Advisor Henry Kissinger on the normalization of relations with China.

In 1976, he joined the Rand Corporation in Santa Monica, California as head of the political science department, a position he held until 1986. Solomon then joined the United States Department of State in 1986 as Director of Policy Planning, serving until 1989.

On March 24, 1989, President of the United States George H. W. Bush nominated Solomon as Assistant Secretary of State for East Asian and Pacific Affairs serving from June 23, 1989 until July 10, 1992. As Assistant Secretary, Solomon helped negotiate the 1991 Paris Peace Agreements, by which the Vietnam-backed People's Republic of Kampuchea agreed to turn over control of Cambodia to the United Nations Transitional Authority in Cambodia, an international peacekeeping force (with Cambodia gaining independence in 1995). Solomon also facilitated nuclear proliferation discussions between North Korea and South Korea. He played a role in the formation of the Asia-Pacific Economic Cooperation initiative. He also participated in bilateral negotiations with Vietnam, Mongolia, and Japan.

In 1990, Solomon was offered the opportunity to succeed James R. Lilley as U.S. ambassador to China but turned it down due to the immobilization of the U.S.-China relationship in the aftermath of the Tiananmen Square massacre.

President George H. W. Bush nominated Solomon as United States Ambassador to the Philippines. He was confirmed and served in that role from September 4, 1992 until March 1, 1993.

Solomon left government service in 1993, becoming president of the United States Institute of Peace. He served in that role until September 2012. In October of that year he returned to the RAND Corporation as a senior fellow.

Solomon published eight books, including "Mao's Revolution and the Chinese Political Culture" (1971, 1999), "A Revolution is Not a Dinner Party" (1975), "The China Factor" (1981), "Chinese Negotiating Behavior" (1985 and 2000), "Exiting Indochina" (2000), "American Negotiating Behavior" (2007), and "Peace Building" (2012). He served as a member of Partnership for a Secure America's bipartisan advisory board until his death in 2017. The Partnership is a non-profit organization dedicated to rebuilding the bipartisan center in American foreign policy and national security.

Solomon received the honorary Doctor of Humane Letters (L.H.D.) from Whittier College in 2012.

== Personal life ==
Solomon's first marriage to Carol Schwartz ended in divorce. He was married to his second wife, Anne Greene Keatley Solomon, for 25 years at the time of his death.

Solomon had two children from his first marriage: Lisa Solomon, and former Wall Street Journal reporter Jonathan "Jay" Solomon.

== Death ==
Solomon died on March 13, 2017, at his home in Bethesda, Maryland from brain cancer at the age of 79.

Government offices
| Preceded by Gaston J. Sigur, Jr. | Assistant Secretary of State for East Asian and Pacific Affairs; June 23, 1989 – July 10, 1992 | Succeeded by William Clark, Jr. |
Diplomatic posts
| Preceded by Frank G. Wisner | United States Ambassador to the Philippines; September 4, 1992 – March 1, 1993 | Succeeded by John Negroponte |
