= Graham Parsons =

Graham Parsons may refer to:

- Gram Parsons (1946–1973), American rock musician
- J. Graham Parsons (1907–1991), U.S. diplomat
