= Robert Kehoe =

Robert Kehoe may refer to:

- Robert A. Kehoe (1893–1992), American toxicologist who was the chief medical consultant to Ethyl Corporation
- Bob Kehoe (1928–2017), former American soccer defender
