= Philip C. Habib =

American diplomat (1920–1992)

Amb. Philip Habib
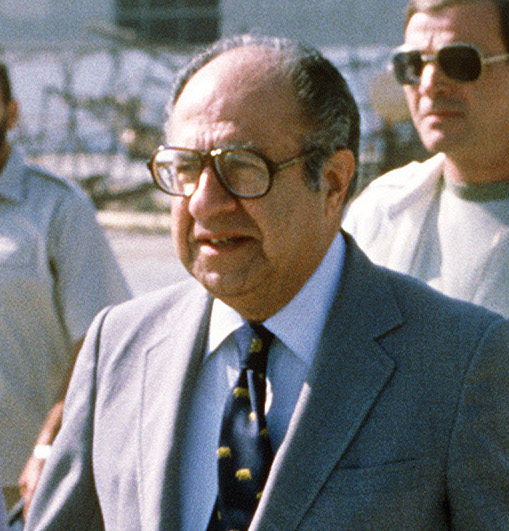
- Habib in Lebanon in December 1982

9th Under Secretary of State for Political Affairs
- In office July 1, 1976 – April 1, 1978
- President: Gerald Ford; Jimmy Carter
- Preceded by: Joseph J. Sisco
- Succeeded by: David D. Newsom

12th Assistant Secretary of State for East Asian and Pacific Affairs
- In office September 27, 1974 – June 30, 1976
- President: Gerald Ford
- Preceded by: Robert S. Ingersoll
- Succeeded by: Arthur W. Hummel Jr.

9th United States Ambassador to South Korea
- In office October 10, 1971 – August 19, 1974
- President: Richard Nixon; Gerald Ford
- Preceded by: William J. Porter
- Succeeded by: Richard Sneider

Personal details
- Born: Philip Charles Habib; February 25, 1920 Brooklyn, New York, U.S.
- Died: May 25, 1992 (aged 72) Puligny-Montrachet, France
- Resting place: Golden Gate National Cemetery
- Spouse: Marjorie W. Slightam (m. 1943)
- Children: 2 daughters
- Education: University of Idaho (B.S.); UC Berkeley (Ph.D.)
- Occupation: Diplomat
- Known for: Shuttle diplomacy
- Awards: President's Award for Distinguished Federal Civilian Service (1979); Medal of Freedom, (Diplomacy, 1982); Légion d'Honneur (France, 1988)

Military service
- Allegiance: United States
- Branch: United States Army
- Service years: 1942–1946
- Rank: Captain
- Conflict: World War II

Philip Charles Habib (February 25, 1920 – May 25, 1992) was an American career diplomat active from 1949 to 1987.

During his 30-year career as a Foreign Service Officer, he had mostly specialized in Asia. In 1968, he was working to prevent the escalation of U.S. involvement in Vietnam.

Habib later became known for his work as Ronald Reagan's special envoy to the Middle East from 1981 to 1983. In that role, he negotiated numerous cease-fire agreements between the various parties involved in the Lebanese Civil War.

He came out of retirement to take two assignments as U.S. special envoy; one to the Philippines in 1986, and another to Central America in 1986–87. In the latter assignment, he helped Costa Rican president Oscar Arias propose a peace plan to end the region's civil wars.

Habib was awarded the Presidential Medal of Freedom in 1982—the highest official honor given to a U.S. citizen by the U.S. government.

== Early life and education ==
Born in Brooklyn, New York, Habib was the son of Lebanese Maronite Catholic parents and was raised in a predominantly Jewish neighborhood of the Bensonhurst section. His father ran a grocery store. Habib graduated from New Utrecht High School in Brooklyn and worked as a shipping clerk before starting his undergraduate study in forestry at the University of Idaho. Habib remained connected to the UI throughout his life; he co-chaired the university's centennial fund-raising campaign several years earlier, as well as several class reunions.

After graduating in 1942 from the UI's College of Forestry (now Natural Resources), he served in the U.S. Army during World War II and attained the rank of captain. Discharged from the service in 1946, Habib continued his education via the G.I. Bill in a doctoral program in agricultural economics at the University of California, Berkeley, and earned a Ph.D. in 1952.

In 1947, recruiters for the United States Foreign Service visited the Berkeley campus. They were particularly interested in candidates who did not fit the then-current mold of Ivy League blueblood WASPs. Habib says he had never given diplomacy a moment's thought, and that he just enjoyed taking tests for intellectual challenge. He took the Foreign Service exam and scored in the top 10% nationally.

== Foreign service career ==
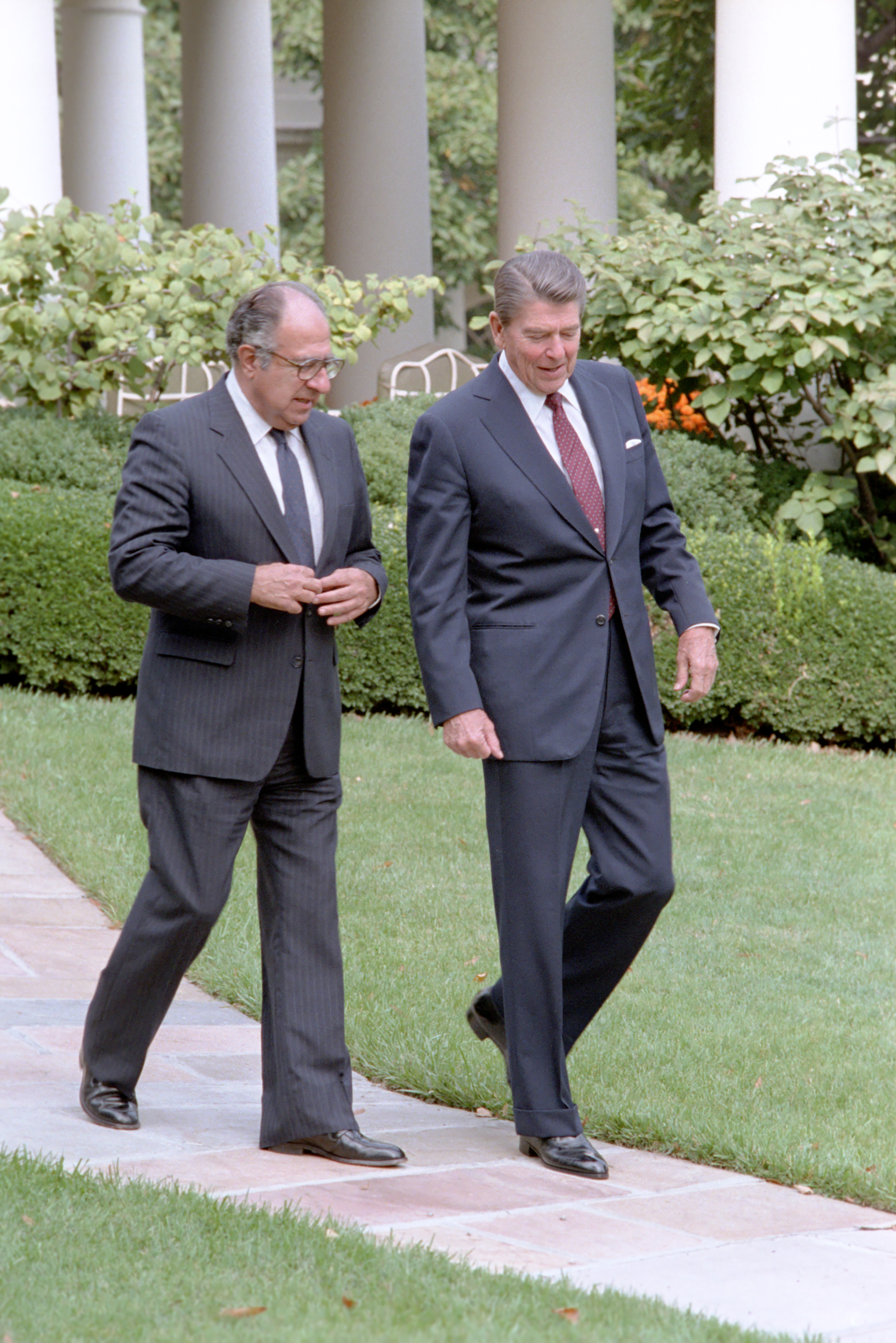
President Ronald Reagan walking with Ambassador Philip Habib in 1982

Beginning in 1949, his foreign service career took him to Canada, New Zealand, South Korea (twice), and South Vietnam. He held the position of Deputy Assistant Secretary of State for East Asian and Pacific Affairs from 1967–1969 and was chief of staff for the U.S. delegation to the Paris Peace Talks from 1968 to 1971. In 1969, he was given the Rockefeller Public Service Award and the National Civil Service League's Career Service Award in 1970. Habib acquired increasingly important posts, serving as Ambassador to South Korea (1971–1974), Assistant Secretary of State for East Asian and Pacific Affairs (1974–1976), and Under Secretary of State for Political Affairs (1976–1978). He was also the one time president of the American Foreign Service Association.

When South Korean opposition leader Kim Dae-jung was kidnapped in 1973 while Habib was U.S. ambassador to South Korea, Habib credits his intervention for saving Kim's life, a sentiment shared by William H. Gleysteen. The CIA station chief in Korea at the time, Donald P. Gregg, remembered that Habib forcefully emphasized to the Park Chung-hee regime that keeping Kim in captivity would damage U.S.–Korean relations. Habib called the kidnapping "stupid governmental thuggery." Kim later became the first opposition leader in South Korea to become president and also won the Nobel Peace Prize in 2000 for his reconciliation efforts with North Korea. Even after returning to Washington, Habib was a powerful advocate for human rights in South Korea. In 1974, Habib was chastised by Secretary of State Henry Kissinger for his continued calls for the end of political repression.

Habib served as Acting Secretary of State in January 1977. He was presented the Distinguished Honor Award by Secretary Henry Kissinger for his "important role in the development of American foreign policy and furthering the county's interests overseas."

In 1978, Habib helped negotiate the Camp David accords. That same year, a massive heart attack forced Habib to resign as Under Secretary, the top post possible for a career Foreign Service Officer. In 1981, President Ronald Reagan called him out of retirement to serve as special envoy to the Middle East. Habib oversaw the negotiations of a peace deal that allowed the PLO to evacuate from the besieged city of Beirut. In 1982, for his efforts he was awarded the Presidential Medal of Freedom—the highest official honor given to a U.S. citizen by the U.S. government.

Early in 1986, Reagan sent Habib to the Philippines to convince President Ferdinand Marcos to a power sharing compromise between him and Cory Aquino. In March 1986, Reagan appointed him as a special envoy to Central America with the intention of furthering U.S. interests in the conflict in Nicaragua. Administration hard-liners intended to use his fame and stature to advance a military solution, namely further funding of the Contras.

Deciding that the Contadora Plan had run its course, Óscar Arias, the newly elected president of Costa Rica, drew up a plan that focused on democratization. While he viewed the Arias plan as riddled with loopholes, Habib worked to help revise it, and promoted it to other Central American governments.

On August 7, 1987, the five Central American presidents, much to the shock of the rest of the world, agreed in principle to the Arias plan. Because further negotiating would require Habib to meet directly with Nicaragua's president, Daniel Ortega, President Reagan forbade him to travel. Believing he no longer had the confidence of the president, Habib resigned.

== Death and legacy ==
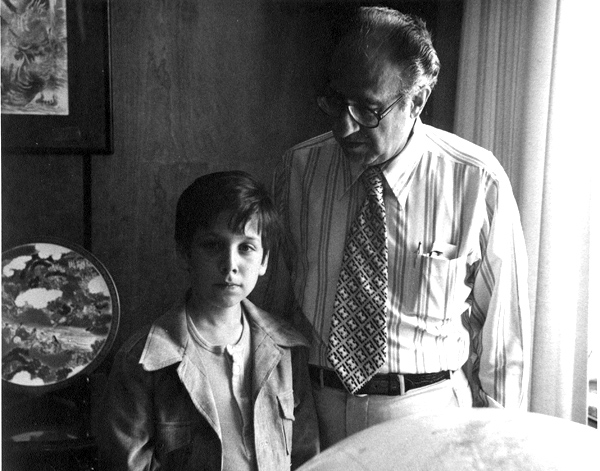
Habib and grand nephew Gregory Cohen in his offices at the State Department in 1976

While on vacation in France in 1992, Habib suffered a cardiac arrhythmia in Puligny-Montrachet and died on May 25 at age 72.

Former Secretary of State George Shultz spoke at his funeral in Belmont, California, and characterized Habib as "...a man who really made a difference." He was buried nearby at the Golden Gate National Cemetery in San Bruno, just south of San Francisco. Speakers at his memorial service in Washington at the National Cathedral the following week included two former Secretaries of State, Henry Kissinger and Cyrus Vance, and a future one, former colleague Lawrence Eagleburger.

In 2006, Habib was featured on a United States postage stamp, one of a block of six featuring prominent diplomats. In 2013, the city of Junieh, Lebanon, unveiled a bust of Habib among other "national heroes" in Friendship Square.

Habib is the subject of the 1982 Warren Zevon song "The Envoy".

Diplomatic posts
| Preceded by William J. Porter | United States Ambassador to South Korea; 1974–1978 | Succeeded by Richard L. Sneider |
Government offices
| Preceded by Robert S. Ingersoll | Assistant Secretary of State for East Asian and Pacific Affairs; September 27, 1974 – June 30, 1976 | Succeeded by Arthur W. Hummel Jr. |
