= Gaston J. Sigur Jr. =

American government official (1924–1995)

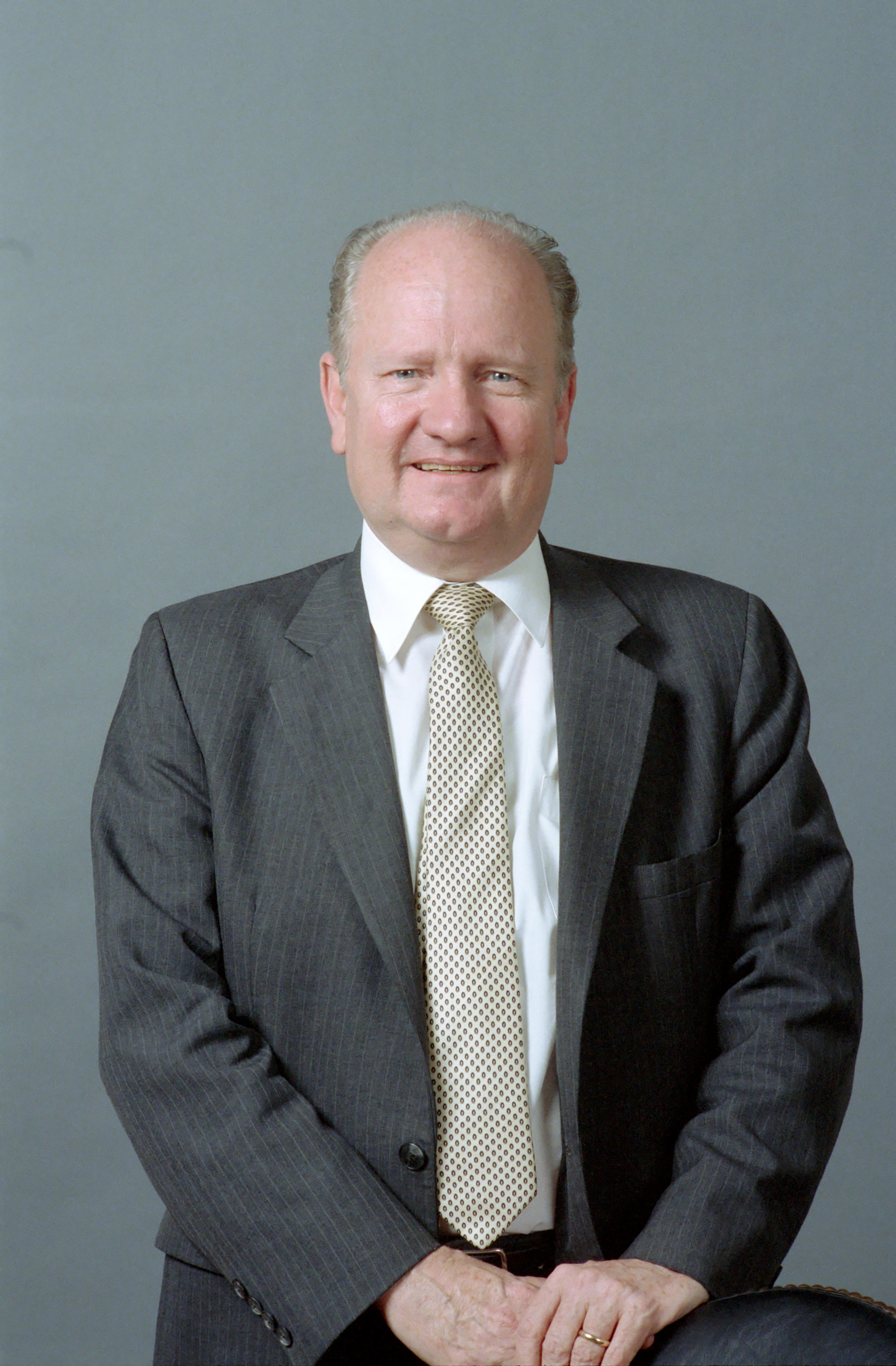

17th Assistant Secretary of State for East Asian and Pacific Affairs
- In office March 12, 1986 – February 21, 1989
- President: Ronald Reagan
- Preceded by: Paul Wolfowitz
- Succeeded by: Richard H. Solomon

Personal details
- Born: Gaston Joseph Sigur Jr. November 13, 1924 Franklin, Louisiana
- Died: April 26, 1995 (aged 70) Bethesda, Maryland
- Party: Republican
- Spouse: Estelle Sigur
- Children: Christopher Sigur; Gaston J. Sigur, III; Paul Sigur; Katherine Dayton; Thomas Sigur

Military service
- Branch/service: United States Army; United States Army Air Forces
- Years of service: 1943–46

Gaston Joseph Sigur Jr. (pronounced Seeg-YOOR; November 13, 1924 – April 26, 1995) was the United States Assistant Secretary of State for East Asian and Pacific Affairs from 1986 to 1989.

== Early years ==
Sigur was born in Franklin, Louisiana on November 13, 1924. His post-secondary education began at Louisiana State University at the age of 16 in 1941. In 1943, he joined the United States Army and was pulled from regular duty after basic training to study Japanese at the University of Chicago, the University of Michigan, and at Fort Snelling where he was commissioned. At that time the war was over and Sigur was sent to Japan where he served as an Army Air Force intelligence officer for Tachikawa Air Base during the Occupation of Japan until 1946 when he was discharged.

Back in the United States, Sigur returned to the University of Michigan where he earned the B.A., M.A., and Ph.D. in History, concentrating in Far Eastern history. He met Estelle Smotrys, a nursing student, while pursuing his doctorate and the two were married prior to him completing his studies.

After graduating he worked with The Asia Foundation from 1956 to 1959 and as a research scholar at Sophia University in Tokyo from 1959 to 1961. In 1962, Sigur moved his family to Afghanistan where he served as The Asia Foundation representative to Afghanistan until 1966; after which he continued his work for The Asia Foundation in Japan and San Francisco. In 1972, he became professor of international affairs and director of the Institute of Sino-Soviet Studies at George Washington University in Washington, D.C.

== Reagan administration ==
Sigur was appointed to the United States National Security Council in 1982 as senior director of Asian affairs, and in 1983 he became Special Assistant to the President for Asian affairs. In 1986, at the urging of United States Secretary of State George P. Shultz, President Ronald Reagan nominated Sigur as Assistant Secretary of State for East Asian and Pacific Affairs. After Senate confirmation, Sigur held this office from March 12, 1986 until February 21, 1989.

A key foreign policy goal of the Reagan Administration was the promotion of democracy abroad. In accordance with this goal, Sigur pushed for more openness and a transition to democracy in Asia-Pacific nations throughout his tenure as Assistant Secretary of State. In applying this mandate he brought a cautious approach to diplomacy, which was based on his extensive knowledge of the cultural sensitivities and history of the East. This approach, colleagues have noted, allowed him to argue his points with foreign diplomats without offending them; which made him an influential and effective negotiator. However, others have criticized him for not taking a more bold and innovative stance towards foreign governments.

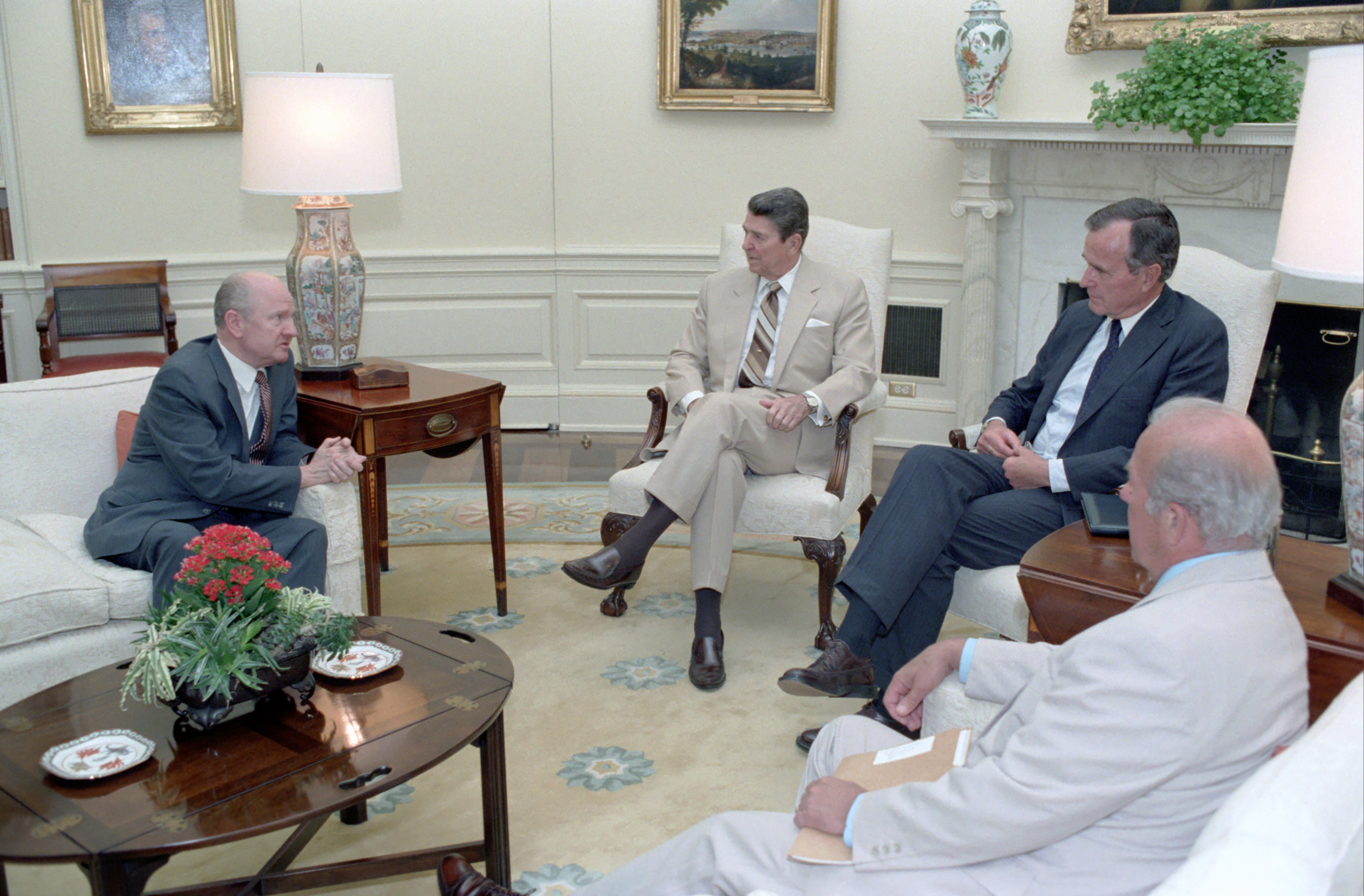
Sigur (left) in the Oval Office briefing President Ronald Reagan, Vice President George H. W. Bush, and Secretary of State George Shultz on the South Korean crisis in June 1987.

=== South Korea ===
In 1987, the authoritarian government of South Korea was facing a constitutional crisis which Sigur helped nudge towards democracy. He delivered a speech in February 1987 expressing American support for a transition to democracy under a "new political framework," urging South Korea to "civilianize" its military-controlled government. This speech was made without the approval of Secretary of State Shultz, who at first distanced himself from the strong language and progressive policy laid out by Sigur, but soon after adopted it as Washington's official policy towards Seoul.

As President Reagan’s envoy to Seoul in the midst of the June Democracy Movement, Sigur applied key diplomatic pressure on the South Korean government to keep it from instituting martial law or a military coup, eventually leading to open elections and a transition to democracy.

=== Other efforts with the Reagan administration ===
During his time in office, Sigur sought trade concessions from Japan which included improved access to and openness in the Japanese market, a correction of the yen-dollar exchange rate, and other economic issues. He was heavily involved in U.S. diplomatic work with the government of the Philippines in their transition to democracy and subsequent struggles with communist rebel groups. He was also involved in talks with the Soviet Union concerning the withdrawal of Vietnamese troops from Cambodia and he worked to continue the liberalizing trend in Taiwan.

While promoting political openness and democracy in Asian nations throughout his career with the Reagan Administration, Sigur also sought to promote and encourage economic growth and open markets in the region. While conceding that the manufactured goods produced by cheap labor and the raw material exports of the region would pose serious competition to American companies, he argued that if economic growth is accompanied by openness in East Asian markets, it would contribute to regional political stability and ultimately to U.S. security.

=== Iran–Contra affair ===
Sigur was questioned extensively by joint Congressional committees (Congressional Committees Investigating The Iran-Contra Affair) for his knowledge relating to the Iran-Contra affair. Members of Congress examined his interactions with Colonel Oliver North and other individuals who were named as being interested in providing financial assistance to the Nicaraguan contras. Although Sigur did engage his contacts (e.g. Taiwan) as requested by other Reagan Administration officials, he was not aware of any illicit activities between the United States government and the contras, nor did he comply with the illegal transfer of money to the contras.

== Later life ==
At the close of the Reagan presidency, Sigur returned to George Washington University in 1989 as Distinguished Professor of East Asian studies. He advised President George H. W. Bush on Asian affairs, accompanying the president on his trip to China. As a political conservative and highly respected authority on East Asia and the Pacific, he continued to serve the Republican White House as a part-time adviser throughout Bush’s presidency.

In 1991, in recognition for his profound impact and mark on American international policy towards East Asia, the Gaston Sigur Center for Asian Studies at George Washington University was named in his honor. Sigur served as senior consultant of the Center until his death.

On April 26, 1995 Sigur died of cardiac arrest at his home in Bethesda, Maryland.

Government offices
Preceded by Paul Wolfowitz	Assistant Secretary of State for East Asian and Pacific Affairs; March 12, 1986 – February 21, 1989	Succeeded by Richard H. Solomon
