= Richard Sneider =

American diplomat

Richard Lee Sneider (June 29, 1922 – August 16, 1986) was an American diplomat who served as United States Ambassador to South Korea and Deputy Assistant Secretary of State for East Asian Affairs.

Sneider served in the United States Army during World War II. He got his undergraduate degree from Brown University and a graduate degree from Columbia University. He held various assignments in Japan and at State Department headquarters in Washington, D.C.

As U.S. Ambassador to South Korea, Sneider was unsympathetic to the opposition movement against the Park Chung-hee regime. He viewed opposition leader Kim Dae-jung as a "political hack."

Diplomatic posts
Preceded by Philip Habib	United States Ambassador to South Korea; 1974–1978	Succeeded by William H. Gleysteen, Jr.
