= Hugh S. Cumming Jr. =

American lawyer (1900–1986)

1st Director of the Bureau for Intelligence and Research
- In office October 10, 1957 – February 19, 1961
- Preceded by: New office
- Succeeded by: Roger Hilsman

United States Ambassador to Indonesia
- In office October 15, 1953 – March 3, 1957
- Preceded by: H. Merle Cochran
- Succeeded by: John M. Allison

Personal details
- Born: Hugh Smith Cumming Jr. March 10, 1900 Richmond, Virginia, U.S.
- Died: November 24, 1986 (aged 86)
- Resting place: Saint Johns Church Cemetery, Hampton, Virginia, U.S.
- Spouse: Winifred Burney West
- Parent(s): Hugh S. Cumming; Lucy Booth Cumming
- Education: University of Virginia School of Law
- Profession: Lawyer

Military service
- Allegiance: United States
- Branch/service: United States Army
- Battles/wars: World War I

Hugh Smith Cumming Jr. (March 10, 1900 – November 24, 1986) was a career Foreign Service Officer from 1933 until 1963 when he retired. During these 30 years, he was a United States diplomat who was United States Ambassador to Indonesia from 1953 to 1957 and then Director of the Bureau of Intelligence and Research from 1957 to 1961.

== Biography ==
Cumming was born in Richmond, Virginia on March 10, 1900, the son of Hugh Smith Cumming Sr. (1869–1948) and his wife, Lucy Booth Cumming (1871–1960).

During World War I, Cumming served in the United States Army. After the war, he received a law degree from the University of Virginia School of Law in 1924.

Cumming Jr married Winifred Burney West (1907-1978) As a member of the United States Department of State, Cumming served as counsel to the United States Embassy in Sweden and then in the U.S. Embassy in Russia.

In 1953, President of the United States Dwight D. Eisenhower named Cumming United States Ambassador to Indonesia. Cumming presented his credentials on October 15, 1953, and held the post until March 3, 1957.

In 1957, President Eisenhower nominated Cumming to be the 1st ever Director of the Bureau of Intelligence and Research within the U.S. Department of State. He held this office from October 10, 1957, until February 19, 1961. He retired as a Foreign Service Officer in 1963.

Hugh Smith Cumming Jr died on November 24, 1986, and was buried in the Saint Johns Church Cemetery in Hampton, Hampton City, Virginia.

== Notes ==
- Profile from Political Graveyard
- Cumming family papers at the University of Virginia
- Webpage of the Hugh S. and Winifred B. Cumming Memorial Professorship in International Affairs

Diplomatic posts
Preceded by H. Merle Cochran	United States Ambassador to Indonesia; October 15, 1953 – March 3, 1957	Succeeded by John Moore Allison
Government offices
Preceded by New office	Director of the Bureau of Intelligence and Research; October 10, 1957 – February 19, 1961	Succeeded by Roger Hilsman
