= Norman Topping =

President of the University of Southern California

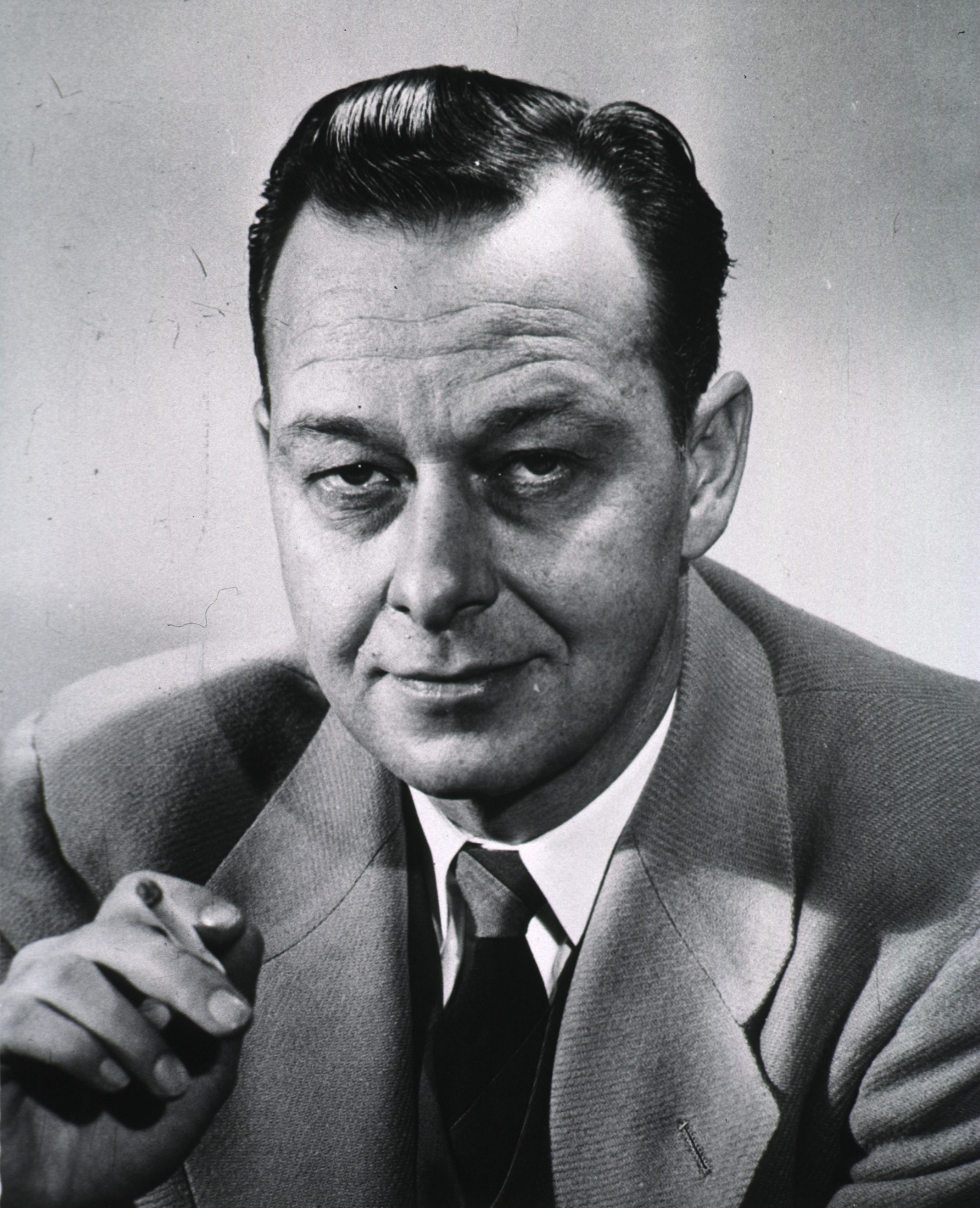
Norman Topping

Norman Topping (1908 – November 18, 1997) was the President of the University of Southern California between 1958 and 1970. He succeeded Fred D. Fagg, Jr., and was succeeded by John R. Hubbard. He was chancellor between 1971 and 1980. He became emeritus chancellor in 1980.

While President of USC, Topping announced an ambitious "Master Plan for Enterprise and Excellence in Education." As part of the execution of the plan, USC's University Park Campus grew from 95 to 150 acres. Several dozen temporary buildings were replaced with permanent structures. In sum, it was the largest expansion of USC's physical campus, and helped pave the way for future expansion of USC's research mission. Also during Topping's presidency, USC joined the Association of American Universities an important symbolic step toward USC's increasing recognition as a top tier research university.

Dr. Topping was an BA and MD alumnus of USC and worked at the U.S. Public Health Service on the typhus vaccine used in World War II by more than fifteen million United States, Canadian, and British soldiers, a treatment still in use today. He served in the Coast Guard. Later he helped develop the first effective treatment against Rocky Mountain spotted fever. He was an associate director of the NIH and Assistant Surgeon General from 1948 to 1952. Topping was vice president for medical affairs at the University of Pennsylvania from 1952 to 1958.

USC's Norman Topping Student Center was named in his honor.

Academic offices
| Preceded by Fred D. Fagg, Jr. | President of the University of Southern California; 1958-1970 | Succeeded by John R. Hubbard |
