= Assistant Secretary of State for East Asian and Pacific Affairs =

U.S. government position

United States Assistant Secretary of State for East Asian and Pacific Affairs
- Seal of the United States Department of State

- Flag of an Assistant Secretary of State

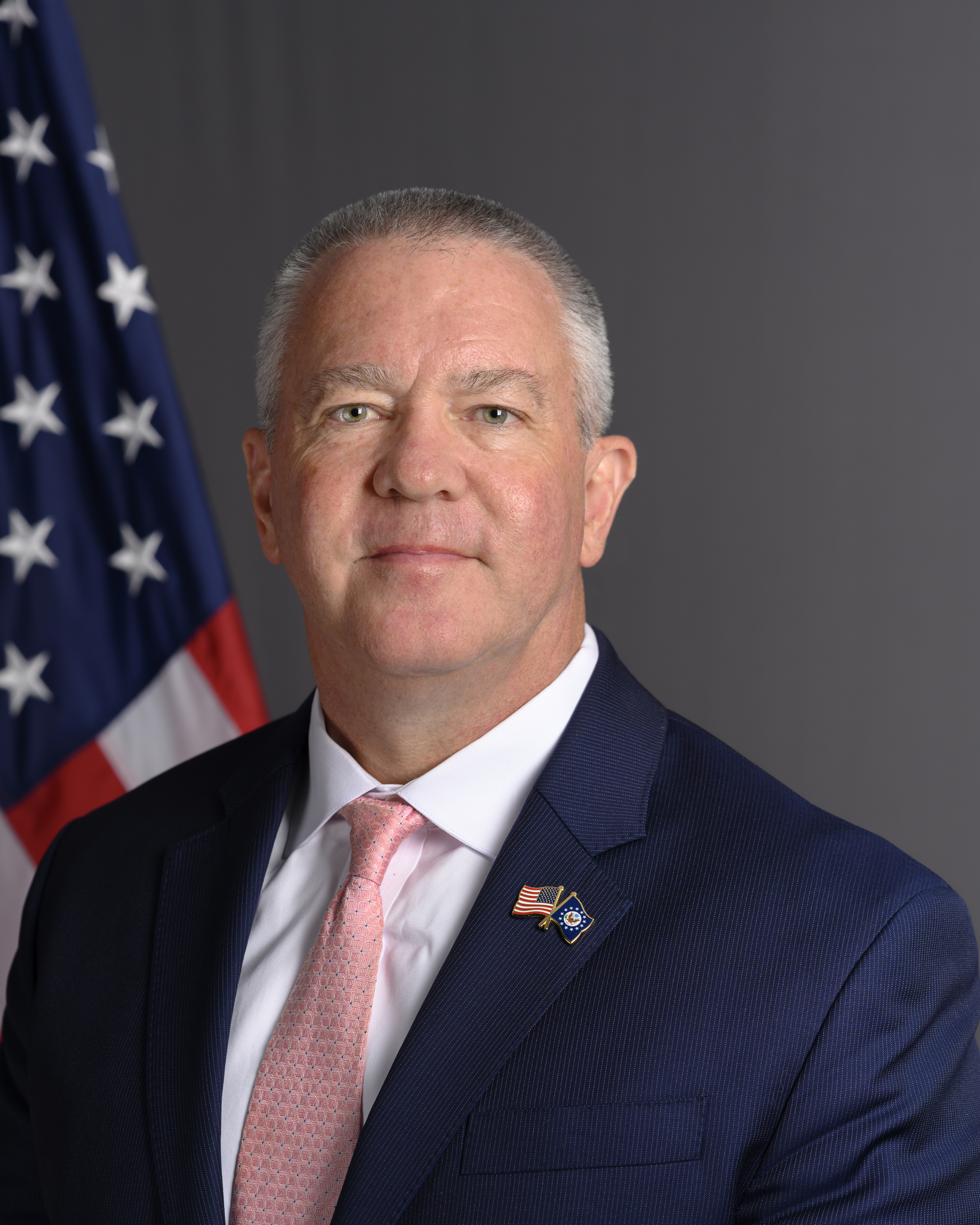
- Incumbent; Michael G. DeSombre since October 10, 2025
- Reports to: Under Secretary of State for Political Affairs
- Nominator: President of the United States
- Inaugural holder: William Walton Butterworth
- Formation: 1949
- Website: Official website

The assistant secretary of state for East Asian and Pacific affairs is the head of the Bureau of East Asian and Pacific Affairs within the United States Department of State. The assistant secretary guides operation of the U.S. diplomatic establishment in the countries of the Asia-Pacific region and advises the secretary of state and the under secretary for political affairs on matters relating to the area.

The Department of State established the position of assistant secretary of state for Far Eastern affairs in 1949, after the Commission on Organization of the Executive Branch of Government recommended that certain offices be upgraded to bureau level and after Congress increased the number of assistant secretaries of state from six to ten. On November 1, 1966, the department by administrative action changed the incumbent's designation to assistant secretary for East Asian and Pacific affairs. The Division of Far Eastern Affairs, established in 1908, was the first geographical division to be established in the Department of State.

== List of assistant secretaries of state for Far Eastern affairs, 1949–1966 ==
| # | Image | Name | Assumed office | Left office | President served under |
|---|---|---|---|---|---|
| 1 | | William Walton Butterworth | September 29, 1949 | July 4, 1950 | Harry S. Truman |
| 2 | | Dean Rusk | March 28, 1950 | December 9, 1951 | Harry S. Truman |
| 3 | | John Moore Allison | February 1, 1952 | April 7, 1953 | Harry S. Truman |
| 4 | | Walter S. Robertson | April 8, 1953 | June 30, 1959 | Dwight D. Eisenhower |
| 5 | | J. Graham Parsons | July 1, 1959 | March 30, 1961 | Dwight D. Eisenhower |
| 6 | | Walter P. McConaughy | April 24, 1961 | December 3, 1961 | John F. Kennedy |
| 7 | | W. Averell Harriman | December 4, 1961 | April 3, 1963 | John F. Kennedy |
| 8 | | Roger Hilsman | May 9, 1963 | March 15, 1964 | John F. Kennedy and Lyndon B. Johnson |

== List of assistant secretaries of state for East Asian and Pacific affairs, 1966–present ==
| # | Image | Name | Assumed office | Left office | President served under |
|---|---|---|---|---|---|
| 9 | | William Bundy | March 16, 1964 | May 4, 1969 | Lyndon B. Johnson |
| 10 | | Marshall Green | May 5, 1969 | May 10, 1973 | Richard Nixon |
| - | | G. McMurtrie Godley | | | Richard Nixon |
| 11 | | Robert S. Ingersoll | January 8, 1974 | July 9, 1974 | Richard Nixon |
| 12 | | Philip Habib | September 27, 1974 | June 30, 1976 | Gerald Ford |
| 13 | | Arthur W. Hummel, Jr. | July 12, 1976 | March 14, 1977 | Gerald Ford |
| 14 | | Richard Holbrooke | March 31, 1977 | January 13, 1981 | Jimmy Carter |
| 15 | | John H. Holdridge | May 28, 1981 | December 9, 1982 | Ronald Reagan |
| 16 | | Paul Wolfowitz | December 22, 1982 | March 12, 1986 | Ronald Reagan |
| 17 | | Gaston J. Sigur, Jr. | March 12, 1986 | February 21, 1989 | Ronald Reagan |
| - | | Richard Armitage | | | George H. W. Bush |
| 18 | | Richard H. Solomon | June 23, 1989 | July 10, 1992 | George H. W. Bush |
| 19 | | William Clark, Jr. | July 10, 1992 | April 23, 1993 | George H. W. Bush |
| 20 | | Winston Lord | April 23, 1993 | February 18, 1997 | Bill Clinton |
| 21 | | Stanley O. Roth | August 5, 1997 | January 20, 2001 | Bill Clinton |
| 22 | | James A. Kelly | May 1, 2001 | January 31, 2005 | George W. Bush |
| - | | Evans J.R. Revere (acting) | February 1, 2005 | April 8, 2005 | George W. Bush |
| 23 | | Christopher R. Hill | April 8, 2005 | April 21, 2009 | George W. Bush and Barack Obama |
| 24 | | Kurt M. Campbell | June 2, 2009 | February 8, 2013 | Barack Obama |
| 25 | | Daniel R. Russel | July 12, 2013 | March 8, 2017 | Barack Obama and Donald Trump |
| - | | Susan Thornton (acting) | March 9, 2017 | July 7, 2018 | Donald Trump |
| - | | W. Patrick Murphy (acting) | July 2018 | June 2019 | Donald Trump |
| 26 | | David R. Stilwell | June 20, 2019 | January 20, 2021 | Donald Trump |
| - | | Sung Kim (acting) | January 20, 2021 | June 4, 2021 | Joe Biden |
| - | | Kin W. Moy (acting) | June 15, 2021 | September 24, 2021 | Joe Biden |
| 27 | | Daniel Kritenbrink | September 24, 2021 | January 17, 2025 | Joe Biden |
| - | | Sean O'Neill (acting) | January 20, 2025 | July 18, 2025 | Donald Trump |
| - | | Y. Kevin Kim (acting) | July 18, 2025 | October 10, 2025 | Donald Trump |
| 28 | | Michael G. DeSombre | October 10, 2025 | Present | Donald Trump |
