= John M. Allison =

American diplomat (1905–1978)

John Moore Allison
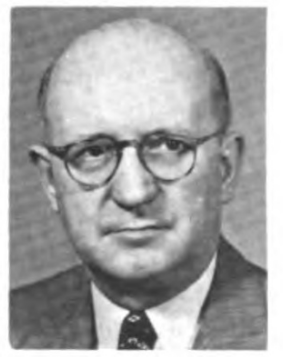
- Allison circa 1952

United States Ambassador to Czechoslovakia
- In office April 24, 1958 – May 4, 1960
- Preceded by: U. Alexis Johnson
- Succeeded by: Christian M. Ravndal

United States Ambassador to Indonesia
- In office March 13, 1957 – January 29, 1958
- Preceded by: Hugh S. Cumming Jr.
- Succeeded by: Howard P. Jones

United States Ambassador to Japan
- In office May 28, 1953 – February 2, 1957
- Preceded by: Robert Daniel Murphy
- Succeeded by: Douglas MacArthur II

3rd Assistant Secretary of State for Far Eastern Affairs
- In office February 1, 1952 – April 7, 1953
- President: Harry Truman; Dwight Eisenhower
- Preceded by: Dean Rusk
- Succeeded by: Walter S. Robertson

Personal details
- Born: April 7, 1905 Holton, Kansas, U.S.
- Died: October 28, 1978 (aged 73) Honolulu, Hawaii, U.S.
- Education: University of Nebraska (BS)

John Moore Allison (April 7, 1905 – October 28, 1978) was an American diplomat who served as the United States Ambassador to Japan from 1953 to 1957. From 1957 to 1958, he was Ambassador to Indonesia and from 1958 to 1960 to Czechoslovakia. In the 1960s and 1970s, he was a professor at the University of Hawaii.

== Early life ==
Allison was born in Holton, Kansas and raised in Lincoln, Nebraska. He graduated from Lincoln High School and earned a bachelor's degree in political science from the University of Nebraska in 1927.

Declining a scholarship to pursue graduate work at Nebraska, and refusing to go to work for his father, Allison accepted a post as an English teacher Japan in 1927. He worked for two years as an English teacher, first in a middle school in Odawara, and later at the Imperial Japanese Naval Engineer Officers Academy at Atsugi. In 1929 Allison moved to Shanghai, where he worked as a branch advertising manager for General Motors.

== Career in the Foreign Service ==
In 1931, Allison took and passed the U.S. Foreign Service exam, and was inducted into the Foreign Service in 1932. He quickly rose through the ranks, serving as consul in Dalian (1935–36), Jinan (1936–37), Nanjing (1937–38), Shanghai (1938), and Osaka (1939–41). Allison was in Osaka during the Japanese attack at Pearl Harbor.

On January 26, 1938, during the period of the Nanking Massacre, Allison, at the time consul at the American embassy in Nanjing, was struck in the face by a Japanese soldier. This incident is commonly known as the "Allison Incident." Japanese Consul-General Katsuo Okazaki apologized formally on January 30 (after the Americans demanded they do so). This incident, together with the looting of American property in Nanking that took place at the same time, further strained relations between Japan and the United States, which had already been damaged by the USS Panay incident less than two months earlier.

Allison served as a consul in London during World War II. After Japan's surrender, he served in various State Department leadership positions covering Japan and the Far East from 1946 to 1952. Allison participated in the drafting of the Treaty of San Francisco that formally ended the war, serving as John Foster Dulles's aide during the latter's negotiation of the treaty.

Allison was named United States Ambassador to Japan in 1953. As Ambassador, Allison took a hard line in pressuring Japan to remilitarize. In Allison's view, Japan had no choice but to bow to U.S. demands, arguing "they need us at least as much if not more than we need them." In March 1954, 16 years after the "Allison Incident," Allison and the man who had apologized to him in Nanjing, Japanese Foreign Minister Okazaki, signed the U.S. and Japan Mutual Defense Assistance Agreement on behalf of their respective countries. The agreement secured U.S. military and economic aid to Japan in exchange for a vague promise from the Japanese government to remilitarize.

In 1956, Allison accepted a new post as Ambassador to Indonesia. In 1957, he recommended that the U.S. government support Indonesian claims regarding Western New Guinea.

In 1958, Allison was transferred to Czechoslovakia, a posting he found unexciting. After his mentor John Foster Dulles died in 1959, Allison decided to retire from the Foreign Service, rather than work under a new boss. In addition, his wife was battling illness and needed better access to medical care.

== Later life ==
In 1960, Allison retired and secured a teaching job at the University of Hawaii. He also wrote a weekly foreign affairs column for the Honolulu Star–Bulletin. Allison served as president of Pacific and Asian Affairs Council, a nonprofit promoting international relations and Hawaii's role on the Asian–Pacific stage. In 1973, Allison published his memoir, Ambassador from the Prairie; or, Allison in Wonderland. Allison died on October 28, 1978, in Honolulu, Hawaii.

Government offices
Preceded by Dean Rusk	Assistant Secretary of State for Far Eastern Affairs; February 1, 1952 – April 7, 1953	Succeeded by Walter S. Robertson
Diplomatic posts
Preceded by Robert Daniel Murphy	United States Ambassador to Japan; May 28, 1953 – February 2, 1957	Succeeded by Douglas MacArthur II
Preceded by Hugh S. Cumming, Jr.	United States Ambassador to Indonesia; March 13, 1957 – January 29, 1958	Succeeded by Howard P. Jones
Preceded by U. Alexis Johnson	United States Ambassador to Czechoslovakia; April 24, 1958 – May 4, 1960	Succeeded by Christian M. Ravndal
