= H. Merle Cochran =

American diplomat, economist and career Foreign Service Officer

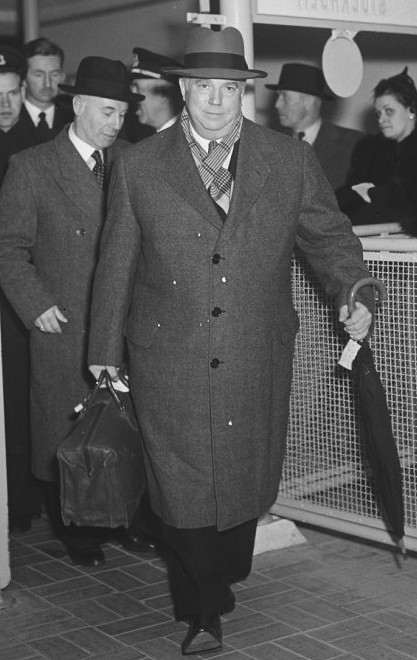
- Cochran in 1949

United States Ambassador to Indonesia
- In office December 30, 1949 – February 27, 1953
- President: Harry S. Truman
- Preceded by: Position created
- Succeeded by: Hugh S. Cumming Jr.

Personal details
- Born: Horace Merle Cochran; 1892 Crawfordsville, Indiana, U.S.
- Died: September 20, 1973 (aged 81) Houston, Texas, U.S.
- Education: University of Arizona (BS, MS)

Horace Merle Cochran (1892 – 1973) was an American diplomat, economist, and career Foreign Service Officer. He served as the first U.S. Ambassador to Indonesia from 1949 to 1953.

== Early life and education ==
Cochran was born in 1892 in Crawfordsville, Indiana. He earned a Bachelor of Science and Master of Science from the University of Arizona.

== Career ==
After joining the United States Foreign Service, Cochran served as Vice Consul in Germany, Mexico, Guatemala, Switzerland, Jamaica, Haiti, and Montreal, Canada. He then served as Deputy Liaison Officer at the United States Department of State in Washington, D.C. He served as Consul in Paris and Switzerland before returning to France to serve as Financial Secretary of the Embassy. Cochran briefly left the State Department to serve as the Technical Assistant to the United States Secretary of the Treasury from 1939 to 1941 under Henry Morgenthau Jr. From 1941 to 1948, Cochran served as a Senior Foreign Service Inspector. He was nominated to serve as U.S. Ambassador to Pakistan in 1949, but was never confirmed. He served as the first U.S. Ambassador to Indonesia from 1949 to 1953. He was commissioned during a recess of the United States Senate and recommissioned on February 2, 1950, after confirmation.

In January 1952, Cochran engaged in private negotiations with Indonesian Foreign Minister Achmad Soebardjo to provide aid and loans to Indonesia under the Mutual Security Act of 1951. When the negotiations were made public, opposition in Indonesia's parliament emerged, eventually culminating with the resignation of Soebardjo and then-Prime Minister of Indonesia Soekiman Wirjosandjojo in late February.

Cochran retired from the Foreign Service in 1953, and worked as Deputy Managing Director of the International Monetary Fund from 1953 to 1962. From 1963 to 1969, he served as the Chairman of the Greek consortium of the OECD.

== Death ==
Chochran died on September 20, 1973, in Houston, Texas at the age of 81.
