= U.S. and Japan Mutual Defense Assistance Agreement =

1954 treaty between the United States and Japan

The U.S. and Japan Mutual Defense Assistance Agreement was signed on March 8, 1954, in Tokyo between John Allison of the United States and Katsuo Okazaki of Japan. The accord contained eleven articles and seven amendments (or annexes). The agreement dictated that both the United States and Japan support each other militarily. Specifically, it permitted the United States to station its troops on Japanese soil in order to maintain security in the region. Moreover, Japan was obligated to take responsibility in protecting itself and was permitted to rearm for defensive purposes only. Ultimately, the agreement was ratified on May 1, 1954.

== See also ==
- Security Treaty between the United States and Japan
- List of treaties
