= James A. Kelly =

American naval officer and diplomat

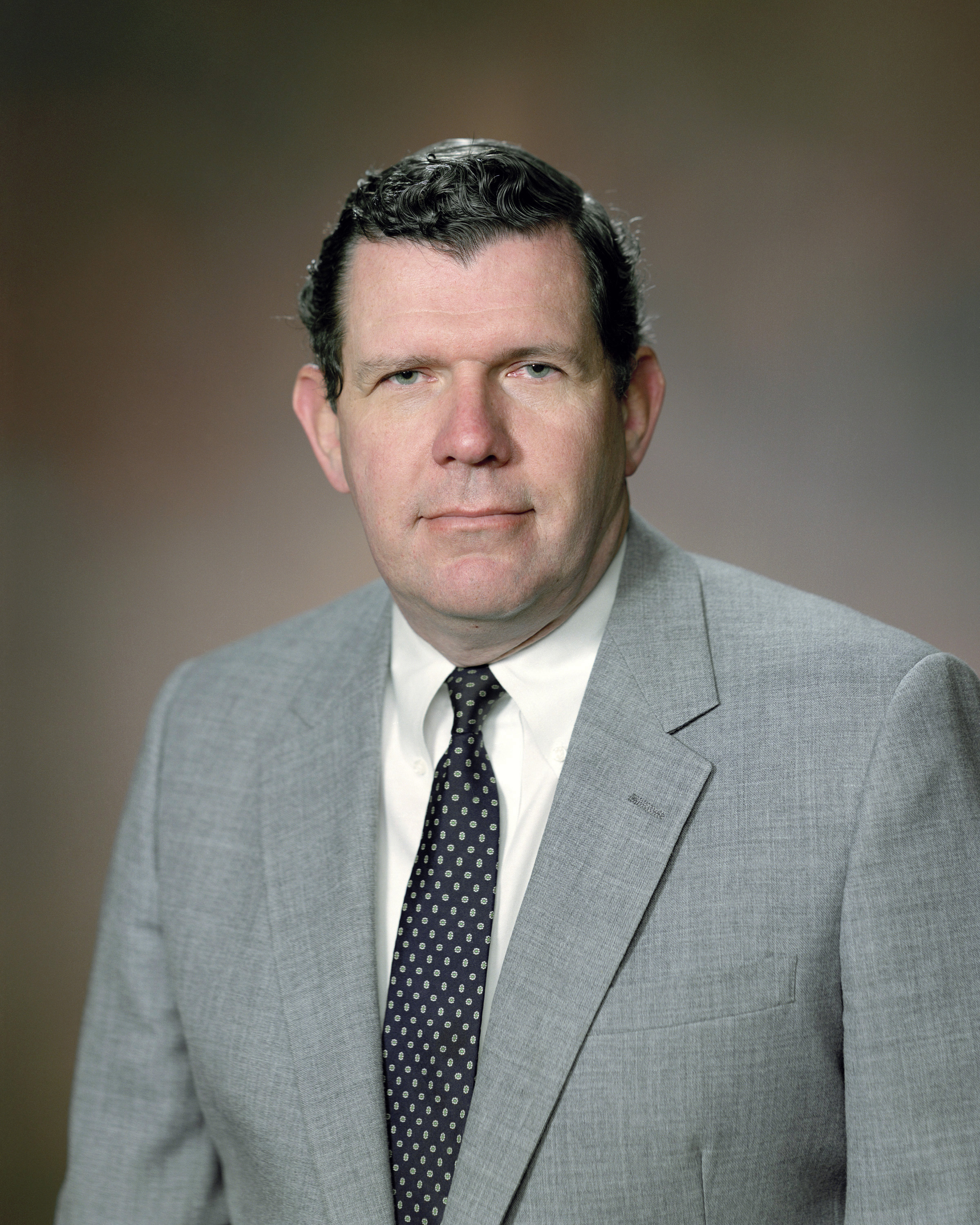
- Official portrait, 1983

22nd Assistant Secretary of State for East Asian and Pacific Affairs
- In office May 1, 2001 – January 31, 2005
- President: George W. Bush
- Preceded by: Stanley O. Roth
- Succeeded by: Christopher R. Hill

Personal details
- Born: James Andrew Kelly; September 15, 1936 (age 90)
- Education: United States Naval Academy (BS); Harvard University (MBA)

Military service
- Branch/service: United States Navy
- Years of service: 1959–1982
- Rank: Captain
- Unit: Navy Supply Corps

James Andrew Kelly (born September 15, 1936) is an American foreign policy advisor who served as Assistant Secretary of State for East Asian and Pacific Affairs from 2001 to 2005.

== Education ==
Born September 15, 1936, and raised in Atlanta, Georgia, Kelly attended Georgia Tech for one year before receiving an appointment to the United States Naval Academy. In 1959, he earned a Bachelor of Science from the Naval Academy. Kelly later earned an MBA from the Harvard Business School in 1968. He graduated from the National War College in 1977.

== Career ==
Kelly served in the United States Navy from 1959 to 1982, concluding his active duty as a Captain in the Navy Supply Corps. From June 1983 to March 1986, Kelly worked at the Pentagon as deputy assistant secretary of defense for international security affairs (East Asia and Pacific). Kelly served special assistant for national security affairs to President Ronald Reagan, and as senior director for Asian affairs on the United States National Security Council from March 1986 to March 1989. From 1989 to 1994, Kelly was president of EAP Associates, Inc., of Honolulu, which provided international business consulting services with an Asia and Pacific focus to private clients.

From 1994 to 2001, Kelly was president of Pacific Forum International, which has analyzed and led dialogue on Asia–Pacific political, security, and economic/business issues since 1975. He has served as a senior adviser and distinguished alumni at CSIS. In 2002, Kelly worked as an envoy to North Korea.

From 2001 to 2005, Kelly served as Assistant Secretary of State for East Asian and Pacific Affairs. President George W. Bush nominated Kelly on April 3, 2001. He was confirmed by the U.S. Senate on April 26, 2001 and sworn in on May 1, 2001.

In 2020, Kelly, along with over 130 other former Republican national security officials, signed a statement that asserted that President Trump was unfit to serve another term, and "To that end, we are firmly convinced that it is in the best interest of our nation that Vice President Joe Biden be elected as the next President of the United States, and we will vote for him."

Kelly was recently Chairman of the Board of the Directors of Pacific Forum International. At the Pacific Forum, the James A. Kelly Korea Fellowship Program is named for Kelly.

Government offices
Preceded by Stanley O. Roth	Assistant Secretary of State for East Asian and Pacific Affairs; May 1, 2001 – January 31, 2005	Succeeded by Christopher R. Hill
