= Stanley O. Roth =

American foreign policy advisor

- Roth c. 1997

21st Assistant Secretary of State for East Asian and Pacific Affairs
- In office August 5, 1997 – January 20, 2001
- President: Bill Clinton
- Preceded by: Winston Lord
- Succeeded by: James A. Kelly

Personal details
- Education: Brandeis University (BA); Johns Hopkins University (MA)

Stanley Owen Roth (born 1954) is an American foreign policy advisor who served as Assistant Secretary of State for East Asian and Pacific Affairs from 1997 to 2001.

== Education ==
Roth earned a Bachelor of Arts degree in political science from Brandeis University in 1975. He then attended the School of Advanced International Studies at Johns Hopkins University, receiving a Master of Arts in International Affairs in 1977.

== Career ==
In 1979, Roth joined the staff of Congressman Stephen Solarz as chief foreign policy aide. He held this job until January 1983, when he became a staff consultant of the United States House Committee on Foreign Affairs Subcommittee on Asian and Pacific Affairs, the subcommittee responsible for the U.S.'s policy towards the Asia-Pacific, including foreign aid, military sales, trade issues and human rights. In October 1985, he was promoted to Staff Director of the Subcommittee. During his time as the Subcommittee's Staff Director, the Subcommittee held hearing on Ferdinand Marcos's hidden wealth in the United States. He was again promoted in January 1993 to become the House Foreign Affair's Committee's Director of Committee Liaison.

In July 1993, Roth became Deputy Assistant Secretary of State for East Asian and Pacific Affairs, in which capacity he was responsible for Asian security affairs at the Pentagon. Roth became a Special Assistant to the President and Senior Director for Asian Affairs at the United States National Security Council in March 1994.

Roth joined the United States Institute of Peace in January 1996 as Director of Research & Studies.

In May 1997, President of the United States Bill Clinton nominated Roth as Assistant Secretary of State for East Asian and Pacific Affairs, and Roth held this office from August 5, 1997 until January 20, 2001.

Roth left government service in 2001, joining Boeing as vice president of International Relations — Asia. He became Boeing's vice president of International Government Relations in July 2006.

Government offices
Preceded by Winston Lord	Assistant Secretary of State for East Asian and Pacific Affairs; August 5, 1997 – January 20, 2001	Succeeded by James A. Kelly
