= Richard L. Walker =

American diplomat

Richard "Dixie" Walker
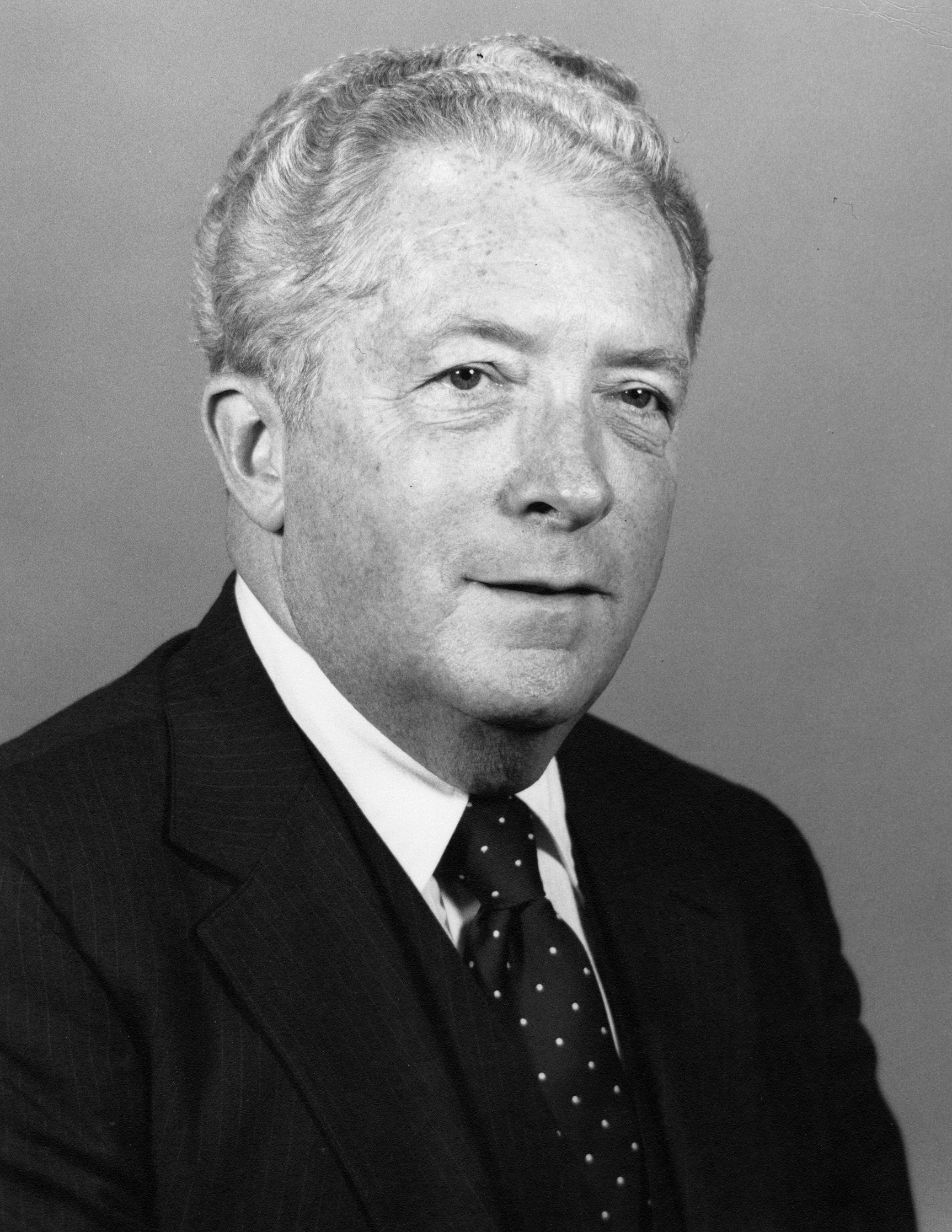

United States Ambassador to South Korea
- In office August 12, 1981 – October 25, 1986
- President: Ronald Reagan
- Preceded by: William H. Gleysteen, Jr.
- Succeeded by: James R. Lilley

Personal details
- Born: April 13, 1922 Bellefonte, Pennsylvania, U.S.
- Died: July 22, 2003 (aged 81) Columbia, South Carolina, U.S.
- Resting place: Berlin, Maryland
- Spouse: Celeno Kenly
- Children: 3
- Education: Drew University (BA); Yale University (MA, PhD)

Military service
- Allegiance: United States
- Branch/service: United States Army
- Years of service: 1943-1946
- Battles/wars: World War II

Richard Louis "Dixie" Walker (April 13, 1922 – July 22, 2003) was an American scholar, author, and former ambassador to South Korea.

== Early life ==
Walker was born in Bellefonte, Pennsylvania. He received his B.A. degree in 1944 from Drew University and his M.A. in 1947 and Ph. D. in 1950 from Yale University. He served in the United States Army in World War II from 1943 to 1946, and drawing on a family missionary background and intensive language training while serving in the Army, he became a Mandarin Chinese language interpreter at General Douglas MacArthur's headquarters in the Pacific Theater of Operations. He later served in the Korean War as well. He was married to Celeno Kenly Walker for 45 years and had three children.

== Career ==
After his military service, Walker was on the faculty of Yale University until 1957, when he moved to Columbia, South Carolina, to organize a new program in international studies at the University of South Carolina (USC) that he headed until 1972. In 1961, he founded the Institute of International Studies and headed it until 1981, as it grew into a preeminent national and international center of research, conferences, consultation and publications. In 1996, the institute was renamed the Richard L. Walker Institute in his honor.

In 1981, Walker was chosen by President Ronald Reagan to serve as his ambassador to the Republic of Korea. After unanimous confirmation by the U. S. Senate, he served with distinction at that post until 1986, longer than any other American ambassador. He was partly responsible for securing the release of the imprisoned dissident Kim Dae-jung, who was under sentence of death and who would later become president of South Korea. For this and other efforts, he received recognition from President Reagan and was awarded the highest civilian decoration of the U.S. Department of Defense. Reagan wrote to him, "You have transformed quiet diplomacy into a fine art."

Following his tenure as ambassador, he returned to the University of South Carolina and retired as the James F. Byrnes Professor Emeritus of International Studies and Ambassador-in-Residence at the university. He was academically active until his death.

Walker's life focused on study, writing, and involvement in East Asia. On several occasions, he lived there with his family in Japan, South Korea, and Taiwan. He traveled frequently over many years to countries in East and Southeast Asia for service with the U.S. Department of State and the U.S. Information Agency. Walker was the author of seventeen books, a contributor to more than 70 others, and author of numerous articles and reviews. In his research and writing, he focused especially on cultural factors in international relations. In his 1956 book, China Under Communism: The First Five Years, Walker was early to recognize the suffering and atrocities occurring under the communist People's Republic of China regime, and argued that, in the long term, communism was incompatible within Chinese culture.

A major part of his academic significance is that he tried to some extent to stand between the two competing sides during the period of McCarthyism, which fostered intense anti-communist suspicions in the United States from the late 1940s to the late 1950s. However, as he describes in a 1998 memoir, he still faced academic ostracism for his perceived anti-Communist China bias.

In addition to his service at South Carolina, where he held its first endowed professorship, Walker had a number of visiting academic appointments from other universities, including the University of Washington, National Taiwan University, and Kyoto and Kyoto Sangyo University in Japan. He also served on the faculty of the National War College in Washington, D.C., of which he was a graduate, and he lectured at academic centers in Europe, Asia and Australia. He also received awards for his contributions to the educational programs of the Department of State and Department of Defense. Walker received honorary degrees from Drew University, The Citadel, Seoul National University, and USC. He was also honored by the Republic of China on Taiwan with the Order of the Brilliant Star with Grand Cordon. He was president of the American Association for China Studies, from 1995 to 1997.

Walker died in 2003, and is buried in Berlin, Maryland.

== Works ==
- China Under Communism: The First Five Years
- Hunger in China
- Letters from the Communes

== See also ==
- Ambassadors of the United States

== Notes ==
Diplomatic posts
Preceded by William H. Gleysteen, Jr.	US Ambassador to Korea; 1981–1986	Succeeded by James R. Lilley
