= Winston Lord =

American diplomat (born 1937)

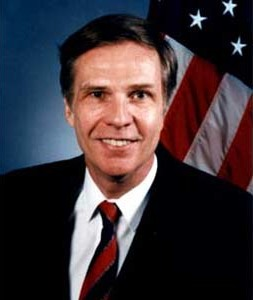
- Lord (c. 1990)

20th Assistant Secretary of State for East Asian and Pacific Affairs
- In office April 23, 1993 – February 18, 1997
- President: Bill Clinton
- Preceded by: William Clark Jr.
- Succeeded by: Stanley O. Roth

3rd United States Ambassador to China
- In office November 19, 1985 – April 23, 1989
- President: Ronald Reagan; George H. W. Bush
- Preceded by: Arthur W. Hummel Jr.
- Succeeded by: James R. Lilley

President of the Council on Foreign Relations
- In office 1977–1985
- Preceded by: Bayless Manning
- Succeeded by: John Temple Swing

10th Director of Policy Planning
- In office 1973–1977
- President: Richard Nixon; Gerald Ford
- Preceded by: James S. Sutterlin
- Succeeded by: Anthony Lake

Personal details
- Born: August 14, 1937 (age 89) New York City, U.S.
- Party: Independent
- Spouse: Bette Bao (m. 1963)
- Children: 2
- Parent: Mary Pillsbury (mother)
- Relatives: Charles Alfred Pillsbury (great-grandfather)
- Education: Yale University (BA); Tufts University (MA)

Winston Lord (born August 14, 1937) is a retired American diplomat. As Special Assistant to the National Security Advisor and then as Director of Policy Planning at the United States Department of State, Lord was a close adviser to Henry Kissinger and was instrumental in bringing about the renormalization of U.S.-China relations in the 1970s.

He later served as President of the Council on Foreign Relations from 1977 to 1985, United States Ambassador to China from 1985 to 1989, and Assistant Secretary of State for East Asian and Pacific Affairs from 1993 to 1997.

== Early life and education ==
Lord was born in New York City on August 14, 1937, as the youngest of three sons born to Oswald Bates Lord, a textile executive for Galey and Lord, which later became a division of Burlington Industries, and Mary Pillsbury Lord, a granddaughter of the Pillsbury Company co-founder Charles Alfred Pillsbury.

His oldest brother, Charles Pillsbury Lord, was a graduate of Yale University, served in the U.S. Air Force, and had a career in business and education. His older brother, Richard, died three months after he was born in 1935 with severe deformities as a result of Mary Lord's exposure to icy waters while pregnant during the sinking of SS Mohawk on January 24, 1935.

Winston Lord's mother, Mary Pillsbury Lord, was a civic leader, activist, and political ally of Dwight D. Eisenhower, having met him while visiting Europe as the chair of Civilian Advisory Committee of the Women's Army Corps. She later worked as a campaign leader for Eisenhower's bid for presidency in 1952, organizing women's votes for Eisenhower. After Eisenhower's victory in 1953, he named Lord as the United States representative to the United Nations Commission on Human Rights, succeeding Eleanor Roosevelt. Winston Lord later credited his mother's career as one of the factors that steered him towards a career in public service and international affairs.

After attending The Buckley School and the Hotchkiss School, Lord graduated magna cum laude from Yale University with a B.A. in English in 1959. He is a member of the Yale secret society Skull and Bones. After graduating from Yale, Lord studied at the Fletcher School of Law and Diplomacy at Tufts University, where he graduated first in his class with an M.A. in 1960.

== Career ==
Lord played a role in the restoration of relations between the United States and China in the early 1970s, and he has been a key figure in US-China relations ever since. From 1969–73, as a member of the United States National Security Council's planning staff, he was the special assistant to National Security Advisor Henry Kissinger, accompanying him on his secret trip to Beijing in 1971. The following year, he was part of the U.S. delegation during President Richard Nixon's historic visit to China, was on President Ford's visit in 1975 and many other Kissinger trips. Lord was in every Nixon, Ford, and Kissinger meeting with Mao Zedong, Zhou Enlai, and Deng Xiaoping during the 1970s.

Lord was also the top assistant on Vietnam negotiations, in every Kissinger meeting with North Vietnam from 1970–1973. Lord was a principal drafter of both the 1972 Shanghai Communiqué, which opened relations with China, and the 1973 Paris Peace Accords, which ended the Vietnam War.

Lord became the State Department's Director of Policy Planning and top policy adviser on China (1973–77), United States Ambassador to China (1985–1989) under President Reagan, and Assistant Secretary of State for East Asian and Pacific Affairs (1993–1997) under President Clinton. Early in his career he served in the Foreign Service and the Defense Department. He was a senior counselor for the President's National Bi-partisan Commission on Central America (1983–1984).

Between governmental posts Ambassador Lord has headed and helped direct many private organizations related to international affairs. He served as President of the Council on Foreign Relations (1977–1985). He was co-Chairman of the International Rescue Committee Board and Overseers, Chairman of the National Endowment for Democracy, and Chairman of the Carnegie Endowment National Commission on America and the New World (1992). He is currently a director of the U.S. Committee for Human Rights in North Korea., a global advisor to the Women's Tennis Association, Chair Emeritus of the International Rescue Committee, trustee of the Trilateral Commission, Vice Chair of the NCAFP Northeast Asia Security Forum, and member of the Council on Foreign Relations. He is a former member of the Steering Committee of the Bilderberg Group.

Lord has also previously served on the Boards or as a member of the America-China Forum, The Fletcher School, National Committee on US-China Relations, US-Japan Foundation, American Academy of Diplomacy, Asia Society, and Aspen Institute Distinguished Fellows.

Lord has written articles in The New York Times, Washington Post, Wall Street Journal, Newsweek, Time, and Foreign Affairs. In 2019, he published Kissinger on Kissinger: Reflections on Diplomacy, Grand Strategy, and Leadership, a book of interviews that Lord conducted with the former National Security Advisor.

In 2020, Lord, along with over 130 other former Republican national security officials, signed a statement that asserted that President Trump was unfit to serve another term, and "To that end, we are firmly convinced that it is in the best interest of our nation that Vice President Joe Biden be elected as the next President of the United States, and we will vote for him."

Lord is a participant of the Task Force on U.S.-China Policy convened by Asia Society's Center on US-China Relations.

== Personal life ==
Lord has been married since 1963 to author and human rights activist Bette Bao Lord and has two children, Elizabeth Pillsbury and Winston Bao.

Diplomatic posts
Preceded by Arthur W. Hummel Jr.	United States Ambassador to China; 1985–1989	Succeeded by James R. Lilley
Government offices
Preceded by William Clark Jr.	Assistant Secretary of State for East Asian and Pacific Affairs; April 23, 1993–February 18, 1997	Succeeded by Stanley O. Roth
