= John R. Hubbard =

American academic, educator, and diplomat

John Hubbard

United States Ambassador to India
- In office December 27, 1988 – November 15, 1989
- President: Ronald Reagan And George H W Bush
- Preceded by: John Gunther Dean
- Succeeded by: William Clark Jr.

8th President of the University of Southern California
- In office 1970–1980
- Preceded by: Norman Topping
- Succeeded by: James Zumberge

Personal details
- Born: John Randolph Hubbard; December 3, 1918 Belton, Texas, U.S.
- Died: August 21, 2011 (aged 92) Rancho Mirage, California, U.S.
- Party: Republican
- Education: University of Texas at Austin (BA, MA, PhD)

Military service
- Allegiance: United States
- Branch/service: United States Navy

John Randolph Hubbard (December 3, 1918 – August 21, 2011) was an American educator, academic administrator, and diplomat who served as the eighth president of the University of Southern California from 1970 and 1980.

== Early life and education ==
Hubbard was born and raised in Belton, Texas. He earned his Bachelor of Arts, Master of Arts, and PhD in history from the University of Texas at Austin. As an undergraduate at the University of Texas, he became a member of the Delta Kappa Epsilon fraternity. Dr. Hubbard was the son of Dr.L.H. Hubbard, president of Texas Woman's University from 1926 to 1950.

== Career ==
After serving as the private secretary to the commissioner of the Interstate Commerce Commission from 1938 to 1941, Hubbard became a pilot in the United States Navy during World War II, winning four Air Medals. Hubbard participated in Navy flight training with Joseph P. Kennedy Jr., the older brother of John F. Kennedy.

=== Academics ===
Hubbard began his career in academics as assistant professor at Louisiana State University. He later became a visiting professor at Yale University, and later served as dean and professor of history at Tulane University.

Hubbard became the eighth president of the University of Southern California in 1970, succeeding Norman Topping. He had served as USC vice president and provost in 1969 after spending four years in India as chief education adviser to the United States Agency for International Development.

In 1970, USC became a member of the Association of American Universities. Between 1970 and 1980, USC rose from 33 to 19 in National Science Foundation federal research rankings and applications rose from 4,100 to more than 11,000. Hubbard's Toward Century II campaign, started in 1976, raised more than $306 million. During his time as president, Hubbard also became friendly with Gerald Ford, and the two placed wagers on the outcome of the 1977 Rose Bowl during a campaign stop. Hubbard left USC in 1980, and was succeeded as president by James Zumberge.

=== Ambassador to India ===
He served as the United States Ambassador to India from 1988 to 1989 under President George H. W. Bush.

=== Later career ===
Hubbard continued to teach history during his term as president and afterward, until shortly before his death. Hubbard served on the USC Board of Trustees. USC's Student Services building was renamed John Hubbard Hall in September 2003.

Hubbard was awarded honorary degrees from Hebrew Union College-Jewish Institute of Religion, Westminster College, the College of the Ozarks, and USC Gould School of Law.

== Personal life ==
Hubbard was a lifelong Republican, but supported the John Kerry 2004 presidential campaign. Hubbard died in Rancho Mirage, California, on August 12, 2011, at the age of 92.

Academic offices
Preceded by Norman Topping	President of the University of Southern California; 1970–1980	Succeeded by James H. Zumberge
Diplomatic posts
Preceded by John Gunther Dean	United States Ambassador to India; 1988–1989	Succeeded by William Clark, Jr.
