= Walter S. Robertson =

4th Assistant Secretary of State for Far Eastern Affairs
- In office April 8, 1953 – June 30, 1959
- Preceded by: John Moore Allison
- Succeeded by: J. Graham Parsons

Personal details
- Born: 1893
- Died: 1970

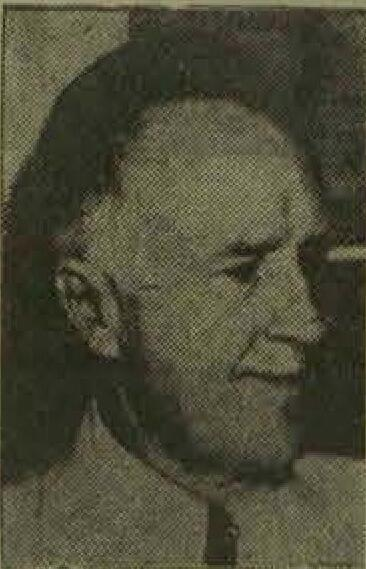

Walter Spencer Robertson (1893–1970) was United States Assistant Secretary of State for Far Eastern Affairs from April 8, 1953, until June 30, 1959.

Government offices
Preceded by John Moore Allison	Assistant Secretary of State for Far Eastern Affairs; April 8, 1953 – June 30, 1959	Succeeded by J. Graham Parsons
