= William Clark Jr. (diplomat) =

American diplomat (1930–2008)

19th Assistant Secretary of State for East Asian and Pacific Affairs
- In office July 10, 1992 – April 23, 1993
- President: George H. W. Bush
- Preceded by: Richard H. Solomon
- Succeeded by: Winston Lord

United States Ambassador to India
- In office October 10, 1989 – July 2, 1992
- President: George H. W. Bush
- Preceded by: John R. Hubbard
- Succeeded by: Thomas R. Pickering

Personal details
- Born: October 12, 1930 Oakland, California, U.S.
- Died: January 22, 2008 (aged 77) Washington, D.C., U.S.
- Education: San Jose State University (BA); USC Gould School of Law (JD); Columbia University (MA)

William Clark Jr. (October 12, 1930 – January 22, 2008) was an American diplomat who served as Assistant Secretary of State for East Asian and Pacific Affairs and U.S. Ambassador to India.

== Early life and education ==
Clark was born in Oakland, California. He earned a bachelor's degree from San Jose State University, a Juris Doctor from the USC Gould School of Law, and a Master's degree from the Columbia University School of International Affairs. He served in the United States Navy from 1949 to 1953.

== Career ==
Clark began his career at the United States Department of State as Principal Deputy Assistant Secretary of the Bureau of East Asian and Pacific Affairs. Prior to this, he served for four years as Minister and deputy chief of mission for the Embassy of the United States, Tokyo, and as deputy chief of mission and Chargé d'affaires for the U.S. Embassy in Cairo, Egypt.

After retired from the United States Foreign Service, Clark was president of the Japan Society. He also worked as Managing Director of Hills and Company, an international trade consultancy firm based in Washington, D.C.

Clark received numerous awards, including the Order of the Sacred Treasure Gold and Silver Star, conferred by the Emperor of Japan (2000), and the Department of State Distinguished Honor Award (1989).

== Personal life ==
Clark was married and had one son.

Diplomatic posts
Preceded by John R. Hubbard	United States Ambassador to India; 1989–1992	Succeeded by Thomas R. Pickering
Government offices
Preceded by Richard H. Solomon	Assistant Secretary of State for East Asian and Pacific Affairs; July 10, 1992 – April 23, 1993	Succeeded by Winston Lord
