= Mary Pillsbury Lord =

American civic worker

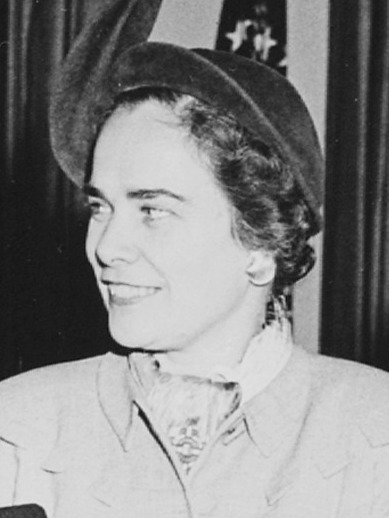
- Lord in 1949
- Born: November 14, 1904; Minneapolis, Minnesota, US
- Died: July 21, 1978 (aged 73)
- Other names: Mrs. Oswald B. Lord
- Spouse: Oswald Bates Lord
- Children: 3
- Relatives: Winston Lord (son)

Mary Pillsbury Lord (November 14, 1904 – July 21, 1978) was an American civic worker and officer in several charitable organizations, as well as serving as a U.S. delegate to the United Nations General Assembly.

== Early life ==
Lord was born as Mary Stinson Pillsbury in Minneapolis, Minnesota. Lord's father was Charles Stinson Pillsbury. Lord's mother was Helen Pendleton Winston. Lord had five siblings, including Philip Winston Pillsbury and Katharine Pillsbury. Lord's grandfather was the founder of the Pillsbury Company.

== Education ==
In 1927, Lord graduated cum laude from Smith College. In 1953, Lord earned an honorary doctor of law degree from Smith College.

== Career ==
Lord began her career with family welfare work in Minneapolis from 1927 to 1929. Lord was a member of Junior League of Minneapolis in Minneapolis. Lord became a volunteer case work for the Charity Organization Society in New York City. Lord became the president of the Junior League of the City of New York from 1936 to 1938. During World War II she served as Assistant Regional Director of the Office of Civilian Defense and in 1944 was appointed chairman of the National Civilian Advisory Committee of the Women's Army Corps WAC.

In 1948, Lord was the organizer and elected as chairman of the U.S. Commission of UNICEF.

In 1952, Lord was a campaign leader for Eisenhower and she became the co-chairman of the Citizens for Eisenhower organization.

In 1953 Lord was appointed by President Dwight D. Eisenhower to succeed Eleanor Roosevelt as the U.S. representative to the United Nations Human Rights Commission. Lord also was a U.S. alternate representative and U.S. delegate to the United Nations General Assembly.

After resigning from the United Nations in 1961 she chaired the New York Governor's Committee on the Education and Employment of Women; worked with the Citizens for Peace with Freedom in Vietnam Committee; was president of the International Rescue Committee; and a governor of the Atlantic Institute.

Mary, along with her sister, Katherine Pillsbury McKee, was a survivor of the sinking of the Ward Line steam ship SS Mohawk, which occurred on January 24, 1935. The 6000 ton-steam ship collided with a Norwegian freighter off the New Jersey coast. 15 passengers and 32 crew died.

== Personal life ==
On December 7, 1929, in Minneapolis, Lord married Oswald Bates Lord, a businessman in the textile industry. They had three sons.

On July 21, 1978 Lord died at from cancer at her home in New York City, New York.

== See also ==
- Charles Alfred Pillsbury
