= Robert A. Kehoe =

American toxicologist and lead advocate

Robert Arthur Kehoe
- Kehoe in the 1930s
- Born: November 18, 1893; Georgetown, Ohio
- Died: November 24, 1992 (aged 99); Cincinnati
- Education: Ohio State University
- Alma mater: University of Cincinnati
- Known for: Denying the toxicity of lead; Advocating for tetraethyllead as an additive in gasoline; "Kehoe Rule"
- Spouse: Lucille Marshall
- Scientific career
- Fields: Toxicology, occupational health
- Workplaces: University of Cincinnati Kettering Laboratory of Applied Physiology (1930-1965)

Robert Arthur Kehoe (/ˈkiːhoʊ/; November 18, 1893 – November 24, 1992) was an American toxicologist and a dominant figure in occupational health. Working on behalf of the lead industry (including the manufacturing of leaded gasoline and lead-acid batteries), Kehoe was the most powerful medically-trained proponent for the use of tetraethyllead as an additive in gasoline.

== Family and education ==
Kehoe was born in Georgetown, Ohio, on November 18, 1893, to Jeremiah and Jessie Kehoe.

He studied at Ohio State University. After his graduation at the University of Cincinnati (UC) medical school in 1920 he was a resident in pathology at the Cincinnati General Hospital.

Shortly after obtaining his M.D. he married Lucille Marshall.

== Occupational health ==
When he was an instructor in the UC Department of Physiology in 1924, he was hired by Charles Kettering for General Motors (GM) to examine health issues related to the production of tetraethyllead (TEL). In 1925 Kehoe became the chief medical advisor of TEL maker Ethyl Corporation, a position he held until his retirement.

In 1930, he became the director of the newly created University of Cincinnati (UC) Kettering Laboratory of Applied Physiology, the first university-based laboratory devoted to toxicological problems peculiar to industry. The laboratory was funded by the stakeholder companies, GM, DuPont, and Ethyl Corporation.

At the Kettering Laboratory, Kehoe was commissioned by DuPont to produce a study with the goal of showing that the carcinogen 2-Naphthylamine, then widely used by DuPont and shown to produce cancer in nine out of ten employees exposed to it, was safe. Kehoe was named Professor of Industrial Medicine at UC and put together an interdisciplinary team to investigate occupational-health issues.

Kehoe performed industry-sponsored research that spanned decades. One of the people who was involved in this research was a co-author, Ivan F. Ferneau, who Kehoe said was administered potentially dangerous amounts of lead.

From at least 1948 though 1968, Kehoe was involved with the Electric Storage Battery Company lead-acid battery factory in Crescentville (Philadelphia), PA.

== Advocacy of lead in gasoline ==
Working at the GM Research Laboratory at Dayton, Ohio, Charles F. Kettering and his assistant Thomas Midgley Jr. studied anti-knocking agents. In 1921, the team directed by Midgley discovered TEL's anti-knocking property, which would eliminate the knock in internal combustion engines, allowing them to be built with higher compression ratios. GM proceeded to file a patent for the use of TEL as an additive in gasoline. In August 1924, after Standard Oil of New Jersey discovered a lower-cost method to synthesize TEL, it teamed up with GM to establish the Ethyl Gasoline Corporation to produce TEL as a gasoline additive with the help of DuPont. Soon, workers at Ethyl plants fell ill and a number of them died from lead poisoning. Kettering hired Kehoe to develop protocols for the workers handling TEL. Kehoe soon became the main medical advocate for the position that the use of TEL in gasoline is safe and gained prominence as the industry's expert at government and public health hearings. As almost all research support concerning leaded gasoline came from industry, and most was channeled to him, he held "an almost complete monopoly" on data for half a century. Kehoe claimed that presence of lead in humans and other organisms was normal and that exposure to low lead levels was not harmful.

Although lead had been known to be highly toxic since antiquity, Kehoe’s beliefs were not seriously contested until after Clair Cameron Patterson’s publication in 1965. Patterson argued that global lead contamination was taking place and that it had started gradually with the Industrial Revolution but had been markedly accelerated once leaded gasoline had entered the market.

In a 1966 government hearing chaired by Senator Edmund Muskie, Kehoe stated that his laboratory "was the only source of new information (about lead exposure)" and "had wide influence (in the US and abroad) in shaping the point of view and activities... of those who are responsible for industrial and public hygiene".

Because leaded gasoline had been found "safe" by the U.S. Surgeon General in the 1920s (see below), and ambient lead had been "demonstrated" through Kehoe's work to not constitute a public health hazard over the succeeding decades, it took years for Patterson's findings to change the prevailing view of the toxicity of ambient lead. The validation of Patterson's refutation of Kehoe's research required new, more precise research by several others, but ultimately the medical/public health argument prevailed. Kehoe's work is now considered discredited. By 2014, a majority of countries had discontinued the use of leaded gasoline in automobiles. Yet leaded gasoline continues to be produced and used, for example, for private aviation in the United States.

== Surgeon General's review of gasoline lead and the Kehoe Rule ==
Yandell Henderson, Alice Hamilton and others raised doubts about the safety of tetraethyl lead early on. When the public became aware that workers at TEL plants had fallen ill and deaths had occurred, the Surgeon General, Dr. Hugh Smith Cumming, called for a conference, and TEL production was voluntarily suspended. At the conference, held May 20, 1925, the advocates of lead argued that the use of leaded gasoline raised public health issues that were novel. They also asked to be informed what their duty was, implying that they were not guilty of violating any rule because no rule had previously been established. Portraying their responsibility as a blank slate opened up the issue to be addressed by a new policy approach, and Dr. Kehoe provided the logic that would resolve the controversy by filling in that blank. In his testimony at the conference, Kehoe offered (speaking on behalf of the companies engaged in the Ethyl Gasoline enterprise) to discontinue the sale of gasoline containing lead "if it can be shown ... that an actual danger is had as a result..." But, he reasoned, if it could not be shown "on the basis of facts," a product this economically beneficial should not be "thrown into the discard on the basis of opinions." Kehoe's offer thus acted as a decision rule (hence, "the Kehoe Rule"), setting out a choice point and two alternative paths that could be followed, depending on what was shown as proof at that choice point.

The Kehoe Rule had two significant characteristics. First, it placed the burden of proof on the opponents of tetraethyl lead, who would have to show that use of TEL was unsafe if any constraint on its use were to be instituted. If the finding of fact was inconclusive and did not provide an uncontestable showing of proof, then TEL would be allowed. Second, it balanced the interest in protecting public health against the economic benefits of TEL, which the advocates of TEL had promised would be in the form of conservation of fuel. The alternative approach, the precautionary principle, would have required proof that TEL was safe before it could be used. While the Kehoe Paradigm (or Kehoe Rule) assumes that in the absence of clear evidence of risk, there is no risk of significance, the precautionary principle assumes that there is a possible risk until it is proved otherwise. Nriagu asserted that with the large investments by industry, the social and economic climate of the time, and the belief in progress, the outcome of the 1925 conference was preordained. TEL production resumed, and soon, leaded gasoline was commonly used. That there were alternatives to the use of TEL was falsely denied by the industry.

Application of the Kehoe Rule made it critical for the industry to fund and control the research in lead toxicity. That was done through the Kettering Laboratory, under Kehoe’s direction. The Kehoe Rule was beneficial to those engaged in the gasoline lead industry, as all that was necessary was to characterize any criticism as fraught with uncertainty. In the case of lead toxicity, Kehoe's laboratory dominated the scene for decades, attesting to the safety of leaded gasoline and deconstructing any criticism. The credibility of Kehoe's research was bolstered for decades by the support of the US Public Health Service and American Medical Association.

Using the Kehoe Rule, Ethyl Corporation was a winner in either situation: if its product was actually safe, Ethyl would be seen as a responsible party. If, however, its product was unsafe, it would take decades to demonstrate that with certainty. The process of getting to certainty could be prolonged by challenging the methods and results and calling for more data, and while it was going on the product would continue to generate profits. Kitman indicates that the strategy taken by the lead industry, referring to use of the Kehoe Rule, similarly "provided a model for the asbestos, tobacco, pesticide and nuclear power industries, and other(s)... for evading clear evidence that their products are harmful by hiding behind the mantle of scientific uncertainty." Kettering Laboratories under Kehoe's leadership also certified the safety of the fluorinated refrigerant, Freon, "another environmentally insensitive GM patent that would earn hundreds of millions before it was outlawed."

== Death ==
Kehoe retired in 1965. He became Professor Emeritus of Occupational Medicine at the University of Cincinnati upon his retirement. Kehoe Hall, part of the Kettering Lab Complex at the university, was completed in 1963 and is named in his honor. Kehoe wrote of having an illness in 1973. He died in Cincinnati in 1992 at the age of 99.
