= List of ambassadors of the United States to Indonesia =

Ambassador of the United States to Indonesia
- Duta Besar Amerika Serikat ke Indonesia
- Seal of the United States Department of State

- Flag of a United States ambassador

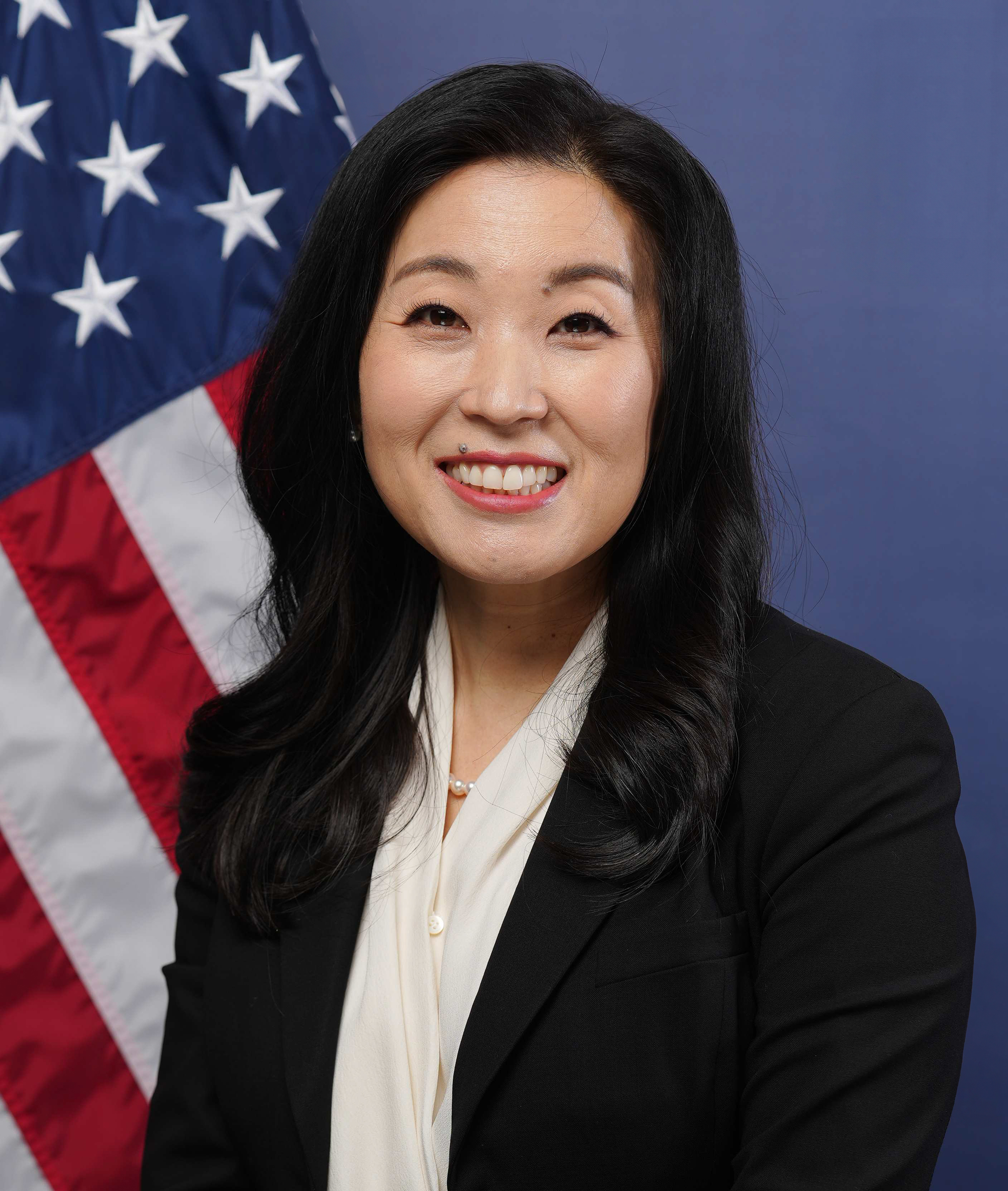
- Incumbent; Joy Michiko Sakurai; Chargé d'affaires since June 30, 2026
- Nominator: The president of the United States
- Appointer: The president with Senate advice and consent
- Inaugural holder: H. Merle Cochran as Ambassador Extraordinary and Plenipotentiary
- Formation: December 27, 1949
- Website: U.S. Embassy - Jakarta

This is a list of ambassadors of the United States to the Republic of Indonesia.

Indonesia had been a Dutch colony since 1800, known as the Dutch East Indies. The Dutch were expelled in March 1942 by the Japanese occupation of the Dutch East Indies. After the surrender of Japan in 1945, Sukarno declared independence on August 17, 1945. However, the Netherlands attempted to reestablish their colony during a prolonged war that lasted for four and a half years. Ultimately the struggle was unsuccessful for the Netherlands, and in December 1949, the Netherlands formally recognized Indonesian sovereignty.

The United States immediately recognized the independence of Indonesia and moved to establish diplomatic relations. A U.S. embassy was established in Jakarta on December 27, 1949, under the informal direction of a consul general. President Truman appointed H. Merle Cochran as ambassador the following day.

The United States Embassy in Indonesia is located in Jakarta, with consulates in Surabaya and Medan, and a consular agency in Bali.

== Ambassadors ==
Name	Title	Appointed	Presented credentials	Terminated mission	Notes
H. Merle Cochran – Career FSO	Ambassador Extraordinary and Plenipotentiary	December 28, 1949	December 30, 1949	February 27, 1953	
Hugh S. Cumming, Jr. – Career FSO	Ambassador Extraordinary and Plenipotentiary	September 3, 1953	October 15, 1953	March 3, 1957	
John M. Allison – Career FSO	Ambassador Extraordinary and Plenipotentiary	February 21, 1957	March 13, 1957	January 29, 1958	
Howard P. Jones – Career FSO	Ambassador Extraordinary and Plenipotentiary	February 20, 1958	March 10, 1958	May 24, 1965	
Marshall Green – Career FSO	Ambassador Extraordinary and Plenipotentiary	June 4, 1965	July 26, 1965	March 26, 1969	
Francis J. Galbraith – Career FSO	Ambassador Extraordinary and Plenipotentiary	May 27, 1969	July 19, 1969	February 3, 1974	
David D. Newsom – Career FSO	Ambassador Extraordinary and Plenipotentiary	December 19, 1973	February 27, 1974	October 6, 1977	
Edward E. Masters – Career FSO	Ambassador Extraordinary and Plenipotentiary	November 3, 1977	December 10, 1977	November 10, 1981	John Cameron Monjo served as Chargé d'Affaires ad interim, November 1981–February 1983.
John Herbert Holdridge – Career FSO	Ambassador Extraordinary and Plenipotentiary	December 10, 1982	February 19, 1983	January 7, 1986	
Paul Dundes Wolfowitz – Political appointee	Ambassador Extraordinary and Plenipotentiary	March 4, 1986	April 11, 1986	May 12, 1989	
John Cameron Monjo – Career FSO	Ambassador Extraordinary and Plenipotentiary	May 22, 1989	May 31, 1989	July 18, 1992	
Robert L. Barry – Career FSO	Ambassador Extraordinary and Plenipotentiary	July 7, 1992	August 11, 1992	July 10, 1995	
J. Stapleton Roy – Career FSO	Ambassador Extraordinary and Plenipotentiary	December 19, 1995	February 27, 1996	August 12, 1999	
Robert S. Gelbard – Career FSO	Ambassador Extraordinary and Plenipotentiary	August 9, 1999	October 18, 1999	October 14, 2001	
Ralph Leo Boyce – Career FSO	Ambassador Extraordinary and Plenipotentiary	October 1, 2001	October 24, 2001	August. 2, 2004	
B. Lynn Pascoe – Career FSO	Ambassador Extraordinary and Plenipotentiary	October 18, 2004	November 25, 2004	February 17, 2007	
Cameron R. Hume – Career FSO	Ambassador Extraordinary and Plenipotentiary	May 30, 2007	August 1, 2007	August 7, 2010	
Scot Marciel - Career FSO	Ambassador Extraordinary and Plenipotentiary	August 10, 2010	September 21, 2010	July 18, 2013	
Robert O. Blake, Jr. - Career FSO	Ambassador Extraordinary and Plenipotentiary	July 30, 2013	January 30, 2014	July 18, 2016	
Joseph R. Donovan Jr. - Career FSO	Ambassador Extraordinary and Plenipotentiary	November 4, 2016	January 13, 2017	February 14, 2020	
Heather Variava - Career FSO	Chargé d'Affaires ad interim	February 14, 2020		October 21, 2020	
Sung Kim - Career FSO	Ambassador Extraordinary and Plenipotentiary	August 6, 2020	October 21, 2020	November 21, 2023	
Michael F. Kleine - Career FSO	Chargé d'Affaires ad interim	November 21, 2023		July 23, 2024	
Kamala Shirin Lakhdhir - Career FSO	Ambassador Extraordinary and Plenipotentiary	May 2, 2024	August 8, 2024	April 30, 2025	
Heather C. Merritt - Career FSO	Chargé d'Affaires ad interim	May 1, 2025		June 15, 2025	
Peter Haymond - Career FSO	Chargé d'Affaires ad interim	June 15, 2025		June 30, 2026	
Joy Michiko Sakurai - Career FSO	Chargé d'Affaires ad interim	June 30, 2026		Incumbent	

== See also ==
- Embassy of the United States, Jakarta
- Indonesia – United States relations
- Foreign relations of Indonesia
- Ambassadors of the United States
