= J. Graham Parsons =

American diplomat (1907–1991)

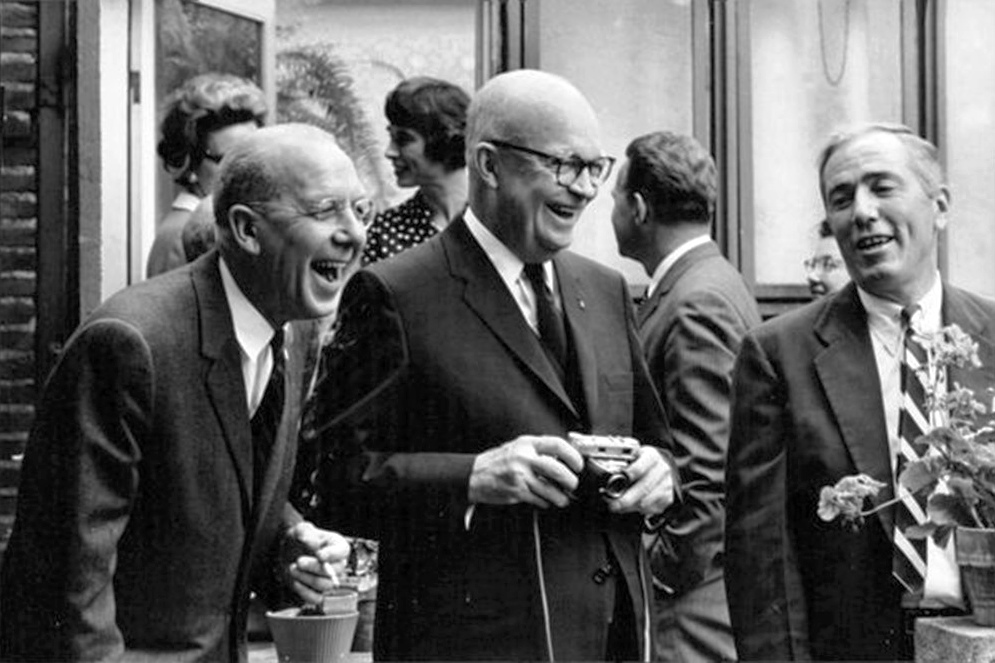
- Parsons (far right) with former president Dwight D. Eisenhower in Stockholm in July 1962
- Born: October 28, 1907; New York City
- Died: October 20, 1991 (aged 83); Lyme, Connecticut
- Education: Groton School, Yale University
- Occupation: diplomat
- Spouse: Margaret Josephine Boulton
- Children: 2 daughters

J. Graham Parsons

5th Assistant Secretary of State for Far Eastern Affairs
- In office July 1, 1959 – March 30, 1961
- Preceded by: Walter S. Robertson
- Succeeded by: Walter P. McConaughy

James Graham Parsons (October 28, 1907 – October 20, 1991) was an American career diplomat who served as United States Ambassador to Laos (1956–1958), Assistant Secretary of State for East Asian and Pacific Affairs (1959–1961), and United States Ambassador to Sweden (1961–1967).

== Biography ==
James Graham Parsons was born in New York City on October 28, 1907. He was educated at Groton School, graduating in 1925, and Yale University, receiving his B.A. in 1929.

Upon graduation, he entered the United States Foreign Service, and served from 1932 to 1936 as private secretary to Joseph Grew, United States Ambassador to Japan. In 1934, he was on a train in the far north of China in which he survived a shootout between guards and bandits. He left Japan in 1936, upon being promoted to vice consul, holding that position first in Cuba, then in Manchuria, then in Canada. Parsons spent 1943-47 at the United States Department of State in Washington, D.C. as part of the British Commonwealth Affairs Section.

Parsons returned to the field in 1947 as assistant to Myron Charles Taylor, the Personal Representative of the President of the United States to the Vatican, a post he held until 1948. He then spent 1948-50 as Consul in the American Embassy in New Delhi and Kathmandu. Returning to the U.S. in 1950, Parsons was posted at the National War College, and then in 1951 became Deputy Director of the State Department's Office of European Regional Affairs. In 1953, he returned to Japan, serving as Minister and deputy chief of mission in Tokyo until 1956.

In 1956, President Dwight D. Eisenhower appointed Parsons as United States Ambassador to Laos, head of the U.S. embassy in Vientiane, with Parsons presenting his credentials on October 12, 1956. As ambassador to the Kingdom of Laos in the midst of the Laotian Civil War, Parsons is identified with the Eisenhower administration's support of the Royal Lao Government against the Pathet Lao. His mission to Laos ended February 8, 1958. Parsons continued to support the administration's Laotian policy in 1959-61, during which time he served as Assistant Secretary of State for East Asian and Pacific Affairs. (He assumed office on July 1, 1959, and relinquished office March 30, 1961.) Testifying to the United States Congress in March 1961, Parsons said "the responsibility of the United States in Laos is indeed a very great one, and I hope there will be no misunderstanding of our firmness and steadiness." In his 1965 book A Thousand Days, Arthur M. Schlesinger, Jr. was highly critical of Ambassador Parsons' approach to Laos (Schlesinger favored American neutralism between the royalists and the rebels), saying that Parsons "drastically misconceived the situation". Parsons never publicly responded to this or other similar criticisms.

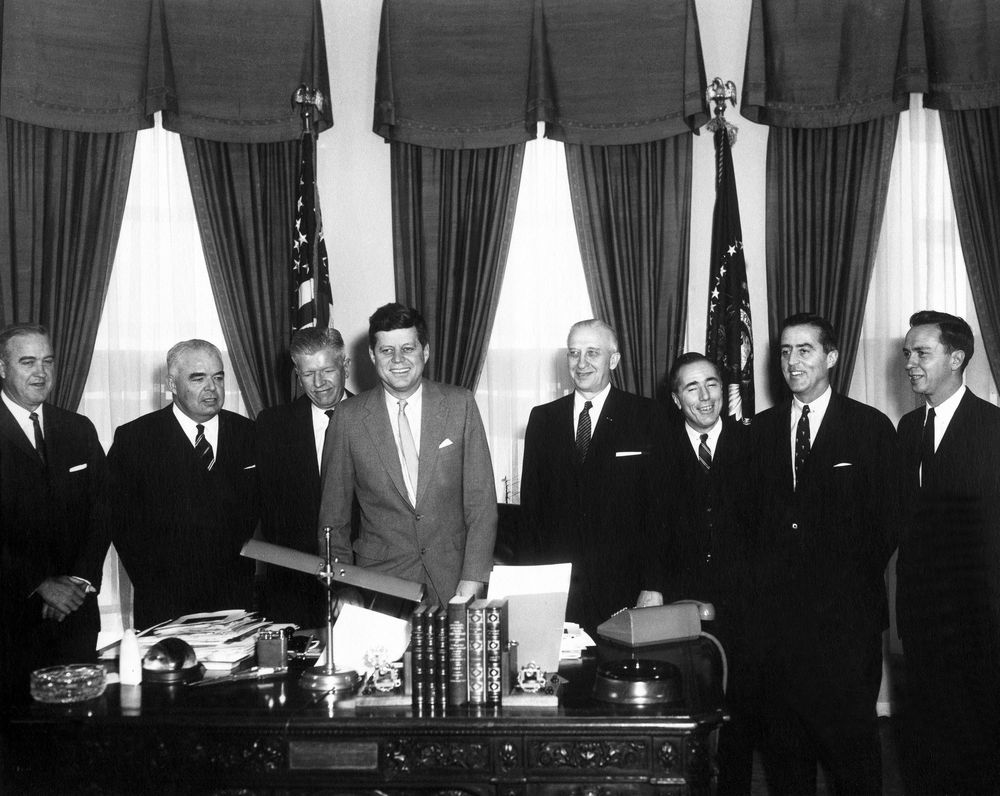
Parsons (third from right) with President Kennedy and other ambassadors in March 1961

On March 15, 1961, President John F. Kennedy named Parsons United States Ambassador to Sweden, heading up the embassy in the Diplomatstaden, Stockholm. Closely identified with American policy towards Southeast Asia, Parsons became the focus of criticism in Sweden as Swedish opposition to the United States' role in the Vietnam War mounted throughout the 1960s. Parsons left his post as Ambassador to Sweden on April 17, 1967, and less than a year later, his successor, William Womack Heath, was recalled to protest the participation of Swedish education minister Olof Palme in an anti-Vietnam War protest. The U.S. would not appoint a new ambassador to Sweden until 1970.

Parsons served as deputy chairman of the U.S. delegation to the Strategic Arms Limitation Talks from 1970 until he retired from the Foreign Service in 1972. In his later years, Parsons lived in Stockbridge, Massachusetts, and he died while visiting friends in Lyme, Connecticut on October 20, 1991.

Parsons married Margaret Josephine Boulton in 1936. She died in 1987. Together they had two daughters, Margaret and Jane.

Diplomatic posts
Preceded by Charles Woodruff Yost	U.S. Ambassador to Laos; October 12, 1956 – February 8, 1958	Succeeded by Horace H. Smith
Preceded by James C.H. Bonbright	U.S. Ambassador to Sweden; May 16, 1961 – April 17, 1967	Succeeded by William Womack Heath
Government offices
Preceded by Walter S. Robertson	Assistant Secretary of State for East Asian and Pacific Affairs; July 1, 1959 – March 30, 1961	Succeeded by Walter P. McConaughy
