= William H. Gleysteen =

American diplomat (1926-2002)

William Henry Gleysteen Jr.
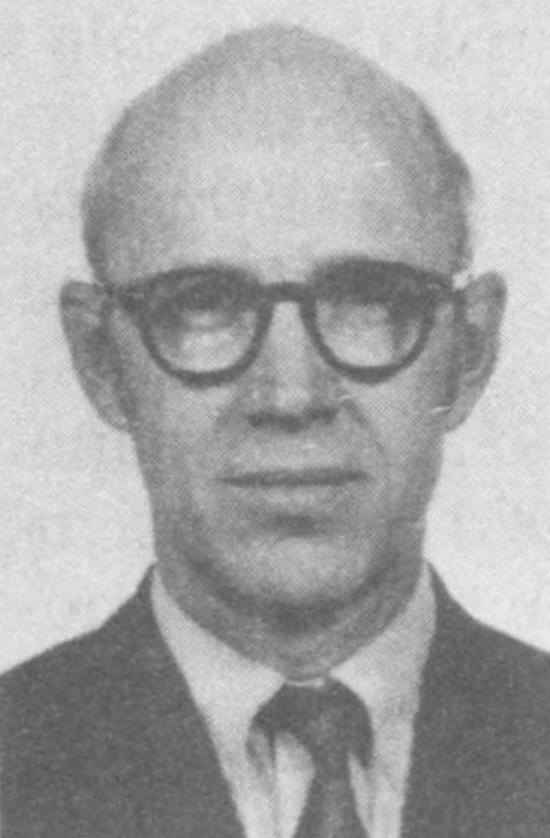
- Gleysteen as deputy assistant secretary for East Asian and Pacific affairs

United States Ambassador to South Korea
- In office June 27, 1978 – June 10, 1981
- President: Jimmy Carter
- Preceded by: Richard Lee Sneider
- Succeeded by: Richard Louis Walker

Personal details
- Born: William Henry Gleysteen Jr. May 8, 1926 Peking, China
- Died: December 6, 2002 (aged 76) Washington, D.C.
- Spouse(s): Zoe Clubb (divorced); Marilyn Wong Gleysteen
- Children: 4
- Education: Yale University
- Profession: Diplomat

Military service
- Allegiance: United States
- Branch/service: United States Navy
- Years of service: 1943–1945

William Henry Gleysteen Jr. (May 8, 1926 – December 6, 2002) was an American diplomat. Born and raised in Beijing, China, Gleysteen graduated from Yale University and began working for the United States Department of State in 1951. He served as United States' Ambassador to South Korea between 1978 and 1981.

== Early life ==
Gleysteen was born in Peking, China, to American parents who were Presbyterian missionaries, Theodora (Culver) and William Henry Gleysteen. His paternal grandparents were Dutch. Gleysteen grew up in Beijing and attended the Peking American School. His father was principal of a large middle school for boys, where his mother also taught. Japan controlled Peking starting in 1937, and after the Pearl Harbor attack Gleysteen and his family were eventually sent to an internment camp in Wei Xian, Shandong. They were repatriated to the United States in December 1943, after which Gleysteen finished his high school education and graduated from Westtown Friends School in Pennsylvania. After graduation he served in the United States Navy for two years, first as a student in the V-12 Navy College Training Program and later as an enlisted sailor. At the end of the war, Gleysteen attended Yale University, where he majored in European intellectual history. He remained at Yale to complete a master's degree in international relations. While at Yale, Gleysteen was influenced by fellow students who were foreign service officers, as well as his older brother Culver, who was already a foreign service officer by that time.

== Career ==
=== Foreign service career ===
Gleysteen joined the State Department's Civil Service in 1951 as a clerk typist in the Executive Secretariat, during the time of Secretaries Dean Acheson and John Foster Dulles. He was converted to a Foreign Service Officer in 1954 as part of a policy (“Wristonization”) adopted by Dulles designed to integrate the Foreign and Civil Services, which caused the Foreign Service to double in size in just four years. Gleysteen subsequently served in Taiwan (twice), Japan, British Hong Kong, and South Korea, along with several assignments in Washington, DC. He spoke Mandarin fluently, having first learned it as a child and then studying it again in Taiwan before beginning his assignment.

=== Ambassador to South Korea ===
Gleysteen was nominated by the Carter administration to serve as the United States Ambassador to South Korea. He arrived in Seoul in June 1978, and stayed until his retirement in 1981. While serving as Ambassador Gleysteen had to contend with several important events which deeply affected the bilateral relationship.

The Koreagate scandal erupted during the 1976 U.S. elections when it came out that members of Congress had accepted bribes from South Korean agents in return for favorable treatment of South Korean interests. This issue was still being investigated when Gleysteen arrived in Seoul in 1978. One of Gleysteen's first tasks as Ambassador was to convey a request from House Speaker Tip O’Neill, which would give two House members access to former South Korean ambassador to the United States Kim Dong-jo and alleged South Korean agent Park Tong-sun. The furor died down several months later following the 1978 U.S. elections.

Another issue during Gleysteen's tenure as Ambassador was President Carter's proposed withdrawal of U.S. troops from the Korean Peninsula. Then-governor Carter had criticized South Korea's human rights record during his presidential campaign, and after assuming the presidency in January 1977, he directed that plans for a full withdrawal be drawn up. Gleysteen opposed the withdrawal and persuaded President Carter to reconsider the policy in a famous exchange in the President's limousine during a 1979 presidential visit to Seoul.

Although the United States generally earned plaudits among South Koreans for its consistent criticism of political repression in the Park and Chun eras, Gleysteen said that those positive emotions were “muffled for many years by emotions and misinformation that mushroomed after the Gwangju Uprising in the spring of 1980.” In his memoirs, Gleysteen said the Gwangju Uprising took place in the context of the long-running democratization movement as well as regional rivalry between the Jeolla Province and Park Chung-hee's native Gyeongsang Province. The proximate cause of the incident was a renewed and extended nationwide state of martial law declared by Chun, along with the arrest of democratization leaders, including Jeolla native Kim Dae-jung. The uprising began on May 18 with a protest by approximately 200 students at the Chonnam National University. A series of violent skirmishes with the police quickly increased the number of protestors, and by May 20 the number of protesters had grown to 10,000. On May 21 a group of students, workers, and other citizens of Gwangju attacked government buildings, seizing weapons and ammunition. As the rebellion unfolded, Ambassador Gleysteen and General Wickham (commander of the United Nations Command at that time) criticized military and political leaders for their handling of the incident, and on May 21 the South Korean troops were withdrawn to the edge of the city, beginning a standoff which continued until May 27, when some 6,000 troops entered Gwangju, ending the rebellion. During the uprising but before the outbreak of serious violence, Gleysteen met with General Chun to urge restraint with regard to the student protests, and received multiple assurances that the South Korean government was "very aware of the danger of over reaction and the use of military force," and that "the president was determined to go to great lengths to avoid using the army except as an instrument of last resort". President Choi made a speech in June expressing regret for the violent turn of events, but he did not offer an apology, although Gleysteen said that he had encouraged him to do so.

== Personal life ==
Gleysteen married his first wife, Zoe Clubb, in December 1952. They had three children together: Thea Clarke, Guy Gleysteen, and Michael Gleysteen. He married his second wife, Marilyn Wong Gleysteen, in 1981. They had one child together: Anna Wong Gleysteen.

== Later career and death ==
Gleysteen retired from the State Department shortly after stepping down as ambassador. He was subsequently named director of studies at the Council on Foreign Relations. Gleysteen died of leukemia on December 6, 2002, at the Washington Hospice.
