= Mali–United States relations =

- Mali: United States

Mali-United States relations, while historically friendly, were radically altered by the March 2012 military coup in Mali that ousted the previous democratic government. The Mali government was a strong partner with the U.S. in its efforts to combat violent extremists, but the United States officially suspended military relations with Mali following the military coup.

According to a 2007 global opinion poll, 79% of Malians view the United States favorably. According to the 2012 U.S. Global Leadership Report, 87% of Malians approve of U.S. leadership, with 10% disapproving and 4% uncertain, the second-highest rating of the U.S. for any surveyed country in Africa.

== History ==
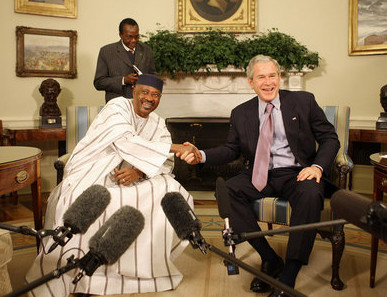
Malian President Amadou Toumani Touré with U.S. President George W. Bush in 2008

The United States and Mali established diplomatic relations on September 24, 1960.

Mali was a regional partner in the Global War on Terrorism. Mali was also active in testing new anti-malaria medicines for use by American citizen travelers and for research focused on Africa. US organizations involved include USAID and the Peace Corps. Prior to the March 2012 military coup, USAID programs aimed to consolidate the peace process in northern Mali and the region's socioeconomic and political integration. In response to the coup, all aid from the United States was cut off.

Principal U.S. Officials include:

- Ambassador Gillian Milovanovic
- Deputy Chief of Mission--Peter Barlerin
- Director, USAID Mission--Rebecca Black
- Director, Peace Corps--Michael Simsik
- Public Affairs Officer—Kate Kaetzer-Hodson
- Management Officer—Matthew Cook
- Political/Economic Officer—Peter Newman
- Consular Officer—Rebecca Drame
- Defense Attaché—LTC Eric Dalton

Since President Donald Trump took office in January 2025, U.S. turned to African countries as destinations for deportations as part of a crackdown on immigration. In October 2025, Mali refused to accept deportees from the United States after Trump suspended visas to the West African country. Mali has announced that American citizens visiting the country will be required to provide a bond of up to $10,000 in response to a similar requirement imposed by the Trump administration on its own citizens.

== Former ambassadors ==
Among the previous eighteen U.S. Ambassadors to Mali are included:

- Robert O. Blake
- Patricia M. Byrne
- Anne Forrester
- Parker W. Borg
- Vicki Huddleston

== Diplomatic missions ==
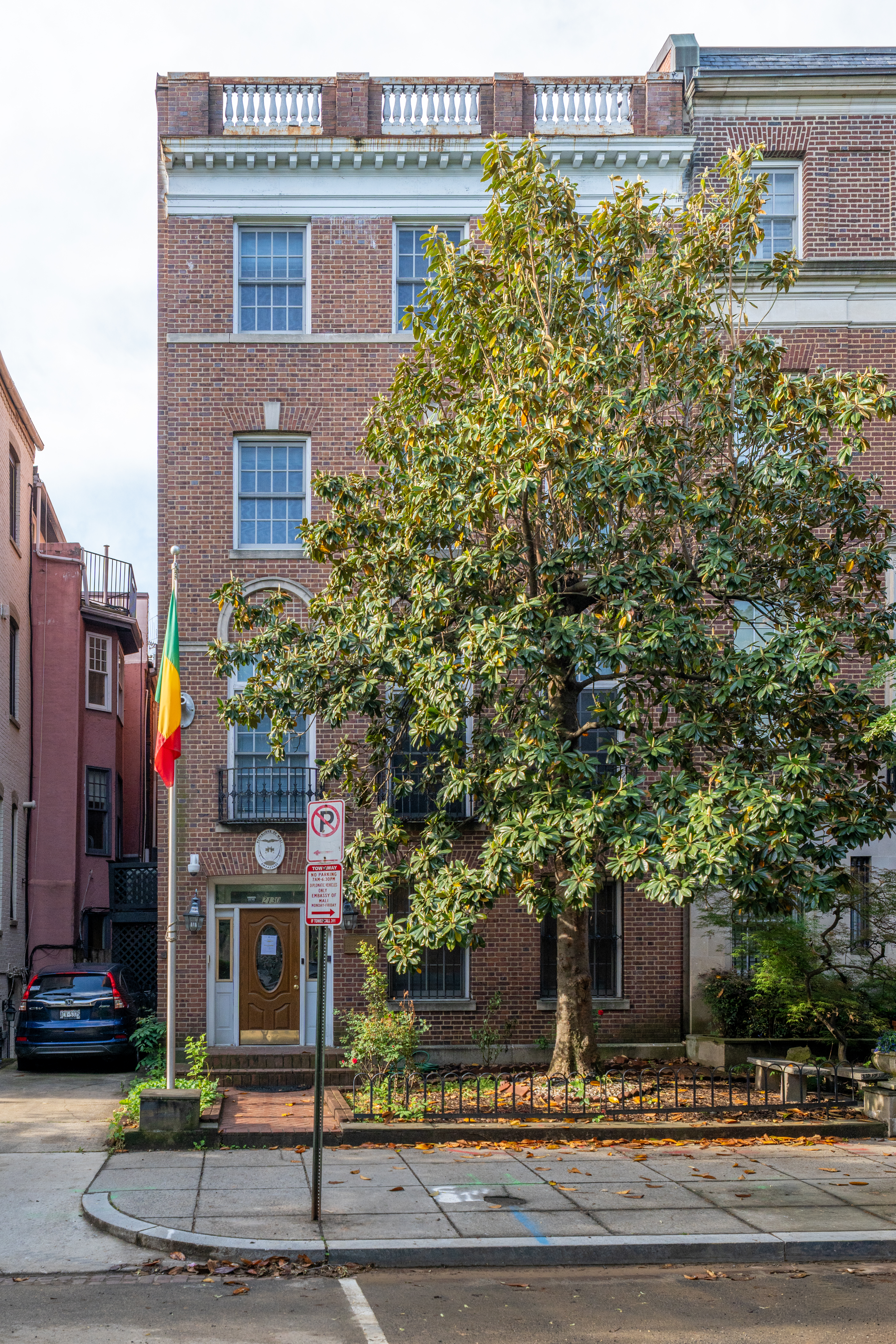
Embassy of Mali in Washington, D.C.

The Embassy of Mali in Washington, D.C. is the diplomatic mission of the Republic of Mali to the United States. The embassy is located at 2130 R Street Northwest in the Kalorama neighborhood of Washington, D.C.

There is a U.S. Embassy in Bamako, Mali.

== See also ==
- Malian Americans
- Foreign relations of Mali
