= Robert O. Blake =

American diplomat

United States Ambassador to Mali
- In office December 10, 1970 – May 20, 1973
- Appointed by: Richard Nixon
- Preceded by: G. Edward Clark
- Succeeded by: Patricia M. Byrne

Personal details
- Born: Robert Orris Blake; April 7, 1921 Los Angeles, California, US
- Died: December 28, 2015 (aged 94) Washington, D.C., US
- Spouse: Sylvia Whitehouse (m. 1956)
- Children: 3, including Robert Jr., Lucy
- Parent(s): Frank Orris Blake; Marjorie Edwards
- Education: Stanford University; Johns Hopkins University

Robert Orris Blake (April 7, 1921 – December 28, 2015) was an American diplomat who served as the United States Ambassador to Mali from 1970 to 1973.

== Early life ==
Blake was born in Los Angeles, California, on April 7, 1921, and grew up in Whittier, California. He was the son of Frank Orris Blake and Marjorie (née Edwards) Blake.

Blake received a Bachelor of Arts from Stanford University in 1943 and a Master of Arts in 1947 from Johns Hopkins University School of Advanced International Studies. From 1943 to 1946, Blake was a Lieutenant in the U.S. Navy during World War II.

== Career ==
During his 30-year career in United States Foreign service, Blake served as Ambassador to Mali from December 10, 1970, until May 20, 1973, as a member of the Nixon administration, serving under U.S. Secretary of State Henry Kissinger. From August 1968 until December 1970, Blake was Deputy Chief of Mission, Paris. Prior to Paris Blake served in Managua, Nicaragua, Moscow, Russia, Tokyo, Japan, Tunis, Tunisia, and as Deputy Chief of Mission in Kinshasa. He was also the Officer in Charge of U.S.S.R. Affairs, and Advisor on Political and Security Affairs, United States Mission to the United Nations, and United States Representative to the Joint Commission on the Environment.

Blake was the Senior Fellow at the World Resources Institute, where he served as the Chairman of the Committee on Agricultural Sustainability. He was a member of the Council on Foreign Relations, National Advisory Board of the Natural Resources Council of Maine, and the Maine Coast Heritage Trust.

== Personal life ==
On July 28, 1956, Blake was married to Sylvia Whitehouse at the Trinity Episcopal Church in Newport, Rhode Island. Sylvia was the daughter of diplomat Edwin Sheldon Whitehouse and sister of Ambassador Charles S. Whitehouse (father of Sheldon Whitehouse, a current U.S. Senator from Rhode Island). Robert and Sylvia had one daughter and two sons, including:

- Robert O. Blake, Jr., a career diplomat who served as U.S. Ambassador to Sri Lanka and the Maldives, the Assistant Secretary of State for South and Central Asian Affairs and U.S. Ambassador to Indonesia
- Lucy Blake, a conservationist who serves as the president of Northern Sierra Partnership.
- George Whitehouse Blake

Blake died of prostate cancer at his home in Washington, D.C., on December 28, 2015.

Diplomatic posts
Preceded by G. Edward Clark	United States Ambassador to Mali; 1970–1973	Succeeded by Patricia M. Byrne
