= List of ambassadors of the United States to Mali =

United States Ambassador to Mali

Ambassador of the United States to Mali
- Seal of the United States Department of State

- Flag of a United States ambassador

- Incumbent; Wallace R. Bain; Chargé d'affaires since September 5, 2026
- Nominator: The president of the United States
- Appointer: The president; with Senate advice and consent
- Website: U.S. Embassy - Bamako

The United States ambassador to Mali is the official representative of the government of the United States to the government of Mali.

== Ambassadors ==
- Thomas Kenneth Wright (1960-1961)
- William Jules Handley (1961-1964)
- Charles Robert Moore (1965-1968)
- Gilbert Edward Clark (1968-1970)
- Robert O. Blake – Career FSO
  - Appointed: December 10, 1970
  - Terminated mission: May 20, 1973
- Patricia M. Byrne – Career FSO
  - Appointed: 1976
  - Terminated mission: 1979
- Anne Forrester – Career FSO
  - Appointed: 1979
  - Terminated mission: 1981
- Parker W. Borg – Career FSO
  - Appointed: 1981
  - Terminated mission: 1984
- Robert Joseph Ryan (1984-1987)
- Robert Maxwell Pringle (1987-1990)
- Herbert Donald Gelber (1990-1993)
- William H. Dameron (1993-1995)
- David P. Rawson (1996-1999)
- Michael Edward Ranneberger (1999-2002)
- Vicki J. Huddleston (2002-2005)
- Terence Patrick McCulley (2005-2008)
- Gillian Milovanovic – Career FSO
  - Appointed: September 26, 2008
  - Terminated mission: June 1, 2011
- Mary Beth Leonard – Career FSO
  - Appointed: November 7, 2011
  - Terminated mission: September 22, 2014
- Paul Folmsbee – Career FSO
  - Appointed: May 23, 2015
  - Terminated mission: January 2, 2019
- Dennis B. Hankins – Career FSO
  - Appointed: March 15, 2019
  - Terminated mission: September 26, 2022
- Rachna Korhonen – Career FSO
  - Appointed: March 16, 2023
  - Terminated mission: September 5, 2026

== See also ==
- Mali - United States relations
- Foreign relations of Mali
- Ambassadors of the United States
