= Arthur Hummel =

Arthur Hummel may refer to:

- Arthur W. Hummel Sr. (1884–1975), Christian missionary to China and Sinologist
- Arthur W. Hummel Jr. (1920–2001), American diplomat, ambassador to China, and son of Arthur W. Hummel, Sr.
