= Daniel O'Donohue =

Daniel O'Donohue may refer to:

- Daniel Anthony O'Donohue (1931–2019), United States Ambassador to Burma
- Daniel J. O'Donohue, U.S. Marine lieutenant general
- Daniel John O'Donoghue (1844–1907), Canadian politician
