= Liu Wen-cheng =

Taiwanese singer and actor (born 1952)

- Born: 12 November 1952 (age 73); Taipei, Taiwan
- Occupations: Singer, actor
- Years active: 1975–1983; 1986–1991

Chinese name
- Traditional Chinese: 劉文正
- Simplified Chinese: 刘文正
Transcriptions
Standard Mandarin
- Hanyu Pinyin: Liú Wénzhèng
Yue: Cantonese
- Jyutping: lau4 man4 zing3
- Musical career
- Also known as: Steven Liu; Bobby Liu; Liu Wenzheng
- Genres: Mandopop
- Instrument: Vocals
- Labels: Kolin; Tony; PolyGram

Liu Wen-cheng (Chinese: 劉文正; pinyin: Liú Wénzhèng; 12 November 1952) is a Taiwanese singer and actor. He is the nephew of Burton Levin, an American diplomat serving as the United States Ambassador to Burma in the late 1980s and early 90s.

== Early life ==
Liu was the youngest son of a well-to-do family and a favorite of his mother. He had initially planned to follow the path of his siblings, a brother and two sisters, to further his education overseas after college. However, this was shelved after he won the singing contest which led to a contract with Taiwan Television (TTV) at the age of 17.

Liu first started performing with his band "Zhengwu" in Xu Hui Zhong Xue, a Catholic school he attended. According to Liu, his interest in music was encouraged by a priest who was a fan of pop music there.

== Career ==
Liu's first album Nuoyan (The Promise), released in 1975, launched his singing career when it became an instant hit. Liu's path to super-stardom was smooth, due to his distinctive vocal styles and good looks. Early in his career, he often wore a white scarf when performing and this evolved into his signature look.

He won the prestigious Golden Bell Award for Best Male Singer three times, in the year 1980, 82 and 83. At the height of his career, Liu commanded an appearance fee of NT$240,000 per night. He released close to 40 albums and acted in over 20 movies, in which he co-starred with some of the most popular female actresses like Brigitte Lin, Shirley Lu and Sylvia Chang.

In 1983, the then 30-year-old Liu announced unexpectedly that he would give up the limelight and focus on developing his career backstage. In numerous interviews, Liu explained that he could see no further breakthroughs and wished to retire at the peak of his career. He wanted to expand his horizons and not limit a lifetime to entertainment business.

He subsequently set up a production company "Fei Ying" to groom young talents but the company was wound up in 1991 when he immigrated to the United States.

In 1991, he consented to a rare phone interview with a Singapore radio station during which the usually private Liu talked briefly about his personal life. He described his childhood as happy and himself as an easy going and optimistic child who was quite oblivious to his future career as a singer as he had no interest in music till he was in high school. As to why he remained unmarried, Liu attributed it to his independent character and a reluctance to settle down. He felt that a long-term relationship required a level of commitment and responsibility that were difficult to maintain in the entertainment industry. Despite his then 30 odd years, he felt that he had yet to achieve a level of maturity necessary to play the role of a husband and father. Asked if it was due to the fact that he loved himself so well that he did not require love from another, he laughingly replied, "It appears to be a little problem there".

Though Liu was known for his glamorous image, he revealed that the glittering outfits and flashy stage performances were part of the deliverables as a celebrity. After retiring from show biz, he confessed to a preference for comfortable and simple clothes. His taste for food was also undemanding and was happy with a bowl of Zha Jiang Mien and dumplings. His first love was travel, especially to big, modern cities that offer arts and culture like New York and Tokyo. He once said that he didn't like staying in hotels when he was travelling and his dream was to have a "small apartment in every city I love".

Despite his superstar status, Liu maintained an impeccable reputation in the entertainment industry. Insiders described him as gentlemanly, quiet and reserved off stage. Liu resided in New York City. He was said to be a savvy property investor with assets spanning many countries. He had no plans to return to show business.

== Personal life ==
In 2006, Chen Danqing mentioned in a magazine interview that Liu was gay. Chinese-American artist Alan Chow, who had introduced Chen to Liu in the 1980s New York, later wrote in his memoir that Chen's interview "led to Wen-cheng's unforgiveness of me." Chow also wrote that Liu had lived with singer Fei Xiang on Twelfth Street in Manhattan, New York, and that "From a certain perspective, Liu Wen-cheng was driven away by the entire Taiwan. Taiwan is so small, and he was so famous that all eyes were on him. Society dictated when he should make friends, marry, and have children. If he were living in today's Taiwan, things would likely be much better."

On 15 February 2023, it was widely reported that Liu's good friend and agent Hsia Yu-shun had announced Liu had died in November 2022 due to a heart attack. While an unnamed friend of Liu refuted his death, Hsia confirmed Liu’s death to the Taiwanese media. On 16 February, Hsia confessed that Liu is still alive and was instructed by Liu to fake his death to turn down requests for performances. Liu's aunt Lily Lee Levin confirmed Liu is still alive after speaking to him and Liu is residing in the Philippines.
