= Edwin Sheldon Whitehouse =

American diplomat (1883-1965)

Sheldon Whitehouse

U.S. Minister to Colombia
- In office December 6, 1933 – December 8, 1934
- President: Franklin Roosevelt
- Preceded by: Jefferson Caffery
- Succeeded by: William Dawson

U.S. Minister to Guatemala
- In office March 21, 1930 – July 23, 1933
- President: Herbert Hoover
- Preceded by: Arthur H. Geissler
- Succeeded by: Matthew E. Hanna

Personal details
- Born: Edwin Sheldon Whitehouse; February 5, 1883 New York City, New York, U.S.
- Died: August 5, 1965 (aged 82) Newport, Rhode Island, U.S.
- Spouse: Mary Crocker Alexander (m. 1920)
- Relations: Whitehouse family
- Children: 3, including Charles
- Education: Eton College
- Alma mater: Yale University
- Occupation: Diplomat

Edwin Sheldon Whitehouse (February 5, 1883 – August 5, 1965) was an American diplomat who served as the U.S. Minister to Guatemala and U.S. Minister to Colombia.

== Early life ==
Whitehouse was born on February 5, 1883, in New York City. He was one of five children born to William Fitzhugh Whitehouse (1842–1909), a New York lawyer, and Frances Sheldon (1852–1944), the niece of William B. Ogden, the first Mayor of Chicago. His brothers included Norman Ogden Whitehouse, Henry John Whitehouse and William Fitzhugh Whitehouse Jr. His sister, Lily Whitehouse, was married to the Hon. Charles Coventry, a British Army officer who was the second son of George Coventry, 9th Earl of Coventry. Their son, and Whitehouse's nephew, was Francis Henry Coventry, 12th Earl of Coventry. Another sister was Frances Whitehouse, who married Baron Constantine Ramsay of Russia, a gentleman-in-waiting to Czar Nicholas II of Russia, in 1903.

His paternal grandparents were Henry John Whitehouse, the 2nd Episcopal Bishop of Illinois, and Evelina Harriet (née Bruen).

Whitehouse was educated at Eton College, an English boarding school for boys in Eton, near Windsor. He graduated from Yale University in 1905.

== Career ==
In 1908, Whitehouse entered the diplomatic service as a secretary to Whitelaw Reid, then the U.S. Ambassador to the United Kingdom. From 1909 until 1911, he served as secretary to the American legation in Caracas, Venezuela.

In 1911, he was appointed second secretary in Paris, France, followed by service in Madrid, Athens, Stockholm and Saint Petersburg, Russia. In fact, Whitehouse acquired the touring car in which Alexander Kerensky fled St. Petersburg after he was overthrown as the head of the Russian Provisional Government in 1917 during the October Revolution.

In 1919, Whitehouse was a part of the American Commission to Negotiate Peace at Paris. From 1920 to 1921, he was chief of the Near Eastern division of the U.S. State Department. In the late 1920s, he was chargé d'affaires at the American embassy in Paris. While in this role, in 1927, he officially presented James J. Walker, then Mayor of New York City, who later accused Whitehouse of hiring spies to "get something" on the mayor. This was disproved when the Paris police stated that they assigned two plainclothes policemen to protect the mayor as he was a distinguished visitor.

=== Minister to Guatemala and Colombia ===
On December 16, 1929, he was appointed by Herbert Hoover as the U.S. Minister to Guatemala. He presented his credentials on March 21, 1930, succeeding Arthur H. Geissler. He served in this role until July 23, 1933, when he was succeeded by Matthew E. Hanna.

On July 15, 1933, he was appointed by President Franklin D. Roosevelt to replace Jefferson Caffery as the U.S. Minister to Colombia. He presented his credentials on December 6, 1933, and served until he left his post on December 8, 1934, when he was succeeded by William Dawson.

=== Later life ===
In 1940 during World War II, Whitehouse flew to Europe to bring home his mother, who was then 88 years old, and who had been living in Paris at 48 Avenue Henri-Martin, for 20 years. She managed to travel through wartime Europe to Lisbon, Portugal, and flew home on the Dixie Clipper as what was said to be the oldest woman ever to make the trip by air.

Whitehouse was a member of the Knickerbocker Club, the Brook Club, the Huguenot Society, and the Sons of the Revolution.

In 1952, his wife Mary, along with Helen Rogers Reid (the wife of Ogden Mills Reid) and Mary Cushing Astor (the wife of Vincent Astor), became the first women elected trustees of the Metropolitan Museum of Art.

== Personal life ==
In October 1920, Whitehouse was married to Mary Crocker Alexander (1895–1986), the daughter of Charles Beatty Alexander and Harriet (née Crocker) Alexander. Mary was the granddaughter of railroad executive Charles Crocker. Mary's sister, Harriet Alexander, was married to Winthrop W. Aldrich, who was the CEO of Chase Bank and the U.S. Ambassador to the United Kingdom.

The Whitehouses had a home in Newport, Rhode Island, built by his father and known as "Eastbourne Lodge", an apartment at 1040 Fifth Avenue on the Upper East Side of New York City, and a large estate outside Tallahassee, Florida. Together, they were the parents of:

- Charles Sheldon Whitehouse (1921–2001), the United States Ambassador to Laos and Thailand who was married to Molly Rand. After their divorce, he married Janet Ketchum Grayson.
- George Bruen Whitehouse (1923–1944), who was killed in action in the Pacific theatre during World War II.
- Sylvia Whitehouse, who in 1956 married Robert Orris Blake (1921–2015), the U.S. Ambassador to Mali.

Whitehouse died at the Newport Hospital in Newport, Rhode Island, on August 5, 1965. He was buried in St. Mary's Episcopal Churchyard in Portsmouth, Rhode Island.

=== Descendants ===
Through his son Charles, he was the grandfather of Sheldon Whitehouse (b. 1955), the U.S. Senator from Rhode Island, Charles Whitehouse, and Sarah Whitehouse Atkins.

Through his daughter Sylvia, he was the grandfather of George Blake, Lucy Blake, and Robert O. Blake, Jr. (b. 1957), a career diplomat and the former U.S. Ambassador to Indonesia. He formerly served as the Assistant Secretary of State for South and Central Asian Affairs from 2009 to 2013 and U.S. Ambassador to Sri Lanka and the Maldives from 2006 to 2009.

Diplomatic posts
Preceded by Arthur H. Geissler	U.S. Minister to Guatemala; 1930–1933	Succeeded by Matthew E. Hanna
Preceded by Jefferson Caffery	U.S. Minister to Colombia; 1933–1934	Succeeded by William Dawson
