= William Kintner =

American soldier, foreign policy analyst and diplomat

William Roscoe Kintner (21 April 1915 – 1 February 1997) was an American soldier, foreign policy analyst, and diplomat.

Kintner was born in Lock Haven, Pennsylvania to Joseph and Florence Kintner, the eighth of nine children. He was appointed to the United States Military Academy in 1936, and was commissioned a second lieutenant upon graduating in 1940. A career Army officer, he landed at Omaha Beach for Operation Overlord during the invasion of Normandy in 1944. He served during the Korean War as an infantry battalion commander during the Battle of Pork Chop Hill. He retired from the U.S. Army as a colonel in 1961, having earned the Bronze Star Medal and Legion of Merit, both with oak leaf clusters.

While in the service, he earned an M.A. and Ph.D. from Georgetown University in 1948. His doctoral dissertation, a study of the Communist Party of the Soviet Union, was published in 1950 as The Front is Everywhere. Upon retiring from the Army, he taught political science at the University of Pennsylvania, where he remained as professor until 1985. He was deputy director of the Foreign Policy Research Institute until 1969, when he became director. In 1973, President Gerald Ford appointed him U.S. Ambassador to Thailand, a post in which he served from 1973 to 1975. After his diplomatic stint, he returned to Philadelphia in 1975 to serve as president as FPRI and as editor of its journal, Orbis. In that capacity he initiated a joint project with Soviet Institute for the Study of the United States in Canada which permitted the yearly exchange of top non-governmental scholars despite strained Cold War diplomatic relations.

In 1986, President Ronald Reagan appointed him to the board of directors of the United States Institute of Peace.

Kintner was a prolific author, writing on foreign policy, arms control, and strategic planning until his death in 1997 of cancer at the age of 81. He is interred at Bryn Athyn Cemetery in Bryn Athyn, Pennsylvania.

== Personal life ==
Kintner married Xandree Hyatt in 1940, and the couple had three daughters and a son. Widowed in 1986, he married Faith Child Halterman in 1987.

== Works ==
Articles

- "The Orchestration of Crisis." Esquire, May 1959, pp. 59–63.

Books

- The Front Is Everywhere: Militant Communism in Action. Norman: University of Oklahoma Press, 1950. ISBN 978-0819140111.
- Atomic Weapons in Land Combat, with Colonel G.C. Reinhardt (1953)
- Forging a New Sword, a Study of the Department of Defense with Joseph Coffey and Raymond Albright (1958)
- Protracted Conflict: A Challenging Study of Communist Strategy, with James E. Dougherty, Alvin J. Cottrell, and Robert Strausz-Hupé (1959)
- A Forward Strategy for America, sequel to Protracted Conflict, with Stefan T. Possony and Robert Strausz-Hupé (1961)
- The New Frontier of War: Political Warfare, Present and Future (1962) ISBN 978-1258422158.
- Building the Atlantic World (1963)
- Peace and the Strategy Conflict (1967)
- The Nuclear Revolution in Soviet Military Affairs (1968) ISBN 978-0806107721
- Safeguard: Why the ABM Makes Sense (1969)
- The Prudent Case for Safeguard (1969)
- The Uncertain Strategic Balance in the 1970's (1969)
- Eastern Europe and European Security (1971) ISBN 978-0842400121
- Soviet Military Trends: Implications for U.S. Security, with Robert L. Pfaltzgraff (1971) ISBN 9780844710525
- National Strategy in a Decade of Change: An Emerging United States Policy, with Richard Foster (1973) ISBN 9780669904802
- SALT: Implications for Arms Control in the 1970s (1973) ISBN 978-0822984412
- Technology and International Politics: the Crisis of Wishing (1975) ISBN 9780669942682
- A Matter of Two Chinas: the China-Taiwan Issue in U.S. Foreign Policy, with John Franklin Copper (1979)
- Soviet Global Strategy (1987) ISBN 9780915979202
- Arms Control: the American Dilemma (1987) ISBN 0-88702-026-7
- The Role of Ancient Israel "Written with the Finger of God": A Swedenborgian Perspective of the History of the Israelites From Abraham to Jesus (1996) ISBN 978-0533117406

Diplomatic posts
| Preceded by Leonard S. Unger | United States Ambassador to Thailand; 1973–1975 | Succeeded by Charles S. Whitehouse |
