= Maurice Darrow Bean =

American diplomat (1928–2009)

Maurice Darrow Bean (September 9, 1928 – November 30, 2009) of California was an American diplomat who served as United States Ambassador to Burma from September 1977 to August 1979, the first African-American ambassador to serve in Southeast Asia. Prior to his appointment, Bean worked for the Peace Corps for 15 years, including as Operations Director in the Philippines.

== Biography ==
Bean was born on September 9, 1928, in Gary, Indiana. He graduated from Howard University in 1950 with a B.A. in government and entered the Foreign Service in 1951. He attended Haverford College, graduating in 1954 with a master's degree in social and technical assistance. In 1959, he received a postgraduate certificate in Advanced International Studies from Johns Hopkins University.

Bean joined the U.S. Peace Corps in 1961, working in Manila, the Philippines, until 1966. Between 1966 and 1970, he worked with the U.S. State Department as a director in the Bureau of East Asian and Pacific Affairs for Malaysia and Singapore. From 1971 to 1973, he served as U.S. Consul in Ibadan, Nigeria, and subsequently worked in Monrovia, Liberia.

Bean was nominated by President Jimmy Carter as U.S. Ambassador to Burma, becoming the first African-American ambassador to serve in Southeast Asia.

Diplomatic posts
Preceded by David L. Osborn	U.S. Ambassador to Burma; 1977–1979	Succeeded by Patricia M. Byrne
