= Edwin W. Martin =

American diplomat (1917-1991)

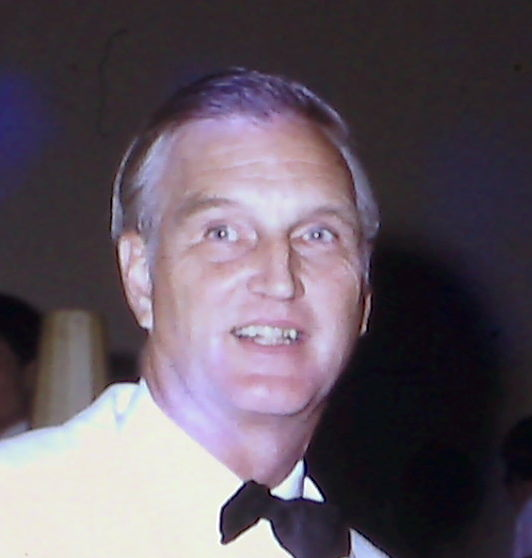
Ambassador Martin at the Marine Corps Birthday Ball, Rangoon, Burma, November 1972

Edwin Webb Martin (August 31, 1917 – October 5, 1991) was an American diplomat and foreign policy scholar. He served as U.S. Ambassador to Burma from 1971 to 1973.

== Life ==
Martin was born in Madurai, India, to American missionary parents. He went to school in India, before continuing his education at Deerfield Academy. He graduated with a B.A. from Oberlin College in 1939, and an M.A. from The Fletcher School of Law and Diplomacy at Tufts University in 1940.

Then, he embarked upon a career in the U.S. Foreign Service, serving as a vice consul in Bermuda (1941–44) and Belgian Congo (1944). After military service during World War II and Chinese language training at Yale University, he was dispatched to China during the Civil War in that country (1946–49). After the Republic of China retreat to Taiwan, Martin was the U.S consul at Taipei (1949–50). During the 1950s, he participated in the Korean truce talks at Panmunjom and bilateral talks with the Chinese communists in Geneva. Stations as first secretary at the U.S. Embassy in London (1956–58) and director of the State Department's Office of Chinese Affairs (1958–1961) followed.

He then served as political adviser to Admiral Harry D. Felt at the United States Pacific Command in Honolulu. Martin continued as deputy chief of mission in Ankara (1964–67) and consul general in Hong Kong (1967–70). He topped his diplomatic career as Ambassador to Burma from October 1971 to November 1973.

After retiring from the foreign service, Martin taught for five years at Hiram College, Ohio, then returned to Washington, where he authored books on foreign policy and historical topics. He died in Georgetown University Hospital, Washington, D.C., following surgery for an aortic aneurysm.

== Publications ==
- Southeast Asia and China: The End of Containment. Westview Press. 1977.
- Divided Counsel: The Anglo-American Response to Communist Victory in China. University Press of Kentucky. 1986.
- The Hubbards of Sivas: A Chronicle of Love and Faith. Fithian Press. 1991.

Diplomatic posts
Preceded by Edward E. Rice	U.S. Consul General at Hong Kong and Macau; 1967–1970	Succeeded by David L. Osborn
Preceded by Arthur W. Hummel, Jr.	U.S. Ambassador to Burma; 1971–1973	Succeeded by David L. Osborn
