= Jefferson Caffery =

American diplomat (1886–1974)

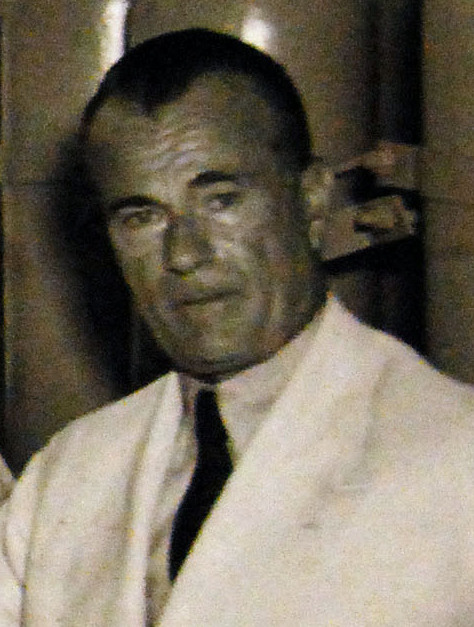
- Cafferty in 1943

United States Ambassador to Egypt
- In office September 29, 1949 – January 11, 1955
- President: Harry S. Truman; Dwight D. Eisenhower
- Preceded by: Stanton Griffis
- Succeeded by: Henry A. Byroade

United States Ambassador to France
- In office December 30, 1944 – May 13, 1949
- President: Franklin D. Roosevelt; Harry S. Truman
- Preceded by: Somerville Pinkney Tuck (Acting)
- Succeeded by: David K. E. Bruce

United States Ambassador to Brazil
- In office August 17, 1937 – September 17, 1944
- President: Franklin D. Roosevelt
- Preceded by: Hugh S. Gibson
- Succeeded by: Adolf A. Berle, Jr.

United States Ambassador to Cuba
- In office February 28, 1934 – March 9, 1937
- President: Franklin D. Roosevelt
- Preceded by: Sumner Welles
- Succeeded by: J. Butler Wright

United States Assistant Secretary of State
- In office July 12, 1933 – December 4, 1933
- President: Franklin D. Roosevelt

United States Ambassador to Colombia
- In office November 28, 1928 – May 20, 1933
- President: Calvin Coolidge; Herbert Hoover; Franklin D. Roosevelt
- Preceded by: Samuel H. Piles
- Succeeded by: Sheldon Whitehouse

United States Ambassador to El Salvador
- In office July 20, 1926 – July 22, 1928
- President: Calvin Coolidge
- Preceded by: Montgomery Schuyler, Jr.
- Succeeded by: Warren Delano Robbins

Personal details
- Born: December 1, 1886 Lafayette, Louisiana, U.S.
- Died: April 13, 1974 (aged 87) Lafayette, Louisiana, U.S.
- Spouse: Gertrude McCarthy (m. 1937; died 1973)
- Relations: Donelson Caffery (cousin); Patrick T. Caffery (cousin)
- Education: Southwestern Louisiana Industrial Institute; Tulane University
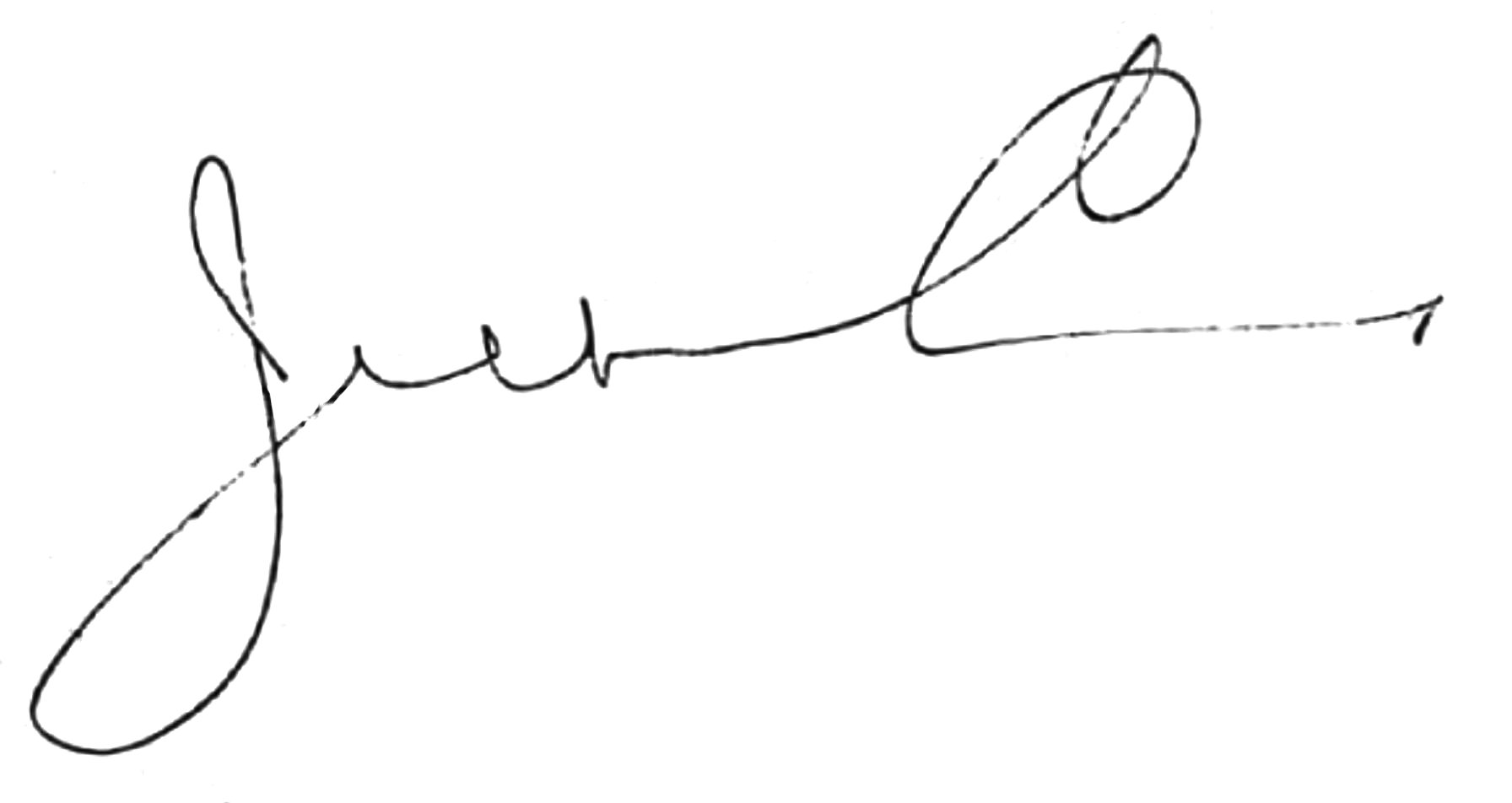
- Signature

Jefferson Caffery (December 1, 1886 – April 13, 1974) was an American diplomat. He served as U.S. Ambassador to El Salvador (1926–1928), Colombia (1928–1933), Cuba (1934–1937), Brazil (1937–1944), France (1944–1949), and Egypt (1949–1955).

== Early life ==
Caffery was born in Lafayette, Louisiana, to Charles Duval Caffery and Mary Catherine (née Parkerson) Caffery. He was privately educated in primary and secondary school. He was a member of the first class of Southwestern Louisiana Industrial Institute, which later became the University of Louisiana at Lafayette. He also graduated with a bachelor's degree from Tulane University in 1906.

After graduation, he returned to Lafayette to teach at the Industrial Institute, including serving as its head football coach for at least one game, an 11–5 victory over Crowley in 1907. He was admitted to the Louisiana bar in 1909.

Caffery was a cousin of U.S. Senator Donelson Caffery and U.S. Representative Patrick T. Caffery.

== Career ==
Caffery launched his career of international diplomacy in 1911 when he entered the Foreign Service as second secretary of the legation in Caracas in 1911 during the William Howard Taft administration.

He traveled to Iran (then named Persia) in 1916, to Paris after World War I with President Wilson’s peacemakers, then to Washington, D.C., to arrange details for visits by the King of Belgium and the Prince of Wales. In 1920, he was named second-in-command at the U.S. Embassy in Madrid. In 1933, Caffery briefly served as assistant secretary of state under Cordell Hull.

Throughout his career he also worked in low ranking diplomatic posts in Belgium, Germany, Greece, Japan, Persia, Sweden, and Venezuela.

=== Service in Colombia ===
As the U.S. ambassador to Colombia, Jefferson was heavily involved in the Banana Massacre that occurred in 1928 in the small, coastal town of Ciénaga. Tired of terrible working conditions and very little wages (workers were paid in United Fruit Company store credit), banana farmers went on strike in protest. In order to protect the interests of the United Fruit Company, Caffery reported to U.S. Secretary of State Frank Billings Kellogg that leaders of the strike would be immediately arrested and sent to prison in nearby Cartagena. Martial law was declared soon after and an unknown number of workers and their families were shot by a firing squad in the town square. On December 29, 1928, he wrote a dispatch from the U.S. Embassy in Bogotá to the U.S. Secretary of State stating, "I have the honor to report that the legal advisor of the United Fruit Company here in Bogotá stated yesterday that the total number of strikers killed by the Colombian military authorities exceeded one thousand; while the number of soldiers killed was one."

=== Service in Cuba ===
In 1934, while ambassador to Cuba, four assailants attempted to assassinate Caffery in front of his home in Havana. The assailants waited outside of his residence for his daily departure to his yacht club. One assailant was killed by a bodyguard, the others escaped. Caffery was not injured. The event was reported on the front page of the New Orleans Times Picayune on May 28, 1934.

=== Service in Brazil ===
While ambassador to Brazil, Caffery took part in the Potenji River Conference, also known as the Natal Conference. The conference was a meeting that took place on January 28 and 29, 1943 between the President of Brazil, Getúlio Vargas and the President of the United States, Franklin Delano Roosevelt, that occurred during the return of President Roosevelt from the Casablanca Conference to the USA. The Potenji River Conference involved discussions of the ongoing support and role of Brazil in World War II and took place aboard the USS Humboldt in the Potenji River harbor in Natal, Rio Grande do Norte and defined the agreements that led to the creation of the Brazilian Expeditionary Force.

=== Service in Egypt ===
During Caffery's tenure, the 1952 Egyptian revolution occurred, which led to the abdication of King Farouk. The revolution was led by a military junta headed by Mohammed Naguib and Gamal Abdel Nasser who demanded the departure of the British from the Suez Canal zone. According to CIA agent Miles Copeland Jr., Caffery sent former OSS propagandist Paul Linebarger to advise the Egyptians in propaganda.

Caffery served as intermediary between the Egyptian and British Governments in the negotiations, and his "long experience in diplomacy, together with the respect in which he was held by the Egyptian Government, enabled him to arrange for the gradual departure of the British." In 1954, the British agreed to evacuate their military bases in the Canal Zone until the summer of 1956, but were given the right to return in case of an attack by an outside power against an Arab League member state or Turkey.

During his tenure as Ambassador to Egypt, Caffery prioritized Anglo-Egyptian negotiations over the Suez Canal base amidst rising Cold War tensions. To secure Egyptian cooperation and prevent the spread of Soviet influence in the region, Caffery advocated for British concessions regarding the governance and future independence of Sudan. He said to his British counterpart "I do not understand why anybody should be bothered about the fate of ten million niggers."

In total, he worked 43 years in foreign service under eight U.S. presidents: Taft, Wilson, Harding, Coolidge, Hoover, Roosevelt, Truman, and Eisenhower.

== Personal life ==
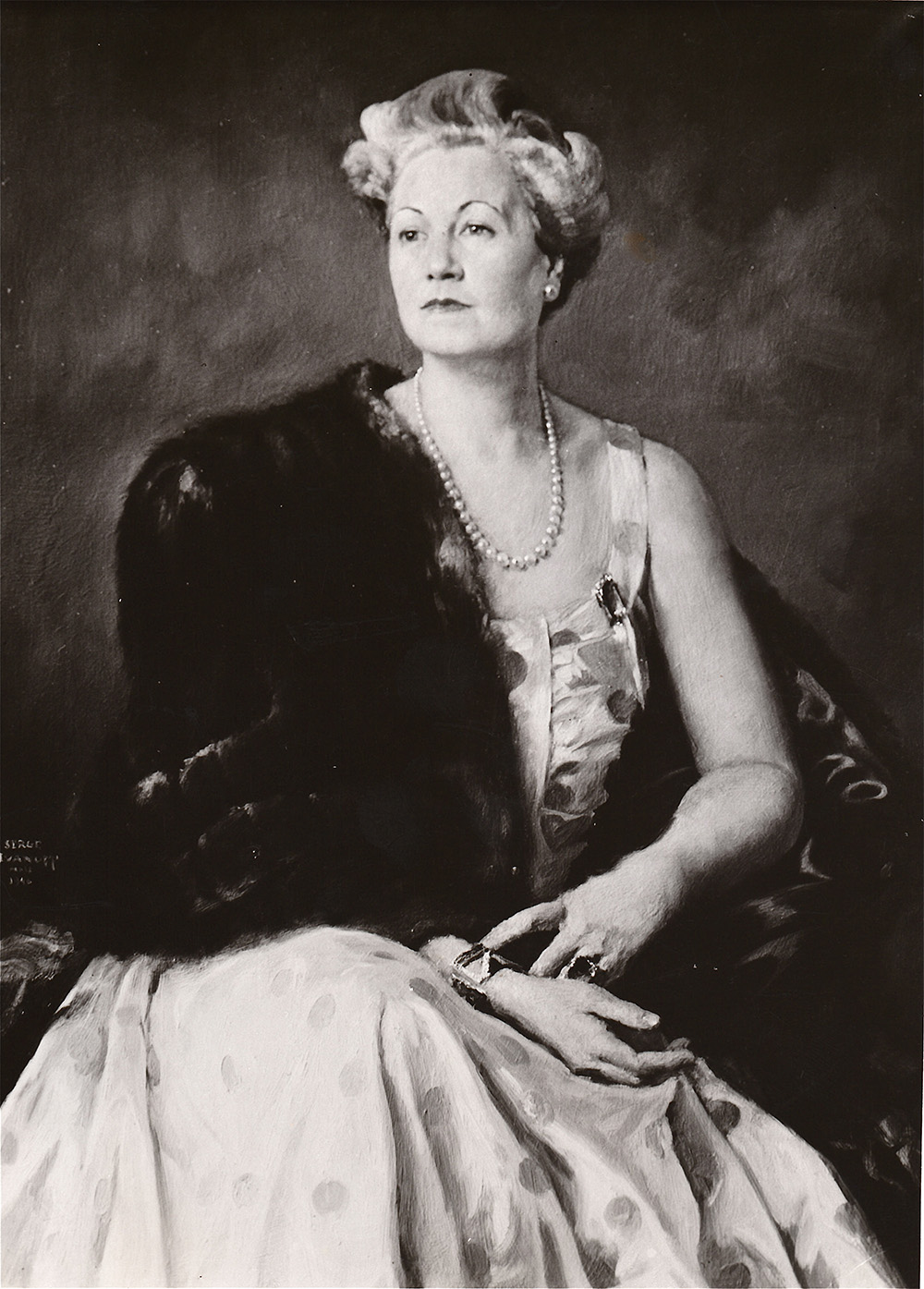
Portrait of Mrs. Jefferson Caffery by Serge Ivanoff, Paris, 1946.

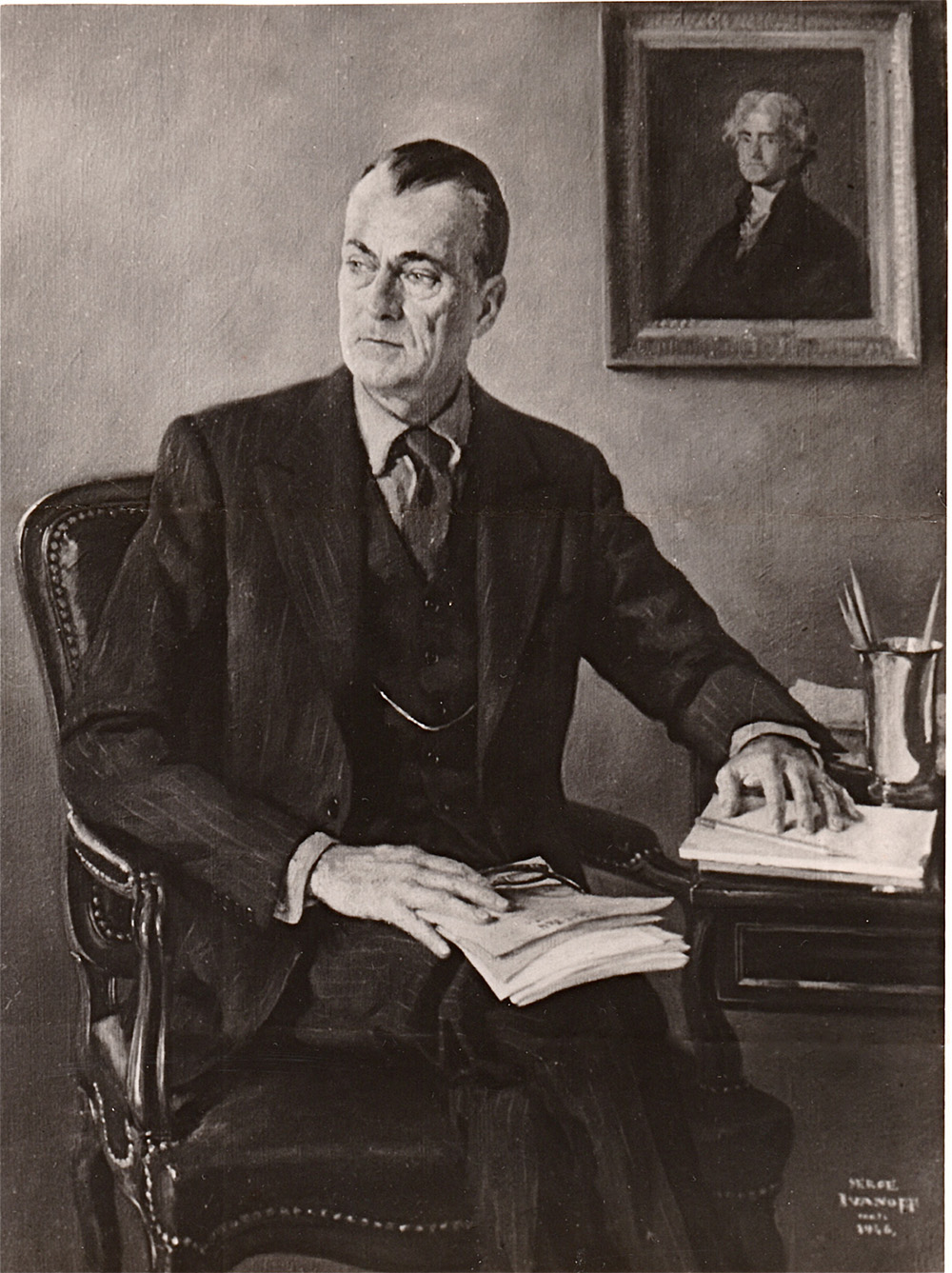
Portrait of Jefferson Caffery by Serge Ivanoff, Paris, 1946.

On November 20, 1937, Caffery, then 41 years old, married Gertrude McCarthy of Evansville, Indiana, while in Rio de Janeiro. They had no children.

He retired with his wife in 1955 to reside in Rome, where he was an honorary Papal gentleman to Popes Pius XII, John XXIII, and Paul VI. He returned to Lafayette, Louisiana in 1973, shortly before Mrs. Caffery's death on July 13, 1973. Caffery himself died on April 14, 1974. The Cafferys are buried in the cemetery behind St. John's Cathedral in Lafayette.

== Honors and awards ==
He was awarded the Foreign Service Cup in 1971 by his fellow Foreign Service officers. He held several honorary degrees and decorations, including the Laetare Medal from the University of Notre Dame in South Bend, Indiana, in 1954. He received the Grand Cross of the Legion of Honour from the president of France in 1949 and the Order of the Cordon of the Republic from the president of Egypt in 1955.

Ambassador Caffery was also bestowed a knighthood in the Sovereign Military Order of Malta (SMOM) by the Grand Master of that Order, for his outstanding service to the Catholic Church.

A portion of Louisiana Highway 3073 in Lafayette is named the "Ambassador Caffery Parkway" in his memory. In 2000, Caffery was inducted into the Louisiana Political Museum and Hall of Fame in Winnfield.

== Head coaching record ==
Year	Team	Overall	Conference	Standing	Bowl/playoffs
Southwestern Louisiana Industrial (Independent) (1907)
1907	Southwestern Louisiana Industrial	1–0			
Southwestern Louisiana Industrial:		1–0			
Total:		1–0			

Diplomatic posts
Preceded by Montgomery Schuyler, Jr.	U.S. Minister to El Salvador; 20 July 1926–22 July 1928	Succeeded by Warren D. Robbins
Preceded by Samuel H. Piles	United States Minister to Colombia; 28 November 1928–20 May 1933	Succeeded by Sheldon Whitehouse
Preceded by Sumner Welles	United States Ambassador to Cuba; 1934–1937	Succeeded by J. Butler Wright
Preceded by Hugh S. Gibson	United States Ambassador to Brazil; 17 August 1937–17 September 1944	Succeeded by Adolf A. Berle, Jr.
Preceded by William D. Leahy (to 1942)	United States Ambassador to France; 1944–1949	Succeeded by David K. E. Bruce
Preceded by Stanton Griffis	United States Ambassador to Egypt; 1949–1955	Succeeded by Henry A. Byroade
