= David L. Osborn =

American diplomat

David Lawrence Osborn (January 11, 1921 – September 16, 1994) of Tennessee served as Consul General of the United States of America Hong Kong and Macau from August 1970 to March 1974, and as United States Ambassador to Burma from March 1974 to July 1977, immediately following Edwin W. Martin in both positions.

He received a B.A. from Southwestern University at Memphis in 1940, and an M.A. from Harvard University in 1947.

Diplomatic posts
Preceded by Edwin W. Martin	Consul General of the United States of America Hong Kong and Macau; 1970–1974	Succeeded by Charles T. Cross
Preceded by Edwin W. Martin	U.S. Ambassador to Burma; 1974–1977	Succeeded by Maurice Darrow Bean
