= Robert Maxwell Pringle =

American diplomat

Robert Maxwell Pringle (born November 12, 1936, in New York City) was the American Ambassador to Mali from November 6, 1987, until September 17, 1990.

== Early life ==
Of Scottish heritage, the first Pringle to come to the United States emigrated in the eighteenth century. Pringle's paternal grandfather, James Maxwell Pringle, was from Charleston, South Carolina. His father, Henry F. Pringle, was a journalist. When he was young, the family moved to Washington, D.C., where he grew up. Initially they lived on Argonne Place near Sixteenth Street and Columbia Road in Adams Morgan. His parents eventually divorced and his mother sent him to Le Rosey for one year. When he returned, he attended the Georgetown Day School. Eventually, he attended Harvard College as a history major who spent most of his time working at The Harvard Crimson, graduating in 1958.

Diplomatic posts
Preceded by Robert Joseph Ryan	United States Ambassador to Mali; 1987-1990	Succeeded by Herbert Donald Gelber
