= John Scott Everton =

American college president and diplomat (1908–2003)

John Scott Everton (March 7, 1908 – January 23, 2003) was an American college president and diplomat.

He was educated at Colgate University Divinity School, Cambridge, and Yale. He worked on the research staff at the Ford Foundation.

He served as president of Kalamazoo College in 1949–53, and as U.S. Ambassador to Burma in 1961–63. In 1968–71, he was president of Robert College in Istanbul, Turkey, before it was incorporated into Boğaziçi University.

He volunteered his time as an interpreter at the Cape Cod Museum of Natural History in the early 1990s.

Diplomatic posts
Preceded by William P. Snow	U.S. Ambassador to Burma; 1961–1963	Succeeded by Henry A. Byroade
