= Walter P. McConaughy =

American diplomat (1908–2000)

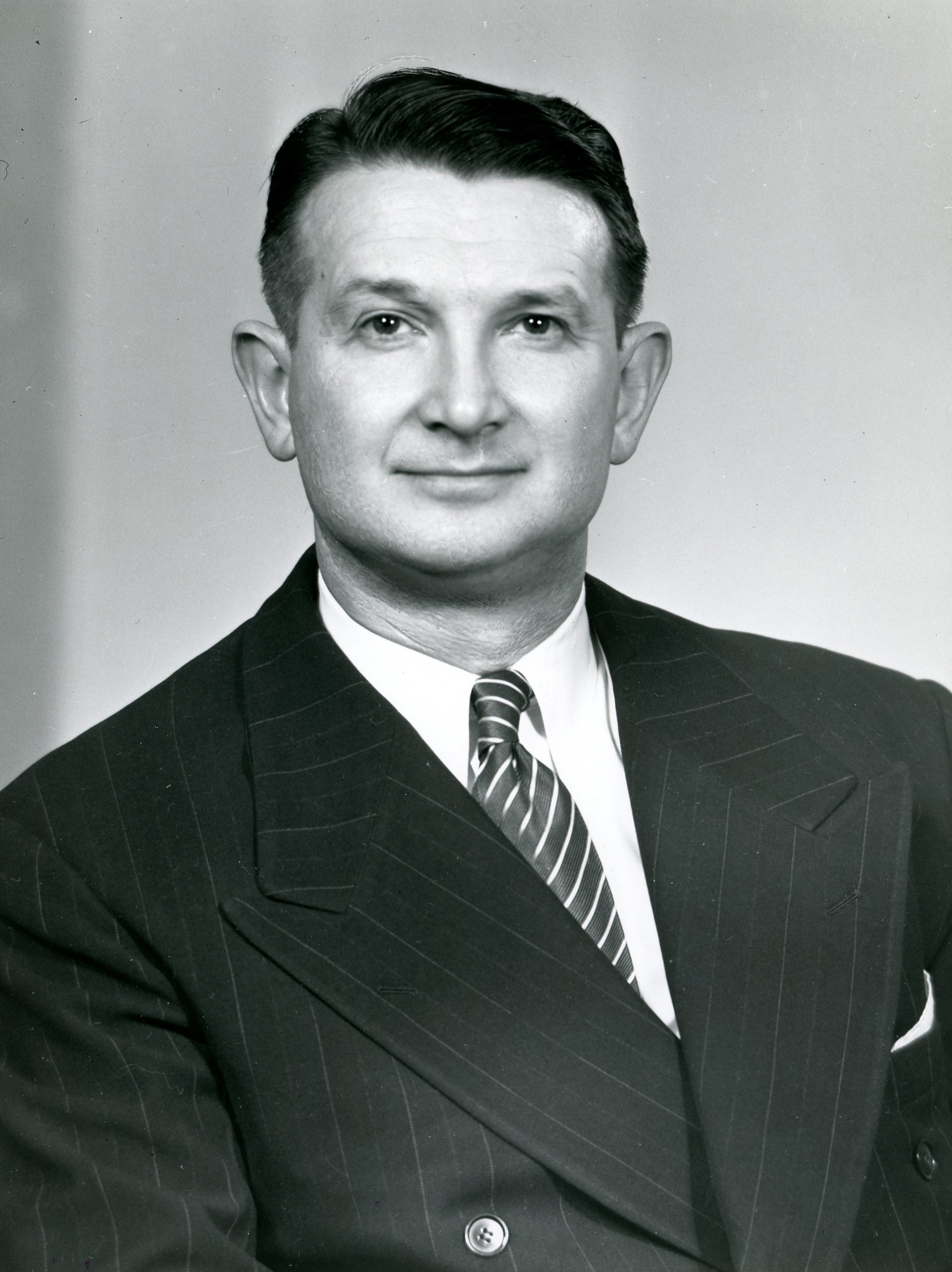
- McConaughy in 1953

United States Ambassador to the Republic of China
- In office June 28, 1966 – April 4, 1974
- President: Lyndon B. Johnson; Richard M. Nixon
- Preceded by: Jerauld Wright
- Succeeded by: Leonard S. Unger

United States Ambassador to Pakistan
- In office March 20, 1962 – May 27, 1966
- President: John F. Kennedy; Lyndon B. Johnson
- Preceded by: William M. Rountree
- Succeeded by: Eugene M. Locke

6th Assistant Secretary of State for Far Eastern Affairs
- In office April 24, 1961 – December 3, 1961
- President: John F. Kennedy
- Preceded by: J. Graham Parsons
- Succeeded by: W. Averell Harriman

5th United States Ambassador to Korea
- In office December 17, 1959 – April 12, 1961
- President: Dwight D. Eisenhower; John F. Kennedy
- Preceded by: Walter C. Dowling
- Succeeded by: Samuel D. Berger

United States Ambassador to Burma
- In office August 20, 1957 – November 2, 1959
- President: Dwight D. Eisenhower
- Preceded by: Joseph C. Satterthwaite
- Succeeded by: William P. Snow

Personal details
- Born: Walter Patrick McConaughy Jr. September 11, 1908 Montevallo, Alabama, U.S.
- Died: November 10, 2000 (aged 92) Atlanta, Georgia, U.S.
- Spouse: Dorothy Davis
- Children: 2
- Education: Birmingham–Southern College; Duke University
- Profession: Diplomat

Walter Patrick McConaughy Jr. (September 11, 1908 – November 10, 2000) was a career American diplomat who served as U.S. Ambassador to a number of countries.

== Education ==
McConaughy attended Birmingham–Southern College and Duke University, graduating in 1930.

== Career ==
McConaughy joined the US State Department after graduation. He first served in Tampico, Mexico and then in 1933 was posted to Kobe, Japan, where he served for seven years with brief spells in Taiwan and Nagasaki. He was transferred to Beiping in 1941. When the Pacific War commenced he was interned and then repatriated. He then served in La Paz, Bolivia as a commercial attaché, and then Rio de Janeiro.

In 1948, was posted to as Consul at the United States Consulate General in Shanghai and was promoted to Consul General in 1949. Following the Communist victory in China, he closed the Shanghai Consulate and moved to Hong Kong. McConaughy's reports from that period show a burning clarity in their analysis of Chinese Communist propaganda and the currents of information available in Hong Kong.

After returning to Washington to serve alongside Edwin M. Martin and O.E. Clubb in the Office of Chinese Affairs, he served as the ambassador to Burma from May 1957 to November 1959. He then accepted an offer to become the ambassador to South Korea, a post he held from 1959 to 1961, later becoming the ambassador to Pakistan from 1962 to 1966 and the ambassador to the Republic of China from 1966 to 1974.

McConaughy died in 2000.

Diplomatic posts
Preceded by Joseph C. Satterthwaite	U.S. Ambassador to Burma; 1957–1959	Succeeded by William P. Snow
Preceded by Walter C. Dowling	U.S. Ambassador to South Korea; 1959–1961	Succeeded by Samuel D. Berger
Preceded by William M. Rountree	U.S. Ambassador to Pakistan; 1962–1966	Succeeded by Eugene Murphy Locke
Preceded by Jerauld Wright	U.S. Ambassador to the Republic of China; 1966–1974	Succeeded by Leonard S. Unger
Government offices
Preceded by J. Graham Parsons	Assistant Secretary of State for Far Eastern Affairs; April 24, 1961 – December 3, 1961	Succeeded by W. Averell Harriman
