= Burton Levin =

American diplomat

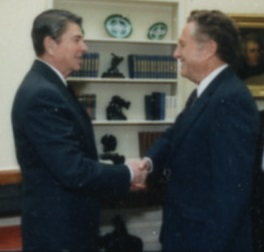
- Right, 1987

United States Ambassador to Burma
- In office April 7, 1987 – September 30, 1990
- Appointed by: Ronald Reagan
- Preceded by: Daniel Anthony O'Donohue
- Succeeded by: Derek Mitchell

Personal details
- Born: September 28, 1930 New York City, New York, U.S.
- Died: October 31, 2016 (aged 86) Sherborn, Massachusetts, U.S.
- Spouse: Lily Lee Levin
- Relatives: Liu Wen-cheng (nephew)
- Education: Brooklyn College (BA); Columbia University (MA)
- No ambassador was appointed to replace Levin. The U.S. was represented by a succession of chargés d’affaires.

Burton Levin (September 28, 1930 – October 31, 2016) was an American diplomat.

== Life ==
He was born in New York City. He earned his BA in 1952 from Brooklyn College, and his MA in International Affairs at Columbia University and went on to work in the Foreign Service. Levin served as Director of Mission in Thailand, Consul General in Hong Kong and was the United States Ambassador to Burma from 1987 to 1990.

Levin was a visiting fellow at the Hoover Institute at Stanford University, and a visiting scholar at Harvard University. After retiring from the Foreign Service, he became the head of the Hong Kong office of The Asia Society.

He also sat on the board of directors for the Mansfield Foundation, the China Fund and the Noble Group.

He died in Massachusetts on October 31, 2016.

Diplomatic posts
Preceded by Daniel Anthony O'Donohue	U.S. Ambassador to Burma; 1987–1990	Succeeded by Franklin Huddle
