= David Floyd Lambertson =

American diplomat (born 1940)

David Floyd Lambertson (born June 30, 1940) of Kansas served as United States ambassador to Thailand from September 1991 until August 1995.

Lambertson entered the U.S. Foreign Service in February 1963. He was assigned to Saigon from 1965 to 1968 as a member of the embassy’s political section, to Medan, Indonesia from 1969 to 1971, and to Paris as a liaison officer and press spokesman for the U.S. Delegation to the Paris Peace Accords, 1971-1973, on ending the Vietnam War.

Lambertson returned to the State Department in Washington in 1973, first to the Office of East Asian Regional Affairs and then, in 1975, to the Office of Japanese Affairs as its deputy director. He was posted to Tokyo in 1977 as deputy chief of the political section, responsible for working with the Japanese Foreign Ministry on U.S.-Japan bilateral issues and cooperative US-Japanese approaches to multilateral questions. In 1980-1981 Lambertson attended the Royal College of Defence Studies in London, after which he returned to Washington as director of the Office of Korean Affairs, 1982-84. He was deputy chief of mission in the U.S. embassies in Canberra, 1984–86, and Seoul, 1986-87.

In 1987 Lambertson was named deputy assistant secretary of state with responsibility for the ten countries of Southeast Asia. His work during his three years in that position focused on negotiations to end the war in Cambodia, support for the newly established democracy in the Philippines, and efforts to achieve the fullest possible accounting for Americans missing in action in Indochina.

During the 1990-91 academic year, Lambertson was diplomat-in-residence at the University of Kansas, teaching in the Political Science department. While at KU he was named by President George H. W. Bush in early 1991 as ambassador to Thailand. He was confirmed by the U.S. Senate in July and arrived in Bangkok in September of that year. As ambassador to Thailand, Lambertson led one of America’s largest embassies (500-plus U.S. employees, 26 USG agencies, and more than 1500 Thai employees). He was responsible for all aspects of U.S. relations with Thailand during a period of significant political upheaval and change, burgeoning growth in US–Thai economic relations, intensified efforts to combat drug production and trafficking, and major refugee and displaced persons issues along Thailand’s borders with Cambodia, Laos and Burma. He also had oversight responsibility for U.S. government activities in Vietnam and Cambodia prior to the end of the Cambodian war and the normalization of relations with Vietnam. Lambertson left Thailand in August 1995 and retired from the Foreign Service shortly thereafter.

During his career, Lambertson was a member of numerous U.S. delegations to international conferences, beginning with the Paris Peace Talks, and including, inter alia, bilateral planning conferences with Japan, Korea and Australia, a United Nations conference on refugees in 1988 in Geneva, the 1989 Paris Conference on Cambodia (in which he led the U.S. delegation), and several conferences of the Association of Southeast Asian Nations. He was a member of the U.S. delegation to the United Nations General Assembly in 1980. Lambertson traveled to Hanoi three times, before normalization, as a member of delegations seeking progress on the POW/MIA issue.

Lambertson had extensive experience in the foreign policy process in Washington, including Oval Office meetings during the Reagan, Bush and Clinton Administrations, chairmanship of inter-agency committees and more than 35 appearances before Congressional committees. He also had considerable media exposure, including appearances on the Today Show, Good Morning America, Nightline and NPR’s Morning Edition. He spoke on aspects of U.S. policy in many forums, including the Council on Foreign Relations in New York, the John F. Kennedy School of Government at Harvard University, the Asia Society in New York and Washington, the Aspen Institute and numerous business organizations nationwide.

During his Foreign Service career, Lambertson earned the State Department’s Meritorious, Superior and Distinguished Honor Awards as well as several Presidential awards.

From 1996 through 1998, Lambertson was director of international development at KU, organizing business seminars and doing outreach for the university. Lambertson has taught in the Honors Program at KU and the graduate-level International Studies program (MAIS) and has been a guest lecturer in the Anthropology, History and Political Science departments. At KU, Lambertson is also a member of the International Programs Advisory Board, the Honors Program Advisory Board, and the advisory board of the Biodiversity Institute/Natural History Museum, chairing the latter. He was a member of the advisory council of the business school’s Center for International Business Education and Research, and for a time was co-director of that center. Lambertson was active in the early years of the Dole Institute of Politics, as a member of planning groups and as a moderator in conferences on China MFN and the future of NATO, and has participated in several more recent programs. In 2007-2008, Lambertson established and was the first director of the KU-Ft. Leavenworth Program (now the Office of Professional Military Graduate Education).

In 2002, Lambertson was the Freeman Foundation Visiting Professor of Asian Affairs at Claremont McKenna College in California. Beginning in November 2000, and continuing through December 2005, he was American representative of the Korean Peninsula Energy Development Organization in North Korea. In that capacity, he made eleven visits to North Korea, totaling nearly eighteen months in duration.

Lambertson is a member of the International Relations Council of Kansas City, and the American Foreign Service Association. He is a past member of the Kansas International Trade Coordinating Council. He was a founding member of the board of trustees of the Command and General Staff College Foundation and is a member of the Advisory Board of the Simons Center for the Study of Interagency Cooperation. He was awarded the Department of the Army’s Outstanding Civilian Service Medal in 2008.

Lambertson was raised in Fairview, Kansas, and received a BA degree from the University of Redlands in California. He is married to the former Sacie Hooper. They live in Lawrence, Kansas.

Diplomatic posts
Preceded by Daniel Anthony O'Donohue	United States ambassador to Thailand; 1991–1995	Succeeded by William H. Itoh
