= Henry A. Byroade =

United States Army general and diplomat (1913–1993)

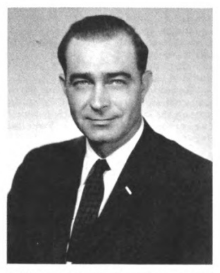

12th United States Ambassador to Pakistan
- In office October 15, 1973 – April 23, 1977
- President: Richard Nixon; Gerald Ford; Jimmy Carter
- Preceded by: Joseph S. Farland
- Succeeded by: Arthur W. Hummel Jr.

United States Ambassador to the Philippines
- In office August 29, 1969 – May 25, 1973
- President: Richard Nixon
- Preceded by: G. Mennen Williams
- Succeeded by: William H. Sullivan

United States Ambassador to Burma
- In office September 10, 1963 – June 11, 1968
- President: John F. Kennedy; Lyndon B. Johnson
- Preceded by: John Scott Everton
- Succeeded by: Arthur W. Hummel Jr.

9th United States Ambassador to Afghanistan
- In office March 21, 1959 – January 19, 1962
- President: Dwight D. Eisenhower; John F. Kennedy
- Preceded by: Sheldon T. Mills
- Succeeded by: John M. Steeves

United States Ambassador to South Africa
- In office October 9, 1956 – January 24, 1959
- President: Dwight D. Eisenhower
- Preceded by: Edward T. Wailes
- Succeeded by: Philip K. Crowe

United States Ambassador to Egypt
- In office March 7, 1955 – September 10, 1956
- President: Dwight D. Eisenhower
- Preceded by: Jefferson Caffery
- Succeeded by: Raymond A. Hare

2nd Assistant Secretary of State for Near Eastern, South Asian, and African Affairs
- In office April 14, 1952 – January 25, 1955
- President: Harry S. Truman; Dwight D. Eisenhower
- Preceded by: George C. McGhee
- Succeeded by: George V. Allen
- Military career
- Born: July 24, 1913; Maumee Township, Allen County, Indiana, U.S.
- Died: December 31, 1993 (aged 80); Bethesda, Maryland, U.S.
- Burial place: Arlington National Cemetery
- Allegiance: United States of America
- Branch: United States Army
- Service years: 1937-1952
- Rank: Brigadier General
- Service number: O-20624
- Unit: Corps of Engineers
- Conflicts: World War II; China-Burma-India Theater; Chinese Civil War; Marshall Mission
- Awards: Legion of Merit (3); Army Distinguished Service Medal; Air Medal; Order of the Cloud and Banner (third and fourth class) (China)

General Henry Alfred Byroade (July 24, 1913 – December 31, 1993) was an American military engineer and later a career diplomat. Over the course of his career, he served in Egypt (1955–1956), South Africa (1956–1959), Afghanistan (1959–1962), Burma (1963–1968), the Philippines (1969–1973), and Pakistan (1973–1977). A 1937 graduate of West Point, he served in the China-Burma-India Theater during World War II, and oversaw the construction of airfields in India and in China for the Fourteenth Air Force and the Boeing B-29 Superfortress bombers of the Twentieth Air Force as part of Operation Matterhorn. After the war he was chief of staff to George C. Marshall with the Marshall Mission to China.

== Early life ==
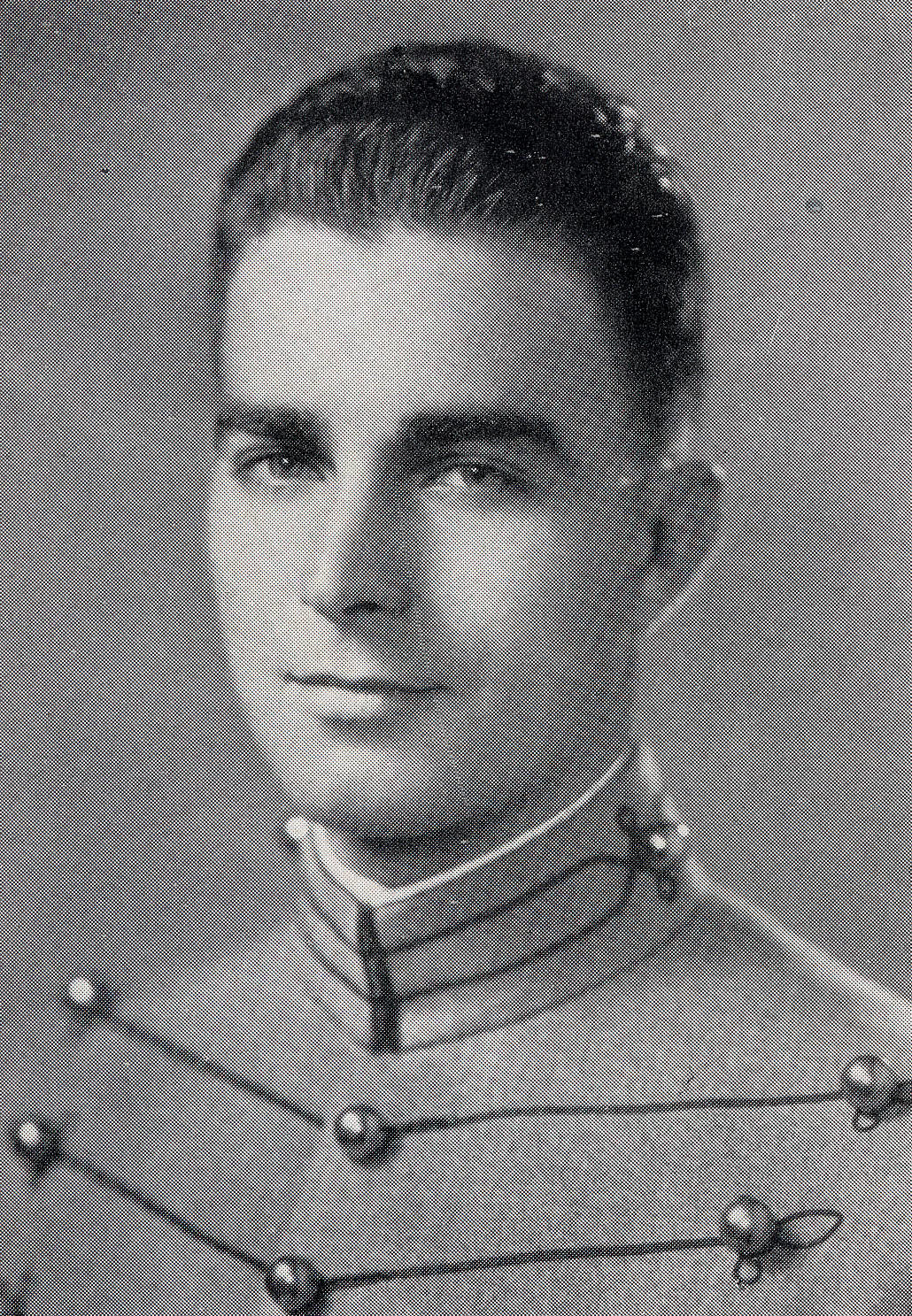
Byroade as a United States Military Academy cadet c. 1937

Henry Alfred Byroade was born in Maumee Township, Allen County, Indiana, on July 24, 1913, the son of Ernest C. and Carrie Byroade. He grew up on a farm. He had a brother and a sister. The family could not afford a college education, so he attempted to secure a scholarship to Yale University, but was unsuccessful. He then secured an appointment to the United States Military Academy at West Point, New York, which he entered on July 1, 1933. He played American football and basketball but his football career ended when he broke his leg as a second classman. As a first classman he participated in showjumping.

== Military career ==
Byroade graduated from West Point on June 12, 1937, ranked 56th in his class, and was commissioned as a second lieutenant in the Corps of Engineers. On graduation day he married Mary Richard of Monroeville, Indiana. They had three sons: Gene, Alan and John. His first posting was to the 3rd Engineer Regiment at Schofield Barracks in the Hawaii Territory on November 20, 1937. As was usual for a Corps of Engineers officer, he was then sent to engineering school to further his technical education. The Corps sent him to Cornell University, which he entered as a student officer on September 19, 1939. He was promoted to first lieutenant on June 12, 1940, and received his Master of Science degree in civil engineering on August 15.

After graduation from Cornell, Byroade went to Langley Field, Virginia, where he commanded a company of the newly reactivated 21st Engineer (Aviation) Regiment. It was the first unit of its kind, and the forerunner of fifty-one aviation battalions that were formed to build airfields around the world. He was promoted to captain on 9 September 1940. After the Japanese attack on Pearl Harbor brought the United States into World War II, the battalion of the 21st Engineer (Aviation) Regiment that he commanded was sent to Mitchel Field on Long Island, New York, to develop it into a wartime air base.

In April 1942 Byroade went to India, where he assumed command of Advance Section 2 of the United States Army Services of Supply (SOS) in the China Burma India Theater (CBI). This section was responsible for logistical activities in Assam. His engineer section initially consisted of two officers and two enlisted men, so it could do little more than supervise the progress of work on the airfields at Chabua, Mohanbari, Dinjan, and Sookerating that would support the aerial supply route to China over the Hump. The work was carried out by the British Royal Engineers and the Central Public Works Department of India, but Byroade found himself drawn into the details of airfield construction. He prevailed on the Royal Engineers to use asphalt instead of concrete for the runways, as the former was available from a local oil refinery. He was promoted to major on May 1, 1942, and lieutenant colonel on January 14, 1943. He was awarded the Legion of Merit for this work, but progress on the airfields lagged behind schedule.

Byroade went to China in August 1943, where he assumed command of Advance Section 4. In this role he was responsible for construction of airfields for use by the Fourteenth Air Force. Local officials expected to receive a share of profits from airfield construction. This was known as "squeeze" in China and was considered a standard business practice there. By autumn, five airfields around Guilin and seven more further east were operational, and Byroade was responsible for twenty-seven airfields in China.

In December 1943 Byroade became the project engineer of the newly-formed 5308th Air Service Area Command, which became responsible for airfield construction in China. His first priority was the development of eight airfields around Kunming for the Fourteenth Air Force, but he was also responsible for the development of new airfields around Chengdu for the Twentieth Air Force as part of Operation Matterhorn, the deployment of Boeing B-29 Superfortress bombers to China. He selected four sites around Chengdu where existing runways could be strengthened and lengthened to accommodate the B-29s, at Xinjin, Guanghan, Qionglai and Pengshan. He assumed the dual role of chief engineer of the Fourteenth Air Force as well as the 5308th Air Service Area Command on 16 March 1944, and he was promoted to colonel on April 1. For his service in China he was awarded the Air Medal and an oak leaf cluster to his Legion of Merit.

Byroade returned to the United States in September 1944, where he became the deputy chief of the Asiatic Theater Section of the War Department General Staff in Washington, D.C. He was awarded a second oak leaf cluster to his Legion of Merit for this service. In December 1945, the wartime Chief of Staff of the United States Army, General of the Army George C. Marshall, was sent to China on a diplomatic mission to broker peace between the Nationalist Party of China and the Chinese Communist Party, and Marshall asked Byroade to act as his chief of staff. Byroade was promoted to brigadier general on January 17, 1946, at the age of 32. He was the first member of his West Point class to reach that rank. He eventually commanded 46 truce teams dispersed across China, but contracted typhoid fever and was evacuated to the United States in September 1946. The Marshall Mission was failure, but Byroade was awarded the Army Distinguished Service Medal for his service. He also received the Chinese Order of the Cloud and Banner (third and fourth class) for his services in China.

In January 1947, Byroade became a student officer at the Armed Forces Staff College in Norfolk, Virginia. His appointment as a brigadier general in the Army of the United States was terminated on January 17, and he reverted to his substantive rank for first lieutenant in the Corps of Engineers. He was promoted to captain on June 12. In August he returned to duty with the War Department General Staff as chief of the International Affairs Group, and he was promoted to lieutenant colonel on July 15, 1948.

== Foreign service career ==
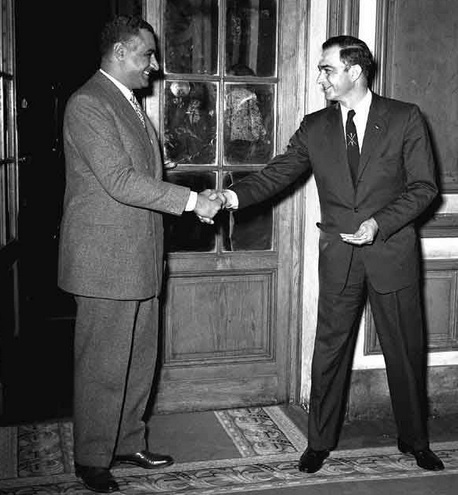
Ambassador Byroade (right) being received by Egyptian President Gamal Abdel Nasser, 1955

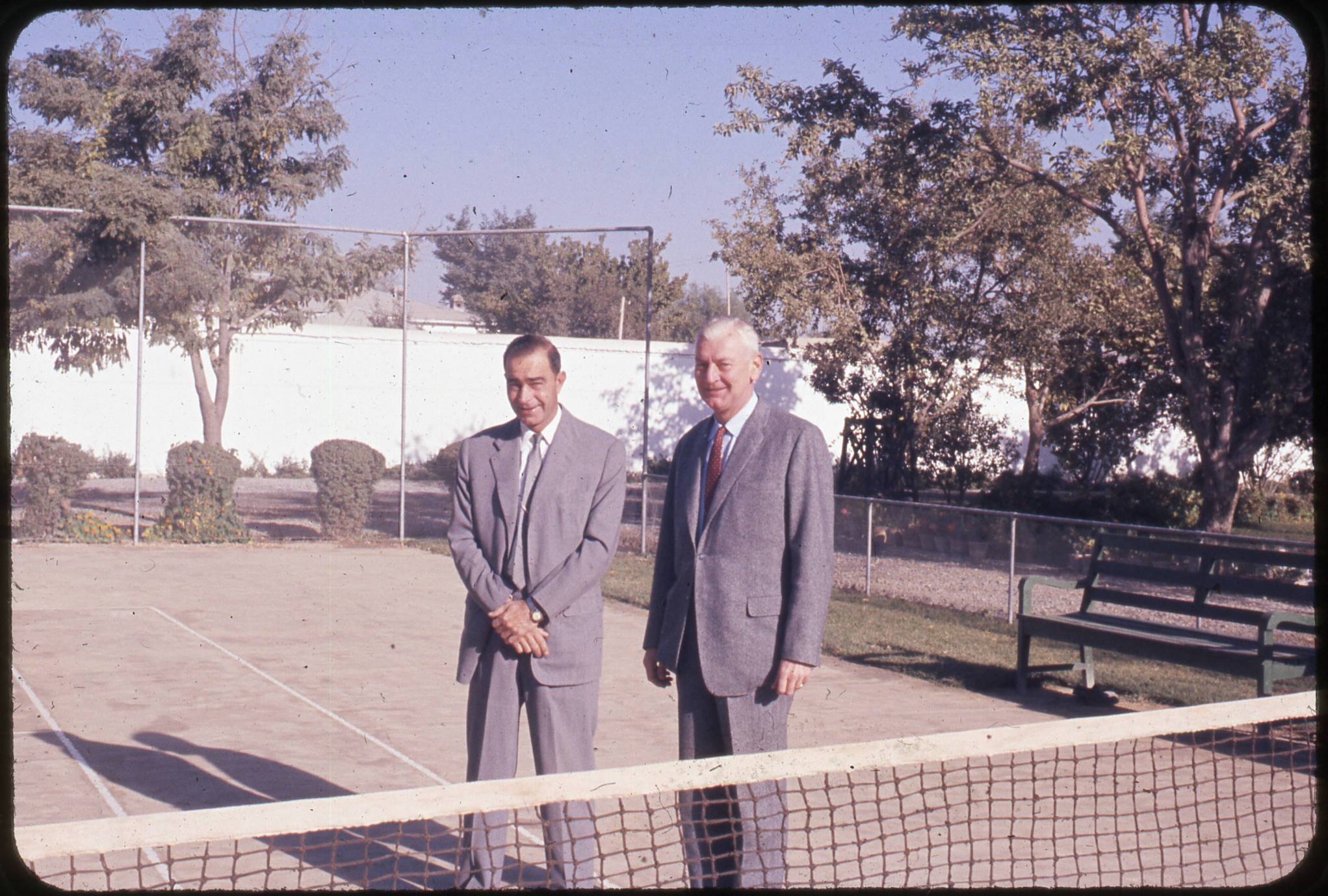
Byroade (left) with Arthur C. Nauman in Afghahistan, 1960

On March 1, 1949, Byroade was seconded to the U.S. Department of State as deputy director of the Office of German Affairs. He became its director on November 1. He expressed a preference for the division of Germany, with West Germany tightly integrated with its neighbors.

Although he wished to remain in the Army, President Harry S. Truman persuaded him to resign his commission so he could be appointed Assistant Secretary of State for Middle East, South Asia, and Africa on April 10, 1952. He held this post until January 25, 1955. The Middle East was troubled at the time, and he had to deal with the conflict between Israel and its Arab neighbors, and the Abadan Crisis in Iran. In 1954, he attracted criticism from both Israel and the Arab world for the Eisenhower administration's policy declaration in which he told the Israelis, "You should drop the attitude of a conqueror and the conviction that force is the only policy that your neighbors will understand" and told the Arabs, "You should accept this state of Israel as an accomplished fact". That same year, he referred to Israel's Zionist ideology and its free admission of Jews through the Law of Return as "a legitimate matter of concern both to the Arabs and to the Western countries".

On January 24, 1955, Byroade was appointed United States Ambassador to Egypt He was considered a friend of Arab causes but unable, during his Egyptian assignment, to prevent an arms deal between Czechoslovakia and Egypt, or to dissuade the Egyptian government of Gamal Abdel Nasser from expanding its campaigns against the West. After the United States refused to finance the construction of the Aswan Dam on the Nile, Nasser turned to the Soviet Union. Criticism of his effectiveness in Cairo in the Eisenhower Administration led to his reassignment to South Africa. Emanuel Neumann, chairman of the executive of the Zionist Organization of America urged that he be removed from Cairo, claiming he had been an apologist for the Egyptian government.

Byroade served as ambassador to South Africa from July 26, 1956, to January 24, 1959. He was then appointed ambassador to South Africa. At the time the border between Pakistan and Afghanistan was closed, and he had to travel via the Soviet Union. His first marriage ended in divorce in 1959. In 1962 he married Jitka Donda Henson. They had one daughter. After departing from Afghanistan on January 19, 1962, he served with the Arms Control and Disarmament Agency until he was appointed ambassador to Burma on September 10, 1963. While there he rebuilt a 1939 Rolls Royce. He departed Burma on June 11, 1968, and for the next year was the State Department official at the Army Industrial College. President Richard Nixon appointed him ambassador to the Philippines on July 22, 1969, and he served in that post until May 25, 1973. His final diplomatic appointment was as ambassador to Pakistan from December 5, 1973, to April 23, 1977.

== Later life ==
Byroade retired from the Foreign Service in 1977 and then spent two years in Saudi Arabia as a vice president of Northrop Corporation and its representative in Saudi Arabia.

He had surgery for cancer in June 1993. He died from cardiopulmonary arrest at Suburban Hospital in Bethesda, Maryland on December 31, 1993, at the age of 80, and was buried in Arlington National Cemetery. His papers are in the Eisenhower Presidential Library.

== Notes ==
Government offices
Preceded by George C. McGhee	Assistant Secretary of State for Near Eastern, South Asian, and African Affairs; April 14, 1952 – January 25, 1955	Succeeded by George V. Allen
Diplomatic posts
Preceded by Jefferson Caffery	United States Ambassador to Egypt; 1955-1956	Succeeded by Raymond A. Hare
Preceded by Edward T. Wailes	United States Ambassador to South Africa; 1956-1959	Succeeded by Philip K. Crowe
Preceded by Sheldon T. Mills	United States Ambassador to Afghanistan; 1959-1962	Succeeded by John M. Steeves
Preceded by John Scott Everton	United States Ambassador to Burma; 1963–1968	Succeeded by Arthur W. Hummel Jr.
Preceded by G. Mennen Williams	United States Ambassador to the Philippines; 1969-1973	Succeeded by William H. Sullivan
Preceded by Joseph S. Farland	United States Ambassador to Pakistan; 1973–1977	Succeeded by Arthur W. Hummel Jr.
