= Leonard S. Unger =

U.S. diplomat

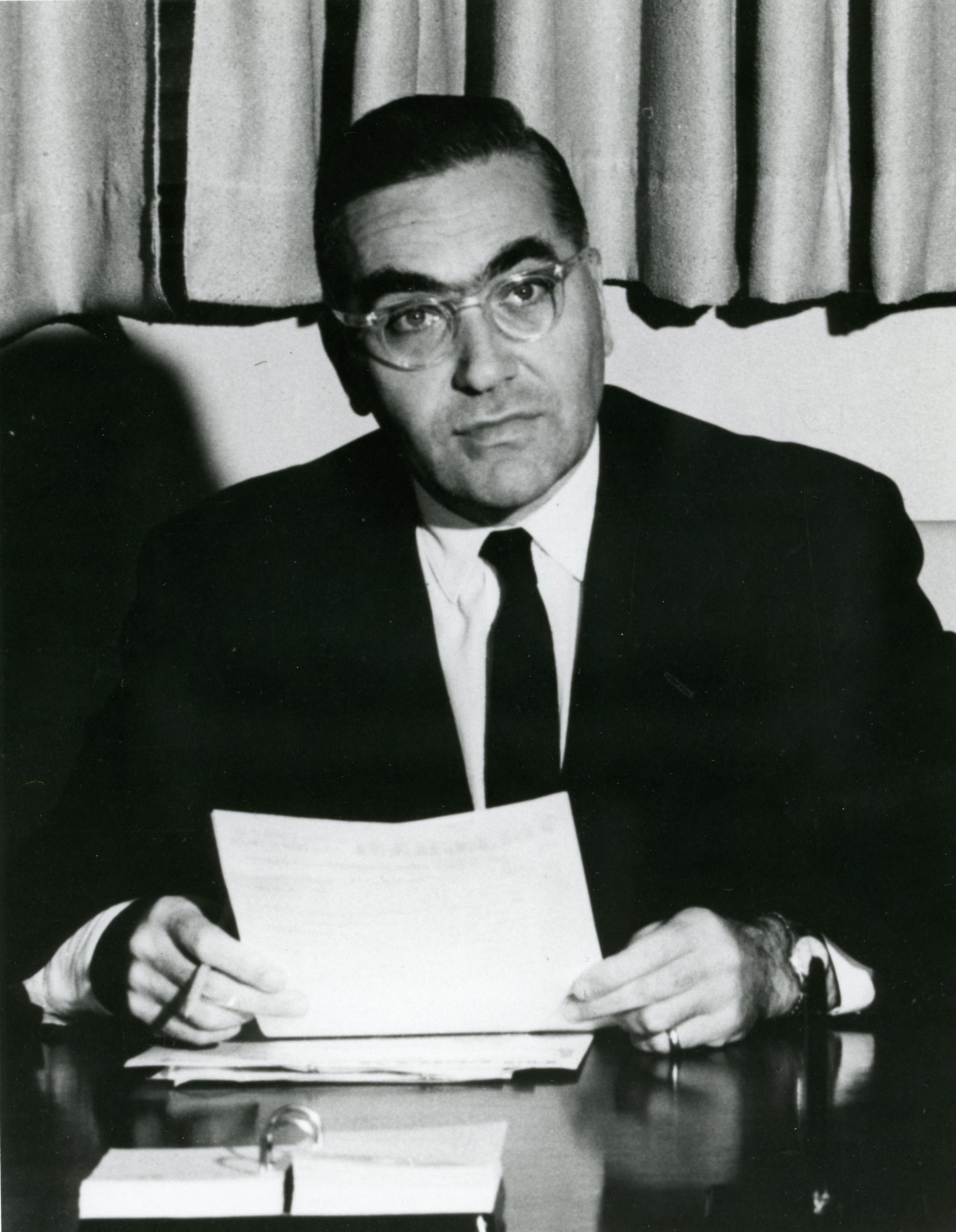

10th United States Ambassador to the Republic of China
- In office May 25, 1974 – January 19, 1979
- President: Richard M. Nixon; Gerald Ford; Jimmy Carter
- Preceded by: Walter P. McConaughy
- Succeeded by: William Andreas Brown (Chief of mission)

8th United States Ambassador to Thailand
- In office October 4, 1967 – November 19, 1973
- President: Lyndon B. Johnson; Richard M. Nixon
- Preceded by: Graham A. Martin
- Succeeded by: William R. Kintner

6th United States Ambassador to Laos
- In office July 25, 1962 – December 1, 1964
- President: John F. Kennedy; Lyndon B. Johnson
- Preceded by: Winthrop G. Brown
- Succeeded by: William H. Sullivan

Personal details
- Born: Leonard Seidman Unger; December 17, 1917 San Diego, California
- Died: June 3, 2010 (aged 92) Sebastopol, California
- Occupation: Diplomat

Leonard Seidman Unger (December 17, 1917 – June 3, 2010) was a diplomat and United States Ambassador to Laos (1962–64), Thailand (1967–73), and was the last US ambassador to the Republic of China (Taiwan) (1974–79).

== Personal life ==
Unger was born in San Diego, California and graduated from Harvard College with a Bachelor of Arts in 1939. He was the co-author of The Trieste negotiations and co-editor of Laos : beyond the revolution. After retiring from the foreign service, he taught at the Fletcher School of Law and Diplomacy at Tufts University. He died on June 3, 2010, in Sebastopol, California.

== Diplomacy career ==
Unger was a member of the American Academy of Diplomacy and Council on Foreign Relations. He began his career in government as a part of the National Resources Planning Board. He was also the Deputy Assistant Secretary of State for Far Eastern Affairs in the Johnson administration. and the head of the Interdepartmental Vietnam Coordinating Committee, a committee set up by President Johnson to explore various 'use of force' options in the period before United States involvement in the Vietnam war escalated. Prior to his involvement in South-East and East Asia, Unger was the United States Political Advisor to the Free Territory of Trieste.

Diplomatic posts
Preceded by Winthrop G. Brown	United States Ambassador to Laos; 1962–1964	Succeeded by William H. Sullivan
Preceded by Graham A. Martin	United States Ambassador to Thailand; 1967–1973	Succeeded by William R. Kintner
Preceded by Walter McConaughy	United States Ambassador to the Republic of China on Taiwan; 1974–1979	Succeeded by William Andreas Brown (Chargé d'affaires)
