= Henry John Whitehouse =

American Episcopal bishop

The Right Reverend Henry John Whitehouse D.D., LL.D., D.C.L.
- Bishop of Illinois
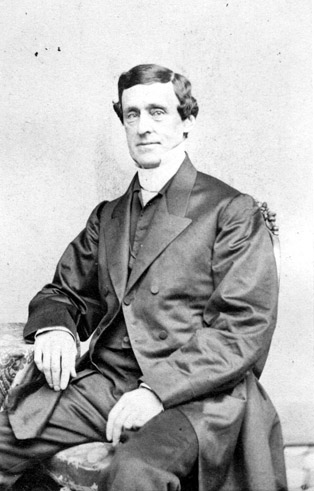
- Province: Episcopal Church
- Diocese: Illinois
- In office: 1852–1874
- Predecessor: Philander Chase
- Successor: William Edward McLaren
- Previous post: Coadjutor Bishop of Illinois (1851-1852)

Orders
- Ordination: August 26, 1827 by William White
- Consecration: November 20, 1851 by Thomas Church Brownell

Personal details
- Born: August 19, 1803 New York City, New York, United States
- Died: August 10, 1874 (aged 70) Chicago, Illinois, United States
- Buried: Green-Wood Cemetery
- Denomination: Anglican
- Parents: James Whitehouse; Eliza Higgs Norman
- Spouse: Evelina Harriet Bruen (m. 1835; died 1864)
- Children: 6
- Education: Columbia University (1821); General Theological Seminary (1824)

Henry John Whitehouse (August 19, 1803 – August 10, 1874) was the second Episcopal bishop of Illinois.

== Early life ==
Whitehouse was born in New York City, the son of James Whitehouse (1767–1854) and Eliza Higgs Norman (1775–1835). Whitehouse was described as a "thorough aristocrat by birth and training and accustomed to every luxury."

He graduated from Columbia University in 1821, and from the General Theological Seminary in 1824. Whitehouse was ordained deacon in 1824, and was ordained priest in 1827.

== Career ==
After his ordination as priest, he became rector of Christ Church in Reading, Pennsylvania. Two years later, he moved to become rector of St. Luke's Church in Rochester, New York, during which time he married. He remained there for fifteen years before moving to New York in 1844 to become rector of St. Thomas Church.

=== Bishop of Illinois ===
Whitehouse was elected coadjutor Bishop of Illinois in 1851. He was the 55th bishop in the ECUSA, and was consecrated by Bishops Thomas Church Brownell, Alfred Lee, and Manton Eastburn. Upon the death of Bishop Philander Chase, Whitehouse became bishop, but refused to take up his seat for nine years, until his salary demands were met. The diocesan convention in 1860 charged him with dereliction of duty and generally condemned him. During the American Civil War, Whitehouse displayed decidedly pro-Southern sympathies, further alienating his Illinois flock.

Whitehouse identified with high church Anglicanism, and in 1868 he wrote of the real presence of Christ in the Eucharist. Several of his clergy, led by Charles Edward Cheney, denounced the Anglo-Catholic idea, accusing Whitehouse of "unprotestantizing this Protestant Episcopal Church, corrupting her doctrine, debasing her worship, and over-turning her long-established rites, ceremonies, and usages." Whitehouse had his revenge when, on hearing of Cheney's unauthorized omissions of certain liturgical phrases, he attempted to have Cheney deposed, and by 1871, he was successful in having Cheney suspended from the ministry. Cheney later became one of the original clergymen of the Reformed Episcopal Church.

While in England in 1867, Whitehouse delivered the opening sermon before the first Pan-Anglican conference at Lambeth Palace, by invitation of the Archbishop of Canterbury. He was among the first American bishops to advocate for a cathedral system in the Episcopal Church.

== Personal life ==
On August 8, 1835, Whitehouse married Evelina Harriet Bruen (1806-1864). Together, they were the parents of five sons and one daughter. They gave middle names to some of their children, specifically Meredyth, Cope, and FitzHugh, which were surnames of women who had married into the Whitehouse family prior to 1800. Their children were:

- Henry Bruen Whitehouse (1838–1889), an attorney
- Edward Norman Whitehouse (1839–1904), a career Naval officer whose duties included the office of Paymaster
- Frederic Cope Whitehouse (1842–1911), also an attorney, but he engaged so ardently in his avocations of archaeology and Egyptology that his obituary in The New York Times referred to him as “the well-known Egyptologist.” He did not marry.
- William FitzHugh Whitehouse (1846–1909), yet another attorney who married Frances Sheldon (1852–1944), the niece of William B. Ogden, the First Mayor of Chicago.
- Louisa Bruen Whitehouse (1847–1919), who married Edwin Bernon Sheldon (1849–1923), brother of Frances Sheldon, the wife of William FitzHugh Whitehouse (see above).
- Francis Meredyth Whitehouse (1848–1938), the architect who married Mary Armour (1868–1958).

Henry John Whitehouse died in Chicago on August 10, 1874. He is buried in the Whitehouse family plot in Green-Wood Cemetery, Brooklyn, New York.

=== Descendants ===
Through his son William, he was the grandfather of diplomat Sheldon Whitehouse (1883–1965), who was married to Mary Crocker Alexander (1895–1986) in 1920, great-grandson was Ambassador Charles S. Whitehouse (1921–2001). His great-great-grandson, Sheldon Whitehouse (born 1955), is a U.S. Senator from Rhode Island.

=== Legacy ===
In 1934, his son Francis, along with other members of the family, donated a "missionary window" at the Cathedral of St. John the Divine in memory of his father. The windows, designed by Wilbur Herbert Burnham, were dedicated by Bishop William T. Manning.

== Notes ==
Episcopal Church (USA) titles
Preceded by Philander Chase	Bishop of Illinois; 1852–1874	Succeeded by William Edward McLaren
