= William P. Snow =

American diplomat (1907-1986)

William Pennell Snow (January 24, 1907 – January 1986) was U.S. Ambassador to Burma (1959–1961) and to Paraguay (1961–1967). He was a career State Dept. officer who had previously served as Vice Consul in Paris, Assistant Chief of British Commonwealth Affairs, and Deputy Assistant Secretary of State for Inter-American Affairs.

Snow was born in Bangor, Maine and graduated from Bowdoin College and then Tufts College. In 1958, while serving as Deputy Assistant Secretary of State for Inter-American Affairs, Snow sent the telegram from Washington to Havana authorizing the suspension of arms supplies to the government of Fulgencio Batista, one milestone in the fall of that regime to Fidel Castro's rebels a few months later. Although many historians find Snow's authorization of the March 1958 arms embargo "puzzling," in the words of Thomas Paterson, the Bureau of Inter-American Affairs under Assistant Secretary of State Roy Richard Rubottom had been distancing itself from the Batista government since the summer of 1957. Snow is best known among diplomatic historians for his role in this episode.

Snow's position on U.S. Cuba policy was close to that of Rubottom and his various deputies. U.S. Ambassador to Cuba Earl E. T. Smith had consistently argued for the restoration of arms shipments in this period in exchange for the Cuban government guaranteeing free elections. But Batista's failure to lift the suspension of constitutional guarantees throughout 1957 and the spring of 1958 led to Rubottom and Snow to decide that the Cuban government would be unable to hold free elections, as the state of martial law prevented effective campaigning by candidates that were not associated with the government coalition. As a result, on 14 March 1958, the United States officially suspended arms shipments to the Cuban government. Snow was one of the main forces within the State Department pushing for this embargo, acting in concert with Rubottom and Director for Middle American Affairs William A. Wieland to convince the respective Department of Defense and Mutual Security Program-related agencies of the need to cut off the Cuban arms pipeline. The primary two justifications given were the misuse of Military Assistance Program grant aid by Cuban government forces in Oriente province and the threat to Mutual Security Program funding in Congress caused by the uproar over Batista's attempts to subdue the insurgency with American weaponry. Underlying this arms embargo was the belief among Rubottom, Wieland, Snow, and others that the United States would have to do business with whoever succeeded Batista. It did not seem feasible until November 1958 that Fidel Castro's 26th of July Movement, after a wave of military defections in the east, would be the opposition group to overthrow the government.

Thus, even though Snow played a large role in the decision to implement the arms embargo, he was in step with the rest of the State Department, and his recommendations were consistent with the intelligence they had on potential coup plotters and the strength of insurgent groups. Both he and Secretary Rubottom largely escaped recriminations once Fidel Castro consolidated power in mid-1959, but William Wieland was publicly chastised by Congress and his diplomatic career ended over Rubottom and Wieland's decisions.

Diplomatic posts
Preceded by Walter P. McConaughy	U.S. Ambassador to Burma; 1959–1961	Succeeded by John Scott Everton
Preceded by Harry F. Stimpson, Jr.	United States Ambassador to Paraguay; 1961–1967	Succeeded by Benigno C. Hernández
