= Patricia M. Byrne =

American diplomat

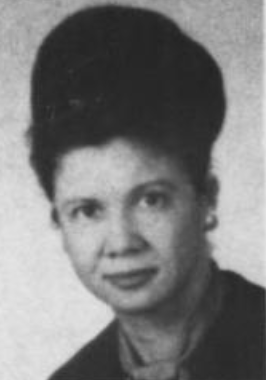
- Patricia M. Byrne, from a 1964 publication of the US Department of State

United States Ambassador to Burma
- In office November 27, 1979 – September 4, 1983
- Appointed by: Jimmy Carter
- Preceded by: Maurice Darrow Bean
- Succeeded by: Daniel Anthony O'Donohue

United States Ambassador to Mali
- In office September 16, 1976 – October 30, 1979
- Appointed by: Gerald Ford
- Preceded by: Robert O. Blake
- Succeeded by: Anne Forrester

Personal details
- Born: June 1, 1925 Cleveland, Ohio, U.S.
- Died: November 23, 2007 (aged 82) Washington, D.C., U.S.
- Education: Vassar College; Johns Hopkins University; National War College

Patricia Mary Byrne (June 1, 1925 – November 23, 2007) was an American diplomat who served as United States Ambassador to Burma from November 1979 to September 1983, and United States Ambassador to Mali from December 1976 to October 1979.

== Early life and education ==
Byrne was born in Cleveland, the daughter of Edward F. and Mary Kreutzer Byrne, and was a resident of South Euclid, Ohio. She graduated second in her class from high school in Cleveland. She credits her father for encouraging her independence and her ambition to enter the foreign service.

Byrne was an honors student at Vassar College, where she shaped her studies toward her foreign service career goals, studying French, Spanish and Russian. She graduated in 1946 with an A.B. degree. During two of her college summers she returned to Cleveland, one year working as a riveter in a warplane factory, and another year assembling gun parts. A Vassar fellowship allowed her to attend graduate school at the School of Advanced International Studies at Johns Hopkins University based in Washington, D.C. and she earned a master's degree there in 1947.

Byrne attended the National War College from 1968 to 1969 when she became the school's first female graduate.

== Career ==
After completing her studies, Byrne began working for the Central Intelligence Agency and took the competitive Foreign Service examination. She was one of 19 women selected for U.S. Foreign Service, where she served from 1949 to 1989.

After Byrne joined the Foreign Service, she was posted to Athens. She was assigned to Saigon from 1950 to 1955. After serving as a desk officer for Laos at the State Department, she accepted international assignments in Turkey and Laos. Byrne served as a member of the U.S. Delegation to the Geneva Conference on Laos from 1961 to 1962.

After graduating, she served at the embassy in Paris. In 1973 she became deputy chief of mission in Columbo, Sri Lanka. From 1975 to 1976, Byrne took the Senior Seminar at the Foreign Service Institute in foreign policy.

In 1984 Byrne was a foreign affairs fellow assigned to Georgetown University's Institute for the Study of Diplomacy.

== Personal life ==
Byrne retired in Washington, where she was a member of the Diplomatic and Consular Officers, Retired, and was twice elected to the group's board. She died on November 23, 2007.

Diplomatic posts
Preceded by Ralph J. McGuire	U.S. Ambassador to Mali; 1976–1979	Succeeded by Anne Forrester
Preceded by Maurice Darrow Bean	U.S. Ambassador to Burma; 1979–1983	Succeeded by Daniel Anthony O'Donohue
