= Parker W. Borg =

American diplomat (born 1939)

Borg says his farewells to students at the American University of Rome in May 2008

Parker W. Borg (born May 25, 1939, in Minneapolis, Minnesota) is a former professor at the American University of Rome and a former United States ambassador to Mali and Iceland.

Borg graduated from Dartmouth College in 1961 and received an MPA degree from Cornell University in 1965. Borg was among the first wave of Peace Corps volunteers, teaching English in the Philippines from 1961 to 1963.

== Career ==
He entered the US Foreign Service in 1965 as Foreign Service officer-general in Kuala Lumpur, where he learned the Malay language. In 1967-1970 he was on detail to the Agency for International Development with the CORDS program in Vietnam, where he learned Vietnamese. His nomination on July 22, 1991 to be United States Ambassador to Burma was not acted upon by the Senate, due to political concerns at the time. Franklin P. Huddle, Jr. served as Chargé d'Affaires ad interim in Rangoon September 1990 to September 1994.

Borg acted as 'Diplomat in Residence' for the American University of Rome from 2005 until spring of 2008, the first to hold the position. At the University, he taught one course each semester in addition to participating in various University activities. The classes he taught include Comparative Foreign Politics and Current American Foreign Policy. Borg was one of two advisers for the University's delegation to Harvard National Model United Nations for the past two sessions.

In Spring of 2008, Borg was recognized during the graduation ceremony as the faculty member who most enriched the lives of his students.

Borg currently teaches in the international relations program at the American Graduate School in Paris (AGS).

Diplomatic posts
Preceded by Anne Forrester Holloway	U.S. Ambassador to Mali; 1981–1984	Succeeded by Robert J. Ryan, Jr.
Preceded by Sigmund A. Rogich	U.S. Ambassador to Iceland; 1993–1996	Succeeded by Day O. Mount
