= Lucy Blake =

American conservationist

Lucy Blake is an American conservationist, President of the Northern Sierra Partnership. She was a 2000 MacArthur Fellow. She founded the Sierra Business Council in 1994 and won the Pat Brown Award. While with the SBC, the council published Planning for Prosperity (1997), a set of principles for land-use planning in rural communities, and the Sierra Nevada Wealth Index (1996), which describes the community's well-being based on social, economic, and environmental health. Blake works for the Department of Energy on energy and natural resources.
