= Anne Forrester Holloway =

American diplomat (1941–2006)

8th United States Ambassador to Mali
- In office January 5, 1980 – February 27, 1981
- President: Jimmy Carter; Ronald Reagan
- Preceded by: Patricia Mary Byrne
- Succeeded by: Parker W. Borg

Personal details
- Born: June 2, 1941 Philadelphia, Pennsylvania, U.S.
- Died: June 23, 2006 (aged 65) New York City, New York, U.S.
- Cause of death: Pancreatic cancer
- Spouse: Marvin Holloway
- Children: 2
- Education: Bennington College (BA); Howard University (MA); Antioch/Union Graduate School (PhD)
- Profession: Diplomat

Anne Forrester Holloway (June 2, 1941 – June 23, 2006) was an American diplomat who held offices with the United States Department of State and the United Nations. From 1979 to 1981, she served as United States Ambassador to Mali.

== Career ==
Prior to serving as the US ambassador to Mali, Holloway had been staff director for Andrew Young, when he was United States Ambassador to the United Nations. From 1985 to her retirement in October 2001, she worked for the U.N. in various capacities: with the United Nations Development Programme (UNDP); with the United Nations Regional Bureau for Africa, and with the United Nations Foundation. Following her retirement from the UN, she worked as a senior policy advisor for Rep. Juanita Millender-McDonald (D-CA) for a year, then as a consultant on African and Caribbean development issues.

In her earlier days, she was the first managing editor of Drum and Spear Press.

== Family life ==
She was born about 1941 in Philadelphia, Pennsylvania, and died June 23, 2006, in New York, New York. She married Marvin Holloway (they later divorced). They had two daughters.

Diplomatic posts
Preceded by Patricia M. Byrne	United States Ambassador to Mali; 1979–1981	Succeeded by Parker W. Borg
