= Arthur W. Hummel Jr. =

American diplomat (1920–2001)

Arthur William Hummel Jr.
- Hummel c. 1981

United States Ambassador to China
- In office July 30, 1981 – September 24, 1985
- President: Ronald Reagan
- Preceded by: Leonard Woodcock
- Succeeded by: Winston Lord

United States Ambassador to Pakistan
- In office June 4, 1977 – July 19, 1981
- President: Jimmy Carter; Ronald Reagan
- Preceded by: Henry A. Byroade
- Succeeded by: Ronald I. Spiers

United States Ambassador to Ethiopia
- In office February 20, 1975 – July 6, 1976
- President: Gerald Ford
- Preceded by: Thomas W. McElhiney
- Succeeded by: Frederic L. Chapin

United States Ambassador to Burma
- In office September 10, 1968 – July 22, 1971
- President: Lyndon B. Johnson; Richard M. Nixon
- Preceded by: Henry A. Byroade
- Succeeded by: Edwin W. Martin

13th Assistant Secretary of State for East Asian and Pacific Affairs
- In office July 12, 1976 – March 14, 1977
- Preceded by: Philip Habib
- Succeeded by: Richard Holbrooke

Personal details
- Born: June 1, 1920 Shanxi Province, China
- Died: February 6, 2001 (aged 80) Chevy Chase, Maryland
- Parents: Arthur W. Hummel Sr. (father); Ruth Bookwalter Hummel (mother)
- Occupation: Diplomat

Arthur William Hummel Jr. (Chinese: 恒安石; pinyin: Héng Ānshí; birth name Arthur Millbourne Hummel; June 1, 1920 – February 6, 2001) was a United States diplomat.

== Early life ==
He was born in Fenzhou, Shanxi, China, to Christian missionaries Arthur W. Hummel Sr. (1884–1975) and Ruth Bookwalter Hummel. His family moved to Beijing when he was 4. In 1927, when he was 7, the disruption and anti-foreign violence of the Northern Expedition forced his family to relocate to Massachusetts. When he was 8, his parents moved to Washington, D.C., where his father worked as Chief of the Orientalia Division at the Library of Congress. His parents sent him to Westtown School, a Quaker boarding school outside Philadelphia, for high school, where he graduated in 1938. He then attended Antioch College in Yellow Springs, Ohio, earning a B.A in 1940. In the same year, he then returned to Beijing to study at the California College of Chinese Studies and to study Chinese, since he had forgotten what he had learned as a child. He also taught English at the Catholic University of Peking.

Peaceful study in the ancient capital did not last long, however. After the attack on Pearl Harbor Hummel was taken by the Japanese and interned at the Weihsien Internment Camp in Shandong Province. Though food was not adequate, life at the camp was relatively relaxed, since it was far from the battle-front. Hummel was put in charge of the hospital laboratory, taking advantage of his college training. One of his fellow internees was Langdon Gilkey, who later became a well-known theologian. In 1944 he and Laurance Tipton, a British prisoner, escaped and joined a unit of the Nationalist guerrillas who fought against the Japanese. After World War II ended, he worked with the United Nations Relief and Rehabilitation Administration, an organization which helped rebuild China along with other countries needing aid after the war. Hummel then attended the University of Chicago, graduating with a master's degree in International Studies in 1949.

== Career ==
Arthur Hummel joined the United States Foreign Service in 1950. In 1960, Hummel attended the National War College. He was director of Voice of America from 1961 to 1963. He served after that as Deputy Chief of Mission at the U.S. Embassy in Taiwan before being appointed to the position of United States Ambassador to Burma in 1968. He left his post on July 22, 1971, to become United States Ambassador to Ethiopia from 1975 to 1976. He also was Assistant Secretary of State for East Asian and Pacific Affairs from 1976 to 1977. On June 8, 1977, he was appointed United States Ambassador to Pakistan, where he served until 1981. He was United States Ambassador to China from 1981 to 1985. He then joined the third and final United States-China communiqué as a negotiator where he helped the U.S. reaffirm their ties with the People's Republic of China.

== Retirement ==
After retiring from the U.S. Department of the State, he acted as the director of the Hopkins-Nanjing Center for Chinese and American Studies. Hummel died on February 6, 2001, in his home in Chevy Chase, Maryland, at the age of 80.

== Notes ==
Diplomatic posts
Preceded by Henry A. Byroade	U.S. Ambassador to Burma; 1968–1971	Succeeded by Edwin W. Martin
Preceded by Thomas W. McElhiney	U.S. Ambassador to Ethiopia; 1975–1976	Succeeded by Frederic L. Chapin
Preceded by Philip Habib	Assistant Secretary of State for East Asian and Pacific Affairs; 1976	Succeeded by Richard Holbrooke
Preceded by Henry A. Byroade	U.S. Ambassador to Pakistan; 1977–1981	Succeeded by Robert I. Spiers
Preceded by Leonard Woodcock	U.S. Ambassador to China; 1981–1985	Succeeded by Winston Lord
