= Charles S. Whitehouse =

American diplomat (1921–2001)

Charles Whitehouse
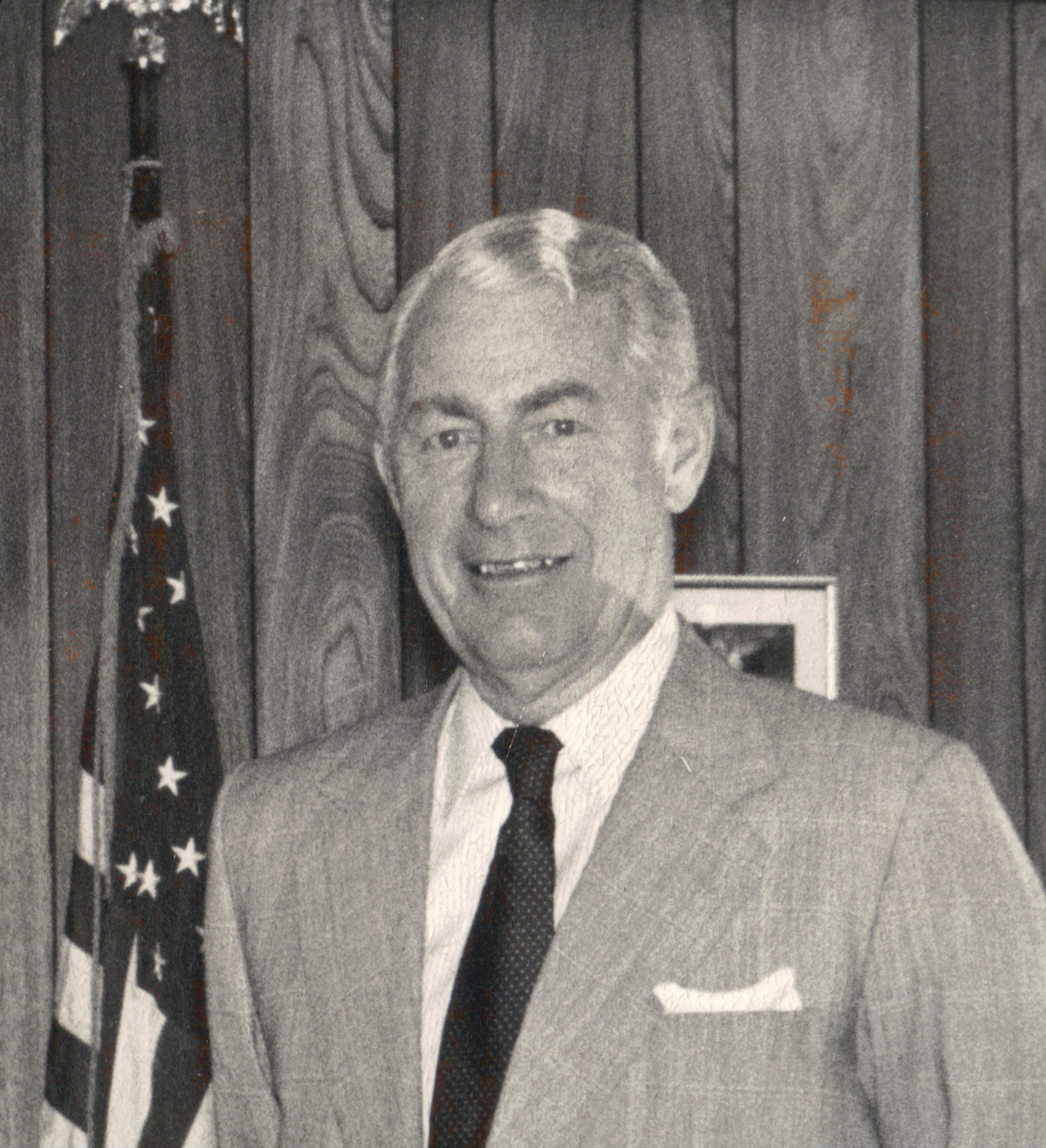

28th United States Ambassador to Thailand
- In office May 30, 1975 – June 19, 1978
- President: Gerald Ford; Jimmy Carter
- Preceded by: William Kintner
- Succeeded by: Morton I. Abramowitz

10th United States Ambassador to Laos
- In office September 20, 1973 – April 12, 1975
- President: Richard Nixon; Gerald Ford
- Preceded by: G. McMurtrie Godley
- Succeeded by: Thomas J. Corcoran

Personal details
- Born: Charles Sheldon Whitehouse; November 5, 1921 Paris, France
- Died: June 25, 2001 (aged 79) near Marshall, Virginia, U.S.
- Spouse(s): Molly Rand (Divorced); Janet Grayson
- Children: 3, including Sheldon
- Parent: Edwin Sheldon Whitehouse; Mary Crocker
- Relatives: Henry John Whitehouse (great-grandfather); Charles Crocker (great-grandfather)
- Education: Yale University (BA)
- Civilian awards: Distinguished Honor Award; Superior Honor Award; Legion of Honor

Military service
- Allegiance: United States
- Branch/service: United States Marine Corps
- Years of service: 1942–1946
- Battles/wars: World War II
- Military awards: Distinguished Flying Cross (7); Air Medal (21)

Charles Sheldon Whitehouse (November 5, 1921 – June 25, 2001) was an American career diplomat. He was United States Ambassador to Laos and the United States Ambassador to Thailand.

== Early life ==
Whitehouse was born November 5, 1921, in Paris, France, the son of American parents Mary Crocker (née Alexander) and Sheldon Whitehouse (1883–1965). His father was a foreign service officer, and served as U.S. Minister to Guatemala, 1930–1933, and to Colombia, 1933–1934. Charles Whitehouse was a great-grandson of railroad executive Charles Crocker, and a grandson of Charles Beatty Alexander and Harriet Crocker. He was also a great-grandson of Henry John Whitehouse, Episcopal bishop of Illinois.

== U.S. Marine Corps ==
In 1942, he interrupted his studies at Yale University to join the United States Marine Corps. He attended Navy flight school and became a Marine dive bomber pilot and saw combat in the Pacific theater, where he was awarded 7 Distinguished Flying Crosses and received 21 Air Medals. After leaving the Marine Corps in 1946, he reentered Yale University, where he was a classmate of William F. Buckley.

== Government career ==
Upon graduation from Yale in 1947, Whitehouse joined the Central Intelligence Agency and worked in the Congo, Turkey, Belgium and Cambodia. He moved over to the State Department in 1956 to serve as assistant to the undersecretary for economic affairs, and in 1959 he became a regular foreign service officer. He later served as the State Department's Congo Desk officer, and also served on the staff of the department's Office of Personnel. He attended the National War College, and graduated in 1966.

Following a tour to the Republic of Guinea, 1969–1970, as deputy chief of mission, Whitehouse served two tours of duty in Vietnam. During his first tour, he was deputy for civil operations and rural development support. He returned to Washington in 1971 to become acting assistant secretary for East Asian affairs and returned to Vietnam in 1972 as deputy ambassador under Ambassador Ellsworth Bunker.

Afterwards, he provided an oral history of his time in Vietnam to the Association for Diplomatic Studies and Training.

In September 1973, Whitehouse became ambassador to Laos, his first of two ambassadorships. In Laos he oversaw decreasing American military aid to Hmong who had been fighting a proxy war against Communist forces (Pathet Lao and North Vietnamese Army troops) in northern Laos. Eight months after he left Vientiane to take up his new post as ambassador to Thailand in Bangkok in April 1975, the Communists seized power and proclaimed the Lao People's Democratic Republic.

Whitehouse's arrival in Bangkok coincided with a crisis in United States–Thai relations that followed the collapse of South Vietnam, and which was aggravated by the Marine recapture of the SS Mayagüez, an American ship that Cambodian Communist gunboats had seized in the Gulf of Thailand. It was also a time of serious political unrest in Thailand, which culminated in the bloody suppression of student demonstrations on October 6, 1976, and a military coup that overthrew the elected government shortly thereafter. Whitehouse presided over the closing of the last American bases in Thailand in 1976, an action the Thais had requested. He also oversaw the creation and management of the resettlement camps in Thailand that helped refugees from the wars in Vietnam, Laos and Cambodia resettle in the U.S. and other countries.

In addition to his military decorations, Whitehouse received the State Department's Superior Honor Award, the Agency for International Development Distinguished Honor Award, and the State Department's Distinguished Honor Award. He was also a member of the French Legion of Honor.

== Later years ==
After his retirement from the foreign service in August 1978, Whitehouse served as president of the American Foreign Service Association and chairman of Lycée Rochambeau of Bethesda, Maryland. He later became chairman of the Piedmont Environmental Council in Warrenton, Virginia, and was instrumental in blocking the Disney Corporation's efforts to build an amusement park and other developments on and near historic lands in Northern Virginia.

In 1988, Whitehouse was called out of retirement by Defense Secretary Frank Carlucci to become the first Assistant Secretary of Defense for Special Operations/Low Intensity Conflict & Interdependent Capabilities, with the assignment of strengthening cooperation among army, navy and air force after a series of disagreements and botched operations. He served in this position until 1989.

Whitehouse became a joint master of foxhounds of the Orange County Hunt in The Plains, Virginia, in 1990. He served in that capacity until his death.

Whitehouse was tall, elegant and regal-looking, and in 1966 The Washington Post named him one of the "Ten Most Attractive Men in Washington." He was an excellent off-the-cuff speaker and raconteur, and he had a flair for the theatrical that continued into his retirement. He played George Washington in a documentary on the general, and once played the Marquis de Lafayette in a Fauquier County Historical Society ceremony commemorating Lafayette's 1825 visit to Warrenton, Virginia.

He died June 25, 2001, at the age of 79 of cancer at his home near Marshall, Virginia. He is buried in St. Mary's Episcopal Churchyard in Portsmouth, Rhode Island.

== Personal life ==
Whitehouse's first marriage to Molly Rand ended in divorce. From this marriage, he had two sons, including Sheldon Whitehouse, and a daughter. He married a second time, to Janet Ketchum Grayson.

Diplomatic posts
Preceded by G. McMurtrie Godley	U.S. Ambassador to Laos; 1973–1975	Succeeded by Thomas J. Corcoran
Preceded by William R. Kintner	U.S. Ambassador to Thailand; 1975–1978	Succeeded by Morton I. Abramowitz
