= Daniel Anthony O'Donohue =

American diplomat (1931–2019)

United States Ambassador to Burma
- In office November 14, 1983 – December 16, 1986
- Appointed by: Ronald Reagan
- Preceded by: Patricia M. Byrne
- Succeeded by: Burton Levin

United States Ambassador to Thailand
- In office July 11, 1988 – August 10, 1991
- Appointed by: Ronald Reagan
- Preceded by: William Andreas Brown
- Succeeded by: David Floyd Lambertson

Personal details
- Born: October 27, 1931 Detroit, Michigan, U.S.
- Died: May 16, 2019 (aged 87) Alexandria, Virginia, U.S.

Daniel Anthony O'Donohue (October 27, 1931 – May 16, 2019) was an American diplomat who served as United States Ambassador to Burma from November 1983 to December 1986, and to Thailand from July 11, 1988 to August 10, 1991. He was a career foreign service officer.

O'Donohue joined the foreign service in 1959 and went on to serve in Italy, South Korea, Ghana, Thailand, and Burma along with various offices in Washington D.C. as a part of the State Department.

Diplomatic posts
Preceded by Patricia M. Byrne	U.S. Ambassador to Burma; 1983–1986	Succeeded by Burton Levin
Preceded by William Andreas Brown	United States Ambassador to The Kingdom of Thailand; 1988 – 1991	Succeeded by David Floyd Lambertson
