= List of ambassadors of the United States to Myanmar =

Ambassador of the United States to Burma
- Seal of the United States Department of State

- Flag of a United States ambassador

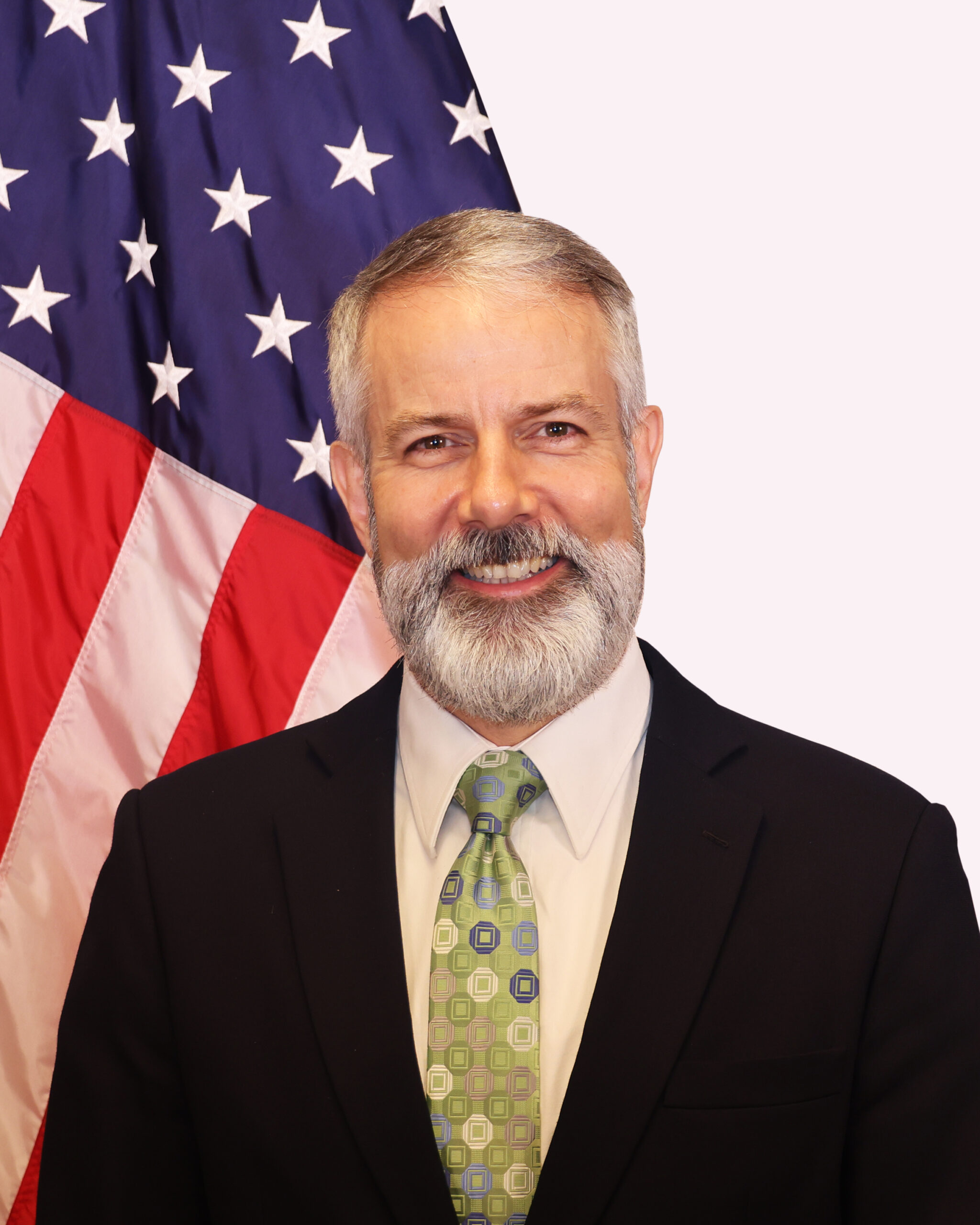
- Incumbent; Douglas Sonnek; Chargés d'Affaires ad interim since January 15, 2026
- Style: Ambassador
- Residence: Rangoon, Burma
- Nominator: The president of the United States
- Appointer: The president with Senate advice and consent
- Inaugural holder: J. Klahr Huddle as Ambassador Extraordinary and Plenipotentiary
- Formation: October 17, 1947
- Website: mm.usembassy.gov

This is a list of ambassadors of the United States to Burma. In 1989 the military government of Burma changed the name of the nation to Myanmar, but the United States government—and all other Western governments—do not accept the name and still refer to the country as Burma in official usage.

Burma became a province of India in 1886 under the British Raj. The country was occupied by Japan during World War II but after the war, again came under control of Britain. In 1946 Britain began negotiations with the Burmese to establish independence for the nation, and reached a final agreement on January 27, 1947. A transitional government was established and Burma became fully independent on January 4, 1948.

The United States recognized Burma and established the Embassy of the United States, Rangoon on September 19, 1947, with Earl L. Packer as Chargé d'Affaires ad interim.

After 1990 the United States appointed no ambassador to Burma in protest against the policies of the military regime. A chargé d'affaires became the head of mission until 2012.

== Ambassadors ==
Name	Title	Appointed	Presented credentials	Terminated mission	Notes
J. Klahr Huddle – Career FSO	Ambassador Extraordinary and Plenipotentiary	October 17, 1947	March 3, 1948	November 28, 1949	
David McK. Key – Career FSO	Ambassador Extraordinary and Plenipotentiary	March 17, 1950	April 26, 1950	October 28, 1951	
William J. Sebald – Career FSO	Ambassador Extraordinary and Plenipotentiary	April 25, 1952	July 18, 1952	July 15, 1954	
Joseph C. Satterthwaite – Career FSO	Ambassador Extraordinary and Plenipotentiary	April 4, 1955	May 10, 1955	April 1, 1957	
Walter P. McConaughy – Career FSO	Ambassador Extraordinary and Plenipotentiary	May 20, 1957	August 20, 1957	November 2, 1959	
William P. Snow – Career FSO	Ambassador Extraordinary and Plenipotentiary	November 9, 1959	December 1, 1959	May 4, 1961	
John Scott Everton – Career FSO	Ambassador Extraordinary and Plenipotentiary	May 4, 1961	June 10, 1961	May 21, 1963	
Henry A. Byroade – Career FSO	Ambassador Extraordinary and Plenipotentiary	September 10, 1963	October 7, 1963	June 11, 1968	
Arthur W. Hummel, Jr. – Career FSO	Ambassador Extraordinary and Plenipotentiary	September 26, 1968	October 1968	July 22, 1971	
Edwin W. Martin – Career FSO	Ambassador Extraordinary and Plenipotentiary	August 10, 1971	October 1, 1971	November 20, 1973	
David L. Osborn – Career FSO	Ambassador Extraordinary and Plenipotentiary	February 28, 1974	March 22, 1974	July 25, 1977	Osborn and subsequent ambassadors were commissioned to the Socialist Republic of the Union of Burma.
Maurice Darrow Bean – Career FSO	Ambassador Extraordinary and Plenipotentiary	September 19, 1977	November 8, 1977	August 10, 1979	
Patricia M. Byrne – Career FSO	Ambassador Extraordinary and Plenipotentiary	November 27, 1979	January 14, 1980	September 14, 1983	
Daniel Anthony O'Donohue – Career FSO	Ambassador Extraordinary and Plenipotentiary	November 14, 1983	December 26, 1983	December 16, 1986	
Burton Levin – Career FSO	Ambassador Extraordinary and Plenipotentiary	April 7, 1987	May 26, 1987	September 30, 1990	No ambassador was appointed to replace Levin. The U.S. was represented by a succession of chargés d'affaires.
Derek Mitchell – Career FSO	Ambassador Extraordinary and Plenipotentiary	July 5, 2012	July 11, 2012	March 14, 2016	
Scot Marciel – Career FSO	Ambassador Extraordinary and Plenipotentiary	March 2, 2016	April 27, 2016	May 15, 2020	
Thomas Vajda – Career FSO	Ambassador Extraordinary and Plenipotentiary	November 18, 2020	January 19, 2021	December 17, 2022	

== Chargés d'Affaires ==
- Franklin P. Huddle, Jr. (September 1990–September 1994)
- Marilyn Meyers (September 1994–October 1996)
- Kent M. Wiedemann (October 1996–May 1999)
- Priscilla A. Clapp (July 1999–August 2002)
- Carmen Maria Martinez (August 2002–August 2005)
- Shari Villarosa (August 2005–September 2008)
- Larry M. Dinger (September 9, 2008–August 2011)
- Michael Thurston (August 2011–July 11, 2012)
- Deb Lynn (December 17, 2022 – July 10, 2023)
- Susan N. Stevenson (July 10, 2023 – January 14, 2026)
- Douglas Sonnek (January 15, 2026 – Present)

== Uncompleted appointments ==
- Frederick Vreeland was nominated to the ambassadorial post by President George H. W. Bush in 1990, but the Senate declined to act on the nomination.
- Parker W. Borg was nominated by President George H. W. Bush on July 22, 1991, but the Senate declined to act on the nomination.
- Michael J. Green was nominated by President George W. Bush in 2008 to fulfill a special envoy position delegated by the Tom Lantos Block Burmese JADE Act of 2008, but the nomination was not voted on by the end of the Bush Administration.

== See also ==
- Burma – United States relations
- Foreign relations of Burma
- Ambassadors of the United States
