= G. Edward Clark =

American diplomat

Gilbert Edward Clark (1917–1984) was an American Career Foreign Service Officer who was Ambassador Extraordinary and Plenipotentiary to Mali (1968–1970) and concurrent appointments as Ambassador Extraordinary and Plenipotentiary to Senegal and The Gambia (1970–1973).
