= Derek J. Mitchell =

American diplomat (born 1964)

Derek Mitchell
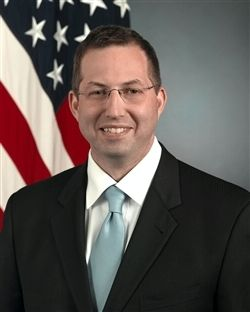

United States Ambassador to Myanmar
- In office July 11, 2012 – March 14, 2016
- President: Barack Obama
- Preceded by: Michael Thurston (Acting)
- Succeeded by: Scot Marciel

Personal details
- Born: September 16, 1964 (age 62) Atlanta, Georgia, U.S.
- Spouse: Min Lee (m. 2006)
- Education: University of Virginia (BA); Tufts University (MA)

Derek James Mitchell (born September 16, 1964) is an American diplomat with extensive experience in Asia policy. He was appointed by President Barack Obama as the first special representative and policy coordinator for Burma with rank of ambassador, and was sworn in by Secretary of State Hillary Clinton on October 2, 2011. On June 29, 2012, the U.S. Senate confirmed him as the new United States ambassador to Burma. On September 4, 2018, Mitchell succeeded Kenneth Wollack as president of the National Democratic Institute, a position he served until September 2023.

== Early life and education ==
Mitchell was born in Atlanta, Georgia, to Charlotte (née Mendelsohn) and Malcolm S. Mitchell, M.D., an academic medical oncologist and tumor immunologist, while his father was serving in the U.S. Public Health Service. His parents later settled in Orange, Connecticut, a suburb of New Haven, where he attended elementary, middle and high school. Mitchell graduated with a B.A. in foreign affairs, with a concentration in Soviet studies, from the University of Virginia in 1986. He attended the Fletcher School of Law and Diplomacy, Tufts University, Medford, Massachusetts, from 1989–1991, where he studied United States and East Asian diplomatic history and public international law, and was awarded a foreign language and area studies fellowship for the 1990-91 school year. He received a Master of Arts degree in law and diplomacy in 1991, earning a certificate for proficiency in Mandarin Chinese. From December 1988 to June 1989, he worked as copy editor at The China Post in Taipei, at the time the largest English-language daily newspaper on Taiwan, where he learned Mandarin Chinese, which he further studied at Nanjing University, in the summer of 1990.

He served as an aide to Senator Edward M. Kennedy from 1986 to 1988, working on foreign affairs as assistant to Senior Foreign Policy Adviser Gregory Craig, later White House Counsel under President Barack Obama. He also played piano at social events in and around Washington, including public and private functions for Senator Kennedy.

== Career ==
Mitchell worked as senior program officer for Asia (1993–1996) and the Former Soviet Union (1996–1997) at the National Democratic Institute for International Affairs, Washington, D.C. and developed their long-term programmatic approach to Asia. He conceived, organized, managed, and conducted training in democratic development programs in new and emerging democracies, including Armenia, Burma, Cambodia, Georgia, Pakistan, and Thailand. He also produced a 10-minute testimonial video on Aung San Suu Kyi for the institute's 1996 W. Averell Harriman Democracy Award luncheon, which honored the Burmese democracy leader. He conceived and directed the project, and interviewed her.

From 2001 to 2009 he was a senior fellow, director for Asia, and director of the Southeast Asia Initiative, at the Center for Strategic and International Studies, Washington, D.C., as part of the International Security Program. He conceived, developed, and implemented a wide variety of programs related to U.S.-Asia and Asian intra-regional affairs, and managed a highly active team of scholars. He established the center's first dedicated Southeast Asian studies program, and in 2008-2009 led a major study on the future of U.S. relations with regional allies (Thailand, Philippines) and other emerging partners (Indonesia, Malaysia, Singapore, Vietnam). It was his recommendations in a Foreign Affairs article co-authored with Michael Green (2007) that led to a new policy towards Burma and ultimately to the position he now holds. During this time, Mitchell was a visiting scholar (April to June 2007) at Peking University, School of International Studies, acting as a researcher and guest lecturer at China's premier academic institution.

Mitchell was appointed Principal Deputy Assistant Secretary of Defense for Asian and Pacific Security Affairs in the Office of the United States Secretary of Defense by President Obama, serving from 2009 to 2011. His duties included performing as second-in-command to the Assistant Secretary of Defense, responsible for Asia defense policy and more than 100 personnel encompassing three areas: East Asia, South and Southeast Asia, and Afghanistan/Pakistan/Central Asia. He also served as Acting Assistant Secretary of Defense in his absence, and when the position was vacant for several months in 2011. Mitchell helped to shape and guide the direction of U.S. defense policy in Asia through regular contact with Secretary of Defense, Undersecretary of Defense for Policy, and senior-level dialogues with inter-agency colleagues. Mitchell was the primary author of the Department of Defense's East Asia Strategy Report (1998), still the latest such report (as of 2011). He also led the conduct of public outreach and drafted speeches outlining the Department of Defense's strategic approach to East, Southeast and South Asia. He traveled extensively in Southeast Asia, including China, Japan, Thailand, Viet Nam and Cambodia.

On April 14, 2011 President Obama appointed Mitchell to be the first U.S. Special Representative and Policy Coordinator for Burma, with the rank of ambassador. He was charged with negotiating directly with the leaders of a regime that has been in power for over 40 years and was known for its repressive policies towards its own people, causing the United States to institute sanctions on the country. After his appointment Mitchell renewed his friendship with Aung San Suu Kyi, met with leaders in the government, and toured the country, at a time when a possible “thaw” in the relationship of the two countries was noted, with the release of a number of political prisoners in the fall of 2011.

On January 13, 2012, Secretary of State Hillary Clinton announced that "at the direction of President Obama, we will start the process of exchanging ambassadors with Burma". On April 5, 2012, Foreign Policy magazine cited sources indicating that the Obama administration would nominate Mitchell as United States Ambassador to Burma. On May 17, 2012, President Obama officially nominated him as the first United States ambassador to Burma since 1990, and the first non-career foreign service officer to hold that post. He was confirmed to the position by the U.S. Senate on June 29, 2012.

In 2016 Mitchell joined Albright Stonebridge Group as a Senior Advisor.

From 2018 to 2023, Mitchell served as president of the National Democratic Institute. On August 10, 2020, Mitchell, along with 10 other U.S. individuals, was sanctioned by the Chinese government for "behaving badly on Hong Kong-related issues".

== Political activities ==
Mitchell was active in the Democratic Party, working in California in 1988 (Dukakis/Bentsen), where he was personnel director for field operations, managing more than 500 grass-roots organizers for first field operation ever organized in California for a presidential campaign. In 1992 he was logistics and operations manager of the United Democratic Campaign (Clinton-Gore, Boxer, Feinstein) in California, for the field program that had 20 offices from San Luis Obispo to San Diego.

== Personal life ==
Mitchell has been married to Min Lee, a TV journalist from Taiwan, since April 30, 2006.

== Publications ==
=== Books/chapters ===
- Co-author (with C. Fred Bergsten, Bates Gill, and Nicholas Lardy), China: The Balance Sheet – What The World Needs To Know Now About the Emerging Superpower, Public Affairs, 2006. Author of chapter entitled “China’s Foreign and Security Policy: Partner or Rival?”
- Co-editor (with C. Fred Bergsten, Bates Gill, and Nicholas Lardy), The China Balance Sheet in 2007 and Beyond, Center for Strategic and International Studies and the Petersen Institute for International Economics, 2007. Author of three chapters: “China and the Developing World,” “China and Russia,” and “China and India” (with Chietigj Bajpaee).
- Co-editor (with Joshua Eisenman and Eric Heginbotham), China and the Developing World: Beijing's Strategy for the 21st Century, ME Sharpe, 2007. Author (with Carola McGiffert) of opening chapter, “Expanding the ‘Strategic Periphery’: A History of China's Interaction with the Developing World.”
- Co-author (with C. Fred Bergsten, Charles W. Freeman III, and Nicholas Lardy), China’s Rise: Challenges and Opportunities, Petersen Institute for International Economics Press, 2008. Author of three chapters: “Why Does the United States Care About Taiwan,” “China’s Military Modernization,” and “China and the World.”
- China: The Balance Sheet: What the World Needs to Know Now about the Emerging Superpower (PublicAffairs, 2006), co-authored with C. Fred Bergsten, Nicholas R. Lardy, and Bates Gill

=== Articles ===
- “Crisis in the Taiwan Strait?” (with Kurt M. Campbell), Foreign Affairs, July/August 2001.
- “Asia’s Forgotten Crisis: A New Approach to Burma” (with Michael J. Green), Foreign Affairs, November/December 2007.

Diplomatic posts
Preceded by Michael Thurston; Acting	United States Ambassador to Myanmar; 2012–2016	Succeeded by Scot Marciel
