= Sandra Poncet =

French economist

- Born: 16 August 1974 (age 52)
- Education: University of Auvergne (Clermont-Ferrand)
- Known for: Empirical analysis of the economy of China, trade and economic geography
- Awards: Member, Institut Universitaire de France (2013)
- Scientific career
- Fields: Economics
- Workplaces: University of Paris 1 Panthéon-Sorbonne; Paris School of Economics; CEPII
- Thesis: (2003)

Sandra Poncet (born 16 August 1974) is a French economist. She is a professor of economics at the University of Paris 1 Panthéon-Sorbonne and at the Paris School of Economics, and an associate researcher at the CEPII (Centre d'études prospectives et d'informations internationales). Her research applies empirical methods to questions of economic development in a context of globalization, with a particular focus on the economy of China. She is among the most quoted female economists in France according to the IDEAS ranking and has an h-index of 37.

== Education and career ==
Poncet received her doctorate in economics from the University of Auvergne in Clermont-Ferrand in 2003, where she carried out her research at the Centre d'études et de recherches sur le développement international (CERDI). She also holds the agrégation for higher education in economics (agrégée du supérieur).

Early in her career she held a research fellowship at CERDI and a temporary teaching and research post (ATER) at Paris 13 University. She then became an associate professor (maître de conférences) at the University of Paris 1 before being appointed full professor at Paris 11 University. Since 2011 she has been professor of economics at the University of Paris 1 Panthéon-Sorbonne, where she teaches development economics and the economics of emerging countries. She has been a scientific adviser at CEPII since 2005.

Poncet has held visiting positions at Galatasaray University in Istanbul (2005) and at the University of Michigan (2007). In 2013 she was named a junior member of the Institut Universitaire de France. She is a research affiliate of the Centre for Economic Policy Research (CEPR).

== Research ==
Poncet's research centres on international trade, economic geography and development economics, with much of her empirical work applied to the economy of China. Recurring themes in her work include the fragmentation and integration of China's domestic market, the determinants of regional and firm-level export performance, foreign direct investment and financial constraints, economic geography and wages, and the trade effects of corporate social responsibility and labour standards.

Her work has appeared in academic journals including the Journal of International Economics, the Journal of Development Economics, the Review of Economics and Statistics, World Development and The World Bank Economic Review. She is a co-editor of the China Economic Review and a member of the scientific committee of the Revue économique.

== Selected publications ==
- Koenig, Pamina; Poncet, Sandra (2022). "The effects of the Rana Plaza collapse on the sourcing choices of French importers". Journal of International Economics. 137: 103576.
- Emlinger, Charlotte; Poncet, Sandra (2018). "With a little help from my friends: Multinational retailers and China's consumer market penetration". Journal of International Economics. 112: 1–12.
- Mayneris, Florian; Poncet, Sandra; Zhang, Tao (2018). "Improving or disappearing: Firm-level adjustments to minimum wages in China". Journal of Development Economics. 135: 20–40.
- Hering, Laura; Poncet, Sandra (2014). "Environmental policy and exports: Evidence from Chinese cities". Journal of Environmental Economics and Management. 68 (2): 296–318.
- Hering, Laura; Poncet, Sandra (2010). "Market access impact on individual wages: Evidence from China". Review of Economics and Statistics. 92 (1): 145–159.
- Poncet, Sandra (2005). "A fragmented China: Measure and determinants of China's domestic market disintegration". Review of International Economics. 13 (3): 409–430.
- Poncet, Sandra (2003). "Measuring Chinese domestic and international integration". China Economic Review. 14 (1): 1–22.
