= Mary E. Lovely =

American economist (born 1956)

- Born: July 28, 1956 (age 70)
- Years active: 1990-present
- Spouse: John McHenry Yinger

Academic background
- Education: University of Michigan; Harvard University; Brandeis University
- Doctoral advisor: Roger H. Gordon
- Website: Syracuse Maxwell Website

Mary Elizabeth Lovely (born 1956) is a professor emeritus of economics at the Maxwell School of Citizenship and Public Affairs of Syracuse University. She is a senior fellow of the Peterson Institute for International Economics in Washington, D.C. Lovely often appears on national media as an expert on China-US trade, international economic integration, and public economics.

== Education ==
Lovely graduated with a BA degree from Brandeis University in 1978. She earned a master's degree in city and regional planning from Harvard University in 1980. In 1989, she completed her PhD at University of Michigan with Roger H. Gordon. Her thesis was titled Taxes, Trade, and the Pattern of World Production. She worked at the Metropolitan Studies Program (now the Center for Policy Research) at Syracuse University during her PhD years.

== Career ==
Lovely began her career as a research associate at Charles River Associates in Boston where she worked from 1980 to 1983. In 1989, She joined the Maxwell School of Citizenship and Public Affairs at Syracuse University as an associate professor. She was named the Melvin A. Eggers Faculty Scholar and Professor of Economics in 2010. She held an adjunct position at Columbia University in 2013.

Lovely's early research focused on effects of increased international trade on labor market, the distributional effects of industrial policy, the geographic concentration of exporting firms, and the welfare effects of smuggling.

Lovely has served as a nonresident senior fellow at the Peterson Institute for International Economics since 2017.

She was the co-editor for the China Economic Review journal from 2011 to 2015.

In January 2022, Lovely began serving as LoC Chair in U.S.-China Relations with the John W. Kluge Center at the Library of Congress in Washington D.C.

== Works ==
Lovely has authored over 200 articles, papers, and reports and has written or edited multiple books.

- Lovely, Mary E. (2017). International economic integration and domestic performance. World Scientific Studies in International Economics. Vol. 58. New Jersey: World Scientific. doi:10.1142/10062. ISBN 9789813141087.

== See also ==
- Nicholas R. Lardy
