= Yohannes Abraham =

American government official and diplomat

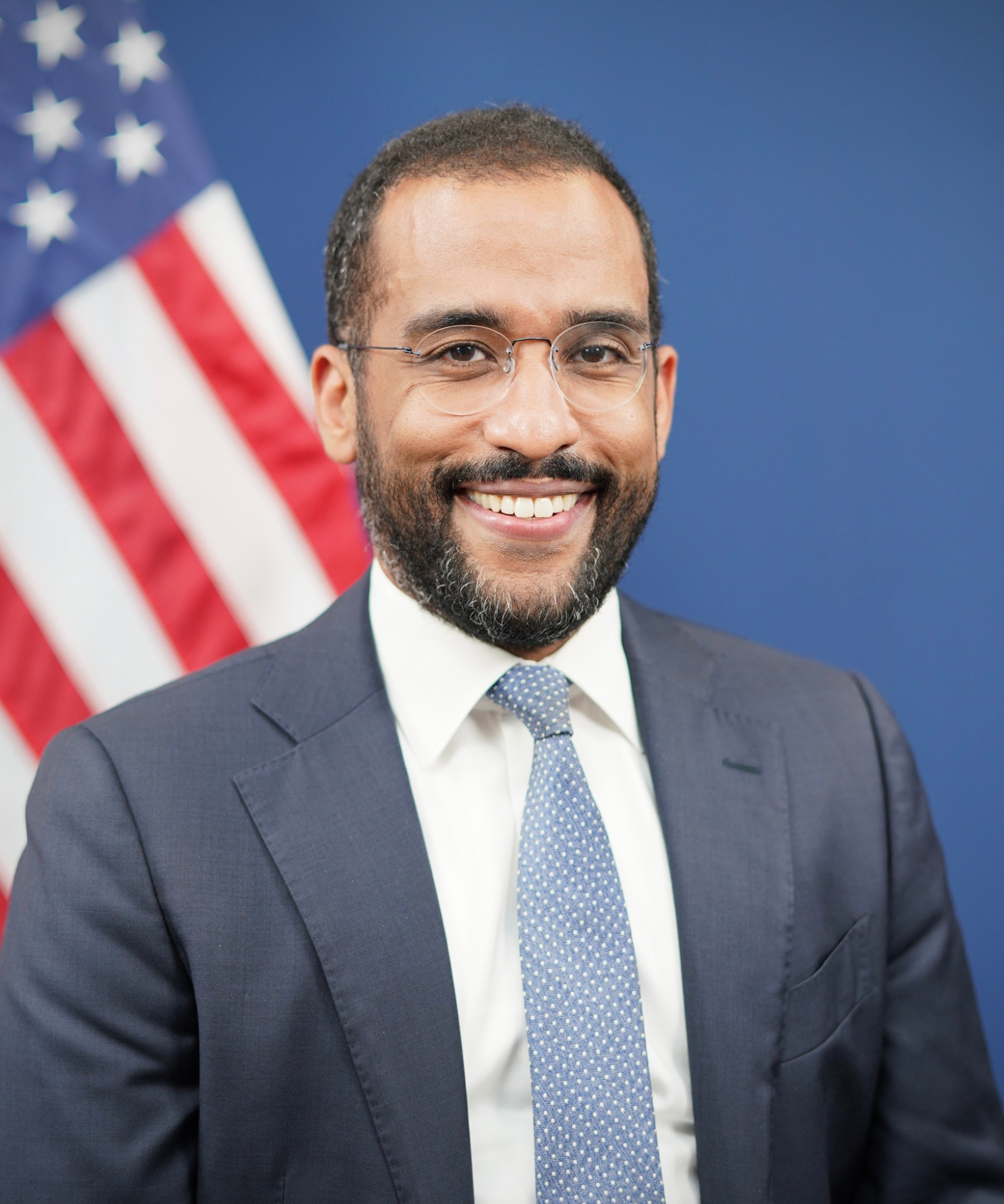

United States Ambassador to Association of Southeast Asian Nations
- In office October 5, 2022 – August 27, 2024
- President: Joe Biden
- Preceded by: Nina Hachigian (2017)
- Succeeded by: Yeouk Kevin Kim

Personal details
- Born: Virginia, United States
- Party: Democratic
- Education: Yale University (BA); Harvard University (MBA)

Yohannes Abraham is an American diplomat, government official, and executive who served as United States Representative to the Association of Southeast Asian Nations from 2022 to 2024. Prior to being Ambassador to ASEAN, Abraham served as chief of staff and executive secretary of the National Security Council. He was previously a longtime aide to President Barack Obama, including serving as senior advisor and chief operating officer of the Obama Foundation, before serving as executive director of Joseph R. Biden's presidential transition and being selected to lead the planned presidential transition for Democratic presidential nominee Kamala Harris.

== Early life and education ==
Abraham was born in Virginia to immigrant Ethiopian parents and raised in Springfield, Virginia. He graduated from Westminster School in Annandale, Virginia, and graduated from Thomas Jefferson High School for Science and Technology in Fairfax County, Virginia. He received a BA in political science from Yale College in 2007 and an MBA from Harvard Business School, where he graduated with high distinction as a Baker Scholar in 2019. While in business school, Abraham was also selected as a residential fellow at the Harvard Institute of Politics.

== Career ==
=== Obama campaigns and administration ===
Immediately after graduating from college in 2007, Abraham went to work for the Obama '08 campaign in Iowa. After the Obama's victory in the Iowa caucuses, Abraham worked for the campaign in other states, eventually being named field director for his home state of Virginia. During Obama's 2012 run for reelection, Abraham served as the campaign's deputy national political director.

During the Obama administration, Abraham served as deputy assistant to the president for the Office of Public Engagement, and senior advisor to the National Economic Council. He served as chief of staff for the Office of Public Engagement and Intergovernmental Affairs, reporting to Valerie Jarrett.

=== Post-Obama administration ===
Immediately following the Obama administration, Abraham joined the Obama Foundation as Senior Advisor and Chief Operating Officer. Abraham also worked with Vanguard Group's global investment unit, and taught at the Harvard Kennedy School of Government. In October 2017, Abraham was elected as an at-large member of the Democratic National Committee and appointed to the rules and bylaws committee.

=== Biden administration ===
Abraham was executive director of the Biden-Harris transition, where he oversaw day-to-day operations as well as the national security, economic, and domestic policy and personnel teams. Abraham was noted for his management of the transition, which received bipartisan praise and which the non-partisan Partnership for Public Service called "one of the most well-planned presidential transitions in history." At the start of the Biden administration, Abraham served as chief of staff and executive secretary of the National Security Council, where he oversaw the White House Situation Room and the NSC's budget, personnel, legislative, and public diplomacy teams.

==== Ambassador to Association of Southeast Asian Nations ====
External videos
- Announcement by Biden of Abraham's nomination, May 13, 2022, C-SPAN

On May 13, 2022, President Joe Biden announced his intent to nominate Abraham to be the representative to the Association of Southeast Asian Nations. Hearings on his nomination were held before the Senate Foreign Relations Committee on July 13, 2022. The committee favorably reported his nomination to the Senate floor on August 3, 2022. Abraham was confirmed on August 4, 2022 via voice vote. He presented his credentials to the secretary-general of ASEAN Lim Jock Hoi on October 5, 2022. During his tenure, the U.S. and ASEAN negotiated a Comprehensive Strategic Partnership and then-Secretary of State Antony Blinken referred to Abraham as "one of our best" ambassadors in July 2024.

=== Post-Biden administration ===
In August 2024, it was reported that Abraham would lead Kamala Harris's planned presidential transition. The organization was described as a "tight ship" and a "meticulous operation".

In October 2025, Yale University's Tobin Center for Economic Policy announced Abraham as a Distinguished Policy Fellow. As of 2025, he was also the Compton Visiting Professor in World Politics at the University of Virginia.

In November 2025, Abraham was appointed co-chair of Abigail Spanberger's gubernatorial transition team.
