= Jerry A. Hausman =

American economist

- Born: May 5, 1946 (age 80); Weirton, West Virginia, U.S.

Academic background
- Education: Nuffield College, Oxford (Ph.D.); Brown University (B.A.)
- Doctoral advisor: James Mirrlees; John Stanton Flemming

Academic work
- Discipline: Econometrics
- Institutions: MIT
- Doctoral students: Halbert White; Roger H. Gordon; Whitney K. Newey; Andrew Lo; Jeffrey R. Kling; Yacine Ait-Sahalia
- Notable ideas: Hausman specification test
- Awards: John Bates Clark Medal (1985); Frisch Medal (1980)
- Website: Information at IDEAS / RePEc

Jerry Allen Hausman (born May 5, 1946) is the John and Jennie S. MacDonald Professor of Economics at the Massachusetts Institute of Technology and a notable econometrician. He has published numerous influential papers in microeconometrics. Hausman is the recipient of several prestigious awards including the John Bates Clark Medal in 1985 and the Frisch Medal in 1980.

He is perhaps most well known for his development of the Durbin–Wu–Hausman test.

He has done extensive work in the field of telecommunications, and is also recognized as an expert on antitrust and mergers, public finance and taxation, and regulation. Hausman also serves as the director of the MIT Telecommunications Economics Research Program.

His recent applied papers are on topics including the effect of new goods on economic welfare and their measurement in the CPI, new telecommunications technologies including cellular 3G and broadband, regulation of telecommunications and railroads, and competition in network markets. His recent econometrics papers include estimation of difference in difference models, semi-parametric duration models, mixed logit model, weak instruments, and errors in variables in non-standard situations.

Hausman received his B.A. from Brown University summa cum laude in 1968, and his Ph.D. from Nuffield College, Oxford University, where he was a Marshall Scholar, in 1973, with thesis titled Theoretical and empirical aspects of vintage capital models.

== Selected publications ==
- ———; Griliches, Zvi (1986). "Errors in Variables in Panel Data" (PDF). Journal of Econometrics. 31 (1): 93–118. doi:10.1016/0304-4076(86)90058-8. S2CID 86867575.
- ———; McFadden, Daniel (1984). "Specification Tests for the Multinomial Logit Model". Econometrica. 52 (5): 1219–1240. doi:10.2307/1910997. hdl:1721.1/64213. JSTOR 1910997.
- ———; Taylor, William E. (1981). "Panel Data and Unobservable Individual Effects" (PDF). Econometrica. 49 (6): 1377–1398. doi:10.2307/1911406. hdl:1721.1/64044. JSTOR 1911406.
- ——— (1978). "Specification Tests in Econometrics" (PDF). Econometrica. 46 (6): 1251–1271. doi:10.2307/1913827. hdl:1721.1/64309. JSTOR 1913827.
