= Adam Posen =

American economist (born 1966)

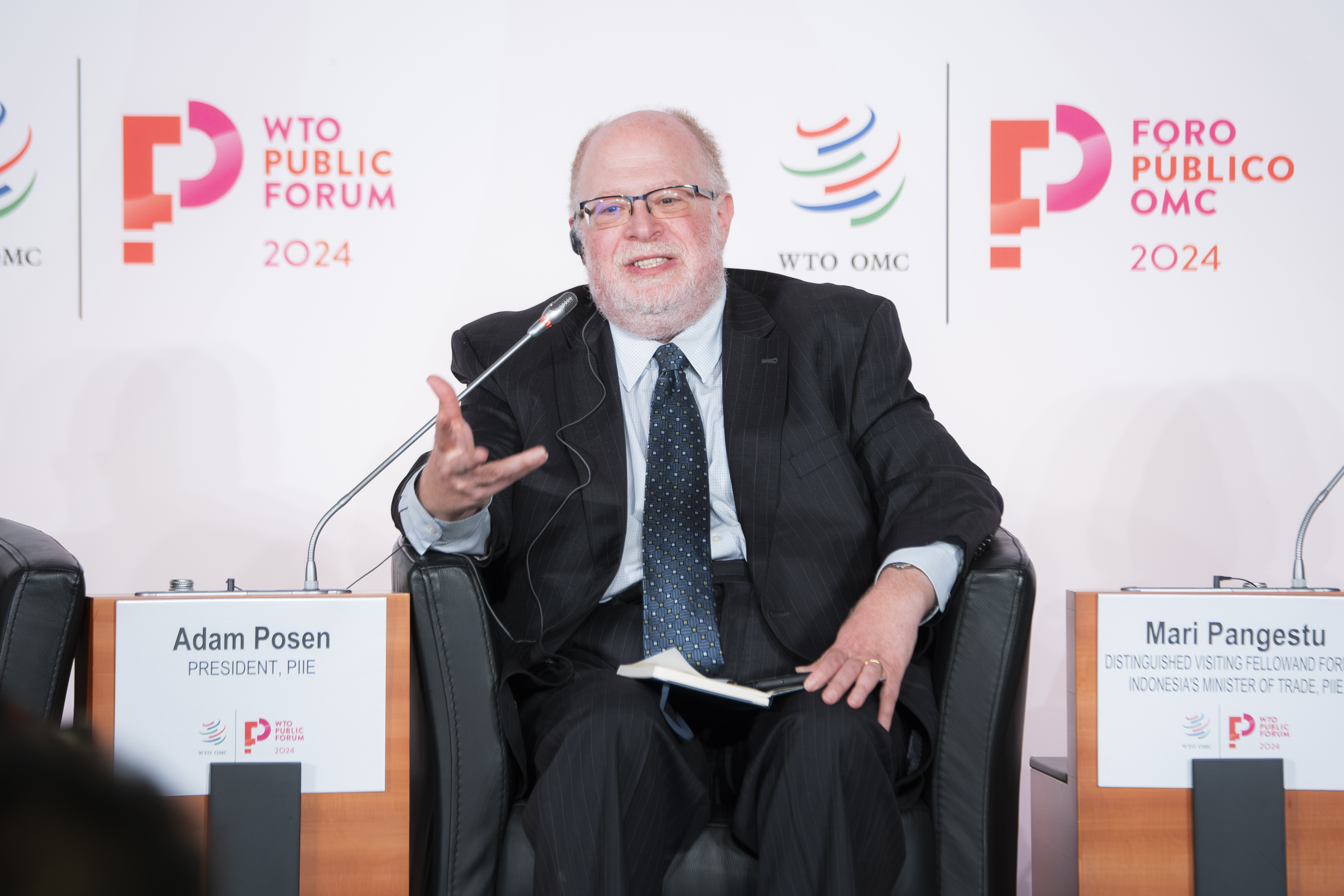
- Born: 1966 (age 59–60); Brookline, Massachusetts, U.S.
- Education: Harvard University (BA, MA, PhD)
- Title: President of the Peterson Institute for International Economics
- Website: piie.com/experts/senior-research-staff/adam-s-posen

Adam Simon Posen CBE (born 1966) is an American economist and President of the Peterson Institute for International Economics (PIIE). He became PIIE president on January 1, 2013, having first joined the Institute in July 1997.

== Life and career ==
Posen was born in Brookline, Massachusetts. He is Jewish. He received a PhD in Political Economy and Government from Harvard University, where he was a National Science Foundation (NSF) Graduate Fellow, after graduating from Harvard College in 1988.

His research focuses on macroeconomic policy in the industrial democracies, G-20 economic relations, the resolution of financial crises, and central banking issues. He has been a consultant to the IMF and to several US government agencies, as well as to the British and Japanese Cabinet Offices, and a visiting scholar at central banks in Europe and East Asia, and in the US Federal Reserve System. From 1994 to 1997, he was an economist in international research at the Federal Reserve Bank of New York and from 1993 to 1994 was Okun Memorial Fellow in Economic Studies at the Brookings Institution. He was a Bosch Foundation Fellow in Germany in 1992 to 1993, where he worked for the Bundesbank in Frankfurt and for Deutsche Bank in Berlin. He has also been a Public Policy Fellow at the American Academy in Berlin (2001). In 2006 he was a Houblon-Norman Senior Fellow at the Bank of England, on sabbatical from Peterson Institute for International Economics.

From September 1, 2009, to August 31, 2012, he was a voting External Member of the Monetary Policy Committee of the Bank of England, by appointment of the UK Chancellor of the Exchequer.

== Publications ==
His most cited publications include the books Restoring Japan's Economic Growth (1998) and Inflation Targeting: Lessons from the International Experience (1999, co-authored with Ben Bernanke, Thomas Laubach, and Frederic Mishkin), a series of articles on the political economy of central bank independence, and more recent works on the global roles of the dollar and the euro.
