= List of ambassadors of the United States to ASEAN =

Ambassador of the United States to the Association of Southeast Asian Nations
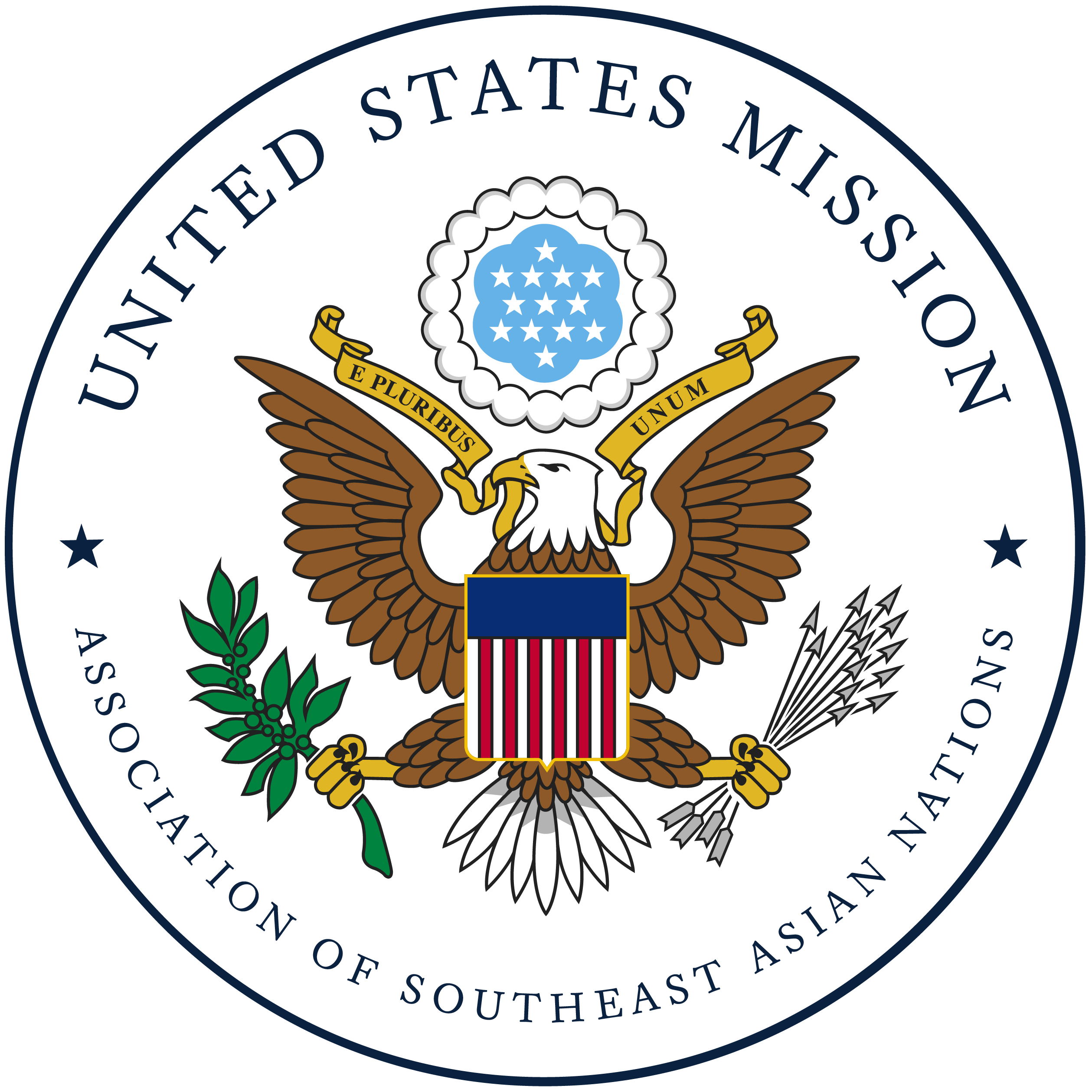
- Seal of the U.S. Mission to the Association of Southeast Asian Nations

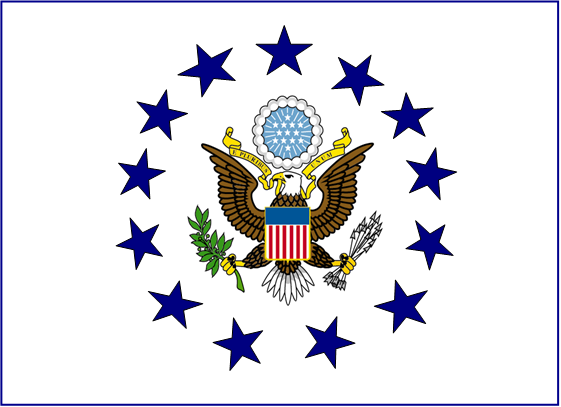
- Flag of a United States chief of mission

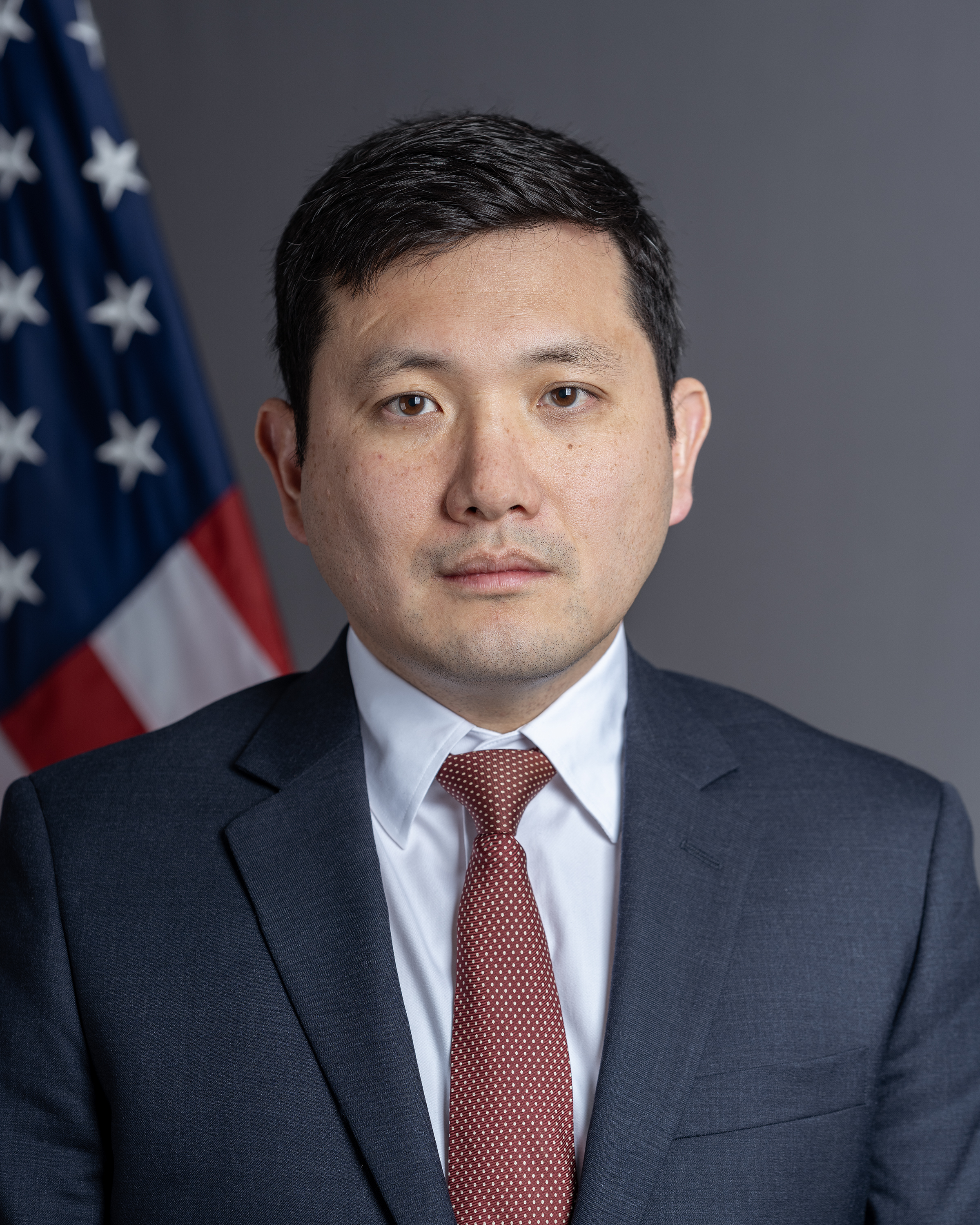
- Incumbent; Yeouk Kevin Kim since June 11, 2026
- Department of State
- Seat: Jakarta, Indonesia
- Nominator: The president
- Inaugural holder: Scot Marciel
- Website: asean.usmission.gov

This is a list of United States ambassadors to the Association of Southeast Asian Nations. The formal title of this position is Representative of the United States to the Association of Southeast Asian Nations, with the rank and status of Ambassador Extraordinary and Plenipotentiary.

- Scot Marciel (2008 – 2011)
- David L. Carden (2011 – 2013)
- Nina Hachigian (November 3, 2014 – January 20, 2017)
- Jane E. Bocklage (January 20 – May 2017, as Charge d'affaires)
- Daniel L. Shields (May – December 2017, as Charge d'affaires)
- Jane E. Bocklage (December 2017 – June 2018, as Charge d'affaires)
- Piper Anne Wind Campbell (June - December 2018, as Chargé d’affaires)
- Jane E. Bocklage (December 2018 – June 2019)
- James A. Caruso (June – August 2019)
- Melissa A. Brown (August 2019 – March 31, 2022, as Charge d'affaires)
- Kate Rebholz (March 31, 2022 – October 5, 2022, as Charge d'affaires)
- Yohannes Abraham (October 5, 2022 – August 27, 2024)
- Kate Rebholz (August 27, 2024 – July 16, 2025, as Charge d'affaires)
- Joy M. Sakurai (August 8, 2025 – June 9, 2026, as Charge d'affaires)
- Yeouk Kevin Kim (June 11, 2026 – Present)
