= Scot Marciel =

American diplomat and ambassador

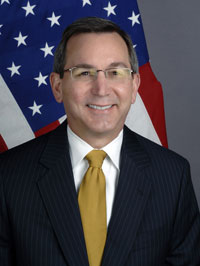

United States Ambassador to Myanmar
- In office April 27, 2016 – May 15, 2020
- President: Barack Obama; Donald Trump
- Preceded by: Derek Mitchell
- Succeeded by: Thomas Vajda

United States Ambassador to Indonesia
- In office September 21, 2010 – July 18, 2013
- President: Barack Obama
- Preceded by: Cameron Hume
- Succeeded by: Robert Blake

United States Ambassador to the Association of Southeast Asian Nations
- In office May 8, 2008 – September 21, 2010
- President: George W. Bush; Barack Obama
- Preceded by: Position established
- Succeeded by: David Carden

Personal details
- Born: Scot Alan Marciel; 1958 (age 67–68)
- Education: University of California, Davis; Tufts University

Scot Alan Marciel (born 1958) is an American diplomat and served as Principal Deputy Assistant Secretary in the Bureau of East Asian and Pacific Affairs until February 2016. He was confirmed by the U.S. Senate to be the United States Ambassador to Burma on January 28, 2016.

He was the United States Ambassador to Indonesia from August 2010 until July 2013. Marciel has worked for the United States Department of State since 1985. He has served in various capacities abroad and in particular was the United States Ambassador to the Association of Southeast Asian Nations prior to his nomination in Indonesia.

Marciel grew up in Fremont, California. He is a graduate of the University of California, Davis and the Fletcher School of Law and Diplomacy.

== Diplomatic career ==
Ambassador Marciel previously served as Deputy Assistant Secretary, East Asia and Pacific Bureau, responsible for relations with Southeast Asia, and as Ambassador for ASEAN Affairs.

Marciel, a career member of the Senior Foreign Service, joined the State Department in 1985. His assignments included Director of the Department's Office of Maritime Southeast Asia, Director of the Office of Mainland Southeast Asia, and Director of the Office of Southeastern Europe. He has served in Indonesia, Vietnam, the Philippines, Hong Kong, Brazil and Turkey, as well as in the Economic Bureau's Office of Monetary Affairs.

Diplomatic posts
New office	United States Ambassador to the Association of Southeast Asian Nations; 2008–2010	Succeeded by David Carden
Preceded by Cameron Hume	United States Ambassador to Indonesia; 2010–2013	Succeeded by Robert Blake
Preceded by Derek Mitchell	United States Ambassador to Myanmar; 2016–2020	Succeeded by Thomas Vajda
