= Nina Hachigian =

American politician and diplomat

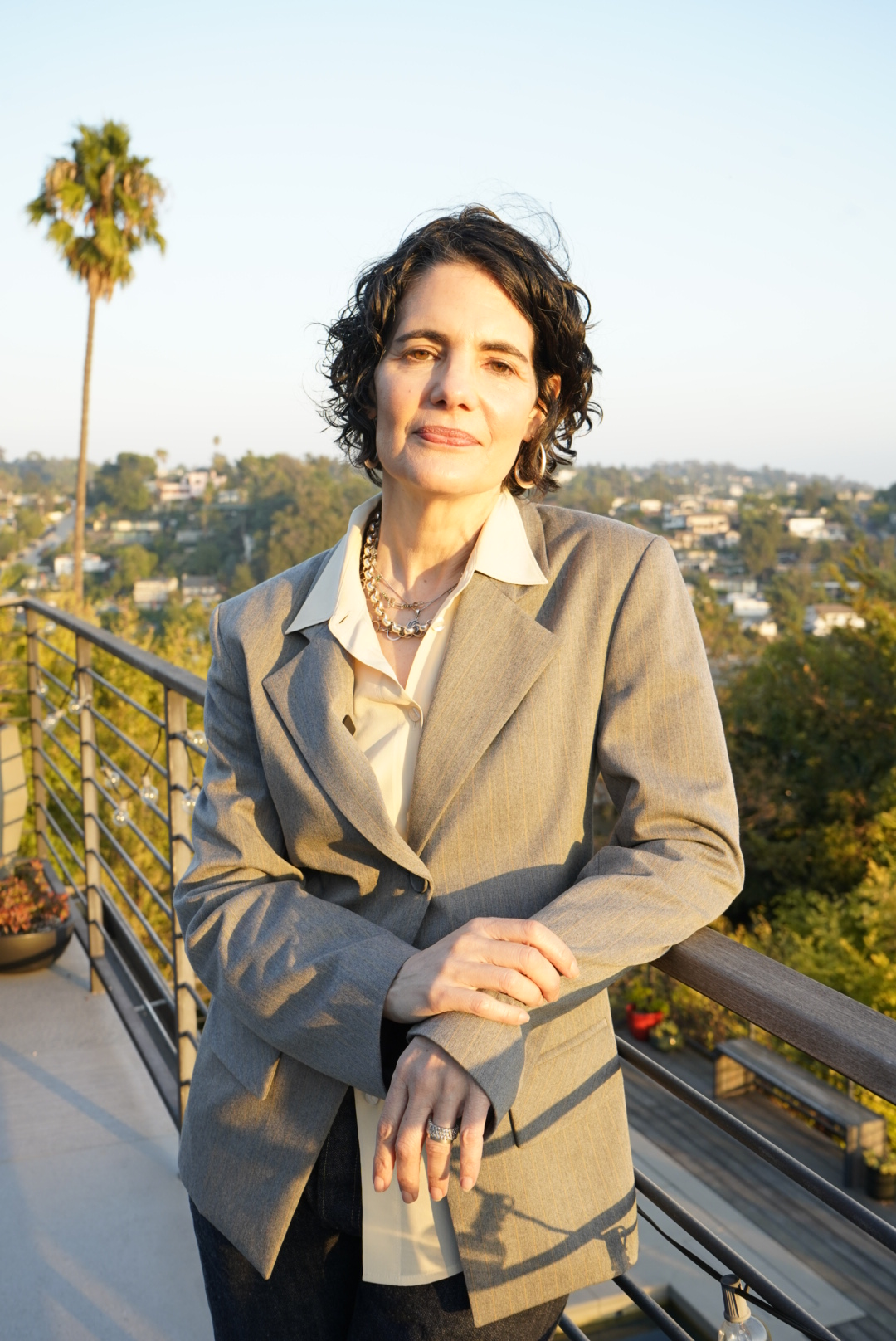

United States Ambassador to the Association of Southeast Asian Nations
- In office November 3, 2014 – January 20, 2017
- President: Barack Obama
- Preceded by: David Carden
- Succeeded by: Yohannes Abraham (2022)

Personal details
- Children: 2
- Education: Yale University; Stanford University

Nina Lucine Hachigian is the founder and CEO of the Alliance for Local Leaders International.

Previously, she served as an American diplomat who served as the first U.S. special representative for city and state diplomacy under Antony Blinken in the Biden administration. Before rejoining the State Department on October 3, 2022, she was the first Los Angeles Deputy Mayor of International Affairs, following her appointment by Eric Garcetti. Her office expanded LA's global ties to help bring jobs, culture, visitors, and the 2028 Olympic and Paralympic Games to the city.

Prior to this, Hachigian served as the United States representative to the Association of Southeast Asian Nations (ASEAN) with the rank of ambassador extraordinary and plenipotentiary.

== Education ==
Hachigian received a B.S. from Yale University, magna cum laude, and a J.D. from Stanford Law School, with distinction.

== Career ==
On October 30, 2025, Hachigian launched a nonpartisan nonprofit aimed at connecting US local leaders to their international counterparts with the goal of bringing in foreign direct investment and jobs, preparing for extreme weather events, and better understanding the usage of AI. The organization, the Alliance for Local Leaders International (ALLIES), is also interested in supporting city and state leaders as they navigate international relations.

Hachigian was appointed as the first U.S. Special Representative for City and State Diplomacy on October 3, 2022. The Special Representative for City and State Diplomacy and her team lead and coordinate the State Department’s engagement with mayors, governors and other local officials in the United States and around the world. The Special Representative aims to bring the benefits of U.S. foreign policy, such as jobs, investments, innovative solutions, and international experiences, to the local and state level. It supports U.S. national security priorities by integrating local ideas into foreign policy and fostering connections among cities, municipalities, and communities in the United States and abroad.

Prior to this, on August 4, 2017, Eric Garcetti announced the appointment of Hachigian as LA's Deputy Mayor for International Affairs.

From 2014 to 2017, Hachigian served as the second U.S. Ambassador to the Association of Southeast Asian Nations (ASEAN). During her tenure, the United States established a strategic partnership with ASEAN, held the first Leaders' Summit in the United States, launched a Presidential initiative on economic cooperation, established the U.S.-ASEAN Women's Leadership Academy and grew the youth program to over 100,000 members. She was awarded the State Department's Superior Honor Award for her service. She is also a founder of WASA, Women Ambassadors Serving America, a group of some 200 current and former Ambassadors.

Earlier, Hachigian was a senior fellow and a senior vice president at the Center for American Progress focused on Asia policy and U.S.-China relations. In 2012, she was the co-director of Asia policy for the Obama campaign. Prior to that, Hachigian was the director of the RAND Center for Asia Pacific Policy for four years. She served on the staff of the National Security Council in the Clinton White House from 1998-1999.

Hachigian was a founding member of the State Department's International Security Advisory Board. She is a board member of the Pacific Council on International Policy and a member of the Council on Foreign Relations. She is also a founder of the Leadership Council for Women in National Security (LC-WINS)

== Publications ==
=== Books ===
- The Next American Century: How the U.S. Can Thrive as Other Powers Rise, Simon & Schuster, 2008 (co-authored with Mona Sutphen)
- The Information Revolution in Asia, RAND Corporation, 2003 (co-authored with Lily Wu)

=== Edited Volumes ===
- Debating China: The U.S. – China Relationship in Ten Conversations, Oxford University Press, 2014

Hachigian also published numerous reports, book chapters, and articles in outlets including Foreign Affairs, The Washington Quarterly, Democracy, and Survival, as well as opinion pieces appearing in TIME, The New York Times, Los Angeles Times, and the South China Morning Post.

== Personal life ==
She lives in Los Angeles with her husband and children.

== Ambassadorship ==
Hachigian was sworn in as the United States Ambassador on September 19, 2014 and served until January 20, 2017. In her capacity as Chief of the U.S. Mission to ASEAN, she was responsible for working with ASEAN member states and other stakeholders to advance U.S. interests in a peaceful, prosperous, and integrated Southeast Asia that supports human dignity and a rules-based regional order. The Mission's five priorities in the U.S. relationship with ASEAN are supporting economic integration, expanding maritime cooperation, cultivating emerging leaders, promoting opportunity for women, and addressing transnational challenges. She oversaw the broadening engagement of the United States in Southeast Asia, which included the Obama Administration's 2011 "pivot" or "rebalance" to the region. Based in the U.S. Mission to ASEAN in Jakarta, Indonesia, she traveled throughout ASEAN's 10 member states and Asia. Her responsibilities included supporting ASEAN as it moves toward economic integration in 2015 and advocating for the systemic changes necessary to promote peaceful and prosperous growth in the region.

Achievements during her term as ambassador include:

- YSEALI: In December 2013, President Obama launched the Young Southeast Asian Leader Initiative (YSEALI), a network for people-to-people ties that aims to improve U.S-ASEAN relations for generations to come. As of 2017, YSEALI has almost 100,000 members, ages 18–35, across all 10 ASEAN member states. The initiative provides training, fellowships, and funding opportunities to young leaders, and serves as a platform to address the region's key issue areas such as entrepreneurship, environmental protection, civic engagement, and education.
- Strategic Partnership: In November 2015, the leaders of the United States and ASEAN formally elevated their relationship to a Strategic Partnership. The U.S.-ASEAN partnership addresses shared challenges on a diverse range of issues - from combating terrorism and pandemic disease, to upholding international law and standards in the South China Sea and in cyberspace, to taking meaningful action on climate change, inclusive economic growth, and trafficking-in-persons. The United States is committed to the Asia-Pacific and to ASEAN as an essential pillar of the region.
- Sunnylands Summit: During the U.S.-ASEAN Summit in Kuala Lumpur in November 2015, President Obama invited leaders from 10 ASEAN member states to attend a special summit in the United States. The Summit, held in Sunnylands, California, on February 15–16, 2016, was the first-ever standalone U.S.-ASEAN summit, and marked a watershed year for both ASEAN and for the U.S.-ASEAN strategic partnership.
- U.S.-ASEAN Connect: U.S.-ASEAN Connect is a U.S. government initiative that was announced by President Obama at the U.S.-ASEAN Summit in Sunnylands, CA, in 2016. It aims to strengthen United States' economic engagement with ASEAN. Strong economic ties are at the core of the United States and ASEAN's decades-long partnership. ASEAN countries collectively comprise the fourth-largest trading partner for the United States. U.S.-ASEAN Connect aims to build on existing efforts to support ASEAN's economic integration, as a more integrated ASEAN will strengthen the region's rules-based, open economic order.
- U.S. Department of Defense Policy Board: On 29 January 2021, Hachigian along with Madeleine Albright and Henry Kissinger were appointed to the U.S. Department of Defense Policy Board.

Hachigian also co-founded WASA, Women Ambassadors Serving America, a group of over 170 current and former Ambassadors.
