= Thomas Vajda =

American diplomat

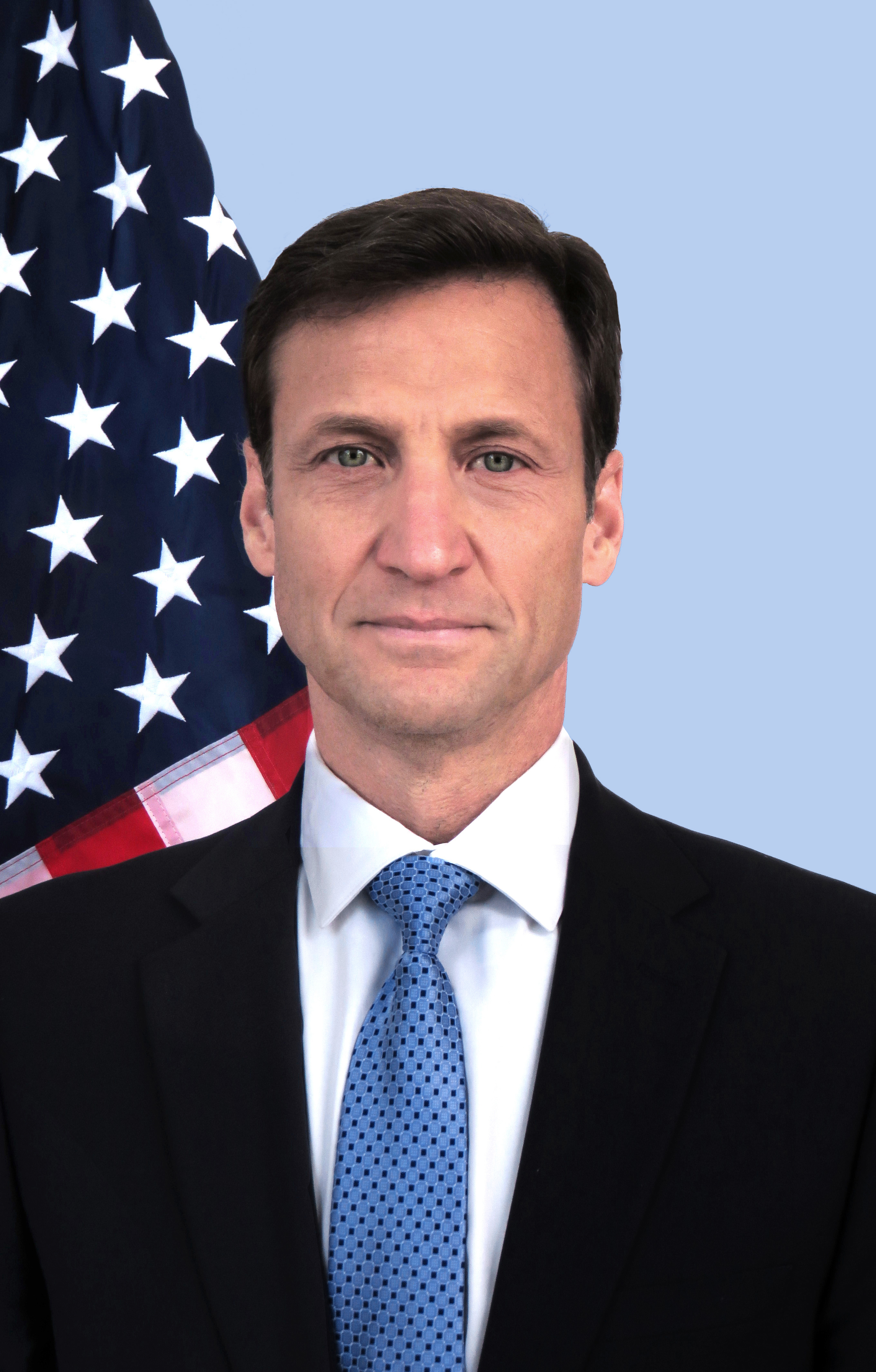

United States Ambassador to Myanmar
- In office January 19, 2021 – December 17, 2022
- President: Donald Trump; Joe Biden
- Preceded by: Scot Marciel

Personal details
- Children: 2
- Education: Stanford University (B.A); Fletcher School of Law and Diplomacy (M.A.)

Thomas Laszlo Vajda is an American diplomat who had served as the United States Ambassador to Myanmar between 2021-2022.

== Education ==
Vajda received a Bachelor of Arts from Stanford University in 1988 and a Master of Arts from the Fletcher School of Law and Diplomacy in 1991.

== Foreign Service career ==
Vajda joined the Foreign Service in 1991 and is a career member of the Senior Foreign Service with the rank of Minister Counselor. His previous postings included Deputy Chief of Mission in Rangoon, Myanmar, Director of the Middle East Partnership Initiative, and Deputy Coordinator for Assistance to the Middle East. From 2014–2017, he served as U.S. Consul General in Mumbai. From July 2017 to October 2018, he was Acting Deputy Assistant Secretary for South Asia. From October 2018 until July 2019, he served as Acting Deputy Assistant Secretary for Security and Transnational Affairs in the Bureau of South and Central Asian Affairs. From August 2019 to May 2020, he was the Deputy Assistant Secretary with responsibility for India, Bangladesh, Nepal, Sri Lanka, Bhutan, and Maldives. Other assignments include Deputy Office Director of the Office of Australian, New Zealand, and Pacific Island Affairs in the Bureau of East Asian and Pacific Affair, as a Political-Military Affairs Officer in the Office of Weapons Removal and Abatement, Bureau of Political-Military Affairs, and as Political/Economic Section Chief of the U.S. Embassy in Tirana, Albania. He was assigned as a Desk Officer in the Office of Japanese Affairs and prior to that as a Desk Officer in the Office of Korean Affairs. In 2020, he served as the senior advisor in the Bureau of South and Central Asian Affairs.

On May 4, 2020, his nomination to be United States Ambassador to Burma was sent to the Senate. On August 5, 2020, a hearing before the Senate Foreign Relations Committee was held on his nomination. On November 18, 2020, his nomination was confirmed in the United States Senate by voice vote. He was sworn in on December 16, 2020. He presented his credentials to president Win Myint on January 19, 2021.

== See also ==
- Ambassadors of the United States

Diplomatic posts
Preceded by Scot Marciel	United States Ambassador to Myanmar; 2021–2022	Vacant
