= China Economic Review =

English-language quarterly business and economic magazine

- Type: Business & Economics Magazine
- Owner(s): China Economic Review Publishing Ltd.
- Editor: Graham A. Earnshaw
- Founded: 1990
- Headquarters: The Plaza Building; London; SE13 5PT
- ISSN: 1350-6390
- Website: chinaeconomicreview.com

China Economic Review (Chinese: 中國經濟評論, Pinyin: Zhōngguó Jīngjì Pínglùn; CER) is an English-language quarterly (formerly monthly) business and economics magazine published by the UK-registered China Economic Review Publishing Ltd. The magazine was launched in London in 1990. Its main editorial office is in Hong Kong. The magazine's content focuses on China business news, opinion and analysis.

== Notable employees ==
- Bates Gill
- Anna Jones
- Chris Patten
- Jack Rodman

== Awards ==
Society of Publishers in Asia Awards (SOPA Awards):

- 2013 SOPA Awards: Honorable Mention for Excellence in Explanatory Reporting - "Awash in Cash"
- 2010 SOPA Awards: Honorable Mention for Excellence in Special Coverage - "Cleanup Job"
- 2008 SOPA Awards: Honorable Mention for Excellence in Business Reporting - "Starting Afresh"
- 2007 SOPA Awards: Excellence in Explanatory Reporting - "Mother of Invention"
