= Anna Gelpern =

Russian-American legal scholar

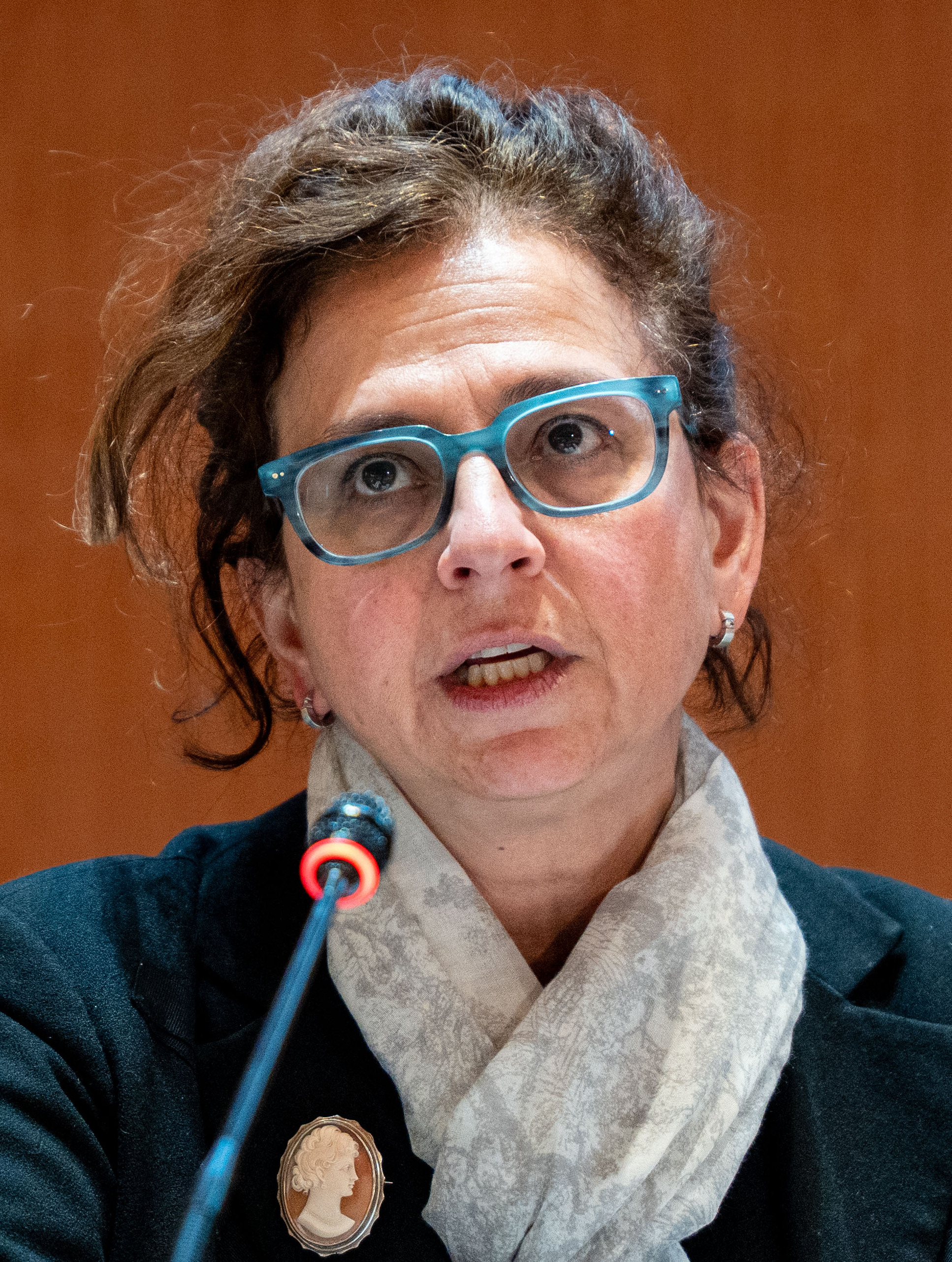
Anna Gelpern in 2025

Anna Gelpern is a legal scholar and expert on sovereign debt and financial regulation. She is Professor of Law and the Agnes N. Williams Research Professor at the Georgetown University Law Center, and a nonresident senior fellow at the Peterson Institute for International Economics.

== Biography ==
Gelpern was born in Leningrad, Soviet Union. In the early 1980s her family migrated to the United States where she became a citizen. She earned a Bachelor of Arts from Princeton University, a Juris Doctor from Harvard Law School, and a Master of Science from the London School of Economics and Political Science. She then practiced law with Cleary Gottlieb Steen & Hamilton in New York and London.

Between 1996 and 2002, she served in legal and policy positions at the US Treasury Department.

Following her time at the Treasury, Gelpern has taught at Rutgers Law School at Rutgers University–Newark, then at American University's Washington College of Law, and visiting appointments at Harvard Law School and University of Pennsylvania School of Law. She was also an International Affairs Fellow at the Council on Foreign Relations before joining the Peterson Institute for International Economics. She joined Georgetown Law in 2013.

== Scholarship and policy work ==
Together with Hal S. Scott, Gelpern is the coauthor of a leading textbook on international finance, originally published in 1995 and updated in 2018 for its 22nd edition.

She co-directs the Sovereign Debt Forum, a collaboration among Georgetown Law’s Institute of International Economic Law and academic institutions in the United States and Europe, dedicated to cutting-edge research and capacity building in sovereign debt management.

She has worked as an expert for the United Nations Conference on Trade and Development. In particular, she was involved in the drafting of the collective action clauses in Argentina's sovereign debt contracts.

She is frequently quoted in U.S. and international media on issues that issue sovereign debt restructuring and banking sector policy.
