= Anabel González =

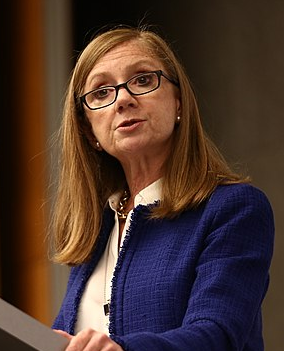

Vice President for Countries (IDB)
- Incumbent
- Assumed office September 1, 2023

Deputy Director-General, World Trade Organization (WTO)
- In office August 2021 – June 2023
- Preceded by: Alan Wolff
- Succeeded by: Johanna Hill

Personal details
- Born: 22 August 1963 (age 62)
- Citizenship: Costa Rican US
- Spouse: Francisco Chacón González
- Education: Universidad de Costa Rica Georgetown University

Anabel González (Costa Rica, 22 August 1963) is an economic development expert. She is currently Vice President for Countries at the Inter-American Development Bank (IDB).

== Education ==
Anabel González has a law degree from the University of Costa Rica and a master's degree in International Trade Law and Policy from Georgetown University (US). She has also completed specialized studies in international trade at the Center for Applied Studies in International Negotiations in Geneva and at Harvard University.

== Career ==
Between 2010 and 2014, González assumed the role of Minister of Trade of Costa Rica. She also held positions in the government of Costa Rica from 1991 to 2004, including Special Ambassador and Chief Negotiator (2002–2004), Vice Minister of Foreign Trade (1998–2001), and Director General of Trade Negotiations (1991–1997). During this period, she led the signing of the Free Trade Agreement between the United States, Central America and the Dominican Republic (CAFTA) and played an important role in Costa Rica's entry into the Organization for Economic Co-operation and Development (OECD). Additionally, she served as General Director of CINDE (a non-profit investment promotion agency) in 2001 and 2002.

From 2014 to 2018, she was a Senior Director of the World Bank's Global Practice on Trade & Competitiveness.

González also worked as Nonresident Senior Fellow at the Peterson Institute for International Economics in Washington DC, where she conducted research and published on trade policy and economic integration, also launching the "Trade Winds" virtual interview series. Simultaneously, she served as a senior advisor in the Global Advantage and Social Impact practices at Boston Consulting Group, assisting clients across the public and private sector around the world.

After this, she served as the Deputy Director General of the World Trade Organization (WTO), facilitating trade negotiations among the institution's country members, including trade-related aspects of the pandemic. Among the topics she oversaw were market access, intellectual property, government procurement and competition, trade in services and investment.

González was appointed vice president for Countries at the Inter-American Development Bank (IDB) in September 2023.

González has written in numerous publications on trade, investment, and economic development, including the WTO blog Trade Thoughts
