= Peterson Institute for International Economics =

American think tank

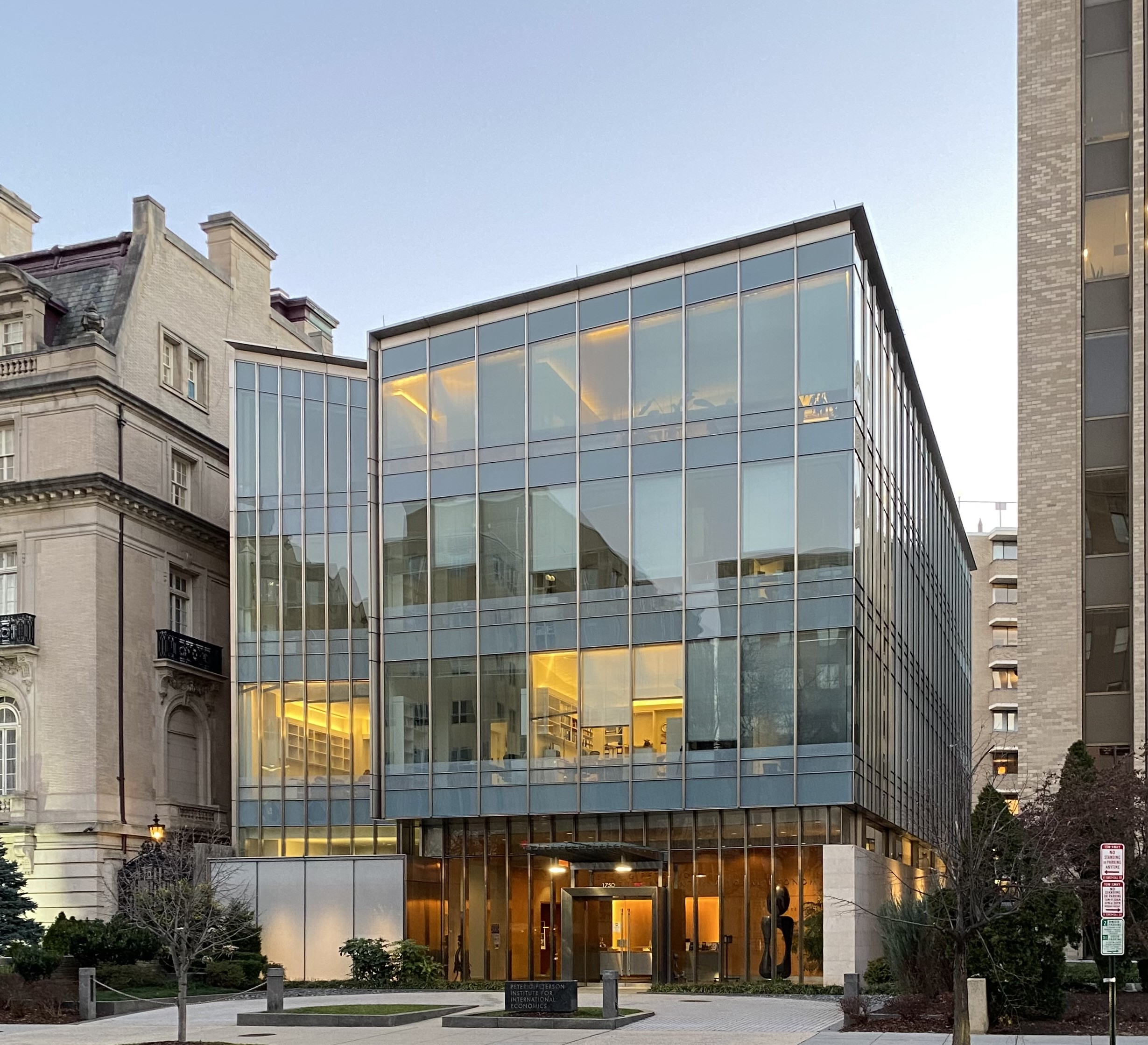
- Established: 1981; 45 years ago
- Founder: C. Fred Bergsten
- Type: 501(c)(3) organization
- Tax ID no.: 52-1226967
- Purpose: International Economics
- Headquarters: 1750 Massachusetts Avenue NW, Washington, D.C., U.S.
- Coordinates: 38.9083°N 77.0409°W
- President: Adam S. Posen
- Chairman: Michael A. Peterson
- Budget: Revenue: $8,980,271; Expenses: $14,090,558 (FYE June 2016)
- Staff: 60
- Website: www.piie.com
- Formerly called: Institute for International Economics

The Peterson Institute for International Economics (PIIE), known until 2006 as the Institute for International Economics (IIE), is an American think tank based in Washington, D.C. It was founded by C. Fred Bergsten in 1981 and has been led by Adam S. Posen since 2013. PIIE conducts research, provides policy recommendations, and publishes books and articles on a wide range of topics related to the US economy and international economics.

According to the 2015 Global Go To Think Tank Index Report (Think Tanks and Civil Societies Program, University of Pennsylvania), PIIE ranked number 20 (of 150) in the "Top Think Tanks Worldwide" and number 13 (of 60) in the "Top Think Tanks in the United States".

== History ==
PIIE's origin can be traced back to an urgent request sent to the German Marshall Fund from C. Fred Bergsten, then assistant secretary at the Treasury Department during the Carter administration, in 1980. It was initially met with some hesitation from GMF board members due to the long-term commitment and large amount of funding proposed, but with strong support and recommendation from then GMF president Frank Loy, a center "devoted to helping provide the needed thinking on international economic issues," as Bergsten wrote at the time, was founded.

During the 1970s, President Richard Nixon ended the link to the gold standard, the first oil shock occurred in 1973, and the first G5 summit convened. As a result, the new IIE sought to conduct policy-oriented research on international economic issues by bringing together experts, academics, and policymakers. The GMF committed an initial $4 million to the institute. The IIE's founding chairman was Peter G. Peterson, who had served on Nixon's Council on International Economic Policy and as Secretary of Commerce. Anthony M. Solomon (the Undersecretary of the Treasury for Monetary Affairs and President of the Federal Reserve Bank of New York) and Richard N. Cooper (a consultant to the U.S. National Security Council) also joined the IIE in the early 1980s.

Throughout the 1980s and 1990s, the IIE expanded to become one of the most internationally recognized think tanks in Washington D.C. The Ford Foundation was also a significant supporter of the IIE, having provided a major grant in 1991. In the 1990s, the IIE created a number of endowed chairs for its members: one in honor of Reginald Jones, the former CEO of General Electric, and another for Dennis Weatherstone, the former CEO of JP Morgan.

It moved from 11 Dupont Circle to its current building on Massachusetts Avenue in 2001. In 2006, a capital campaign led to the creation of a sizable endowment in order to celebrate the institute's 25th anniversary. Previously known as the Institute of International Economics, it changed its name that same year in recognition of Peter G. Peterson's role in the capital campaign and for his longstanding support of the institute since the early 1980s. A number of major economic figures attended its conference in New York City: Alan Greenspan, former Federal Reserve Board Chairman; Robert Rubin, former Secretary of the Treasury; Jean-Claude Trichet, Governor of the European Central Bank, among others.

Adam S. Posen succeeded Bergsten as president on January 1, 2013. Michael A. Peterson succeeded his father Peter G. Peterson as chairman in the spring of 2018. In 2019, PIIE's annual budget was about $12–13 million. It is financially supported by foundations, private corporations, and individuals, as well as earnings from its publications and capital fund.

== Notable scholars ==
Senior scholars at the Peterson Institute include (as of September 2021):

- Adam S. Posen, President
- C. Fred Bergsten, Nonresident Senior Fellow and Director Emeritus
- Olivier Blanchard, C. Fred Bergsten Senior Fellow
- Markus Brunnermeier, Nonresident Senior Fellow
- William R. Cline, Senior Fellow Emeritus
- José de Gregorio, Nonresident Senior Fellow
- Karen Dynan, Nonresident Senior Fellow
- Jason Furman, Nonresident Senior Fellow
- Anna Gelpern, Nonresident Senior Fellow
- Pinelopi Koujianou Goldberg, Nonresident Senior Fellow
- Anabel González, Nonresident Senior Fellow
- Patrick Honohan, Nonresident Senior Fellow
- Douglas Irwin, Nonresident Senior Fellow
- Nicholas R. Lardy, Nonresident Senior Fellow
- Robert Z. Lawrence, Nonresident Senior Fellow
- Mary E. Lovely, Senior Fellow
- Maurice Obstfeld, Nonresident Senior Fellow
- Jean Pisani-Ferry, Nonresident Senior Fellow
- Arvind Subramanian, Nonresident Senior Fellow
- Nicolas Véron, Senior Fellow
- Justin Wolfers, Nonresident Senior Fellow

Former scholars include Michael Mussa, Carmen Reinhart, Dani Rodrik, Edwin M. Truman, and John Williamson. The latter coined the term "Washington Consensus" while working at the institute.

== Areas of research ==
- "Debt and Development" – Corruption and Governance, Debt Relief, Foreign Aid/Technical Assistance, Technology and Developing Countries, Transition Economies, World Bank and Regional Development Banks.
- "Globalization" – Politics of Globalization, Globalization and Labor, Globalization and Environment, Migration, Issues and Impact.
- "International Finance/Macroeconomics" – Exchange Rate Regimes/Monetary Policy, Finance, Investment, and Debt, Global Financial Crises, International Monetary Fund, New Economy and Productivity, World Economy.
- "International Trade and Investment" – Agriculture, Competition Policy, Corporate Governance/Transparency, E-commerce and Technology, Economic Sanctions, Energy, Foreign Direct Investment, Intellectual Property Rights, Regional Trading Blocs, Services, Tax Policy, WTO and Other Global Institutions.
- "US Economic Policy" – Economic Sanctions, Foreign Aid/Technical Assistance, Trade Disputes, Trade Promotion Authority, US Monetary/Fiscal Policy, US Trade Policy.

=== 2017 tax reform debate ===
The Peterson Institute was at the forefront of research on the proposals by the first Trump Administration of reforming the tax code. Comparative analyses in advanced economies show the tax proposal will increase the budget deficit, unless coupled with a reduction of tax loopholes.

== Building ==
In 2001 the Peterson Institute moved into a building it commissioned and built at 1750 Massachusetts Avenue ("Embassy Row"), NW, Washington, D.C. It is located across from the main Brookings Institution building, diagonally across from the Carnegie Endowment for International Peace, and next to the Paul H. Nitze School of Advanced International Studies.

The building was designed by James von Klemperer from the architectural firm Kohn Pedersen Fox. Its state-of-the-art conference center is named in honor of the institute's founder, C. Fred Bergsten. The sculpture garden is named in honor of Institute benefactor Anthony M. Solomon. The building houses several pieces of art donated by Stephan Schmidheiny, a former director of the institute, including a sculpture by Joan Miró and a painting by Elizabeth Murray. It also houses collections of Chinese and African art donated by William M. Keck II, Ambassador John M. Yates, and Anthony M. Solomon.

The building was granted the Best Architecture for 2001 award by the Washington Business Journal and won a Best Design award from the American Institute of Architects in 2003. Former U.S. Deputy Secretary of the Treasury and Under Secretary of State Stuart Eizenstat opined that the Peterson Institute building "is to international economics what the House that Ruth Built Yankee Stadium was to baseball". A contemporary review by Washington Post architectural critic Benjamin Forgey observed that "this is a very pretty building, lovely to look at on its own," finding its proportions "satisfying" and its workmanship was "superb".

== Criticism ==
In an opinion piece for The New York Times published in 2016, Steven Rattner called the new building of the Peterson Institute "the locker room of the Team Globalization and Free Trade cheering squad". Rattner said that the United States should not close the borders or retreat from the world but that free trade has winners and losers, and "we need to be more sensitive to the losers and try to help", for example by redistribution of income through the tax system, which he said the United States has not been doing. He argued that Ross Perot was right when he said that the North American Free Trade Agreement would transfer American jobs to Mexico, particularly in manufacturing. From 2009 to 2013, employment in the American auto manufacturing sector rose by 23%, from 560,000 to 690,000, while employment in the Mexican auto sector rose from 368,000 to 589,000, or 60%. He wrote: "I'm happy that 221,000 more Mexicans got jobs, but lets be honest: Absent open borders, many of those jobs would have been in America." He concluded by observing that wages in American auto manufacturing were down by 12.7%, and that American auto manufacturing compensation was $35.67 an hour, while it was $6.36 an hour in Mexico. Adam Posen, then the Peterson Institute's director, responded that "fetishization" of any industry was "immoral".
