= David L. Carden =

American lawyer

The Honorable David L. Carden
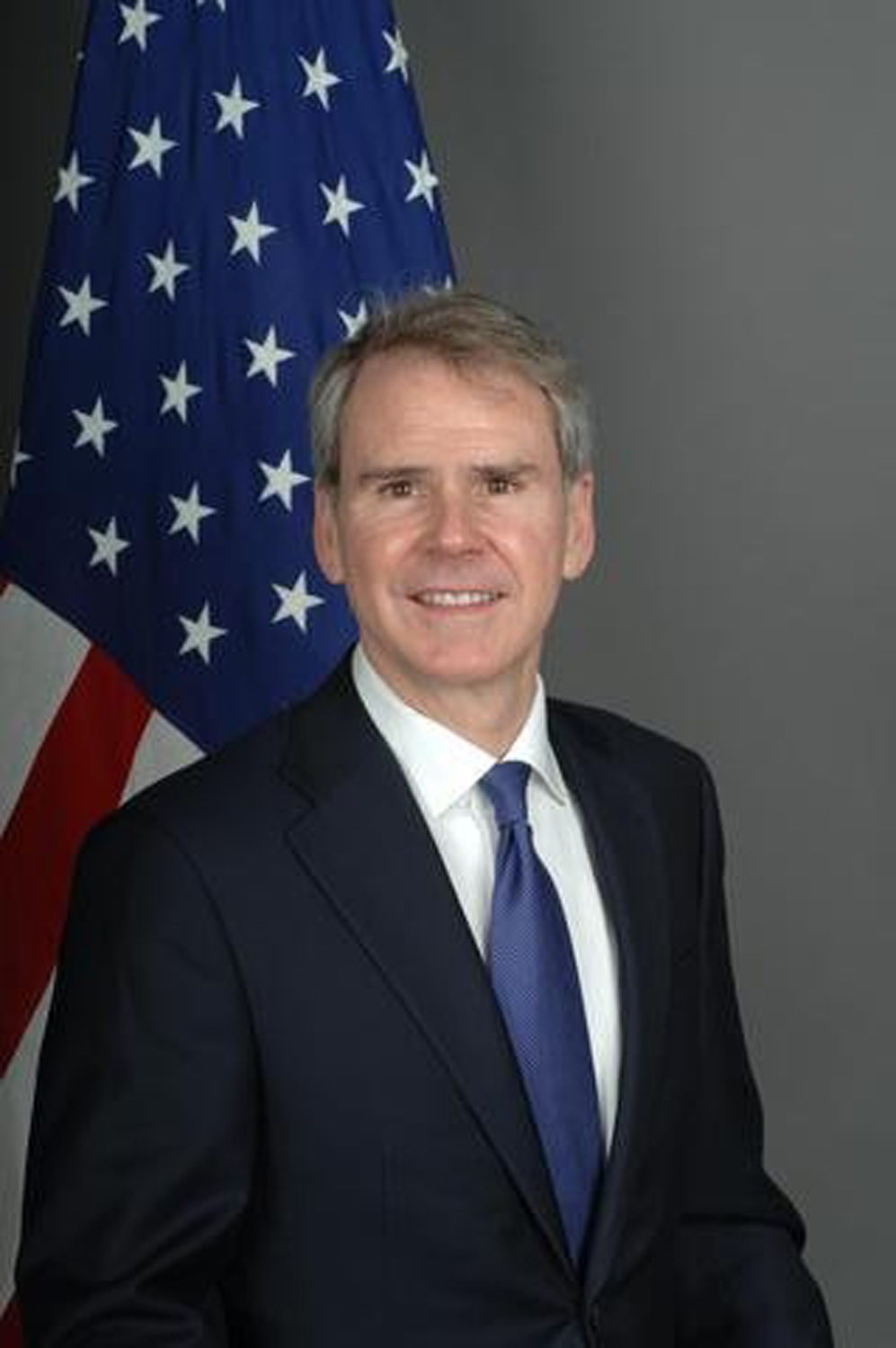

United States Ambassador to the Association of Southeast Asian Nations
- In office March 2011 – December 2013
- President: Barack Obama
- Preceded by: Scot Marciel
- Succeeded by: Nina Hachigian

Personal details
- Born: Indiana
- Spouse: Rebecca Riley
- Children: 2
- Education: DePauw University, Indiana University Maurer School of Law.

David Lee Carden is an American lawyer, diplomat, mediator and author who is a former United States representative to the Association of Southeast Asian Nations (“ASEAN”) with the rank of Ambassador Extraordinary and Plenipotentiary. He was nominated by President Barack Obama in November 2010 and confirmed by the U.S. Senate in March, 2011. He resigned his post in December 2013. Carden was a partner at Jones Day, an international law firm, where he was, at various times, the Partner in Charge of the firm's Asian offices and practices, the head of its International Securities practice, and the head of Litigation in its New York office.

== Legal career ==
Carden began his legal career in the Chicago office of Kirkland & Ellis, where he was in the Litigation Department. While at Kirkland, Carden was a member of the team that represented Amoco in connection with the oil spill that resulted from the grounding of the Amoco Cadiz.

Carden was a partner in the Chicago law firm of Coffield Ungaretti, before joining the Chicago office of Jones Day in 1990. In 2000 Carden moved from Chicago to the firm’s New York office. Carden led Jones Day’s New York Trial Practice department, which included its Intellectual Property and Labor practices. Carden later became Co-Chair of the Jones Day’s worldwide Securities Litigation and Enforcement Practice.

While at Jones Day, Carden was responsible for representing clients in some of the largest securities fraud cases ever litigated, including those concerning Enron, Parmalat and AIG. Carden defended cases concerning derivatives, collateralized debt obligations, credit default swaps, currencies, commodities, options, various direct investments and more traditional financial products.

Carden also coordinated the defense of litigation brought in the courts of numerous foreign countries, including the United Kingdom, France, Switzerland, Luxembourg, the Netherlands Antilles, Thailand, Italy and Barbados, and defended and prosecuted claims and conducted investigations for and against entities in numerous countries, including Indonesia, Singapore, China, Saudi Arabia, Lebanon and Syria.

Carden was recognized by Chambers, New York Super Lawyers and The New York Times “Super Lawyer Section” for his accomplishments defending securities litigation. He also was listed as being one of Lawdragon’s “Lawyers You Need to Know in Securities Litigation”.

== Mediation ==
Carden currently is serving as a mediator in commercial disputes in the United States and is on the board of the Weinstein International Foundation, a non-profit foundation that provides training and promotes the mediation of non-commercial, public interest disputes abroad.

== Indiana University ==
Carden is ambassador-at-large at Indiana University, where he is chairman of the Advisory Board for the Center for Rural Engagement.

== Involvement in politics ==
Carden has been a friend and golf partner of President Barack Obama’s for over twenty years and was an early supporter of his political career. He was an initial member of the National Finance Committee for the Obama 2008 Presidential Campaign. He and his wife, Rebecca Riley, were among the 2008 Campaign’s top bundlers, raising over $500,000.

== Ambassadorship ==
As U.S. Ambassador, Carden oversaw the broadening engagement of the United States in Southeast Asia, which included the Obama Administration's 2011 "pivot" or "rebalance" to the region. Based in the U.S. Mission to ASEAN in Jakarta, he traveled throughout ASEAN's 10 member states and Asia. His responsibilities included supporting ASEAN as it moves toward economic integration in 2015 and advocating for the systemic changes necessary to promote peaceful and prosperous growth in the region.

Under his leadership, the U.S. Mission addressed the issues inherent in realizing ASEAN's aspirations, including economic development, trade liberalization, intellectual property protection, developing the rule of law and more effective governance, pandemic prevention and preparedness, providing more effective responses to natural disasters, advancing health care and educational opportunities, addressing human and wildlife trafficking, terrestrial and maritime environmental protection, managing the region's fisheries and natural resources, responding to deforestation and climate change, food and water security, advancing programs to increase the resilience of ASEAN's people and institutions, promoting historical and cultural preservation, and focusing on sustainable cities. He worked to build alliances in the region, including facilitating efforts by the embassies of countries in the European Union and Latin America in their engagement with ASEAN.

The U.S. Mission to ASEAN, which tripled in size during Carden's tenure, encouraged better decision making in both the ASEAN Member States and in the region. To this end, he hired the first ever science advisor to be posted in an American embassy or mission and advocated successfully for the creation of an ASEAN Fulbright Scholarship Program. The Mission also created an ASEAN-U.S. Science and Technology Fellows Program.

== Honors and awards ==
In recognition of his efforts, Ambassador Carden was given the U.S. Department of State's Superior Honor Award. The Award was given in December 2013. In May, 2014 he received the Thomas Hart Benton Mural Medallion from Indiana University in recognition of his relationship and contributions to the University and for his public service.

In 2016 and 2017, Ambassador Carden was in Residency at the Rockefeller Foundation’s Bellagio Center, where he was working on his book, Mapping ASEAN. He also had a Residency at the Bellagio Center in 2023, when he was working on a novel.

== Board Memberships ==
Ambassador Carden is the Chairman of the Advisory Board for The Center for Rural Engagement at Indiana University.

He also is on the Board of the Weinstein International Foundation, a non-profit foundation that provides training and promotes the mediation of non-commercial, public interest disputes abroad.

== Family and personal life ==
Carden was born in Indiana. He graduated magna cum laude from DePauw University and from the Indiana University Maurer School of Law, where he was Order of the Coif.

Carden is married to Rebecca Riley, a former Vice President of the John D. and Catherine T. MacArthur Foundation. In 1997, Riley arranged for Obama to speak in Chicago at a Valentine’s Day gathering of the “Futures Committee”, a civic leadership group created by the Local Initiatives Support Corp. The speech has been reported to have been “the speech that launched Obama.”

== See also ==
- Ambassadors of the United States
