= Roger H. Gordon =

American economist (born 1949)

- Born: September 14, 1949 (age 77)

Academic background
- Education: MIT; Harvard College
- Doctoral advisor: Jerry A. Hausman

Academic work
- Discipline: Public Finance; Economics of Transition
- Institutions: University of California, San Diego; University of Michigan; Bell Laboratories; Princeton University
- Doctoral students: Mary E. Lovely
- Website: Information at IDEAS / RePEc

Roger Hall Gordon (born September 14, 1949) is an American economist whose research deals primarily with taxation. He graduated from Harvard in 1972 and received a PhD in economics from MIT in 1976. In 1984, he moved to the University of Michigan, first as an associate professor, then professor, and later as the Reuben Kempf Professor of Economics. He has also taught at Princeton, and been a visiting professor all over the world. Since 2001, he has been a professor of economics at UCSD.

He is a research associate as the National Bureau of Economic Research and the Centre for Economic Policy Research. Between 2004 and 2010, he served as the editor of the Journal of Economic Literature. He has also been an editor for the Journal of Public Economics and the American Economic Review. He is fellow of the Econometric Society and the American Academy of Arts and Sciences.

From 1992 to 2016 he organized the Trans-Atlantic Public Economics Seminar.

The CESifo's website notes that "Roger Gordon's work has contributed to the understanding of a wide range of economic issues, with a focus on public finance and development economics. His contributions examine, for example, the role of tax policy in the development process, both in general contexts and in the special case of China. His research also focuses on tax policy issues in open economies. In general, many of his papers deal with the effects of taxation on corporate and individual behavior and their implications for tax policy."
