= United States Studies Centre =

Australian research institute studying the United States

Coordinates: 33.890865°S 151.189663°E

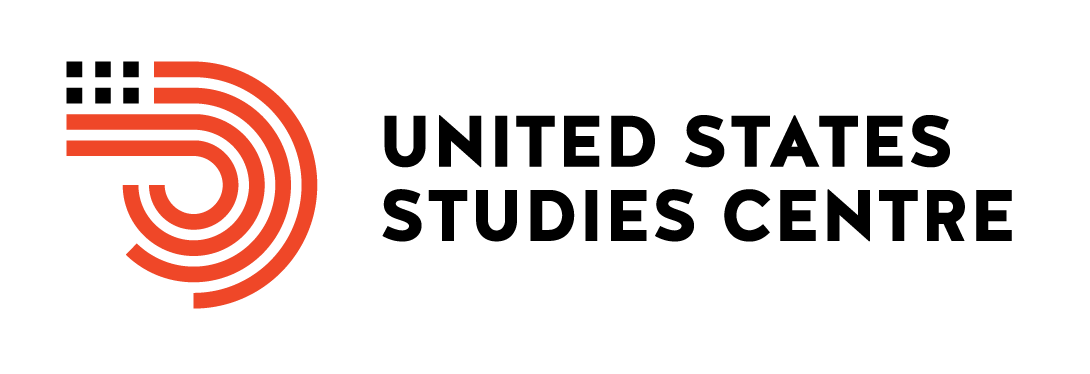

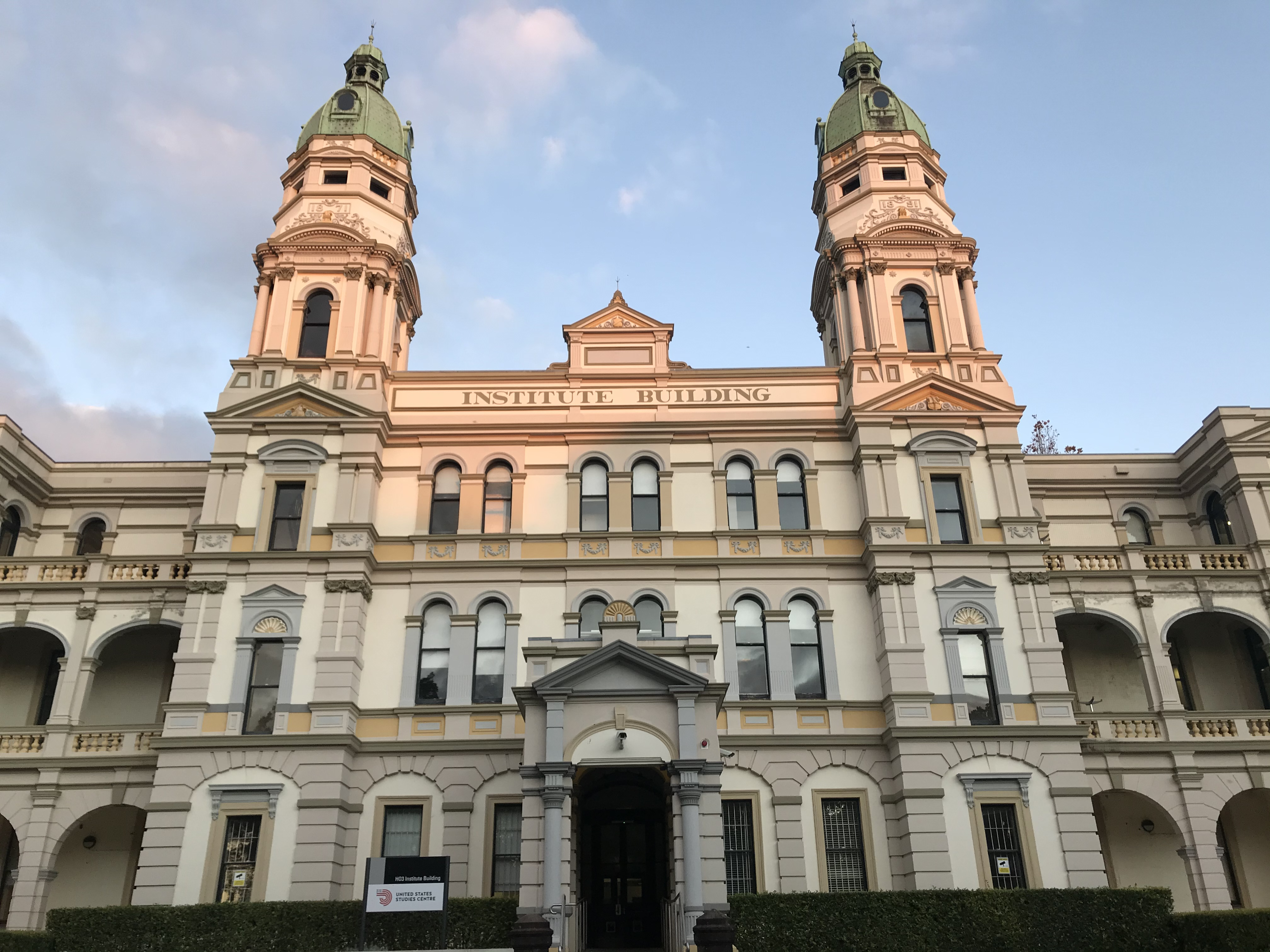
- The centre's headquarters located at the Institute Building at the University of Sydney
- Company type: Non-profit think tank
- Founded: 2006; 20 years ago
- Headquarters: The University of Sydney, Sydney, Australia
- Key people: Michael Green, CEO; Mark Baillie, Chair of the Board of Directors
- Revenue: 13,129,214 Australian dollar (2023)
- Total assets: 27,209,840 Australian dollar (2023)
- Number of employees: 31 (2023)
- Parent: University of Sydney
- Website: http://www.ussc.edu.au

The United States Studies Centre (USSC) is a think tank based at the University of Sydney. It is dedicated to the analysis of American foreign policy, economic security, emerging technology, politics, society, and culture—and how it impacts Australia, the Indo-Pacific region and the world. The Centre aims to increase understanding of the United States in Australia and enrich the Australia–United States relationship. In addition to its policy-focussed research, it also teaches undergraduate and postgraduate students.

== History ==
Then-prime minister John Howard announced in 2006 a $25 million endowment to establish a United States Studies Centre. After a national competition administered by the New-York-based American Australian Association (AAA), the University of Sydney won the right to form the centre in partnership with the AAA, with additional support from the NSW government and the private sector.

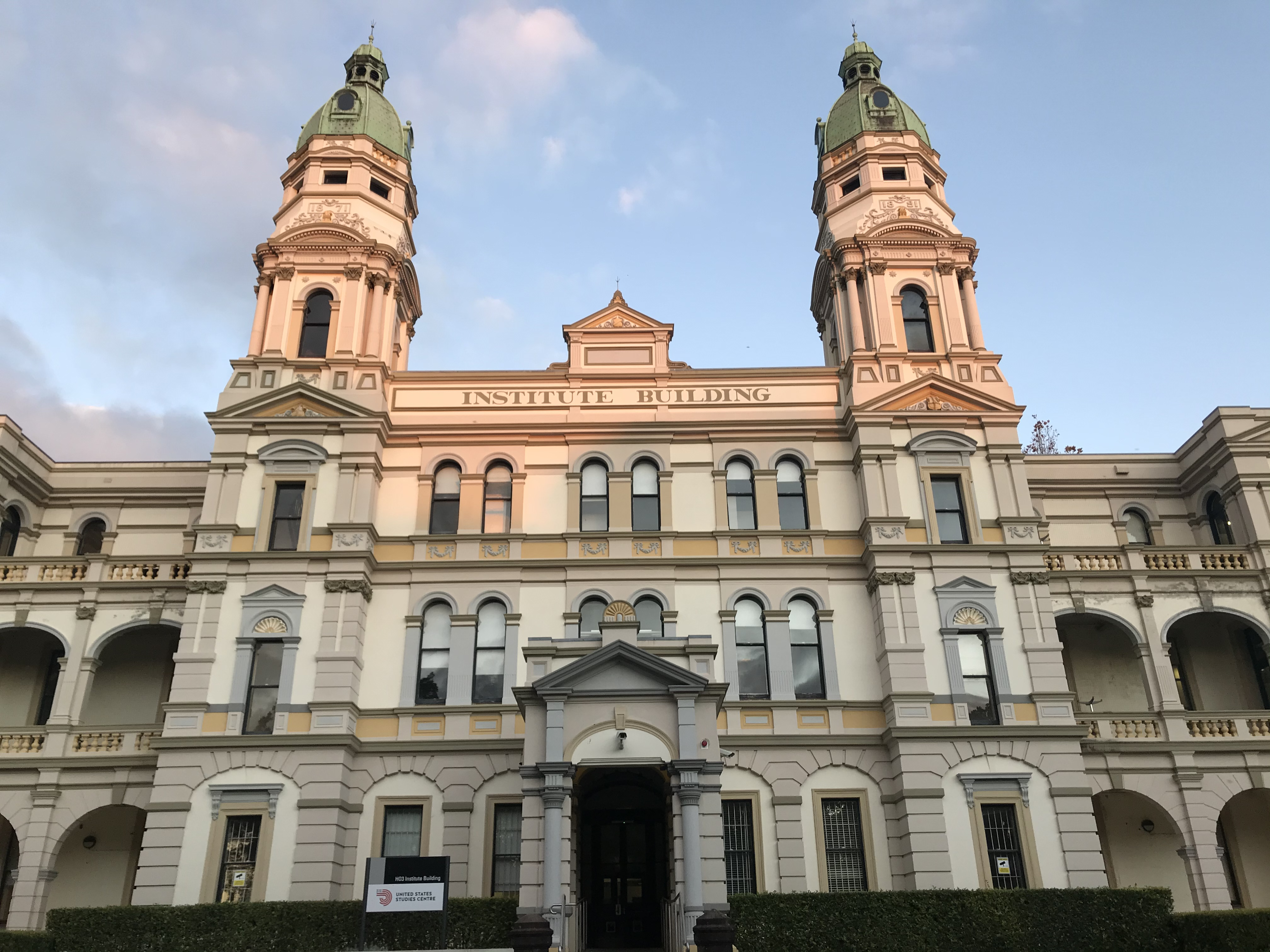
University of Sydney Institute Building, where the United States Studies Centre is located

The centre constituted its board of directors chaired by Malcolm Binks, and held its first national summit on the Bush presidency in 2007. The centre admitted its first postgraduate students in its MA and PhD degrees in US studies in early 2008. This year also saw the appointment of the centre's founding CEO, Professor Geoffrey Garrett, its chair in US Politics, Professor Margaret Levi as well as the completion of the centre's building at the University of Sydney's Darlington campus. In 2009, the centre appointed journalist James Fallows as chair in US Media, offered its first undergraduate unit of study on "The US in the world", and formed a partnership with Harvard University to host the centre's second National Summit on Sustainable Globalisation.

In 2009, the centre hosted its first cohort of six postdoctoral fellows, chosen from 176 applicants. The fellows' work focused on a variety of issues related to the United States, including cross-national comparisons of the role of religion, effects of increases in income inequality, the history of financial exchanges, U.S. and Arab-Israeli relations, Latino interest in education policy, and the history of sexual liberation in the 1970s U.S.

In the same year, the centre appointed former executive director of recovery management for the City of New Orleans Edward Blakely as honorary professor in urban policy and former Australian Ambassador to the UN Robert Hill as adjunct professor in sustainability.

In 2010 the centre announced the $2 million Dow Sustainability Program, funded by the US-based Dow Chemical Company Foundation. The program was aimed at bringing together academic and policy experts from Australia and the US to develop action-oriented solutions to a range of sustainability challenges concerning energy, water, food and biodiversity that are technologically innovative, commercially scalable and politically viable. The program was extended until 2015 and completed its work in early 2016.

Bates Gill replaced Geoffrey Garrett as chief executive officer in October 2012. Michael J. Green was appointed CEO in March 2022.

== Funding ==
The centre is funded from an endowment established by the Australian Government of $25 million with additional support from the University of Sydney, the NSW Government and the American Australian Association through contributions from businesses and private individuals.
