= Nicholas R. Lardy =

Scholar of China

Nicholas R. "Nick" Lardy (born in 1946) is a policy scholar and influential expert on the economy of China. A longstanding China watcher, he has been a senior fellow at the Peterson Institute for International Economics (PIIE) since 2003. He has been referred to as "one of the world's leading experts on the Chinese economy" and "everybody's guru on China".

== Early life and education ==
Lardy received his Bachelor of Arts degree from the University of Wisconsin in 1968, and his PhD from the University of Michigan in 1975, both in economics.

== Career ==
From 1975 to 1983, Lardy served as assistant professor, then associate professor of economics at Yale University. He was then associate professor, then professor of international studies at the University of Washington from 1983 to 1995, chairing the university's China Program from 1984 to 1989 and directing its Henry M. Jackson School of International Studies from 1991 to 1995.

From 1995 to 2003, Lardy was a senior fellow in the Foreign Policy Studies Program of the Brookings Institution. From 1997 to 2000, he was also the Frederick Frank Adjunct Professor of International Trade and Finance at the Yale School of Management.

Lardy joined the Peterson Institute for International Economics in 2003 and became the institute's reference scholar on China, including as Anthony M. Solomon Senior Fellow from 2010 to 2021.

== Works ==
- Economic Growth and Distribution in China (1978), Cambridge University Press
- Agriculture in China's Modern Economic Development (1983), Cambridge University Press
- Foreign Trade and Economic Reform in China, 1978–1990 (1991), Cambridge University Press
- China in the World Economy (1994), Washington DC: Institute for International Economics
- China's Unfinished Economic Revolution (1998), Washington DC: Brookings Institution Press
- Integrating China into the Global Economy (2001), Washington DC: Brookings Institution Press
- China: The Balance Sheet – What The World Needs To Know Now About the Emerging Superpower (2006, with C. Fred Bergsten and Bates Gill), Public Affairs
- The China Balance Sheet in 2007 and Beyond (2007, with C. Fred Bergsten and Bates Gill), Center for Strategic and International Studies and Peterson Institute for International Economics
- China's Rise: Challenges and Opportunities (2008, with C. Fred Bergsten, Charles W. Freeman III, and Derek J. Mitchell), Washington DC: Peterson Institute for International Economics
- The Future of China's Exchange Rate Policy (2009, with Morris Goldstein), Washington DC: Peterson Institute for International Economics
- Sustaining China's Economic Growth after the Global Financial Crisis (2012), Washington DC: Peterson Institute for International Economics
- Markets over Mao: The Rise of Private Business in China (2014), Washington DC: Peterson Institute for International Economics
- The State Strikes Back: The End of Economic Reform in China? (2019), Washington DC: Peterson Institute for International Economics

== See also ==
- David Dollar
- Mary E. Lovely
- Roderick MacFarquhar
- Orville Schell
