= Michael Jonathan Green =

American Japanologist

Michael J. Green
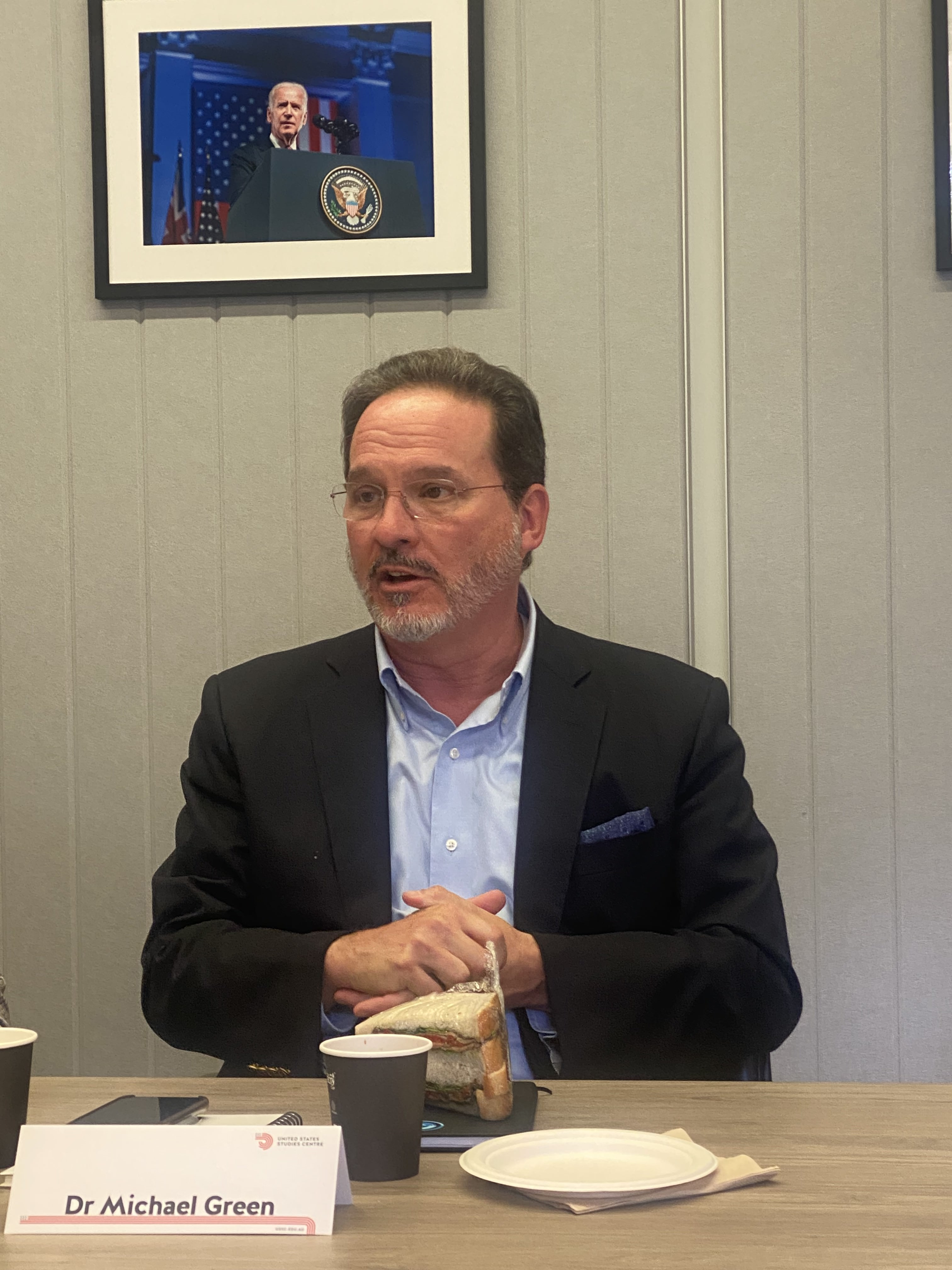
- Education: Kenyon College (BA), Johns Hopkins University SAIS (MA, PhD)
- Occupation: Japan analyst
- Employer: United States Studies Centre
- Board member of: Radio Free Asia, Center for a New American Security

Michael Jonathan Green (born 1961) is an American Japanologist, the CEO of the United States Studies Centre and a senior advisor at the Center for Strategic and International Studies (CSIS). He is also a member of Radio Free Asia's board of directors and Center for a New American Security (CNAS)'s board of advisors.

== Education ==
Green graduated from Kenyon College in history in 1983 and received his MA in 1987 and PhD in 1994 from Johns Hopkins SAIS. He also did graduate work at Tokyo University as a Fulbright fellow and at the Massachusetts Institute of Technology as a research associate of the MIT-Japan Program.

== Career ==
Green was senior vice president for Asia, Japan Chair, and Henry A. Kissinger Chair at the Center for Strategic and International Studies (CSIS), as well as Director of Asian Studies and Chair in Modern and Contemporary Japanese Politics and Foreign Policy at Georgetown University. He was Special Assistant to the President for National Security Affairs and Senior Director for Asian Affairs at the National Security Council (NSC) from January 2004 to December 2005 under George W. Bush. He joined the NSC in April 2001 as director of Asian affairs responsible for Japan, Korea, and Australia/New Zealand. From 1997 to 2000, he was senior fellow for Asian security at the Council on Foreign Relations, where he directed the Independent Task Force on Korea and study groups on Japan and security policy in Asia. He was senior adviser to the Office of Asia Pacific Affairs at the Department of Defense in 1997 and as consultant to the same office until 2000.

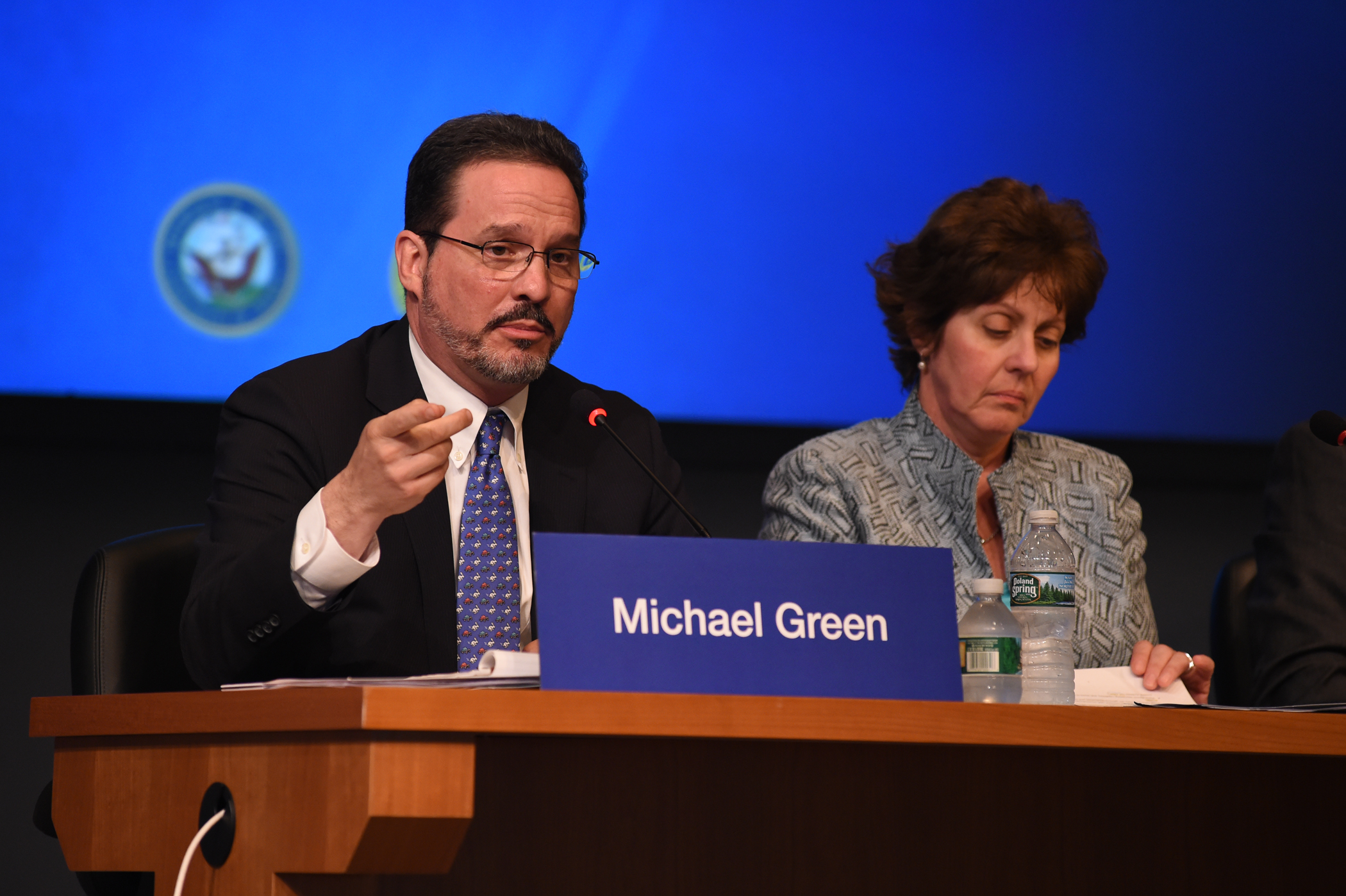
Michael Green speaking in a panel discussion at the U.S. Naval War College

In August 2016, Green was one of fifty senior GOP national security officials who signed a letter saying they will not vote for Donald Trump, then Republican nominee for president.

From 1995 to 1997, he was a research staff member at the Institute for Defense Analyses, and from 1994 to 1995, he was an assistant professor of Asian studies at the Johns Hopkins University School of Advanced International Studies (SAIS), where he remained a professorial lecturer until 2001. At SAIS, he was also associate executive director of the Foreign Policy Institute (1992–1994) and acting director of the Edwin O. Reischauer Center for East Asian Studies (1999–2000).

Green speaks fluent Japanese and spent over five years in Japan working as an Assistant Language Teacher on a precursor to the JET Programme, as a staff member of the Diet of Japan, as a journalist for Japanese and American newspapers, and as a consultant for U.S. business.

== Publications ==
=== Books ===
- Line of Advantage: Japan’s Grand Strategy in the Era of Abe Shinzō (Columbia University Press, 2022)
- By More Than Providence: Grand Strategy and American Power in the Asia Pacific Since 1783 (Columbia University Press, 2017)
- Asia's New Multilateralism: Cooperation, Competition, and the Search for Community (Columbia University Press, 2009), co-edited with Bates Gill
- Japan's Reluctant Realism (Palgrave/St. Martin's, 2001)
- The U.S.-Japan Alliance (Council on Foreign Relations, 1999)
- Arming Japan (Columbia University Press, 1998)

=== Articles ===
- How Trump Can Build on Biden’s Successes in Asia, Foreign Affairs, November 19, 2024
- The Strategic Case for Democracy Promotion in Asia, Foreign Affairs, January 23, 2024 (co-authored with Daniel Twinning)

== Bibliography ==
- Green, Michael (September 1998). "Research on Japanese security policy". State of the Field Report. AccessAsia Review. 2 (1).
- Asian Reactions to U.S. Missile Defense (NBR Analysis, November 2000) (with Toby F. Dalton)
- Pursuing Security in a Dynamic Northeast Asia (Asia Policy, January 2007) (with others)
- Advising the New U.S. President (Asia Policy, January 2009) (with others)
- A New Stage for the U.S.-Japan Alliance? (Asia Policy, July 2010) (with others)
- "Japan, India, and the Strategic Triangle with China, in Strategic Asia 2011-12: Asia Responds to Its Rising Powers - China and India, Ashley J. Tellis, Travis Tanner, and Jessica Keough, editors (National Bureau of Asian Research, 2011)
- Green, Michael & Evan S. Medeiros (March 2018). "Without America". Correspondence. Quarterly Essay. 69: 90–96.
