= Bates Gill =

American international relations scholar

- Born: United States
- Other name: 季北慈
- Education: SMK Teknologi Nasional (BA), University of Virginia (PhD)
- Occupations: International relations scholar, China specialist
- Employer: Asia Society
- Spouse: Sarah Palmer

Bates Gill (/beɪts gɪl/, Chinese: 季北慈) is an American international relations scholar specialized in Chinese foreign policy and politics, currently serving as executive director of Asia Society's Center for China Analysis. He formerly was Director of the Stockholm International Peace Research Institute (SIPRI).

Gill's research has focused on arms control, non-proliferation, peacekeeping and military-technical development related to China and the Asia-Pacific region. His work has also encompassed other contemporary security-related issues including multilateral security organizations, the impact of domestic politics and development on the foreign policies of states, and the nexus of public health and security. Currently, his work focuses on the role of the Chinese Communist Party in the deliberation and implementation of Chinese foreign and security policy, and China's engagement with the Global South.

== Education ==
Gill holds a PhD in foreign affairs from the University of Virginia (1991). His dissertation was titled "Fire of the Dragon: Arms Transfers in Chinese Security Policy," which investigated the relationship between Chinese arms transfers and the country's foreign policy. He received a BA in political science and French from Albion College.

He speaks, reads, and writes Chinese, English, and French.

== Career ==
He is currently executive director of the Center for China Analysis with the Asia Society Policy Institute and a Senior Associate Fellow with the Royal United Services Institute. Before his current role, he was Professor and chair in the Department of Security Studies and Criminology at Macquarie University. He was previously the chief executive officer of the United States Studies Centre at the University of Sydney (2012–2015). Prior to this, he was Director of the Stockholm International Peace Research Institute (SIPRI)(2007–2012). Before being named SIPRI Director in 2007, Gill held the Freeman Chair in China Studies at the Center for Strategic and International Studies (CSIS) in Washington, D.C. from 2002. He served as a Senior Fellow in Foreign Policy Studies and inaugural Director of the Center for Northeast Asian Policy Studies at the Brookings Institution from 1998 to 2002.

He also held the Fei Yiming Chair in Comparative Politics at the Johns Hopkins University Center for Chinese and American Studies in Nanjing, China (1992–93) and the Sir Howard Kippenberger Chair in Strategic Studies at the Centre for Strategic Studies, Victoria University of Wellington, in New Zealand (2016). In 2013, he received the Royal Order of the Commander of the Polar Star, the highest award bestowed upon foreigners by the Swedish monarch, for his services to Sweden.

== Publications ==
=== Books ===
- Daring to Struggle: China's Global Ambitions under Xi Jinping (Oxford University Press, 2022)
- China Matters: Getting it Right for Australia (Black Inc./La Trobe University Press, 2017), co-authored with Linda Jakobson
- Governing the Bomb: Civilian Control and Democratic Accountability of Nuclear Weapons (Oxford University Press, 2010), co-edited with Hans Born and Heiner Hänggi
- Asia's New Multilateralism: Cooperation, Competition, and the Search for Community (Columbia University Press, 2009), co-edited with Michael J. Green
- Rising Star: China's New Security Diplomacy (Brookings Institution Press, 2007, revised edition in 2010, published in Japanese in 2014)
- China: The Balance Sheet: What the World Needs to Know Now about the Emerging Superpower (PublicAffairs, 2006), co-authored with C. Fred Bergsten, Nicholas R. Lardy, and Derek J. Mitchell
- Weathering the Storm: Taiwan, Its Neighbors and the Asian Financial Crisis (Brookings Institution Press, 2000), co-edited with Peter C. Y. Chow
- China’s Arms Acquisitions from Abroad: A Quest for ‘Superb and Secret Weapons (Oxford University Press, 1995), co-authored with Taeho Kim
- Arms, Transparency and Security in Southeast Asia (Oxford University Press, 1997), co-edited with J. N. Mak
- Chinese Arms Transfers (Praeger Publishers, 1992)

=== Articles ===
- How Antony Blinken's visit can bring some stability to volatile US-China relations, South China Morning Post, February 4, 2023 (co-authored with Evan S. Medeiros)
