= Jack Rodman =

American advisor on China real estate

Jack R. Rodman
- Born: c. 1946 (age 79–80); United States
- Citizenship: American
- Education: University of California, Los Angeles
- Occupations: Property advisor and consultant
- Employer(s): Crosswater Realty Advisors, formerly King & Wood (senior advisor)
- Known for: Non-performing loan (NPL) advisory for real estate in China

Jack Rodman is a Shanghai-based property advisor and consultant. He was formerly a senior advisor at the law firm King & Wood advising their corporate team on financial matters. He is currently a consultant at Crosswater Realty Advisors. Rodman is a frequent speaker on China real estate and banking.

He typically comments on the real estate industry in China and has been featured in Business Week, the China Economic Review, Bloomberg, and USA Today.

== Professional career ==
During the Asian Financial Crisis, Rodman and his staff of several hundred at Ernst & Young have helped sell off Asian debt with a face value approaching $100 billion since 1998. This helped revitalize the banking systems of many Asian nations and helped facilitate recovery during the 1997 Asian financial crisis.

After retiring from Ernst & Young after 37 years in 2007, Rodman advises at King & Wood and served on the board of RREEF Commercial Trust. and is also a senior advisor with Westport Capital Partners. Due to his expertise and history in Asia, he is commonly quoted expert on NPL disposal and Asian economics.
