= Schoonover =

Schoonover refers to:

- Brenda Schoonover (contemporary), American diplomat, former U.S. Ambassador to Togo
- Daniel D. Schoonover (1933–1953), American soldier, Medal of Honor recipient
- Frank Schoonover (1877–1972), American illustrator
- Thomas David Schoonover (1936-2023), American historian
- Lawrence Schoonover (1906–1980), American novelist
- Ray Schoonover:
  - Ray Schoonover (comics), Marvel Comics character
  - Ray H. Schoonover (1896–1966), American businessman and politician
- Terry Schoonover (1951–1984), American race car driver
- Wear Schoonover (1910–1982), American college football player
- Darrill Schoonover (1985), American professional mixed martial artist
