= Jeff Grant =

Jeff Grant may refer to:

- Jeff Grant (politician), New Zealand politician
- Jeff Grant (attorney), American lawyer and minister

== See also ==
- Geoff Grant (disambiguation)
