= Julie Furuta-Toy =

American diplomat (born 1960)

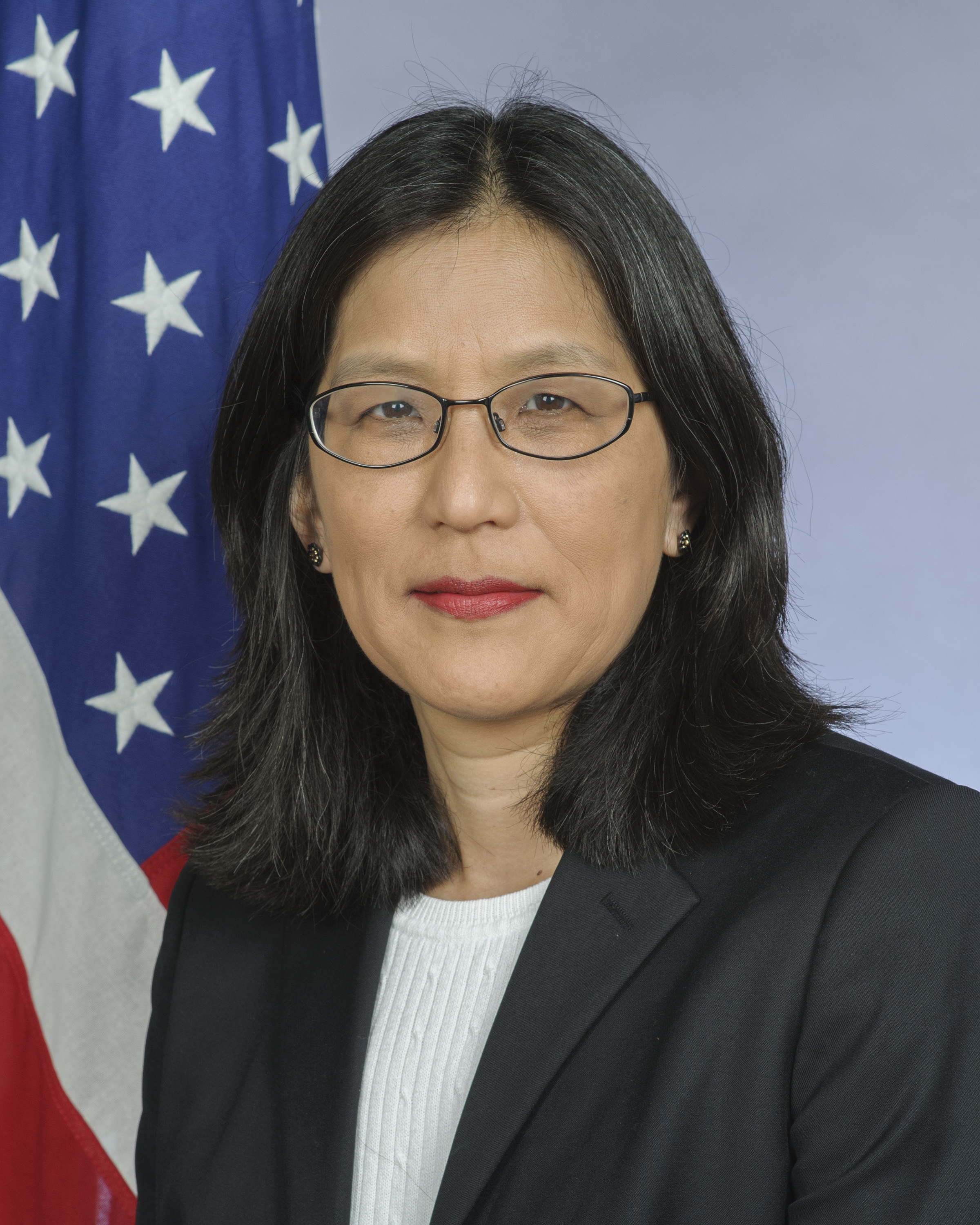

United States Ambassador to Equatorial Guinea
- In office January 7, 2016 – February 25, 2019
- President: Barack Obama; Donald Trump
- Preceded by: Mark L. Asquino
- Succeeded by: Susan N. Stevenson

United States Ambassador to Norway Acting
- In office September 28, 2013 – June 2015
- President: Barack Obama
- Preceded by: Barry White
- Succeeded by: Robert Bradtke (Acting)

Personal details
- Born: 1960 (age 65–66)
- Education: University of California, Riverside; Indiana University Bloomington; National Defense University

Julie Furuta-Toy (born 1960) is a former U.S. Ambassador to Equatorial Guinea. Following an initial announcement by President Barack Obama on June 18, 2015, Ambassador Furuta-Toy was confirmed by the United States Senate on October 22, 2015, and subsequently sworn in on November 24, 2015. She arrived in Malabo to take up her duties on January 7, 2016. Prior to her arrival in Equatorial Guinea, Ms. Furuta-Toy served as both Deputy Chief of Mission and chargé d'affaires at the Embassy of the United States, Oslo, (2012-2015). Her lengthy tenure as chargé d'affaires stemmed from delays related to the nomination and confirmation of a new ambassador to Norway by the United States Senate.

== Early life and education ==
Ambassador Furuta-Toy was born in Opelika, Alabama, and raised in Riverside, California, and is the daughter of Emi K. Furuta and Tokuji Furuta. She earned a Bachelor's degree from University of California, Riverside in 1981, and credits her liberal arts education and study abroad her final year in the United Kingdom with sparking her interest in a foreign service career. She also earned a Master's degree in comparative literature from Indiana University Bloomington and a Master's degree in security studies from the Industrial College of the Armed Forces.

== Career ==
Ambassador Furuta-Toy entered the United States Foreign Service in 1986 and has served overseas assignments in the Philippines, Venezuela, Haiti, India, and Russia. She has served domestic assignments in the Bureau of Consular Affairs, the Bureau for International Narcotics and Law Enforcement Affairs, and the Bureau of Human Resources. Her service as a consular officer includes time as Director of the Office of Children's Issues (2007–2009) and Director of the Office of Public and Diplomatic Liaison of the Visa Office (2004–2007). Prior to her arrival in Norway, she was the Deputy Chief of Mission at the U.S. Embassy in Accra, Ghana (2009–2012).

== Personal ==
Furuta-Toy is married to Steven M. Toy, a fellow Foreign Service Officer, and they are the parents of two adult children. They reside in Wapiti, Wyoming.

Furuta-Toy is of Japanese descent. Both of her parents were sent to Japanese internment camps during World War II.

In addition to English, she speaks Spanish and Russian. Her hobbies include handicrafts, pet care, and listening to the viola.

Diplomatic posts
Preceded by Barry White	United States Chargé d'Affaires in Norway; 2013–2015	Succeeded by Robert Bradtke
Preceded by Mark L. Asquino	United States Ambassador to Equatorial Guinea; 2016–2019	Succeeded by Susan N. Stevenson
