= David Korn =

David Korn may refer to:

- David Korn (computer scientist) (born 1943), American computer scientist
- David A. Korn (1930–2022), American diplomat, ambassador to Togo

== See also ==
- David Corn (born 1959), American political journalist and author
