= Alberto Fernandez (diplomat) =

Cuban-American diplomat (born 1958)

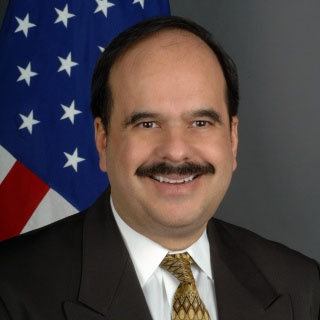
- Born: Alberto Miguel Fernandez; 1958 (age 67–68); Havana, Cuba
- Occupation: Diplomat (formerly)

Alberto Miguel Fernandez (born 1958) is a Cuban-American former diplomat and journalist. He was the head of the Middle East Broadcasting Networks (MBN), which includes Alhurra. Fernandez is currently vice president of the Middle East Media Research Institute, a position he held 2015–2017. He is also a contributor to EWTN News. He is a member of the Madrid Forum, an international group of individuals organized by Vox.

== Career ==
He is a Non-Resident Fellow in Middle East Politics and Media at the TRENDS Research and Advisory center in Abu Dhabi, United Arab Emirates. He is also on the Board of Advisors of the International Center for the Study of Violent Extremism (ICSVE) IDC (In Defense of Christians) and a Fellow at the Ben Franklin Fellowship since 2024.

He was the Coordinator for Strategic Counterterrorism Communications (CSCC) at the U.S. Department of State in Washington, D.C. from March 2012 to February 2015. CSCC was set up in September 2011 by White House Executive Order 13584 to combat the propaganda of Al-Qaida, its allies and adherents. He was US Ambassador to Equatorial Guinea, Africa's third largest oil producer and only Spanish speaking country, from January 2010. Before that he was Chargé d'affaires of the U.S. Embassy in Khartoum, Sudan from 2007 to 2009. In Sudan, he worked to maintain the 2005 Comprehensive Peace Accords between the NCP government and the rebels of the Sudan Peoples Liberation Army (SPLA) and to bring humanitarian relief to war-torn Darfur.

Fernandez was the director of the office of press and public diplomacy in the Bureau of Near Eastern Affairs at the United States Department of State from August 2005 to May 2007. As one of the few to speak fluent Arabic at the U.S. State Department, he was the mouthpiece for U.S. policy in the Middle East. A Newsweek profile started that he gave an average of about 200 interviews a year.

Fernandez has also served in senior US embassy positions, as Counselor for Public Affairs, in Kabul, Amman, Guatemala City, and Damascus. Earlier in his career, he served at the US Embassy in Kuwait (Public Affairs Officer), Managua (Press Attache and Spokesman), Santo Domingo (Director of the Dominican American Cultural Institute, ICDA), and Abu Dhabi.

=== 2006 Al-Jazeera interview ===
In an Arabic-language interview on Al-Jazeera on October 21, 2006, Fernandez made statements translated as, "I think there is great room for strong criticism, because without doubt, there was arrogance and stupidity by the United States in Iraq."

The State Department reacted by denying that he had made the comments, claiming that they had been "mistranslated." After independent translators confirmed the translation as being correct, a news release issued by the State Department quoted an apology from Fernandez: "Upon reading the transcript of my appearance on Al-Jazeera, I realized that I seriously misspoke by using the phrase 'there has been arrogance and stupidity' by the U.S. in Iraq. This represents neither my views nor those of the State Department. I apologize."

Similarly, US Ambassador to Iraq Zalmay Khalilzad said in English days before Fernandez's comments: "It's important to recognize that mistakes have been made over the last few years. There have been times when US officials have behaved arrogantly and were not receptive to advice from local leaders."

== Awards and honors ==
Fernandez is a recipient of a Presidential Meritorious Service Award for 2008, the State Department's 2006 Edward R. Murrow Award for Excellence in Public Diplomacy, a Superior Honor Award in 2003 for his work in Afghanistan, and the 1996 Linguist of the Year Award, among many others. He has written for The Lamp (magazine), The American Conservative, the Foreign Service Journal, MEMRI, Journal of International Security Affairs, The Cipher Brief, AFPC Almanac of Islamism, The Washington Post, Providence, Georgetown Cornerstone, Brookings Markaz, Middle East Quarterly, The European Conservative, The American Mind, Defense Dossier, IM1776 ReVista the Harvard Review of Latin America, University Bookman and Journal of the Assyrian Academic Society. He has also lectured at numerous U.S. universities and conferences worldwide. Born in Cuba and raised in Miami, Florida, he is a graduate of the University of Arizona and Defense Language Institute. He is fluent in Arabic (4/3+), Spanish (5/5) and English.

== Timeline ==
- 1958 - born in Havana, Cuba.
- 1959 - arrived in Miami, Florida, as a refugee.
- 1976 - serves in US Army and Reserves till 1981.
- 1981 - receives BA in Middle East Studies from the University of Arizona.
- 1983 - MA in Middle East Studies from the University of Arizona. Joined the United States Information Agency. Served as a Junior Officer in Abu Dhabi, United Arab Emirates and Assistant Cultural Affairs Officer in Santo Domingo, Dominican Republic.
- 1986 - Press Attaché at the US Embassy in Managua, Nicaragua.
- 1988 - Public Affairs Officer at US Embassy in Kuwait.
- 1990 - Country Affairs Officer for Egypt, Yemen, and Sudan in the USIA/NEA Area Office, Washington DC.
- 1993 - Public Affairs Counselor in Damascus, Syria.
- 1996 - Public Affairs Counselor in Guatemala City, Guatemala.
- 1999 - Public Affairs Counselor in Amman, Jordan.
- 2002 - Public Affairs Counselor in Kabul, Afghanistan.
- 2004 - stationed at the U.S. Embassy in Kabul, Afghanistan on a one-year posting. (possible conflict between references on Kabul posting dates)
- 2005 July - appointed Director for Public Diplomacy for the Bureau of Near Eastern Affairs.
- 2006 October - Apologises for "US arrogance and stupidity in Iraq" comments.
- 2006 November - wins the Edward R. Murrow Award for Excellence in Public Diplomacy.
- 2007 June - Charge D'affaires, U.S. Embassy in Khartoum, Sudan
- 2009 July - Nominated as Ambassador Extraordinary and Plenipotentiary to the Republic of Equatorial Guinea; confirmed by the US Senate on December 24, 2009.
- 2012 March - Coordinator for Strategic Counterterrorism Communications (CSCC).
- 2015 May - retires from the Department of State.
- 2015 May - Vice-president, MEMRI.
- 2017 July - President, Middle East Broadcasting Networks (MBN).
- 2020 June - Returns to MEMRI as vice president.

== Sources ==
Diplomatic posts
Preceded by Donald C. Johnson	United States Ambassador to Equatorial Guinea; 2010–2012	Succeeded by Mark L. Asquino
