= The Future, Made in China =

2026 essay by Evan Osnos

"The Future, Made in China" is an essay published in The New Yorker on August 3, 2026 by journalist Evan Osnos, focusing on China's technological development following Osnos's reporting trip there earlier in the year. The premise of the essay describes a United States that has lost focus on cutting edge technologies, while China has benefitted from the Trump Administration's policies on immigration, budgets, and trade.

== Background ==
Evan Osnos is a staff writer for The New Yorker. He previously was the Beijing bureau chief for the Chicago Tribune, and in 2014 authored "Age Of Ambition: Chasing Fortune, Truth, And Faith In The New China".

"The Future, Made in China" was the result of four months of reporting, including a 10-day trip to China.

== Summary ==
Osnos interviewed a variety of China-based businesspeople, including artificial intelligence company 01.AI CEO Kai-Fu Lee. He described Beijing as "quieter than when I lived there, from 2005 to 2013", noting the increase in electric vehicles and e-commerce. Osnos dicusses Chinese advancedment in biotech, citing conversations with American executives, and China's production of drones, electric vehicles, lithium-ion batteries and solar cells.

== Reaction ==
The Sinica podcast, hosted by Kaiser Kuo, described the essay as "a meditation on what China’s technological ascent means for the United States, for how both societies are organized, and for the rest of us, whose futures increasingly seem to be wagered by two small circles of powerful men in Beijing and Washington."
