= Truman Talley Books =

Truman Talley Books was an imprint at:

- Times Books (1980–1983)
- E. P. Dutton (1983–2008)
