= List of ambassadors of the United States to Equatorial Guinea =

Ambassador of the United States to Equatorial Guinea
- Seal of the United States Department of State

- Flag of a United States ambassador

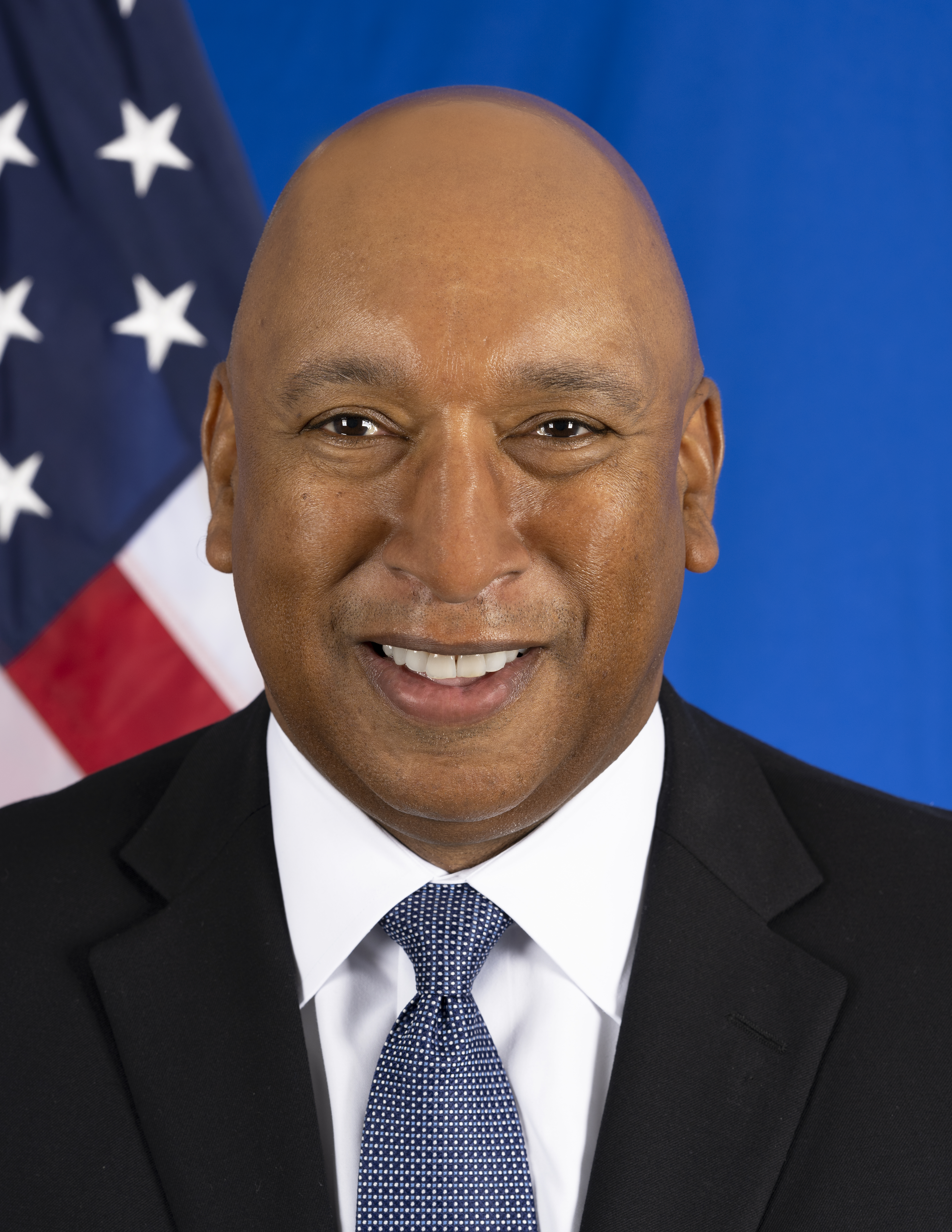
- Incumbent; Stanley L. Brown since TBD
- Nominator: The president of the United States
- Appointer: The president; with Senate advice and consent
- Inaugural holder: Albert W. Sherer, Jr. as Ambassador Extraordinary and Plenipotentiary
- Formation: September 13, 1967
- Website: U.S. Embassy - Malabo

The United States has maintained diplomatic ties to Equatorial Guinea since independence in 1968. Until 1981, US ambassadors served as the contacts to other African countries simultaneously rather than have a separate person just for Equatorial Guinea.

== History ==
In the 19th century, the area of Central Africa that now contains the nation of Equatorial Guinea was under Spanish control. The area was known as Spanish Guinea and included the small mainland area of Río Muni and the island of Fernão do Pó (or Fernando Pó), now named Bioko. Rio Muni became a Spanish protectorate in 1885 and a colony in 1900. In 1926 the island of Bioko and the mainland area of Río Muni were united as the colony of Spanish Guinea.

In 1959, the Spanish territory of the Gulf of Guinea was established as a province of Spain known as the Spanish Equatorial Region. Local elections were held and representatives elected to the Cortes Generales (Spanish parliament).

In 1963 limited autonomy was granted to Spanish Guinea and the people were able to elect members to its own legislature.

In March 1968, under pressure from Equatorial Guinean nationalists and the United Nations, Spain announced that it would grant independence to Equatorial Guinea. A constitutional convention produced an electoral law and draft constitution. In the presence of a UN observer team, a referendum was held on August 11, 1968, and a new constitution was approved. In September 1968, the first president was elected, and independence was granted in October.

The United States immediately recognized Equatorial Guinea and moved to establish diplomatic relations. Albert W. Sherer, Jr., the ambassador to Togo, was additionally accredited as Ambassador Extraordinary and Plenipotentiary to Equatorial Guinea on October 28, 1968, and presented his credentials to the president on November 21. Sherer remained resident at Lomé, Togo.

An embassy in Santa Isabel (now Malabo) was opened August 1, 1969, with Albert N. Williams as chargé d'affaires ad interim.

In December 1969 the ambassador to Cameroon was accredited to Equatorial Guinea while resident in Yaoundé, Cameroon.

The embassy in Malabo was closed in 1995 and its functions were transferred to the embassy in Cameroon. The embassy was reopened in 2004.

== Ambassadors ==
Name	Title	Appointed	Presented credentials	Terminated mission	Notes
Albert W. Sherer Jr. – Career FSO	Ambassador Extraordinary and Plenipotentiary	September 13, 1967	October 13, 1967	March 5, 1970	Beginning in 1969 one ambassador, resident in Yaoundé, was accredited to Equatorial Guinea and Cameroon.
Lewis Hoffacker – Career FSO	Ambassador Extraordinary and Plenipotentiary	December 2, 1969	January 21, 1970	Left Yaoundé June 6, 1972	
C. Robert Moore – Career FSO	Ambassador Extraordinary and Plenipotentiary	September 25, 1972	January 9, 1973	Left Yaoundé July 28, 1975	
Herbert J. Spiro – Political appointee	Ambassador Extraordinary and Plenipotentiary	July 24, 1975	September 1, 1975	March 14, 1976.	Declared persona non grata by government of Equatorial Guinea. After the ambassador was rejected by the government of Equatorial Guinea, the post was vacant until 1979.
Mabel Murphy Smythe – Political appointee	Ambassador Extraordinary and Plenipotentiary	December 17, 1979	December 19, 1979	Left Yaoundé February 24, 1980	
Hume A. Horan – Career FSO	Ambassador Extraordinary and Plenipotentiary	June 30, 1980	August 14, 1980	September 29, 1981	In 1981 the first ambassador was appointed solely accredited to Equatorial Guinea.
Alan M. Hardy – Career FSO	Ambassador Extraordinary and Plenipotentiary	October 26, 1981	November 19, 1981	June 26, 1984	
Francis Stephen Ruddy – Political appointee	Ambassador Extraordinary and Plenipotentiary	October 5, 1984	January 27, 1985	March 25, 1988	
Chester E. Norris, Jr. – Career FSO	Ambassador Extraordinary and Plenipotentiary	February 5, 1988	March 15, 1988	April 18, 1991	
John E. Bennett – Career FSO	Ambassador Extraordinary and Plenipotentiary	July 2, 1991	September 5, 1991	February 25, 1994	Embassy Malabo was closed October 31, 1995. Its functions were transferred to the embassy in Yaoundé November 1, 1995. The ambassador to Cameroon was also accredited to Equatorial Guinea while resident in Yaoundé.
Charles H. Twining – Career FSO	Ambassador Extraordinary and Plenipotentiary	December 19, 1995	May 16, 1996	Left Yaoundé August 17, 1998	
John Melvin Yates – Career FSO	Ambassador Extraordinary and Plenipotentiary	October 22, 1998	February 4, 1999	Left Yaoundé November 4, 2001	
George McDade Staples – Career FSO	Ambassador Extraordinary and Plenipotentiary	September 5, 2001	January 24, 2002	Left Yaoundé, July 10, 2004	The embassy in Malabo was reopened in 2004 with the ambassador solely accredited to Equatorial Guinea.
R. Niels Marquardt – Career FSO	Ambassador Extraordinary and Plenipotentiary	July 2, 2004	October 29, 2004	September 26, 2006	
Donald C. Johnson – Career FSO	Ambassador Extraordinary and Plenipotentiary	September 22, 2006	November 23, 2006	November 1, 2008	
Alberto M. Fernandez – Career FSO	Ambassador Extraordinary and Plenipotentiary	December 29, 2009	March 11, 2010	March 18, 2012	
Mark L. Asquino – Career FSO	Ambassador Extraordinary and Plenipotentiary	July 5, 2012	October 4, 2012	September 18, 2015	
Julie Furuta-Toy – Career FSO	Ambassador Extraordinary and Plenipotentiary	October 26, 2015	February 11, 2016	February 25, 2019	
Susan N. Stevenson – Career FSO	Ambassador Extraordinary and Plenipotentiary	January 2, 2019	April 11, 2019	September 30, 2021	
David R. Gilmour – Career FSO	Ambassador Extraordinary and Plenipotentiary	December 18, 2021	May 22, 2022	October 1, 2026	

== See also ==
- Equatorial Guinea – United States relations
- Foreign relations of Equatorial Guinea
- Ambassadors of the United States
