= David M. Ransom =

American diplomat (1938–2003)

United States Ambassador to Bahrain
- In office July 18, 1994 – July 28, 1997
- President: Bill Clinton
- Preceded by: David S. Robins
- Succeeded by: Johnny Young

Personal details
- Born: November 23, 1938 St. Louis, Missouri, U.S.
- Died: December 4, 2003 (aged 65)
- Cause of death: Heart attack
- Education: The Choate School; Princeton University (BA); Paul H. Nitze School of Advanced International Studies (MA)
- Profession: Diplomat

David M. Ransom (November 23, 1938 – December 4, 2003) was an American diplomat. A career Foreign Service officer, he served as U.S. Ambassador to the State of Bahrain from 1994 to 1997.

Ransom was born in St. Louis, Missouri on November 23, 1938. His father was a civil engineer who served as a career military officer. When his father died when he was 14, the family had lived in Greenville, Texas, Japan and Greece. Ransom graduated from The Choate School (1956), Princeton University (BA, 1960) and the Johns Hopkins University School of Advanced International Studies (MA, 1962). Ransom entered the Foreign Service in 1965 and served overseas in Yemen, Iran, Lebanon, Saudi Arabia, the United Arab Emirates, Syria, and Bahrain. He retired from the Foreign Service in 1997.

He died from a heart attack while on a trip to New York City, on December 4, 2003, at the age of 65.

== Career ==
While with the State Department, Ransom was a White House National Security Council staffer from 1973 to 1975, during the Nixon and Ford presidencies, first under both Henry Kissinger and General Brent Scowcroft. From 1978 to 1982, he was assigned to Department of Defense, working as the Director of the Near East, South Asia and Africa Division, serving both the Democrat Harold Brown and Republican Caspar Weinberger. When he retired in 1997, Ransom held the rank of Minister-Counselor in the Senior Foreign Service. He founded DMRansom Associates, an international consulting firm focusing on the Gulf Region.
