= William Witman II =

American diplomat (1914–78)

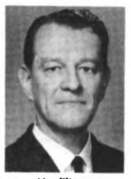

3rd United States Ambassador to Togo
- In office June 8, 1964 – May 8, 1967
- President: Lyndon B. Johnson
- Preceded by: Leon B. Poullada
- Succeeded by: Albert W. Sherer, Jr.

Personal details
- Born: January 31, 1914 Dauphin County, Pennsylvania, U.S.
- Died: March 12, 1978 (aged 64)
- Spouse: Melpomene "Melpo" Sasalios
- Profession: Diplomat

William Witman II (January 31, 1914 – March 12, 1978) was an American diplomat. He graduated from Yale University in 1935 and joined the United States Foreign Service the same year. His first post was as a clerk in the American Legation at Caracas, Venezuela. Witman was officially appointed as a Foreign Service Officer (FSO) in 1939. He subsequently worked in Beirut, Ankara, Athens, and Bombay. In 1963, Witman was awarded the State Department's Superior Service Award. He was appointed as United States Ambassador to Togo in 1964 and served til 1967. He retired from the foreign service in 1974. He married Melpomene "Melpo" Sasalios and died in 1978. His wife died in 2006.

Diplomatic posts
Preceded by Leon B. Poullada	United States Ambassador to Togo; 1964–1967	Succeeded by Albert W. Sherer, Jr.
