= Robert Brendon Keating =

American diplomat (1924–2012)

Robert Brendon Keating (May 7, 1924 – March 4, 2012) was an American diplomat. He was United States Ambassador to Madagascar and Comoros from 1983 to 1986.

Keating was born in Medford, Massachusetts, to parents who emigrated to the United States from Ireland. Keating graduated from the United States Naval Academy of Annapolis in 1947, a year earlier than expected due to an accelerated degree. He served in the United States Navy during the Korean War, reaching the rank of lieutenant commander. Keating later received his master's degree from George Washington University in 1961 (engineering administration).

Keating worked as a consultant for international development after completing his master's degree. He ran a technical cooperation program in Chile from 1964 to 1967. He also spearheaded the construction of roads in Zaire (now the Democratic Republic of Congo) during the early 1970s.

Keating was appointed as a delegate to the United Nations Convention on the Law of the Sea during the 1980s, though the United States did not become a signatory to the treaty. Soon after, U.S. President Ronald Reagan nominated Keating as Ambassador to Madagascar and the Comoros. His nomination came with some controversy surrounding communications between Keating and several mining companies while he was a delegate to the Law of the Sea convention. However, Keating was confirmed by the U.S. Senate and served as ambassador accredited to both island nations from 1983 to 1986.

Keating served as the U.S. executive director of the World Bank from 1986 to 1989. He later became the representative of the United States on the board of directors of the World Bank Group, retiring in 2008 to continue consultancy work.

Keating died in Washington, D.C. of pneumonia on March 4, 2012, at the age of 87. He was survived by his daughter, Anne B. Keating, while his wife, Virginia Wellborn Keating, whom he married in 1959, died in 2006. A longtime Washington resident, he had resided in the Residences at Thomas Circle.

== Notes ==
Diplomatic posts
Preceded by Fernando E. Rondon	United States Ambassador to Madagascar; 1983–1986	Succeeded by Patricia Gates Lynch
