= List of ambassadors of the United States to Togo =

Ambassador of the United States to Togo
- Seal of the United States Department of State

- Flag of a United States ambassador

- Incumbent; Kimberly McClure; Chargé d'affaires ad interim since March 3, 2026
- Nominator: President of the United States
- Inaugural holder: Leland Barrows as Ambassador Extraordinary and Plenipotentiary
- Formation: June 23, 1960
- Website: U.S. Embassy - Lomé

Until 1955 French Togoland was a United Nations Trust Territory mandated by the U.N. to France. In 1955, French Togoland became the administrative Republic of Togo within the French Community (Communauté française), although it retained its UN trusteeship status. In 1960 Togo severed its constitutional ties with France, shed its UN trusteeship status, and became fully independent as the Togolese Republic.

The United States immediately recognized Togo and moved to establish diplomatic relations. The State Department established an embassy in Yaoundé in nearby Cameroon on January 1, 1960, with Bolard More as Chargé d'affaires ad interim. The Yaoundé embassy was simultaneously accredited to Togo. The embassy in Lomé was established on April 27, 1960, with Jesse M. MacKnight as Chargé d’Affaires ad interim. On June 23, 1960, Leland Barrows was appointed as Ambassador Extraordinary and Plenipotentiary to Cameroon with separate accreditation to Togo while remaining resident in Yaoundé. In 1961 a separate ambassador was appointed solely for Togo and resident at Lomé. The United States has maintained diplomatic relations with Togo since that date.

The United States Embassy in Togo is located in Lomé. The current Togolese ambassador to the United States is Limbiye Edawe Kadangha Bariki.

== Ambassadors ==
Name	Title	Appointed	Presented credentials	Terminated mission	Notes
Leland Barrows – Career FSO	Ambassador Extraordinary and Plenipotentiary	June 23, 1960	August 22, 1960	June 27, 1961	
Leon B. Poullada – Career FSO	Ambassador Extraordinary and Plenipotentiary	April 18, 1961	July 27, 1961	February 24, 1964	
William Witman II – Career FSO	Ambassador Extraordinary and Plenipotentiary	June 8, 1964	July 10, 1964	May 8, 1967	
Albert W. Sherer, Jr. – Career FSO	Ambassador Extraordinary and Plenipotentiary	September 13, 1967	October 13, 1967	March 5, 1970	
Dwight Dickinson – Career FSO	Ambassador Extraordinary and Plenipotentiary	September 8, 1970	October 8, 1970	April 3, 1974	
Nancy V. Rawls – Career FSO	Ambassador Extraordinary and Plenipotentiary	February 11, 1974	June 7, 1974	August 8, 1976	
Ronald D. Palmer – Career FSO	Ambassador Extraordinary and Plenipotentiary	September 16, 1976	October 28, 1976	July 15, 1978	
Marilyn P. Johnson – Career FSO	Ambassador Extraordinary and Plenipotentiary	September 23, 1978	November 3, 1978	July 29, 1981	
Howard Kent Walker – Career FSO	Ambassador Extraordinary and Plenipotentiary	March 9, 1982	April 19, 1982	June 9, 1984	
Owen W. Roberts – Career FSO	Ambassador Extraordinary and Plenipotentiary	June 28, 1984	July 31, 1984	July 5, 1986	
David A. Korn – Career FSO	Ambassador Extraordinary and Plenipotentiary	October 16, 1986	November 4, 1986	April 4, 1988	
Rush Walker Taylor, Jr. – Career FSO	Ambassador Extraordinary and Plenipotentiary	April 28, 1988	June 20, 1988	September 4, 1990	
Harmon Elwood Kirby – Career FSO	Ambassador Extraordinary and Plenipotentiary	October 22, 1990	December 3, 1990	July 16, 1994	
Johnny Young – Career FSO	Ambassador Extraordinary and Plenipotentiary	May 9, 1994	October 7, 1994	November 21, 1997	
Brenda Schoonover – Career FSO	Ambassador Extraordinary and Plenipotentiary	November 11, 1997	January 7, 1998	July 30, 2000	
Karl William Hofmann – Career FSO	Ambassador Extraordinary and Plenipotentiary	September 15, 2000	October 17, 2000	December 14, 2002	
Gregory W. Engle – Career FSO	Ambassador Extraordinary and Plenipotentiary	April 16, 2003	May 22, 2003	April 1, 2005	
David B. Dunn – Career FSO	Ambassador Extraordinary and Plenipotentiary	November 2, 2005	February 2, 2006	June 6, 2008	
Patricia McMahon Hawkins - Career FSO	Ambassador Extraordinary and Plenipotentiary	June 6, 2008	September 12, 2008	July 29, 2011	
Robert E. Whitehead - Career FSO	Ambassador Extraordinary and Plenipotentiary	April 2, 2012	May 7, 2012	September 26, 2015	
David R. Gilmour - Career FSO	Ambassador Extraordinary and Plenipotentiary	October 16, 2015	November 7, 2015	March 9, 2019	
Eric W. Stromayer - Career FSO	Ambassador Extraordinary and Plenipotentiary	January 7, 2019	April 11, 2019	March 9, 2022	
Elizabeth Fitzsimmons - Career FSO	Ambassador Extraordinary and Plenipotentiary	December 18, 2021	April 26, 2022	May 30, 2024	
Ronald E. Hawkins Jr - Career FSO	Chargé d'affaires ad interim	May 31, 2024		June 17, 2025	
Richard C. Michaels - Career FSO	Chargé d'affaires ad interim	June 17, 2025		March 2, 2026	
Kimberly McClure - Career FSO	Chargé d'affaires ad interim	March 3, 2026		Present	

== See also ==
- Togo – United States relations
- Foreign relations of Togo
- Ambassadors of the United States
