= Howard Kent Walker =

American diplomat (1935–2025)

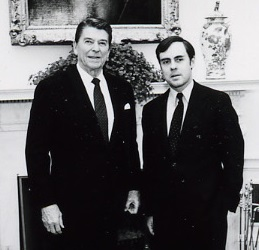
- Howard Kent Walker (r.) and Ronald Reagan in 1982

9th United States Ambassador to Togo
- In office March 9, 1982 – June 9, 1984
- President: Ronald Reagan
- Preceded by: Marilyn P. Johnson
- Succeeded by: Owen W. Roberts

9th United States Ambassador to Madagascar
- In office September 27, 1989 – July 12, 1992
- President: George H. W. Bush
- Preceded by: Patricia Lynch Ewell
- Succeeded by: Dennis P. Barrett

9th United States Ambassador to the Comoros
- In office October 25, 1989 – September 24, 1990
- President: George H. W. Bush
- Preceded by: Patricia Gates Lynch
- Succeeded by: Kenneth N. Peltier

Personal details
- Born: December 3, 1935 Newport News, Virginia, U.S.
- Died: February 19, 2025 (aged 89) Bethesda, Maryland, U.S.
- Spouse: Terry (Taylor) Walker
- Education: University of Michigan
- Profession: Diplomat

Military service
- Branch/service: United States Army
- Years of service: 1962–65
- Rank: First lieutenant

Howard Kent Walker (December 3, 1935 – February 19, 2025) was an American diplomat and foreign service officer who served as United States Ambassador to Togo, Madagascar, and the Comoros.

== Early life and education ==
Walker was born on December 3, 1935, in Newport News, Virginia. He graduated from the University of Michigan with an A.B. in 1957 and M.A. in 1958. He enrolled in the United States Air Force as first lieutenant from 1962 to 65. He graduated from Boston University with a Ph.D. in 1968. He was married, had two children, two grandchildren, and resided in Atlantic City, New Jersey.

== Political career ==
Walker joined the U.S. Department of State and was assigned as a research analyst from 1965 to 1968 and international relations officer of the Office of Inter-African Affairs and principal officer in Kaduna, from 1971 to 1973. From 1973 to 1975 he was in the Department as international relations officer of the Office of West African Affairs. He was counselor for political affairs in Amman, Jordan from 1975 to 1977, Deputy Chief of Mission in Dar es Salaam, Tanzania, from 1977 to 1979, and in 1979, Deputy Chief of Mission in Pretoria, South Africa. In 1982 he became the United States Ambassador to Togo, replacing Marilyn P. Johnson. He left in 1984.

Walker died on February 19, 2025, in Bethesda, Maryland, at the age of 89.

Diplomatic posts
Preceded by Marilyn P. Johnson	United States Ambassador to Togo; 1982–1984	Succeeded by Owen W. Roberts
Preceded by Patricia Gates Lynch	United States Ambassador to Madagascar; 1989–1992	Succeeded by Dennis P. Barrett
