= Albert W. Sherer Jr. =

American diplomat

Albert William Sherer Jr.

4th United States Ambassador to Togo
- In office September 13, 1967 – March 5, 1970
- President: Lyndon B. Johnson; Richard Nixon
- Preceded by: William Witman II
- Succeeded by: Dwight Dickinson

1st United States Ambassador to Equatorial Guinea
- In office September 13, 1967 – March 5, 1970
- President: Lyndon B. Johnson
- Preceded by: office established
- Succeeded by: Lewis Hoffacker

5th United States Ambassador to Guinea
- In office March 31, 1970 – December 21, 1971
- President: Richard Nixon
- Preceded by: Robinson McIlvaine
- Succeeded by: Terence Todman

21st United States Ambassador to Czechoslovakia
- In office February 15, 1972 – July 29, 1975
- President: Richard Nixon
- Preceded by: Malcolm Toon
- Succeeded by: Thomas Ryan Byrne

Personal details
- Born: January 16, 1916 Wheaton, Illinois, U.S.
- Died: December 27, 1986 (aged 70) Chicago, Illinois, U.S.
- Profession: Diplomat

Military service
- Branch/service: United States Army Air Forces
- Years of service: 1941–1945

Albert William Sherer Jr. (January 19, 1916 – December 27, 1986) was an American diplomat.

== Life ==
In 1938 he received a B.A. from Yale University and an LL.B. in 1941 from Harvard University. He served in the U.S. Army Air Force from 1941 to 1945.

In 1946 to 1949 under the U.S. State Department, Sherer was a commercial officer in Tangier, Morocco and he was temporarily assigned to Casablanca, Morocco, as consular and legal officer from 1947 to 1948. After that in 1949 to 1951, he was political officer in Budapest, Hungary.

In 1951 from 1955, Sherer was the Romanian desk officer in the Office of Eastern European Affairs at the State Department. He was political officer in Prague, then Czechoslovakia, from 1955 to 1957 and an officer in charge of Polish, Baltic, and Czech Affairs in the office of Eastern European Affairs from 1957 to 1960.

From 1960 to 1961 he attended the Bowie Seminar for International Affairs at Harvard University. He was Deputy Chief of Mission in Warsaw, Poland, from 1961 to 1966, and appointed Ambassador to Togo from 1967 until 1970. In 1968 and 1969, he was also accredited as Ambassador to Equatorial Guinea. Sherer was also Ambassador to Guinea from 1970 to 1972, Ambassador to Czechoslovakia from 1972 to 1975 and Chief of the U.S. delegation to CSCE from 1974 and 1975.

After ambassadorship, from 1975 to 1977, Sherer was Deputy Representative of the United States in the Security Council of the United Nations. In 1975 he served as Alternate U.S. Representative to the Seventh Special Session and the Thirtieth Session of the United Nations General Assembly, and in 1976 he served as Alternate U.S. Representative to the Thirty-first Session of the General Assembly. In 1977 he was Head of the U.S. delegation to the preparatory meeting in Belgrade, Serbia, of the CSCE.

His daughter Susan Sherer was married to journalist Peter Osnos. His grandson is journalist Evan Osnos.

Diplomatic posts
Preceded by William Witman II	United States Ambassador to Togo; 1967–1970	Succeeded by Dwight Dickinson
Preceded by office established	United States Ambassador to Equatorial Guinea; 1967–1970	Succeeded by Lewis Hoffacker
Preceded by Robinson McIlvaine	United States Ambassador to Guinea; 1970–1971	Succeeded by Terence Todman
Preceded by Malcolm Toon	United States Ambassador to Czechoslovakia; 1972–1975	Succeeded by Thomas R. Byrne
