= Geoff Grant =

Geoffrey Grant may refer to:

- Geoff Grant (tennis) (born 1970), tennis player
- Geoff Grant (footballer) (1914–1973), Australian rules footballer

== See also ==
- Jeff Grant (disambiguation)
