= David B. Dunn =

American diplomat

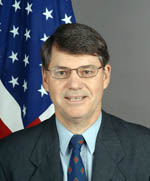

18th United States Ambassador to Togo
- In office October 28, 2005 – August 2008
- President: George W. Bush
- Preceded by: Gregory W. Engle
- Succeeded by: Patricia McMahon Hawkins

12th United States Ambassador to Zambia
- In office July 7, 1999 – July 1, 2002
- President: Bill Clinton; George W. Bush
- Preceded by: Arlene Render
- Succeeded by: Martin George Brennan

Personal details
- Born: June 19, 1949 (age 77) Great Falls, Montana
- Spouse: Maria-Elena Dunn
- Profession: Diplomat

David B. Dunn (born 1949) is an American diplomat. He was the United States Ambassador to Togo from 2005 to 2008. He also served as United States Ambassador to Zambia from 1999 to 2002.

== Biography ==
Dunn was born in Great Falls, Montana. He is a graduate of Occidental College and holds master's degrees from American University and the National War College. Dunn is married to Maria-Elena Dubourt and has two sons, Tom and Brian.

He joined the Foreign Service in 1978. Early assignments included Jamaica, Tunisia, France, and Washington, D.C. Since 1988, he has been engaged with Africa, serving in Burundi, Mauritius, Tanzania, Zambia, South Africa, and Togo, and as deputy director and director of the State Department's Office of East African Affairs. He was appointed as Ambassador to Zambia by President Clinton, where he served from 1999 to 2002. From 2002 to 2005 he served as Principal Officer at the Consulate General in Johannesburg, South Africa. After George W. Bush was elected in 2000, Bush nominated Dunn as Ambassador to Togo on September 6, 2005, and he was confirmed by the United States Congress on October 28, 2005. He was superseded by Patricia McMahon Hawkins on August 22, 2008, as the ambassador to Togo. Following Togo, Dunn was assigned as a faculty member at the National War College, where he also served as Deputy Commandant. Shortly after his retirement at the end of 2010, Dunn was directed by President Barack Obama to return to service to perform the duties of the Alternate Representative for Special Political Affairs at the United States Mission to the United Nations in New York, a position he held for seven months. He returned to the same position in 2014, and in 2015 he returned once again as Acting U.S. Representative for Economic and Social Affairs.

He currently resides in Prescott, Arizona with his family, when not working.

== See also ==
- United States Ambassador to Togo
- United States Ambassador to Zambia

Diplomatic posts
Preceded by Gregory W. Engle	United States Ambassador to Togo; 2005–2008	Succeeded by Patricia McMahon Hawkins
Preceded by Arlene Render	United States Ambassador to Zambia; 1999–2002	Succeeded by Martin George Brennan
