= Harmon Elwood Kirby =

American diplomat

13th United States Ambassador to Togo
- In office October 22, 1990 – July 16, 1994
- President: George H. W. Bush; Bill Clinton
- Preceded by: Rush Walker Taylor, Jr.
- Succeeded by: Johnny Young

Personal details
- Born: January 27, 1934 Hamilton, Ohio
- Died: May 21, 2014 (aged 80)
- Profession: Diplomat

Harmon Elwood Kirby (January 27, 1934 – May 21, 2014) was an American diplomat, U.S. Ambassador to Togo, and Foreign Service Officer. He was appointed to that position on October 22, 1990, and left his post on July 16, 1994.

Kirby received his Bachelor of Arts (BA) degree from Harvard University and his Master of Arts (MA) degree from George Washington University. Harmon was enrolled in the U.S. Army from 1956 to 1958.

Kirby served many positions such as the Director of United Nations Political Affairs at the U.S. Department of State. He was a Foreign Service officer in Geneva, Madras, New Delhi, Brussels, Khartoum, Rabat, and Washington, D.C., as of 1961. In addition, Mr. Kirby served as an executive assistant to the executive vice president of Hudson Pulp and Paper Corp. in New York City from 1960 to 1961, and in personnel and labor relations for the Diamond National Corp. in Middletown, Ohio, from 1959 to 1960.

He was married, had two children, and resided in Bethesda, Maryland.

Diplomatic posts
Preceded by Rush Walker Taylor, Jr.	United States Ambassador to Togo; 1990–1994	Succeeded by Johnny Young
