= Owen W. Roberts =

American diplomat

10th United States Ambassador to Togo
- In office June 28, 1984 – July 5, 1986
- President: Ronald Reagan
- Preceded by: Howard Kent Walker
- Succeeded by: David A. Korn

Personal details
- Born: March 29, 1924 Ardmore, Oklahoma, U.S.
- Died: June 10, 2017 (aged 93) Redwood City, California, U.S.
- Spouse: Janet Read Kiehel Roberts
- Profession: Diplomat

Military service
- Branch/service: United States Army
- Years of service: 1943–46

Owen W. Roberts (March 29, 1924 – June 10, 2017) was an American diplomat who served as the United States Ambassador to Togo from June 28, 1984, to July 5, 1986.

Roberts was born in Ardmore, Oklahoma. He graduated from Princeton University in 1948 and Columbia University in 1955 with an M.A. and Ph.D. He can speak French and German, as well as English.

Roberts served in the United States Army from 1943 to 1946. In 1949 Roberts married Janet Roberts. In 1955, he entered the Foreign Service as consular officer in Cairo, Egypt, and was commercial officer in Leopoldville from 1958 to 1960. In the Department he was desk officer for Africa in the Bureau of Intelligence and Research (1961 to 1962), and in the Bureau of International Organization Affairs (1963 to 1964). He was political officer in Lagos from 1964 to 1965, and deputy chief of mission in Ouagadougou, Burkina Faso from 1966 to 1968. He attended the Air War College from 1969 to 1970. In the Department he was staff director of the Board of Examiners for the Foreign Service from 1970 to 1971, Deputy Director for Cultural Affairs for Africa, from 1971 to 1972, a member of the policy planning staff in 1973, and Executive Director of the Office of Inspector General from 1974 to 1975. From 1976 to 1978, he was Deputy Director of the Sinai Field Mission, Sinai Desert. He was Director of the African Office at the Department of Defense from 1978 to 1979, and deputy chief of mission in Addis Ababa, Ethiopia, from 1979 to 1982. In 1983 he served as African adviser to the United Nations General Assembly. From 1982 to 1984, he was roving Charge in Victoria in the Seychelles, Banjul, The Gambia, and then N'Djamena, Chad. In May 1984 Roberts was appointed Ambassador to the Republic of Togo, and held that post through September 1986. Owen retired in 1989 and died in June 2017 at the age of 93.

== Family ==
Roberts married Janet Read Kiehel Roberts in 1949. She was born in Philadelphia, Pennsylvania, in 1926. She attended Vassar College and graduated in 1947 with a focus on creative writing and social anthropology.

== See also ==
- United States Ambassador to Togo

Diplomatic posts
Preceded by Howard Kent Walker	United States Ambassador to Togo; 1984–1986	Succeeded by David A. Korn
