= David R. Gilmour =

American diplomat (born 1958)

David Gilmour
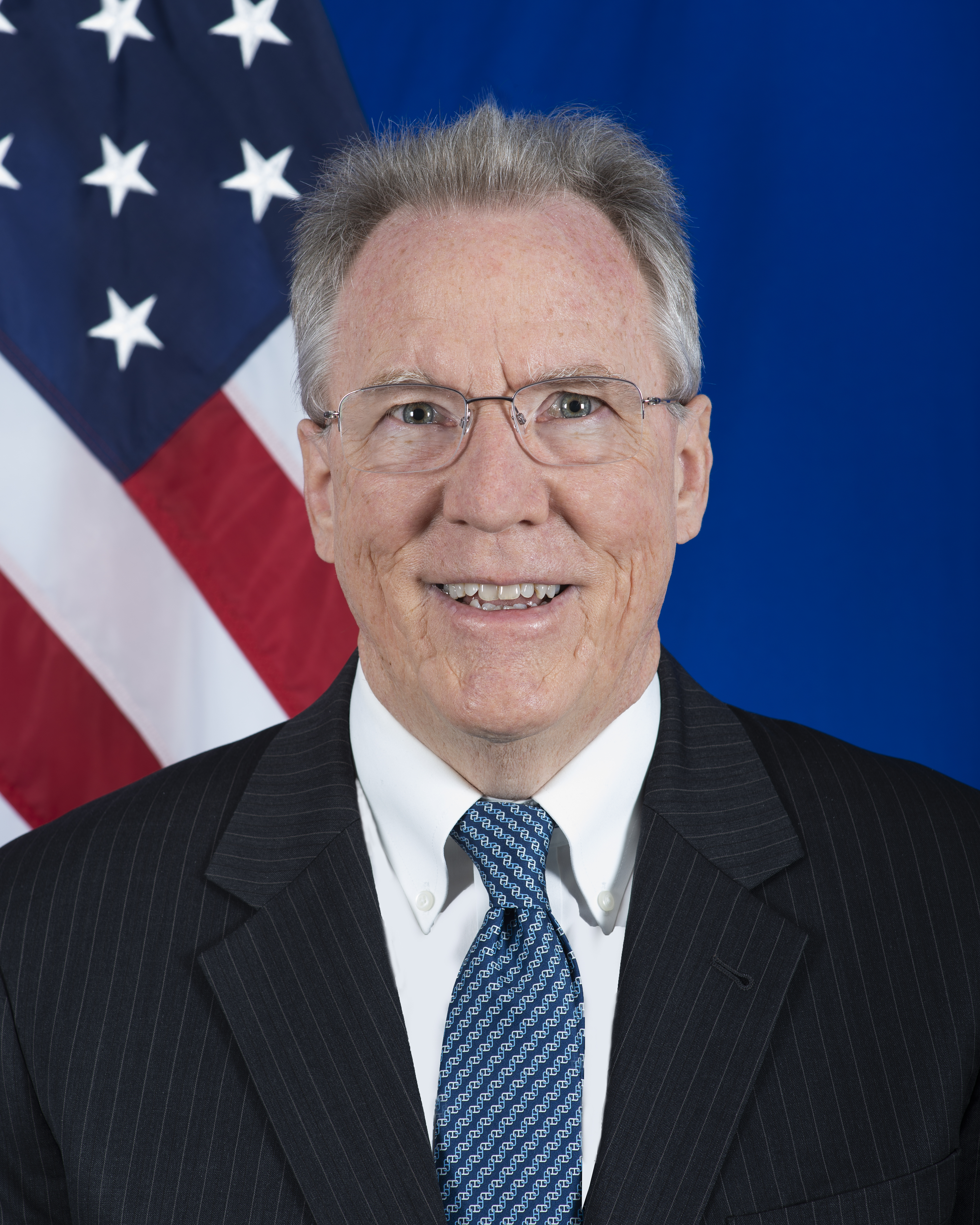

United States Ambassador to Equatorial Guinea
- In office May 22, 2022 – October 1, 2026
- President: Joe Biden; Donald Trump
- Preceded by: Susan N. Stevenson

United States Ambassador to Togo
- In office November 7, 2015 – March 9, 2019
- President: Barack Obama; Donald Trump
- Preceded by: Robert E. Whitehead
- Succeeded by: Eric Stromayer

Personal details
- Born: 1958 (age 67–68)
- Spouse: Judith Martin
- Children: 3
- Education: Saginaw Valley State University (BA); University of Texas at Austin (MA)

David R. Gilmour (born 1958) is an American diplomat who had served as the United States Ambassador to Equatorial Guinea.

== Early life and education ==
Gilmour was raised in Bridgeport, Michigan, where he attended Bridgeport High School. He earned a Bachelor of Arts degree from Saginaw Valley State University and a Master of Arts from the University of Texas at Austin.

== Career ==
Gilmour is a career member of the Senior Foreign Service, with the rank of Minister-Counselor. He was the Chargé d’Affaires a.i. at the U.S. Embassy in N’Djamena, Chad. He has served in the Bureau of African Affairs at the Department of State as Deputy Assistant Secretary for Central Africa, Director of East African Affairs, and Director of Public Diplomacy for Africa. He was Deputy Chief of Mission at the U.S. embassies in Panama and Malawi, and Counselor for Public Affairs at the U.S. Mission in Geneva. Other overseas assignments have included Australia, Costa Rica, South Africa, and Cameroon.

=== Ambassador to Togo ===
Gilmour was the United States ambassador to Togo from November 7, 2015, to March 9, 2019.

=== Ambassador to Equatorial Guinea ===
On August 6, 2021, President Joe Biden nominated Gilmour to be the U.S. ambassador to Equatorial Guinea. The Senate Foreign Relations Committee held hearings on his nomination on October 20, 2021. The committee reported the nomination favorably on November 3, 2021. On December 18, 2021, Gilmour was confirmed by the Senate via voice vote. He presented his credentials to President Teodoro Obiang Nguema Mbasogo on May 22, 2022.

== Personal life ==
Gilmour speaks French and Spanish.

Diplomatic posts
Preceded by Robert E. Whitehead	United States Ambassador to Togo; 2015–2019	Succeeded by Eric Stromayer
Preceded by Susan N. Stevenson	United States Ambassador to Equatorial Guinea; 2022–present	Incumbent
