= Leon B. Poullada =

American diplomat (1913–1987)

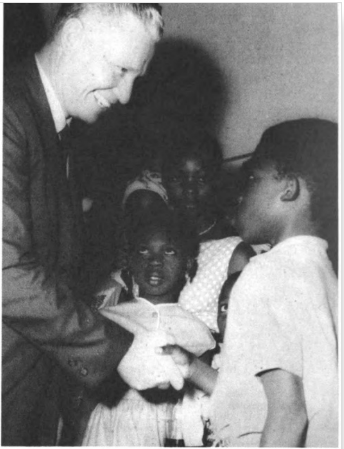
- Poullada shakes hands with a young Togolese honor student at Fourth of July party in Lomé

2nd United States Ambassador to Togo
- In office April 18, 1961 – February 24, 1964
- President: John F. Kennedy; Lyndon B. Johnson
- Preceded by: Leland Barrows
- Succeeded by: William Witman II

Personal details
- Born: April 13, 1913
- Died: July 17, 1987 (aged 74) St. Paul, Minnesota, U.S.
- Spouse: Leila Jackson Poullada
- Children: 3
- Profession: Diplomat

Leon Baqueiro Poullada (April 13, 1913 – July 17, 1987) was an American diplomat, the son of a Mexican immigrant medical doctor, and served as an Ambassador to Togo under the Kennedy Administration.

== Career ==
At the end of World War Two, Major Poullada participated as Legal Counsel at the Nuremberg Trials.

In his 17-year diplomatic career, Poullada served in Ceylon, Pakistan and Afghanistan before President Kennedy nominated him as Ambassador to the nation of Togo in 1961. In 1963, while Poullada was still the ambassador, Togo's President, Sylvanus Olympio, was assassinated at the United States Embassy gates.

After retiring in 1965 from the Foreign Service, Poullada began studies at Princeton University for a doctorate in political science, he specialized in Afghan history. His dissertation, titled "Reform and Rebellion in Afghanistan, 1919–1929", a study of Afghan history between 1919 and 1929, was published in 1972 by Cornell University Press. The book is a case history analysis of King Amanullah of Afghanistan's failure to modernize a tribal society.

Poullada taught political science at the Northern Arizona University at Flagstaff and lectured around the country on Afghanistan and United States diplomacy. After the Soviet invasion of Afghanistan in 1979, he helped organize efforts to aid the Afghan guerrillas.

== Personal life ==
He married Leila Jackson Poullada, and had two sons, Peter Poullada of Istanbul, Turkey, and Philip Poullada of Port Washington, New York, as well as a daughter, Sofia Poullada of Saratoga, California, a granddaughter, Roxana Safipour, and a grandson, Noveed Safipour.

He died of prostate cancer at his home in St. Paul, Minnesota at age 74 in 1987.

Diplomatic posts
Preceded by Leland Barrows	United States Ambassador to Togo; 1961–1964	Succeeded by William Witman II
