= Karl W. Hofmann =

American diplomat and CEO

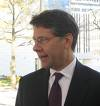

16th United States Ambassador to Togo
- In office October 17, 2000 – December 14, 2002
- President: Bill Clinton; George W. Bush
- Preceded by: Brenda Schoonover
- Succeeded by: Gregory W. Engle

20th Executive Secretary of the United States Department of State
- In office 2002–2005
- Preceded by: Maura Ann Harty
- Succeeded by: Harry K. Thomas Jr.

Personal details
- Born: April 6, 1961 (age 65) Redwood City, California
- Profession: Diplomat, CEO/President of Population Services International

Karl William Hofmann (born April 6, 1961) is the president and CEO of the global humanitarian and health organization, Population Services International (PSI). Prior to joining PSI, he served as an American diplomat for 23 years. His missions included a two-year appointment to the Republic of Togo, where he served as the United States Ambassador. He also served as a member of President Clinton's National Security Council.

As of 2012, Hofmann is a director of the US Global Leadership Coalition, a member of the American Academy of Diplomacy, and a member of the Board of Advisors of Pennsylvania State University's School of International Affairs. He is the recipient of the US State Department's Distinguished Honor Award, Superior Honor Award, and Meritorious Honor Award.

== Personal background ==
Karl W. Hofmann was born on April 6, 1961, in Redwood City, California. He graduated from Georgetown University and the National War College in Washington, D.C. He is fluent in French, Spanish and German.

== Professional background ==
=== US Department of State ===
Hofmann served in diplomatic service for the US for 23 years, holding a variety of positions at the Department of State. He began his career with the State Department in 1983. Throughout his diplomatic career, he has lived in the US, Africa, and the Caribbean. His career has additionally taken him to posts located in Kingston, Jamaica; Kigali, Rwanda; Rabat, Morocco; and Maseru, Lesotho.

On September 15, 2000, Hofmann was appointed as a Foreign Service Officer to serve as the United States Ambassador to the Republic of Togo. As Ambassador Extraordinary and Plenipotentiary, he served in Togo through December 14, 2002. That same week, on December 19, 2002, Hofmann transferred within the Department of State, serving in a senior role as the Special Assistant to the Secretary and Executive Secretary of the Department, which encompasses the leadership of the Executive Secretariat, with the support of four Deputy Executive Secretaries.

In 2006, Hofmann began serving as the Deputy Chief of Mission (DCM) at the American Embassy in Paris. He served as the second-in-command to Craig Roberts Stapleton, Ambassador to France. In his role, Hofmann served as the chief of staff and was responsible for the day-to-day management of the Embassy. He oversaw the heads of each office, including the Consular; Political; Economic-Environment, Science, Technology and Health Section; Public Affairs; and Management sections.

=== Population Services International ===
In February 2007, Hofmann became CEO and President of Population Services International (PSI), a global non-governmental, nonprofit organization, designed to enable low-income and vulnerable people to lead healthier lives. As of 2012, PSI is operating in over 60 countries around the world, working to address healthcare in poverty-rich areas and countries, while delivering health products, services, and programs focusing on malaria prevention, reproductive health, child survival, and HIV prevention. Since Hofmann became the CEO of PSI, the organization was honored with the largest single grant ever offered for reproductive health work, while additionally receiving nearly $1 billion from The Global Fund to Fight AIDS, Tuberculosis and Malaria.

== Board and committee memberships ==
- US Global Leadership Coalition
- American Academy of Diplomacy
- Pennsylvania State University's School of International Affairs
- One Acre Fund, Governing Board

== Honors and awards ==
Hofmann is the recipient of the State Department's Distinguished Honor Award, Superior Honor Award (1994), and Meritorious Honor Award (1987 and 1990).

Diplomatic posts
Preceded by Brenda Schoonover	United States Ambassador to Togo; 2000–2002	Succeeded by Gregory W. Engle
