= Gregory W. Engle =

American diplomat

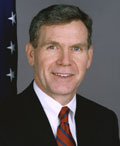

17th United States Ambassador to Togo
- In office May 22, 2003 – April 1, 2005
- President: George W. Bush
- Preceded by: Karl William Hofmann
- Succeeded by: David B. Dunn

Personal details
- Born: 1954 (age 71–72) Germany
- Spouse: Maureen Engle
- Profession: Diplomat

Gregory W. Engle (born 1954) is a United States Diplomat and former U.S. Ambassador to Togo. He was sworn in as ambassador on May 12, 2003. Greg Engle retired from the U.S. Foreign Service in 2008 and currently lives in Austin, Texas, where he teaches at the University of Texas and pursues his musical interests as a singer-songwriter. In January 2010, he released his first album, "Take It Personally," with noted producer/musician Stephen Doster and several well known Austin musicians. His song "Woody's Ghost" won first prize at the Annual Woody Guthrie Folk Festival Songwriting Competition in 2011.

Gregory Engle was born in Germany where his father was serving in the U.S. Air Force. He spent much of his childhood in Colorado, Germany and Pennsylvania and received a B.A. in Political Science and an MPA from the University of Colorado at Colorado Springs.

Engle joined the Foreign Service (U.S. Department of State) in 1981, following a tour as a Peace Corps Volunteer in Korea. He has served in management positions in Pakistan, Germany, Washington, Ethiopia, and Cyprus. He received the State Department's Leamon R. Hunt Award for Administrative Achievement in 1990.

Following his assignments in Cyprus, Engle served as Deputy Chief of Mission at the U.S. Embassy in Lilongwe, Malawi, from 1992 to 1995. After leaving Malawi, he was a member of the Foreign Service Institute's 38th Senior Seminar. Then from 1996 to 1999 he was the U.S. Consul General in Johannesburg, South Africa.

Following his assignment in South Africa, he returned to Washington where he served as Director of the International Cooperative Administrative Support Services (ICASS) system from 1999 to 2001. In 2001, Engle became the Special Coordinator of the African Crisis Response Initiative. That program was merged into the Office of Regional and Security Affairs in the Bureau of African Affairs at the U.S. Department of Statein 2002, and Engle became the director.

In May 2003, Engle was sworn in as the U.S. Ambassador to the Togolese Republic and assumed charge of the U.S. Embassy in Lome. In June 2005, he became the Minister Counselor for Management Affairs of the U.S. Embassy in Baghdad, where he served until July 2006.

Following his assignment in Baghdad, Ambassador Engle served as the U.S. Department of State's Diplomat-in-Residence at the Lyndon B. Johnson School of Public Affairs at the University of Texas at Austin (UT-Austin). He retired from the U.S. Foreign Service in April 2008 and became the Senior Advisor for International Affairs at UT-Austin's International Office, where he served until April 2009, when he assumed his duties as the Associate Director of UT-Austin's Robert S. Strauss Center for International Security and Law. In June 2010, he retired from that position to pursue musical and charitable interests. He was a member of the adjunct faculty at the Lyndon B. Johnson School of Public Affairs, where he teaches a course in international management. In 2012, he became the Country Director for Peace Corps Ethiopia.

He is married and has two children.

== See also ==
- United States Ambassador to Togo

Diplomatic posts
Preceded by Karl W. Hofmann	United States Ambassador to Togo; 2003–2005	Succeeded by David B. Dunn
