= Elizabeth Fitzsimmons =

American diplomat

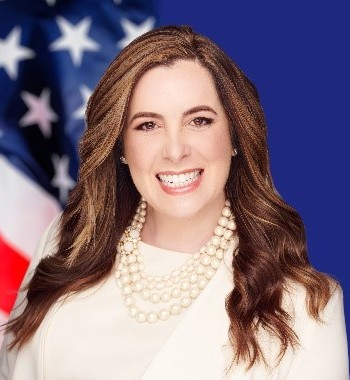

United States Ambassador to Togo
- In office April 26, 2022 – May 30, 2024
- President: Joe Biden
- Preceded by: Eric Stromayer

Personal details
- Born: Elizabeth Anne Noseworthy; 1972 or 1973 (age 52–53)
- Education: University of Virginia (BA)

Elizabeth Anne Noseworthy Fitzsimmons (born 1972/1973) is an American diplomat who had served as the United States Ambassador to Togo. She has serve Principal Deputy Assistant Secretary for Conflict and Stabilization Operations since August 12, 2024.

== Education ==
Fitzsimmons earned a Bachelor of Arts from the University of Virginia. She also holds a certificate from the International Division of Waseda University, Tokyo, Japan 1993.

== Career ==
Fitzsimmons is a career member of the Senior Foreign Service, class of Minister-Counselor. She has served overseas in Taiwan, Hong Kong, Cambodia, India and Bulgaria. She has also worked in the State Department's Operations Center and as Deputy Director of the State Department's Executive Secretariat. Other assignments included being deputy executive secretary to Secretaries John Kerry and Rex Tillerson, senior advisor at the Foreign Service Institute, Deputy Assistant Secretary for East Asian and Pacific Affairs (Public Diplomacy) in the Bureau of South and Central Asian Affairs, and the Office of the Special Representative for Afghanistan and Pakistan. From October 1, 2018, to 2021, she served as Deputy Assistant Secretary of State for Central Africa and Public Diplomacy. Prior to that, she was Acting Deputy Spokesperson for the Department. From January to September 2021, she served as the Acting Principal Deputy Assistant Secretary for the Bureau of African Affairs.

=== United States ambassador to Togo ===
On August 4, 2021, President Joe Biden nominated Fitzsimmons to be the next United States Ambassador to Togo. The Senate Foreign Relations Committee held hearings on her nomination on October 20, 2021. The committee reported her favorably to the Senate floor on November 3, 2021. On December 18, 2021, the United States Senate confirmed her nomination by voice vote. She presented her credentials to President Faure Gnassingbé on April 26, 2022.

== Personal life ==
Elizabeth Anne Noseworthy married Trevor Morrison Fitzsimmons on November 27, 1999. Their marriage ended in divorce. In 2011 she married Diplomatic Security Special Agent Richard Seipert and the two have five children. Her father was the associate medical director and the chief of surgery at the Nemours Children's Clinic in Jacksonville. Her mother was the president of the Delaware Symphony from 1993 to 1995 and its chairwoman in 1995 and 1996.

Fitzsimmons speaks Bulgarian, French and Chinese. She is a member of the Church of Jesus Christ of Latter-day Saints.

== See also ==
- List of ambassadors of the United States
- A Love Letter to the State Department by Elizabeth Fitzsimmons
- A Practical Guide to International Divorce in the Foreign Service by Elizabeth Fitzsimmons
- What I’m Wearing: A State Department Senior Staffer With a Side Hustle as a Personal Stylist - Washingtonian

Diplomatic posts
Preceded by Eric Stromayer	United States Ambassador to Togo; 2022–2024	Vacant
