= Eric Stromayer =

American diplomat (born 1960)

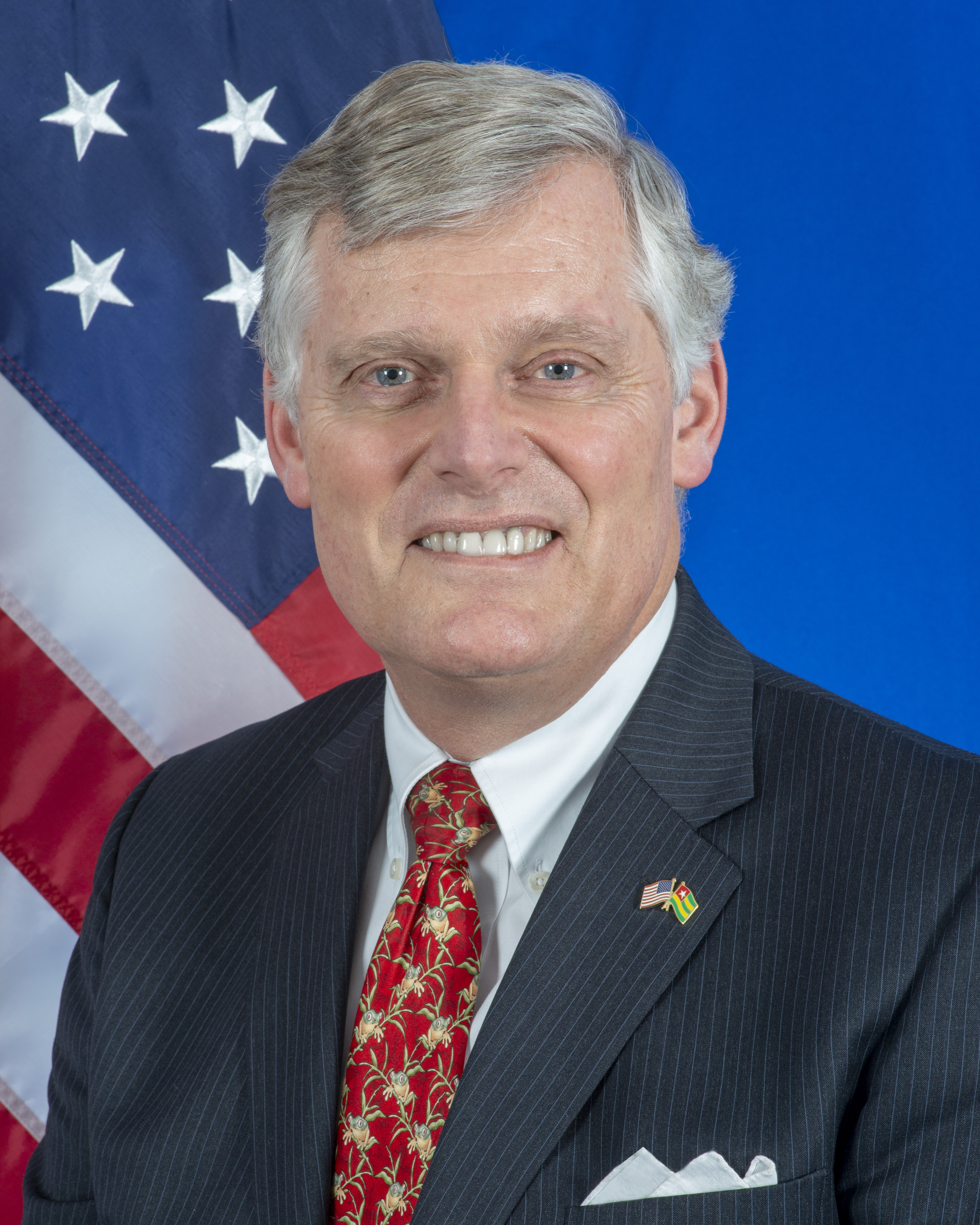

United States Ambassador to Togo
- In office April 11, 2019 – March 9, 2022
- President: Donald Trump; Joe Biden
- Preceded by: David R. Gilmour
- Succeeded by: Elizabeth Fitzsimmons

Personal details
- Born: 1960 (age 65–66)
- Education: Northwestern University (BA); Johns Hopkins School of Advanced International Studies (MA)

Eric William Stromayer (born 1960) is an American diplomat who served as the United States ambassador to Togo from 2019 until 2022 and he had served the Chargé d'Affaires ad interim to Haiti.

== Education ==
Stromayer earned a Bachelor of Arts from Northwestern University and a Master of Arts from Johns Hopkins School of Advanced International Studies.

== Career ==
Stromayer is a career member of the Senior Foreign Service, class of Minister-Counselor. He has served as an American diplomat since 1989. He has served six tours at U.S. Missions overseas and in senior leadership positions at the United States Department of State, including as Chargé d'Affaires and Deputy Chief of Mission in Madagascar, Executive Director of the Bureau of African Affairs, Desk Officer at the Office of West African Affairs in the Bureau of African Affairs, and as General Services Officer at the U.S. Embassy in Ouagadougou, Burkina Faso. Recently he served as Acting Deputy Assistant Secretary for East Africa and the Sudans in the Bureau of African Affairs at the Department of State.

On August 16, 2018, President Donald Trump announced his intent to nominate Stromayer as the next United States Ambassador to Togo. On August 21, 2018, his nomination was sent to the United States Senate. On January 2, 2019, his nomination was confirmed in the United States Senate by voice vote. On April 11, 2019, he presented his credentials to President Faure Gnassingbé. He left the country on March 9, 2022. Stromayer has been Chargé d'Affaires to Haiti since July 3, 2022. On January 29, 2024, Haitian-American rapper Wyclef Jean sampled remarks from Stromayer in a song titled "Kreyòl Pale, Kreyòl Konprann."

== Personal life ==
Stromayer speaks French, Italian, Hungarian, Wolof, Haitian Creole, and some Spanish.

Diplomatic posts
Preceded by David R. Gilmour	United States Ambassador to Togo; 2019–2022	Succeeded by Elizabeth Fitzsimmons
