= Chester E. Norris =

American ambassador

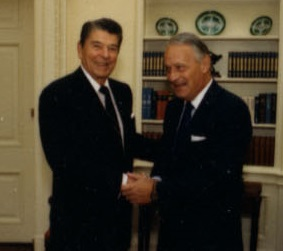
- 1988, right

Personal details
- Born: December 1, 1927 Bangor, Maine, United States
- Died: November 15, 2016 (aged 88) Naples, Florida, United States
- Education: University of Maine; National War College

Chester Edward Norris, Jr. (December 1, 1927 – November 15, 2016) was U.S. Ambassador to Equatorial Guinea from 1988 to 1992. His tenure there saw the first contracts negotiated between American energy corporations and the EG government, a process that would make EG a site of vital interest to the US, and transform it into a major African oil producer. The main street in the wealthiest suburb of the capital, Malabo, is named Chester E. Norris Avenue in recognition of his relationship with the regime of President Teodoro Obiang Nguema Mbasago. A tanker owned by the Malabo-based firm Atlantic Methanol Production Company is also named the Ambassador Norris in his honor.

Norris was born in Bangor, Maine, and attended the University of Maine, from which he graduated in 1951. He also attended the US Maritime Academy and later the National War College. Norris joined the US Foreign Service in 1965 and had postings in Saudi Arabia, Australia, the U.K., and Israel. In 1982-86 he was Counselor for Economic Affairs at the US Embassy in Lagos, and in 1987 was appointed Deputy U.S. Representative on the Economic and Social Council of the United Nations.

Since retiring from his ambassadorship and the foreign service, Norris has been a consultant for Ocean Energy, a firm involved in oil drilling in EG. He has also been controversial as an "Obiang admirer" to quote one business publication. Norris has been quoted as saying that President Obiang "really wants to bring about democracy and improve the human rights record" in EG, and conditions under him are "already pretty good." Obiang's bad press, Norris went on, is due to misinformation in the Spanish press, reflecting that country's jealousy of American oil corporations' exclusive contracts with the Obiang government. Obiang has been widely condemned in even the American press, however, for being one of Africa's worst despots with one of the worst human rights records on the continent. Norris' predecessor as US Ambassador, Francis "Frank" Ruddy, has called the Obiang regime "a corrupt, rotten government", while Norris' successor, Ambassador John E. Bennett, left the country on receiving death threats after calling for improvements in human rights conditions. Norris died on November 15, 2016, in Naples, Florida.

Diplomatic posts
Preceded by Francis S. Ruddy	United States Ambassador to Equatorial Guinea; 1988–1991	Succeeded by John E. Bennett
