= Marilyn P. Johnson =

American diplomat (1922–2022)

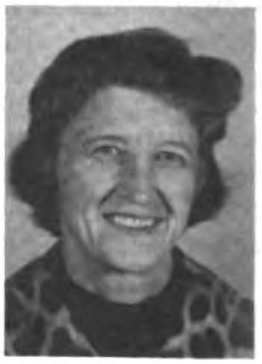

8th United States Ambassador to Togo
- In office September 23, 1978 – July 29, 1981
- President: Jimmy Carter; Ronald Reagan
- Preceded by: Ronald D. Palmer
- Succeeded by: Howard Kent Walker

Personal details
- Born: Marilyn Priscilla Johnson; June 19, 1922 Boston, Massachusetts, U.S.
- Died: September 19, 2022 (aged 100) Bethlehem, New Hampshire, U.S.
- Profession: Diplomat

Military service
- Branch/service: United States Navy
- Years of service: 1944–1946

Marilyn Priscilla Johnson (June 19, 1922 – September 19, 2022) was an American diplomat who served as United States Ambassador to Togo. She was appointed to that position on September 23, 1978, and left her post on July 29, 1981.

She graduated from Radcliffe College with a Bachelor of Arts in 1944 and from Middlebury College in 1952 with an Master of Arts She joined the U.S. Navy and served as a lieutenant from 1944 to 1946 as a WAVES.

From 1952 and 1959, Johnson taught French at high schools. She was a Fulbright scholar in France from 1957 to 1959, and a Smith-Mundt grantee in Guinea from 1960 to 1961. Between 1962 and 1964, she taught English as a foreign language in various schools inside Cameroon and Mali. She joined the Foreign Service in 1964, and was a cultural affairs officer in Bamako, Mali, and Tunis, Tunisia, as well as public affairs officer in Niamey, Niger.

From 1971 to 1974, Johnson was the Deputy Assistant Director of the Information Centers Program. The following year, she attended the Senior Seminar in Foreign Policy, and from 1975 to 1976 she learned Russian through training. In 1976 she was cultural affairs officer in Moscow, Soviet Union. In September 1978 she was assigned as United States Ambassador to the Republic of Togo until July 1981.

Johnson died at her home in Bethlehem, New Hampshire, on September 19, 2022, at the age of 100.

Diplomatic posts
Preceded by Ronald D. Palmer	United States Ambassador to Togo; 1978–1981	Succeeded by Howard Kent Walker
