= Ray Schoonover =

Ray Schoonover may refer to:

- Ray Schoonover (comics), Marvel Comics character
- Ray H. Schoonover (1896–1966), American businessman and politician
