= Barry B. White =

American lawyer and former ambassador (born 1943)

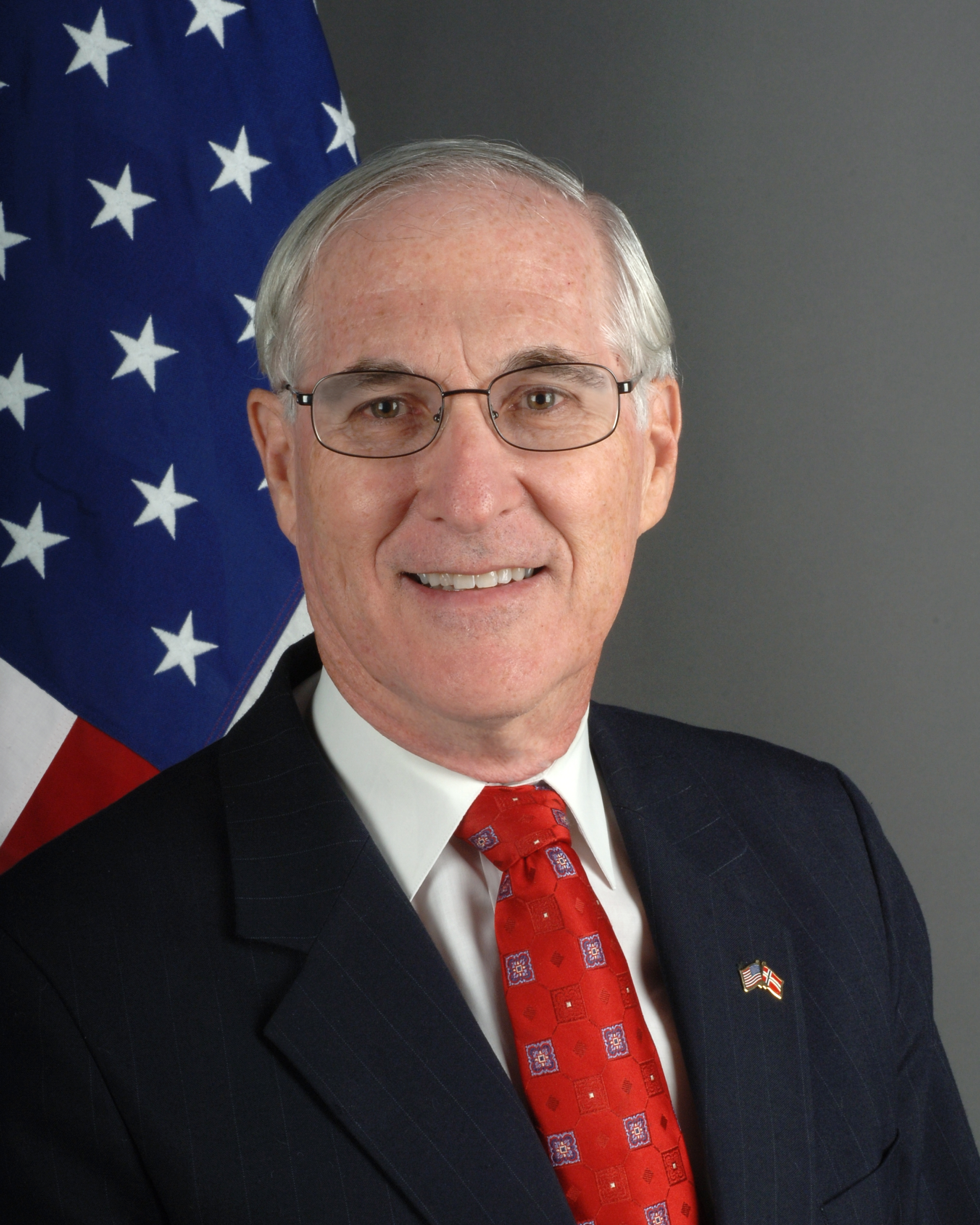

United States Ambassador to Norway
- In office November 5, 2009 – September 27, 2013
- President: Barack Obama
- Preceded by: Benson K. Whitney
- Succeeded by: Julie Furuta-Toy (Acting)

Personal details
- Born: 1943 (age 82–83)
- Party: Democratic
- Spouse: Eleanor G. White
- Children: 3
- Education: Harvard College; Harvard Law School
- Occupation: Ambassador
- Profession: Jurist

Barry B. White (born 1943) is an American lawyer and former ambassador. He served as United States Ambassador to Norway from 2009 to 2013.

== Education ==
White holds an A.B. from Harvard College, magna cum laude and Phi Beta Kappa, and a J.D. from Harvard Law School, magna cum laude, where he was an Editor of the Harvard Law Review.

White was commissioned as a Lieutenant in the United States Public Health Service and served from 1967 to 1969 in the legislative liaison office in the Office of the Surgeon General at the United States Department of Health, Education and Welfare.

== Foley Hoag and Lex Mundi ==
Prior to his appointment as ambassador, White served for over 13 years as chairman and managing partner (CEO) of Foley Hoag LLP, where he was a senior partner in the firm's business, corporate, international and government strategies practice areas. He practised law at Foley Hoag for 40 years. He also served as chair of Lex Mundi, the world's largest international association of independent law firms, and co-founded the "Lex Mundi Pro Bono Foundation", to provide pro bono legal advice to social entrepreneurs around the world.

== Organizations and boards ==
White has served as secretary, general counsel and member of the executive committee of the Greater Boston Chamber of Commerce and as a director of the Massachusetts Alliance for International Business. He was active with many organizations and boards, including the American Bar Association, as a member of the Business and International Sections; Edgewater Technology; the Initiative for a Competitive Inner City; the Boston Municipal Research Bureau; the Northeastern University School of Social Science, Public Policy and Urban Affairs; the Massachusetts Association for Mental Health; the Boston University Goldman School of Dental Medicine; and several others.

== Ambassador to Norway ==
White was confirmed as ambassador to Norway by the United States Senate on September 22, 2009, and was sworn in as ambassador on October 21, 2009. In a confirmation hearing before the Senate Foreign Relations Committee on September 15, 2009, White emphasized the commitment shared by Norway and the U.S. to promoting human rights, democracy, and freedom throughout the world. He said that he looked forward to working to preserve and build upon this invaluable relationship, and to increase economic development opportunities both for U.S. companies in Norway and Norwegian firms in the United States. He left his position as ambassador in September 2013.

== Personal life ==
White is married to Eleanor G. White, an affordable housing expert. They have three sons, two granddaughters, and one grandson. In 2005, he and his wife were awarded the American Jewish Committee of New England's Award for Community Service.

Diplomatic posts
Preceded by Benson K. Whitney	U.S. Ambassador to Norway; 2009–2013	Succeeded by Julie Furuta-Toy
