= Susan N. Stevenson =

American diplomat

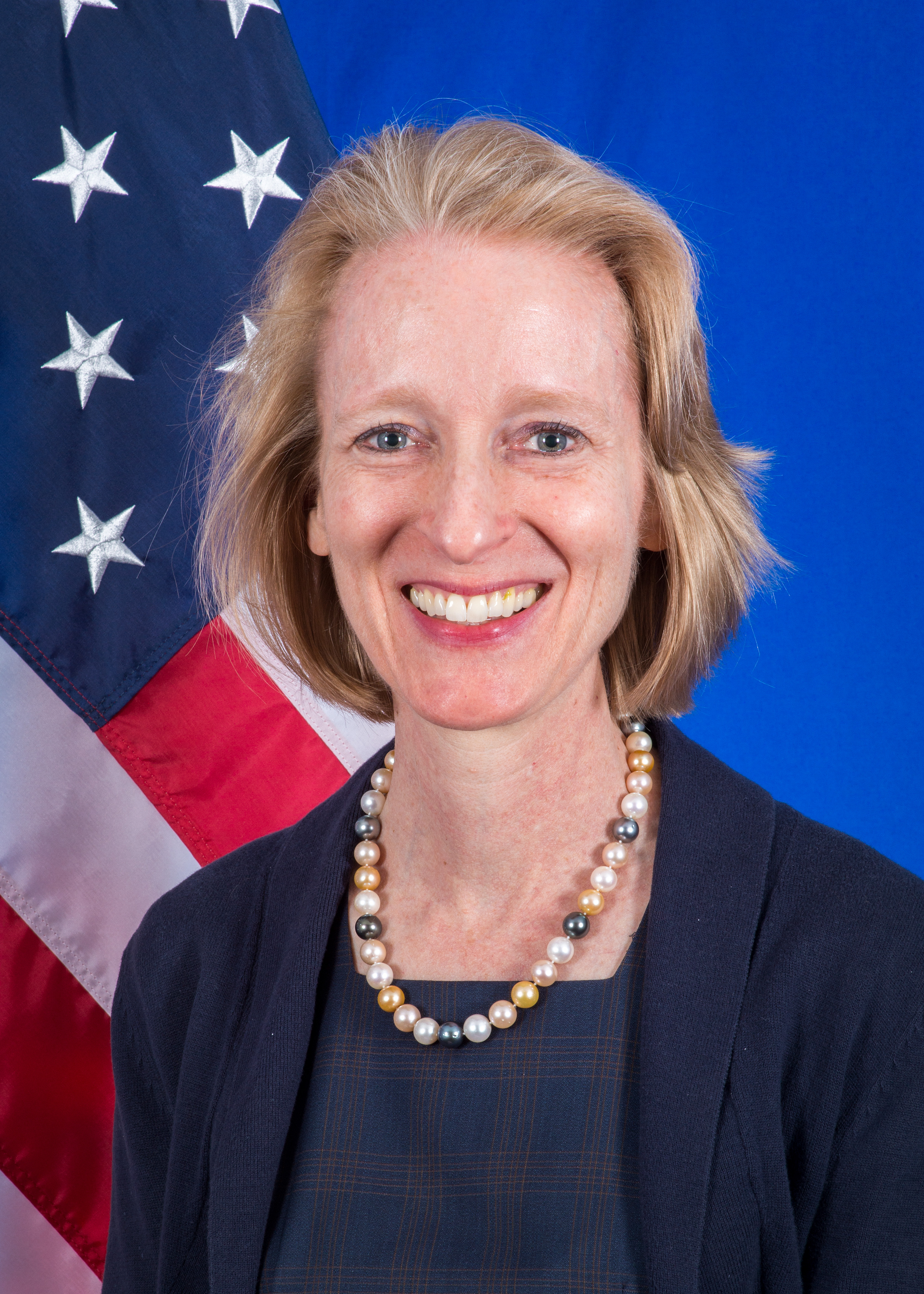

Principal Deputy Assistant Secretary for Intelligence and Research
- In office October 1, 2021 – June 30, 2023
- President: Joe Biden
- Preceded by: Kin W. Moy
- Succeeded by: Lisa D. Kenna

United States Ambassador to Equatorial Guinea
- In office April 11, 2019 – September 30, 2021
- President: Donald Trump; Joe Biden
- Preceded by: Julie Furuta-Toy
- Succeeded by: David R. Gilmour

Deputy Assistant Secretary for East Asian and Pacific Affairs (Public Diplomacy)
- In office 2012–2014
- Preceded by: Jennifer Park Stout
- Succeeded by: Kristie Kenney

Personal details
- Education: University of Pennsylvania (BS, BA)

Susan N. Stevenson

United States Ambassador to Burma
- In office July 10, 2023 (Chargé d'Affaires) – January 14, 2026
- President: Joe Biden; Donald Trump
- Preceded by: Thomas Vajda

Susan Nan Stevenson is an American diplomat and career member of the Senior Foreign Service who had served as Principal Deputy Assistant Secretary in the Bureau of Intelligence and Research from October 2021 to June 2023. She previously served as the United States ambassador to Equatorial Guinea from 2019 to 2021.

== Early life and education ==
Stevenson earned both a Bachelor of Science and a Bachelor of Arts in multinational management and French from the Wharton School of the University of Pennsylvania. She speaks Mandarin Chinese, French, Spanish, and Thai.

== Career ==
Early in her career Stevenson worked in product management for the Kellogg Company, including as Category Brand Manager for Children's Cereal, Kellogg's Produits Alimentaires in France.

Stevenson joined the Foreign Service in 1992. Her international assignments have included Beijing, Hong Kong, Mexico City and Bangkok. She served as the assistant press officer for e-media at the United States Embassy Bangkok from 1994 to 1997, assistant cultural officer for economic affairs at the United States Embassy Mexico City from 1998 to 2000, spokesperson and press officer at the United States Consulate General Hong Kong from 2002 to 2006, and spokesperson for the United States Embassy Beijing from 2006 to 2010. She assumed her post as United States Consul General in Chiang Mai, Thailand, from 2010 to 2012. Stevenson served the State Department in senior positions for the Under Secretary of State for Public Diplomacy from 2014 to 2016 and in the Bureaus of East Asian and Pacific Affairs as Deputy Assistant Secretary (for Public Diplomacy) from 2012 to 2014. She then served as Principal Deputy Assistant Secretary in the State Department's Bureau of Public Affairs.

Stevenson was nominated by President Donald Trump on September 13, 2018, and was confirmed as ambassador to the Republic of Equatorial Guinea on January 2, 2019. She left her post in September 30, 2021.

Stevenson joined the Bureau of Intelligence and Research as the Principal Deputy Assistant Secretary in October 2021. She is Chargé d'Affaires Burma since July 10, 2023.

== Personal life ==
Stevenson speaks Mandarin Chinese, French, Spanish, and Thai.

== See also ==
- List of ambassadors appointed by Donald Trump

Diplomatic posts
Preceded by Julie Furuta-Toy	United States Ambassador to Equatorial Guinea; 2019–2021	Succeeded by David R. Gilmour
