= Patricia Lynch Ewell =

American diplomat

Patricia Gates Lynch Ewell (born Patricia Ann Lawrence; April 20, 1926 – December 4, 2011) was a post-war NBC news correspondent in Europe but was known to much of the world as the host of the "Breakfast Show" on the English language service of the Voice of America during the 1960s and 70s. Ewell was also a United States Ambassador to Madagascar and the Comoros (1986–89) and served as Press Secretary to First Lady Pat Nixon. She was a member of the American Academy of Diplomacy and vice-president of the Council of American Ambassadors. She was born in Newark, New Jersey and died in Fairfax, Virginia, of ovarian cancer.

== Bibliography ==
- Thanks for Listening: High Adventures in Journalism and Diplomacy. Bloomfield Hills, Michigan: Countinghouse Press. 2008. ISBN 978-0-9786191-2-1.

Diplomatic posts
Preceded by Robert B. Keating	United States Ambassador to Madagascar; 1986–1989	Succeeded by Howard K. Walker
