= Evan Osnos =

American journalist and author (born 1976)

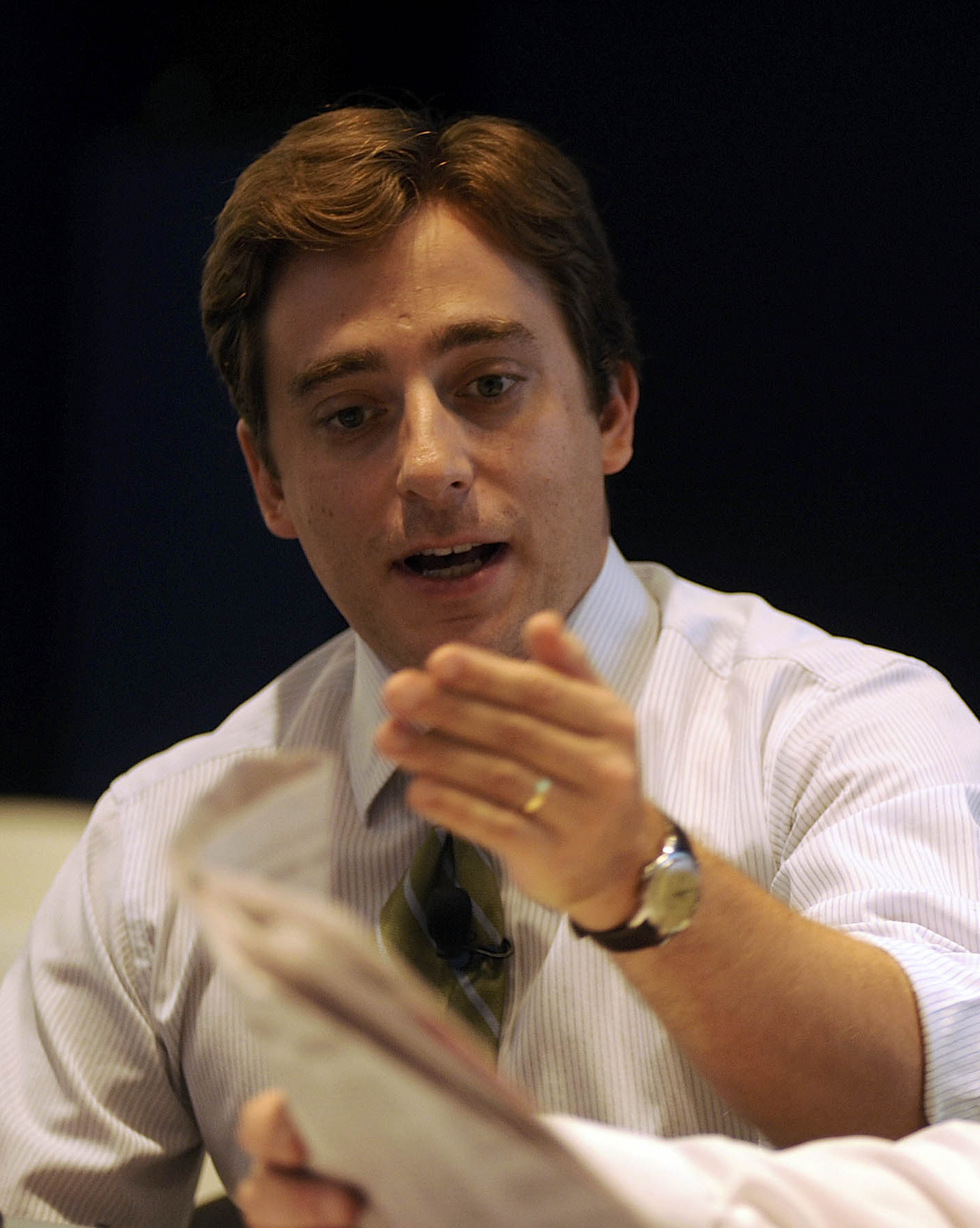
- Osnos at the World Economic Forum Annual Meeting of the New Champions in 2011
- Born: Evan Lionel Richard Osnos; December 24, 1976 (age 49); London, England
- Other name: 欧逸文
- Education: Harvard University (AB)
- Occupation: Journalist
- Employer: The New Yorker
- Spouse: Sarabeth Berman
- Children: 2
- Parents: Peter L. W. Osnos (father); Susan Osnos (mother)
- Relatives: Katherine Osnos Sanford (Sister) Ruth E. Nemzoff (Mother-in-law) Harris Berman (Father-in-law)
- Awards: National Book Award for Nonfiction
- Website: https://www.evanosnos.com

Evan Lionel Richard Osnos (born December 24, 1976) is an American journalist and author. He has been a staff writer at The New Yorker since 2008, best known for his coverage of politics and foreign affairs, in the United States and China, and, since 2016, his coverage of the world's wealthiest individuals. His 2014 book, Age of Ambition: Chasing Fortune, Truth, and Faith in the New China, won the National Book Award for nonfiction.

In October 2020 he published a biography of Joe Biden, entitled Joe Biden: The Life, the Run, and What Matters Now. In September 2021, he published Wildland: The Making of America's Fury, about profound cultural and political changes occurring between September 11, 2001, and January 6, 2021, as evidenced by the turmoil of 2020.

== Early life and education ==
Osnos was born in London, when his parents, Susan (née Sherer) Osnos and Peter L.W. Osnos, were visiting from Moscow, where his father was assigned as a correspondent for The Washington Post.

Osnos' father was a Jewish refugee from Poland born in India when his family was en route to the U.S. His mother was the daughter of diplomat Albert W. Sherer Jr.

Osnos was raised in Greenwich, Connecticut, and graduated from Greenwich High School in 1994. He then attended Harvard University, where he wrote for The Harvard Crimson and graduated in 1998 magna cum laude with a Bachelor of Arts in government.

== Career ==
In the summer of 1999, Osnos joined the Chicago Tribune as a metro reporter, and, later, a national and foreign correspondent. He was based in New York at the time of the September 11 attacks. In 2002, he was assigned to the Middle East, where he covered the Iraq War and reported from Egypt, Saudi Arabia, Syria, Iran, and elsewhere. In 2005, he became the China correspondent. He was a guest on the Colbert Report in 2007 and 2011 to discuss China's changes. He was part of a Chicago Tribune team that won the 2008 Pulitzer Prize for Investigative Reporting.

Osnos joined The New Yorker in September 2008 and served as the magazine's China correspondent until 2013. In this role, Evan maintained a regular blog called "Letter from China" and wrote articles about China's young neoconservatives, the Fukushima nuclear meltdown, and the Wenzhou train crash. According to The Washington Post, "In the pages of the New Yorker, Evan Osnos has portrayed, explained and poked fun at this new China better than any other writer from the West or the East." He received two awards from the Overseas Press Club and the Osborn Elliott Prize for excellence in journalism from the Asia Society. Since returning from China, Osnos has covered topics including politics, foreign affairs, white collar crime, and espionage, including high-profile interviews with American President Joe Biden, White Collar Support Group founder Jeffrey Grant, and Chinese President Xi Jinping.

Osnos has contributed to the NPR radio show This American Life and the PBS television show Frontline.

Age of Ambition: Chasing Fortune, Truth, and Faith in the New China (2014), Osnos' first book, follows the lives of individuals swept up in China's "radical transformation", Osnos said, in an interview on Fresh Air in June 2014. He said Chinese Communist Party leaders abandoned "the scripture of socialism and they held on to the saints of socialism." In addition to the National Book Award, the book was a finalist for the Pulitzer Prize in nonfiction. Osnos left China in 2013, to write about politics and foreign affairs at The New Yorker. Among other topics, he examined the politics behind a chemical leak in West Virginia and twice profiled Vice President Joe Biden, which became the basis for a book. According to Publishers Weekly, his book, Joe Biden constituted "a portrait of the candidate that's smart and evocative."

Wildland: The Making of America's Fury (2021) follows three dissimilar communities in the US and demonstrates how their interconnections reveal "seismic changes in American politics and culture." The book, a New York Times bestseller, focused on a period of political dissolution bounded by the terrorist attacks of 2001 and the assault on the Capitol on January 6, 2021.

== Personal life ==
Osnos is married to Sarabeth Berman, a graduate of Barnard College. Since July 2013, they have lived in Washington, D.C. with their two children. Osnos' Chinese name is 欧逸文 (Ōu Yìwén). His father, Peter Osnos, is founder and editor-at-large of PublicAffairs, a publishing company.

== Bibliography ==
=== Books ===
- Osnos, Evan (2014). Age of ambition : chasing fortune, truth, and faith in the new China. New York: Farrar, Straus and Giroux.
- — (2020). Joe Biden : the life, the run, and what matters now. New York: Scribner.
- — (2021). Wildland : the making of America's fury. New York: Farrar, Straus and Giroux.
- — (2025). The haves and have-yachts : dispatches on the ultrarich. New York: Scribner.

=== Essays and reporting ===
- Osnos, Evan (February 4, 2008). "The boxing rebellion". The Sporting Scene. The New Yorker.
- — (April 28, 2008). "Crazy English". Letter from China. The New Yorker.
- — (May 24, 2010). "It's not beautiful : an artist takes on the system". Profiles. The New Yorker. 86 (14): 54–63. (Note: Profiles Chinese artist Ai Weiwei.)
- — (December 16, 2013). "Strong vanilla : the relentless rise of Kirsten Gillibrand". Profiles. The New Yorker. 89 (41): 40–46.
- — (July 28, 2014). "The Biden agenda". The Political Scene. The New Yorker. 90 (21): 40–53.
- — (December 22–29, 2014). "In the land of the possible : Samantha Power has the President's ear. To what end?". Profiles. The New Yorker. 90 (41): 90–94, 96–107.
- — (April 6, 2015). "Born Red". Profiles. The New Yorker. 91 (7): 42–55.
- — (February 29, 2016). "Father Mike : a militant white priest fights for his black parishioners on the South Side". Letter from Chicago. The New Yorker. 92 (3): 36–45. (Note: Profiles Rev. Michael Pfleger, activist priest.)
- — (December 19–26, 2016). "Xu Hongci". Visionaries. The New Yorker. 92 (42): 94. (Note: Online version is titled "When tyranny takes hold".)
- — (May 8, 2017). "Endgames : what would it take to cut short Trump's Presidency?". The Political Scene. The New Yorker. 93 (12): 34–45. (Note: Online version is titled "How Trump could get fired".)
- — (July 3, 2017). "Homecoming". The Talk of the Town. Wind on Capitol Hill. The New Yorker. 93 (19): 18–19. (Note: Online version is titled "The diplomat who defied the Administration".)
- Entous, Adam & Evan Osnos (January 29, 2018). "Soft target". The Political Scene. The New Yorker. 94 (4). (Note: Online version is titled "Jared Kushner is China's trump card".)
- Osnos, Evan (May 21, 2018). "Only the best people". The Political Scene. The New Yorker. 94 (14): 56–65.
- — (June 18, 2018). "Kim's Chinese lessons". The Talk of the Town. Comment. The New Yorker. 94 (17): 13–14.
- — (September 17, 2018). "Ghost in the machine : can Mark Zuckerberg fix Facebook before it breaks democracy?". Profiles. The New Yorker. 94 (28): 32–47. (Note: Online version is titled "Can Mark Zuckerberg fix Facebook before it breaks democracy?".)
- — (January 13, 2020). "Fight fight, talk talk : the future of America's contest with China". A Reporter at Large. The New Yorker. 95 (44): 32–45. (Note: Online version is titled "The future of America's contest with China".)
- — (May 3, 2020). "How Greenwich Republicans Learned to Love Trump: To understand the President's path to the 2020 election, look at what he has provided the country's executive class". NewYorker.com.
- — (April 26 – May 3, 2021). "Unpacking the Court". The Talk of the Town. Comment. The New Yorker. 97 (10): 19, 22. (Note: Online version is titled "Biden inherits F.D.R.'s Supreme Court problem".)
- "Wes Moore Would Like to Make History", The New Yorker, July 9, 2023.
- "China's Age of Malaise", The New Yorker, October 23, 2023.
- "Ruling-Class Rules: How to thrive in the power elite – while declaring it your enemy", The New Yorker, January 29, 2024, pp. 18–23.
- "Oligarch-in-Chief: The greed of the Trump Administration has galvanized America's ultra-rich – and their opponents", The New Yorker, 2 June 2025, pp. 32–39.
- "The Future, Made in China: Beijing is competing with the U.S. for tech supremacy. Who wins will have huge political implications", The New Yorker, 10 August 2026, pp. 26–37.

=== Interviews ===
- "A 'New Yorker' writer's take on China's 'Age of Ambition'". Fresh Air (Transcript of radio program). Interviewed by Dave Davies. NPR. June 3, 2014.

———————

Bibliography notes
