= Cynthia Shepard Perry =

American diplomat (1928–2024)

Dr. Cynthia Norton Shepard Perry
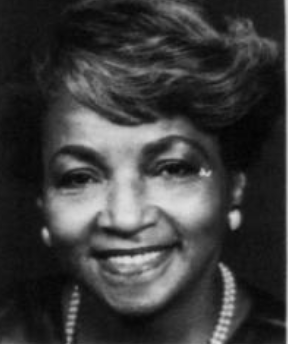

10th United States Ambassador to Sierra Leone
- In office November 20, 1986 – August 30, 1989
- President: Ronald Reagan
- Preceded by: Arthur Winston Lewis
- Succeeded by: Johnny Young

11th United States Ambassador to Burundi
- In office February 12, 1990 – February 28, 1993
- President: George H. W. Bush
- Preceded by: James Daniel Phillips
- Succeeded by: Bob Krueger

Personal details
- Born: Cynthia Helena Norton; November 11, 1928 Burnett, Indiana, U.S.
- Died: June 13, 2024 (aged 95)
- Party: Republican
- Spouse(s): James Otto Shepard (m. 1946; div. 1971) James Olden Perry (m. 1971; died 2006)
- Children: Donna, Jim, Milo, Paula, Mark, James
- Parents: George Norton (father); Flossi Phillips (mother)
- Education: Ed.D. University of Massachusetts
- Alma mater: B.A. Indiana State University
- Occupation: Diplomat, Professor, Banker
- Known for: Expertise in Africa and education

Dr. Cynthia Helena Shepard Perry (née Norton; November 11, 1928 – June 13, 2024) was an American diplomat and educator. She served as Presidential appointed U.S. Ambassador to Sierra Leone and Burundi and as the American Executive Director of the African Development Bank. Being appointed as a diplomat for three U.S. Presidents (Ronald Reagan,George H. W. Bush, & George W. Bush) throughout her career Perry promoted racial and gender equality, international cooperation, and African economic development.

== Early life ==
Perry was born on November 11, 1928 in the mining town of Burnett, Indiana near Terre Haute, Indiana. She grew up in a segregated community called Lost Creek, Indiana, near Terre Haute, the sixth of nine children. She was one of the few blacks who graduated from Otter Creek High School in 1946. Perry credits her white high school principal with laying out for her what she needed to do to accomplish her dream of becoming an ambassador.

Cynthia married James Shepard, a mechanic, after graduating from high school. She worked for a bank and for IBM, developing skills. The couple started a family.

== Education ==
Cynthia Shepard won a scholarship to Indiana State University and completed a B.A. in political science from the university in 1968.

In 1968 she joined the University of Massachusetts' Center for International Education to study for a doctorate in education, which she completed in 1972. For her doctoral degree, Perry proposed to improve race relations by developing African Studies curricula for public schools. She had never been to Africa, so she recruited over 30 former Peace Corps volunteers who had served in Africa to develop and test African Studies curricula using their own first-hand experience and the latest research into black history and affective education.

== Career ==
Armed with a Doctorate in International Education, (Ed.D.) Cynthia Shepherd Perry moved between academe, consulting, and diplomacy depending upon which political party was in power. She honed her leadership skills in increasingly responsible positions, culminating in two challenging ambassadorships and an international development bank position under three Republican presidents.

Before starting doctoral work Perry already had secretarial, banking, and computer skills because of work she had done while attending school and raising her children. While working on her doctorate, she managed 34 returned Peace Corps volunteers and coordinated with the Public Schools of Worcester, Mass. She served as director of the National Teacher Corps at the University of Massachusetts Amherst. She also helped graduates of her program get jobs as teachers, and oversaw those who worked training teachers for The Federal Desegregation Center in Miami.

In 1969 Perry visited Africa for the first time when she accompanied students from Colby College to Ethiopia and Kenya on a summer secretarial training project. The trip was part of the Operation Crossroads Africa project at the University of Nairobi.

In 1973, Perry returned to Africa for three years with her second husband, Dr. J.O.Perry, who had taken a position with UNESCO at the University of Nairobi in Kenya. During his three-year tenure, she trained Peace Corps paramedical volunteers, lectured at the University, and served as a consultant to the United States Information Agency in Kenya, Nigeria, and Zambia. In 1974, She served as a member of diplomatic delegations to Sierra Leone, Ghana, Nigeria, and Liberia. In 1976, she was appointed to the staff of the United Nations Economic Commission for Africa in Addis Abba, Ethiopia.

Perry and her husband returned to Texas in 1978 and she was appointed dean of international affairs at Texas Southern University, a position she held until 1982.

== United States government service ==
In 1982, President Ronald Reagan appointed Perry chief of the Education and Human Resources Division in the Africa Bureau of the U.S. Agency for International Development. She was responsible for establishing policies and educational programs for 43 sub-Saharan African nations receiving United States assistance at the time.

== Presidential appointments ==
=== U.S. Ambassador to Sierra Leone ===
In 1986, President Ronald Reagan appointed Perry U.S. Ambassador to Sierra Leone. She presented her credentials on November 20, 1986, and served until August 30, 1989.

=== U.S. Ambassador to Burundi ===
On November 7, 1989, President George H. W. Bush announced his intention to nominate Perry as U.S. Ambassador Extraordinary and Plenipotentiary to Burundi.

She began her assignment on February 12, 1990, and served until February 28, 1993. Perry discussed her diplomatic career and assignments in an oral-history interview conducted by the Association for Diplomatic Studies and Training.

=== United States Director of the African Development Bank ===
In July 2001, President George W. Bush announced his intention to nominate Perry to serve a five-year term as United States Director of the African Development Bank.

Her nomination was sent to the United States Senate on September 10, 2001, and she was confirmed on November 15, 2001.

Perry served through 2007, representing United States interests in an institution responsible for supporting economic and social development across Africa. She initially worked from the bank’s headquarters in Abidjan, Côte d’Ivoire, and later in Tunis, Tunisia.

Together, these appointments reflected Perry’s experience in African education, diplomacy, international development, and United States–Africa relations.

== Later career ==
Following the completion of her service as U.S. Ambassador to Burundi, Perry returned to academic, corporate, and international-development work. In 1993, she returned to Texas Southern University.

Perry served on the Texas Woman’s University Board of Regents from 1996 to 2001.

During this period, she also worked as director of International Investment Advisory Services for FCA Corporation in Houston and served as honorary consul general of Senegal.

Following her service with the African Development Bank, Perry retired and returned to Houston, where she continued supporting educational, diplomatic, and development initiatives involving Africa. In 1998, Perry published her memoirs, All Things Being Equal: One Woman's Journey.

=== Awards and honorary degrees ===
1987 – Indiana State University Distinguished Alumni Award.

1987 – NAACP President's Award.

1988 – Honorary Doctor of Public Service from the University of Massachusetts Amherst.

2002 – University of Massachusetts Amherst Distinguished Alumni Award.

2014 – University of Massachusetts Amherst Salute to Service Award, recognizing outstanding contributions to civic engagement and public service.

2015 – United Nations Association Global Impact Award.

=== Honors and distinctions ===
First African American woman to hold the position as a U.S. Ambassador for two separate countries Sierra Leone & Burundi

First woman to earn a doctorate from the International Education program at the University of Massachusetts Amherst.

Served as Honorary Consul General of Senegal. Appointed Honorary Consul General of Rwanda by President Paul Kagame and confirmed by the United States Department of State.

Lifetime member of Delta Sigma Theta.

2021 Indiana State University Honored Cynthia Shepard Perry with a street naming ceremony proclaimed “Ambassador Cynthia Shepard Perry Way.”

Honored posthumously when the City of Houston declared June 29, 2024, a day of remembrance recognizing her contributions to diplomatic relations between Houston and African countries.

The Ambassador Cynthia Shepard Perry Award was established at the University of Massachusetts Amherst to support international fieldwork by graduate students.

== Personal life and death ==
In November 1946, Perry married James Shepard, a mechanic. When she was invited to join the postgraduate program in Massachusetts in 1968, her husband, hoping to keep her home, demanded a divorce. Her divorce from Shepard was finalized in 1971, and she married James Olden (J.O.) Perry; he died in 2006.

Perry died June 13, 2024, at the age of 95.

== General and cited references ==
- Perry, Cynthia Shepard, interviewed by Crystal Mikel-Reynolds, Dr. Cynthia Shepard Perry: A Sycamore Destined for Greatness, Indiana State U., 2017.
- Perry, Cynthia Shepard, interviewed by Charles Stuart Kennedy starting March 21, 1999, Interview with Cynthia S. Perry, Association for Diplomatic Studies and Training (ADST), Foreign Affairs Oral History Project, copyright 2000, FAOH, accessed March 9, 2019.
