= Peter Osnos =

American journalist and publisher (born 1943)

Peter L.W. Osnos
- Born: October 13, 1943 (age 83); India
- Occupations: Journalist, Publisher
- Spouse: Susan Sherer Osnos
- Children: Evan Osnos; Katherine Osnos Sanford
- Relatives: Albert W. Sherer Jr. (father-in-law)

Peter L.W. Osnos (born October 13, 1943) is an American journalist and publisher, who founded PublicAffairs Books.

== Early life ==
Osnos was born in India to a Jewish refugee family from Warsaw, Poland. He is the son of Joseph Osnos and Marta Osnos, who later settled in New York. Osnos graduated from Brandeis University and the Columbia Graduate School of Journalism.

== Career ==
In 1965, Osnos began his journalism career as an editorial assistant to investigative journalist I. F. Stone on his weekly newsletter. From 1966 to 1984, Osnos worked for The Washington Post; he was a foreign correspondent in Vietnam, the Soviet Union, and the United Kingdom, and he also served as foreign editor and national editor. Osnos was a regular commentator for National Public Radio's Morning Edition and co-host of Communiqué.

== Publishing ==
In 1984, he joined Random House, where he worked until 1996 as a senior editor, vice president, and associate publisher, and as publisher of the Times Books division. In 1997, he founded PublicAffairs. He served as Publisher and CEO until 2005 and, then, as Consulting Editor until December 31, 2020. Authors he has published or edited include Jane Alexander, Jeff Bezos, former President Jimmy Carter, Rosalynn Carter, Sid Caesar, Wesley Clark, Clark Clifford, former President Bill Clinton, Leonard Downie, Jr., Paul Farmer, Earvin (Magic) Johnson, Kareem Abdul Jabbar, Sam Donaldson, Kenneth Feinberg, Annette Gordon Reed, Meg Greenfield, Richard Holbrooke, Dorothy Height, Don Hewitt, Molly Ivins, Vernon Jordan, Murray Kempton, Wendy Kopp, Charles Krauthammer, Brian Lamb, Jim Lehrer, Scott McClellan, Robert McNamara, Charles Morris, Peggy Noonan, William Novak, former President Barack Obama, former Speaker of the House Tip O’Neill, Charles Peters, Nancy Reagan, Andy Rooney, Morley Safer, Natan Sharansky, George Soros, Susan Swain, former President Donald Trump, Paul Volcker, Juan Williams, James Wolfensohn, former Russian president Boris Yeltsin, and Nobel Peace Prize winner Muhammad Yunus.

== Writing ==
From 2006 to 2014, he wrote the Platform column for the Century Foundation, which was published by The Daily Beast and The Atlantic. From 2017 to 2022, his Platform column was published on Medium. In January 2022, Osnos launched the newsletter which became Peter Osnos Public Affairs Press, published on Substack.

His memoir An Especially Good View: Watching History Happen was published in 2021. He was the editor of a book of biographical essays, titled George Soros: A Life in Full, published in March 2022. In March 2023, he published Would You Believe...The Helsinki Accords Changed the World?: Advancing Human Rights and, for Decades, Security in Europe, with Holly Cartner. LBJ and McNamara: The Vietnam Partnership Destined to Fail, adapted from an 18-part series Osnos published on Platform, was published in November 2024 by Rivertowns Books. The audiobook, augmented with original recordings, was produced by Simon & Schuster in January 2025.

He has served on the board of directors of Human Rights Watch, and, from 2005 to 2009, he was executive director of The Caravan Project, a non-profit organization that supported the simultaneous publishing of books in audio, digital, and print formats. He was Vice-Chairman of the Columbia Journalism Review from 2007 to 2012. In 2020, he and his wife Susan co-founded Platform Books LLC.

== Personal ==
Osnos lives in Bethesda, Maryland, with his wife Susan Sherer Osnos, who has served as chair of the board of the Center for Civilians in Conflict. She is a daughter of diplomat Albert W. Sherer Jr. He has two children: Katherine Osnos Sanford and journalist Evan Osnos; and five grandchildren.

== Works ==
- An Especially Good View: Watching History Happen, Platform Books, 2021. ISBN 9781735996806
- George Soros: A Life in Full, 2022. Harvard Business Review Press/Platform Books. ISBN 978-1647822798
- Would You Believe...The Helsinki Accords Changed the World?: Advancing Human Rights and, for Decades, Security in Europe, Platform Books, 2023. ISBN 978-1735996899
- LBJ and McNamara: The Vietnam Partnership Destined to Fail. ISBN ISBN 978-1-953943-55-2
