= Rush Walker Taylor Jr. =

American diplomat

12th United States Ambassador to Togo
- In office April 28, 1988 – September 4, 1990
- President: Ronald Reagan; George H. W. Bush
- Preceded by: David A. Korn
- Succeeded by: Harmon Elwood Kirby

Personal details
- Born: November 3, 1934 Little Rock, Arkansas, US
- Died: March 7, 2010 Arlington, Virginia, US
- Spouse: Joanna Bellows
- Children: Four
- Profession: Diplomat

Military service
- Branch/service: United States Army
- Years of service: 1959–1961

Rush Walker Taylor Jr. (November 3, 1934 – March 7, 2010) was a U.S. diplomat and former United States Ambassador to Togo. He was appointed to that position on April 28, 1988, and left his post on September 4, 1990.

Taylor graduated from Harvard University in 1956 and the University of Virginia Law School in 1959. He enrolled in the United States Army from 1959 to 1961.

Taylor joined the Foreign Service in 1962. He served as third secretary and vice consul to Yaoundé, Cameroon, from 1962 to 1964; staff assistant to the Ambassador, Rome, Italy, from 1965 to 1966; and vice consul, Florence, Italy, from 1966 to 1967. He returned to Washington, D.C. in 1967 to serve on the Italian desk from 1967 to 1969; and then as staff officer for the Executive Secretariat at the Department of State from 1969 to 1970. Taylor was then named staff assistant in 1970, and special assistant to the Secretary of State in 1971. He was then assigned as principal officer at the consulate in Oporto, Portugal in 1972 to 1975, and deputy chief of mission in Nassau, Bahamas, from 1975 to 1978.

He was also in charge of the staff of the Inspector General from 1979 to 1981, and director of the Office of Press Relations for the Bureau of Public Affairs at the Department of State from 1981 to 1983; and executive director and vice chairman of the U.S. Delegation for the International Telecommunication Union High Frequency World Administrative Radio Conference, from 1983 to 1984. Since 1985 Taylor has been deputy coordinator and principal deputy director for the Bureau of International Communications and Information Policy. In 1986 he was acting as chargé d'affaires in Guinea-Bissau.

Taylor died of cancer in Arlington, Virginia, on March 7, 2010.

== See also ==
- United States Ambassador to Togo

Diplomatic posts
Preceded by David A. Korn	United States Ambassador to Togo; 1988–1990	Succeeded by Harmon Elwood Kirby
