= Patricia McMahon Hawkins =

American diplomat (1949–2021)

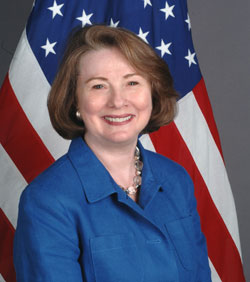
- Hawkins in 2008

19th United States Ambassador to Togo
- In office August 22, 2008 – July 29, 2011
- President: George W. Bush; Barack Obama
- Preceded by: David B. Dunn
- Succeeded by: Robert E. Whitehead

Personal details
- Born: 1949 Pennsylvania, U.S.
- Died: October 6, 2021 (aged 71–72)
- Spouse: Richard S. D. Hawkins
- Profession: Diplomat

Patricia McMahon Hawkins (1949 – October 6, 2021) was a United States career foreign service officer and member of the U.S. State Department. She was the United States ambassador to Togo from 2008 to 2011.

== Life and political career ==
Hawkins was born in Pennsylvania. She attended Barnard College and was a graduate of East Stroudsburg University with a bachelor's degree in education. She has also studied French at Georgetown University, the University of Dijon, and New York University.

Her career started in the United States International Communications Agency in 1980. At USIA headquarters in Washington, D.C., she was the country affairs officer for the eight countries of Francophone West Africa, and Policy Application and Coordination Officer (PACO) in the office of USIA's Assistant Director. She also served as the public affairs advisor to the U.S. Delegation to the CSCE Conference on the Human Dimension, in Paris in 1989. Her first tour was in Paris, where she served as the assistant information officer and deputy press attaché. She subsequently served as information officer in Kinshasa, Zaire, as public affairs officer in Ouagadougou, Burkina Faso, as cultural affairs officer in Bogotá, Colombia, as counselor for public affairs in Abidjan, Cộte d'Ivoire, where she also served briefly as acting DCM and then for several months as chargé d'affaires. In 2001, she was posted to the Dominican Republic, as counselor for public affairs. Her most recent assignments were in Washington, D.C., as policy application and coordination officer in the Office of Public Affairs of the Bureau of African Affairs, and as a career development officer in the Bureau of Human Resources. During a three-year hiatus from the Foreign Service, Hawkins served as the executive assistant to the president and CEO of Otis Elevator Company, in Farmington, Connecticut.

Hawkins succeeded David B. Dunn as the US ambassador to Togo on August 22, 2008. She arrived at post on September 10, 2008, and presented her credentials to the Togolese president on September 12, 2008.

Hawkins died on October 6, 2021, at the age of 72. She was interred at Rock Creek Cemetery.

== Family ==
She was married to Richard S.D. Hawkins, formerly a director of quality improvement for the Otis Elevator Company who quit his job and applied to join the Foreign Service to spend more time with his wife, and has two children, Frédéric and Jessica. Her home in the United States was in Waterville Valley, New Hampshire.

== See also ==
- United States Ambassador to Togo

== Notes and references ==
Diplomatic posts
| Preceded by David B. Dunn | United States Ambassador to Togo; 2008–2011 | Succeeded by Robert E. Whitehead |
