= Johnny Young (diplomat) =

American diplomat (1940–2021)

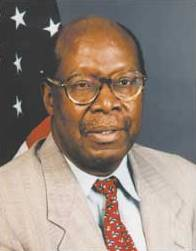
- US State Department photo of Young (2002)

United States Ambassador to Slovenia
- In office October 24, 2001 – September 17, 2004
- President: George W. Bush
- Preceded by: Nancy Halliday Ely-Raphel
- Succeeded by: Thomas Bolling Robertson

United States Ambassador to Bahrain
- In office December 11, 1997 – September 29, 2001
- President: Bill Clinton; George W. Bush
- Preceded by: David M. Ransom
- Succeeded by: Ronald E. Neumann

United States Ambassador to Togo
- In office October 7, 1994 – November 21, 1997
- President: Bill Clinton
- Preceded by: Harmon Elwood Kirby
- Succeeded by: Brenda Schoonover

United States Ambassador to Sierra Leone
- In office November 29, 1989 – July 23, 1992
- President: George H. W. Bush
- Preceded by: Cynthia Shepard Perry
- Succeeded by: Lauralee M. Peters

Personal details
- Born: February 6, 1940 Savannah, Georgia, US
- Died: July 24, 2021 (aged 81) Kensington, Maryland, US
- Spouse: Angelena Clark
- Education: BS, Temple University (1966)
- Awards: Superior Honor Award; Meritorious Honor Award

Johnny Young (February 6, 1940 – July 24, 2021) was an American Foreign Service officer and ambassador who was posted to North and South America, Europe, Africa, and Asia during his 37 years of service.

== Early life ==
Johnny Young was born on February 6, 1940, in Savannah, Georgia. His mother died in January 1941, after which he and a sister were raised by a paternal aunt, Lucille Pressey. At age seven, Young was baptised as a Catholic at Cathedral Basilica of St. John the Baptist in Savannah, Georgia.

The three of them moved to Philadelphia on the charity of a Catholic nun, arriving there on July 4, 1947. Soon thereafter, Young and his sister moved in with other family in Wilmington, Delaware for four years before he returned to Philadelphia and made it his hometown. There he continued to live with family, in poverty.

Young married Angelena Clark around 1967, and by November 22, 1970, the two were expecting their first child.

== Education ==
Young graduated Vare Junior High School in 1954. Despite receiving poor grades on standardized tests, in 1957 he received his high-school diploma from Edward Bach Vocational Technical High School.

In the 1960s, Young traveled to Beirut as a delegate from the Philadelphia YMCA. Inspired by the international trip, he received his Bachelor of Science (magna cum laude) from the Fox School of Business and Management at Temple University in 1966, "[d]etermined to work overseas".

== Career ==
Young's first job was working in retail for Thal Berenholtz, a French Jew who had fled the Holocaust; the older man had such professional and cultural influence on the teenager, that Young later had him present upon the swearing-in of all his ambassadorships.

From 1957 into the 1960s, Young worked as a junior accountant for the government of Philadelphia.

=== Foreign Service ===
Foreign Service assignments (ambassadorships in blue)

Young joined the United States Foreign Service as an officer in 1967. He first worked as a budget and fiscal officer in Antananarivo, Madagascar until 1970. For two years he was the supervisory general services officer in Conakry, Guinea (during Portugal's Operation Green Sea) before doing the same in Nairobi, Kenya from 1972–1974. From Kenya, Young transferred to Doha, Qatar, where he first served as chargé d'affaires. After another overseas assignment to Bridgetown, Barbados, Young returned to the US in 1979 to work in the Foreign Service's Washington, D.C. Bureau of Personnel and Office of the Inspector General. In 1983, Young left the States to serve in Amman, Jordan for two years before moving on to The Hague, Netherlands.

From 1989 to 2004, Young was an ambassador extraordinary and plenipotentiary. Assigned to Sierra Leone from November 29, 1989 – July 23, 1992, Young succeeded Cynthia Shepard Perry and was himself succeeded by Lauralee M. Peters. Young presented his credentials as Ambassador to Togo on October 7, 1994, taking the office recently left by Harmon Elwood Kirby; when Young left on November 21, 1997, he would be replaced by Brenda Schoonover. As Ambassador to Bahrain (December 11, 1997 to September 29, 2001), Young was filling the shoes of David M. Ransom; when Young left, Ronald E. Neumann filled his role the following month. Young's final ambassadorial assignment was to Slovenia from October 24, 2001 – September 17, 2004; Young took the office after it was vacated by Nancy Halliday Ely-Raphel, and Thomas Bolling Robertson took it from Young after the latter retired.

While working for the Foreign Service, Young participated in Operation Sharp Edge and the evacuation of US civilians in Freetown after Valentine Strasser's coup d'état. He also received performance-based cash awards, a Superior Honor Award, a Meritorious Honor Award, and two Group Honor Awards. On October 12, 2004, Young was appointed a Senior Foreign Service Career Ambassador, one of the few African Americans of his generation to be honored with such.

== Post-retirement ==
After his retirement from government service, Young worked as a consultant, a lecturer, and the executive director of the United States Conference of Catholic Bishops' Migration and Refugee Services Division from 2007 through at least 2013. In 2013, Young also self-published the autobiographical From The Projects to the Palace: A Diplomat's Unlikely Journey from the Bottom to the Top; printed by Xlibris, it tells Young's story from childhood through his diplomatic career.

After his 2004 retirement, Young was a member of St. Augustine Catholic Church in Washington, D.C. Diagnosed with pancreatic cancer in December 2020, he died at home in Kensington, Maryland on July 24, 2021, survived by his wife and two children.
