= Age of Ambition =

2014 non-fiction book by Evan Osnos

Age of Ambition: Chasing Fortune, Truth, and Faith in the New China
- Cover of the 2014 edition, published by Farrar, Straus and Giroux
- Author: Evan Osnos
- Subject: China
- Genre: Non-fiction
- Published: 2014 (Farrar, Straus and Giroux)
- Pages: 403
- Awards: National Book Award
- ISBN: 978-0-374-28074-1
- Dewey Decimal: 951.06

Age of Ambition: Chasing Fortune, Truth, and Faith in the New China is a non-fiction book by Evan Osnos, a staff writer at The New Yorker. Age of Ambition chronicles the lives of people that Osnos came to know while he was in China from 2005 to 2013.

Age of Ambition was originally published by Farrar, Straus and Giroux in 2014. The book was awarded the National Book Award for Nonfiction in 2014 and was a finalist for the 2015 Pulitzer Prize for General Nonfiction.

== Summary ==
Based partly on Osnos' reports in The New Yorker, the book describes his travels in China, where he interviewed people swept up by economic, political, and social change. Osnos chronicles their journeys and reflects on the political implications. The title refers to an emerging sense of individual aspiration, "a belief in the sheer possibility to remake a life," Osnos writes. "Some who tried succeeded; many others did not." Some of the featured subjects are prominent, including artist Ai Weiwei and economist Justin Yifu Lin; others are not prominent citizens, including a teacher, a street sweeper, and an auctioneer imprisoned for bribing judges.

== Reception ==
In The New York Times Book Review, Jonathan Mirsky described it as "eloquent and comprehensive." In the San Francisco Chronicle, Minxin Pei called it "by far the most thoughtful and well-crafted work on China written by an American journalist in recent years.” The Economist questioned the emphasis on Ai Weiwei and dissident lawyer Chen Guangcheng "whose well-documented lives and causes take up a little too much of the narrative."
