= Brenda Schoonover =

American diplomat

15th United States Ambassador to Togo
- In office January 7, 1998 – July 30, 2000
- President: Bill Clinton
- Preceded by: Johnny Young
- Succeeded by: Karl William Hofmann

Personal details
- Born: 1939 (age 86–87)
- Spouse: Richard C. Schoonover
- Profession: Diplomat

Brenda Brown Schoonover (born 1939) was the United States Ambassador to Togo, from January 1998 to July 2000.

Schoonover was born in Baltimore, Maryland. She has a Bachelor of Arts degree from Morgan State University in Baltimore, and did graduate studies at Howard University, Washington, D.C. She is fluent in French; and is married to Richard C. Schoonover, a former Foreign Service officer retired from the former United States Information Agency (now known as the Public Diplomacy and Public Affairs section of the State Department).

She began her overseas service as a Peace Corps Volunteer in 1961 in the Philippines with the first groups to go abroad. She later served in the Peace Corps' Office of Talent Search, then as associate director of the Peace Corps in Tanzania, followed by an appointment as director of the agency's School Partnership Program. In the 1970s, Schoonover worked for two years as Arlington County of Virginia's affirmative action officer.

Schoonover has been with the Department of State for 21 years in a variety of administrative positions in the Philippines; Sri Lanka; Tunisia; and in the Bureau of Near East and South Asian Affairs. From 1988 to 1991, she was the chief of personnel for the Bureau of European and Canadian Affairs. From 1992 to 1996 she was administrative officer and deputy director for the Office of Joint Administrative Services, U.S. Embassy, Brussels, Belgium. She completed the Senior seminar for foreign affairs required by the U.S. State Department.

Since her arrival in Togo in January 1998, the Ambassador has spoken at several conferences on the Government of Togo's hospital and school supplies donated by the U.S. Department of Defense. The Ambassador has also welcomed several groups of Peace Corps Volunteers to Togo and in April 1998, participated in the Peace Corps All-Volunteer Conference in Pagala, Togo. Her term ended in July 2000 and was given presented credentials on January 7, 1998. Ambassador Schoonover was a Diplomat in Residence at the University of North Carolina in Chapel Hill from 2000 to 2001. She retired in 2004.

Diplomatic posts
Preceded by Johnny Young	United States Ambassador to Togo; 1997–2000	Succeeded by Karl William Hofmann
