= Francis Stephen Ruddy =

Francis Stephen Ruddy (born September 15, 1937, Jackson Heights, Queens, died May 7, 2014 Washington, DC) was the US ambassador to Equatorial Guinea (1984-1988), a university professor, writer, General Counsel for the Department of Energy, and editor.

== Personal life ==
Ruddy attended Xavier High School, Holy Cross College (A.B., 1959), served in the USMC, and received his Ph.D. in International Law from Cambridge University (1969). He also received a LL.B. in 1965 from Loyola University and a LL.M. in 1967 from New York University.

== Career ==
Ruddy was Of Counsel to ExxonMobil since 1978; Deputy General Counsel and Congressional Liaison for the United States Information Agency (USIA) from 1973 until 1974. In 1981, Ronald Reagan announced he would nominate Ruddy to be Assistant Administrator of the Agency for International Development, African Branch, United States International Development Cooperation Agency.
