= Jeff Grant (attorney) =

American lawyer and minister

Jeffrey Grant
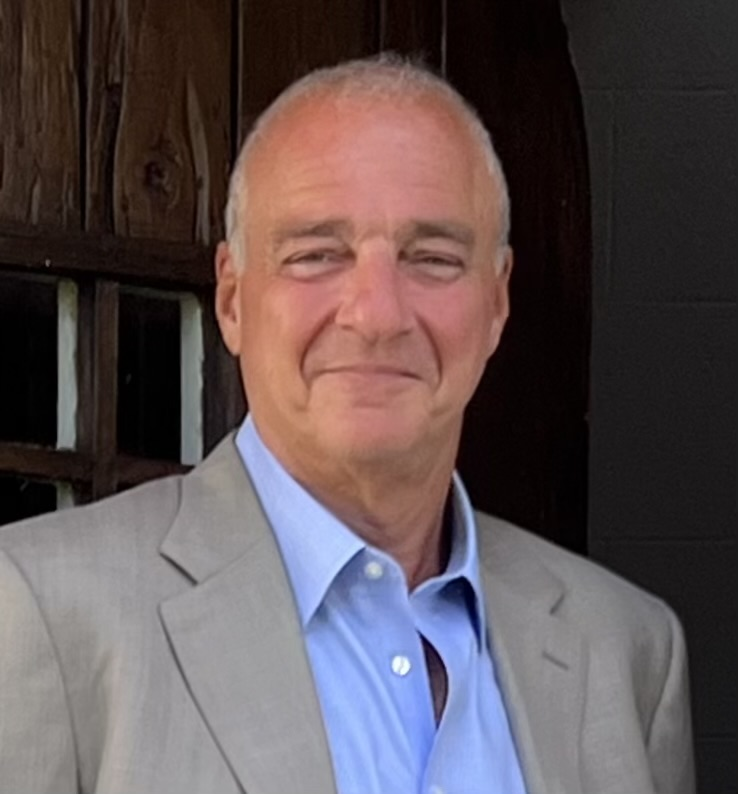
- Occupation: Lawyer
- Years active: 1981 – present
- Website: https://grantlaw.com/

Jeffrey D. Grant is an American lawyer, minister, and non-profit Executive Director who served 18 months in federal prison for loan fraud.

He co-founded the White Collar Support Group, a group for white-collar criminals and their families. The group also hosts conferences on white-collar reentry and federal expungement.

== Early life ==
Grant graduated from SUNY Brockport with a B.S. in Business and Economics in 1978, and graduated with his J.D. from New York Law School in 1981.

== Career and conviction ==
Grant practiced law in New York City and then Westchester County, NY, operating a 20-person law firm and serving as general counsel for major real estate firms.

In 2001, Grant made false statements on a Small Business Administration EIDL loan application and was later convicted for loan fraud. Grant was sentenced to 18 months in federal prison. Grant was incarcerated at United States Penitentiary, Allenwood.

== Post-incarceration ==
After serving time in federal prison from 2006 to 2007, Grant earned a Master of Divinity from Union Theological Seminary in New York City. After graduating in 2012, Grant served at the First Baptist Church of Bridgeport in Bridgeport, CT as Associate Minister and Director of Prison Ministries.

In 2015, Grant and his wife Lynn Springer co-founded a 501(c)(3) organization devoted to white-collar criminals navigating the justice system and their families. The non-profit hosts a weekly meeting and holds the annual White Collar Conference, first held online in 2024.

On May 5, 2021, Grant's law license was reinstated. Grant is an active member of several bar associations and has served on various criminal justice-related boards. From 2016 – 2019, Grant served as executive director of Family ReEntry, Inc., a criminal justice organization.

=== White Collar Support Group ===
The White Collar Support Group was co-founded in 2016 by Grant and Lynn Springer as part of their nonprofit organization, which was incorporated as a 501(c)(3) non-profit in 2015. The White Collar Support Group is a community outreach program based in the United States that offers community support and resources for those navigating the white-collar criminal justice system. The group advocates for expungement reform and for access to banking for people with felony convictions. The group is a participant in Yale School of Management Professor Dr. Erin Frey's Professional and Personal Restoration Study.

In 2024, the White Collar Support Group hosted the first annual White Collar Conference, an online event. Speakers included GOOD PLANeT CEO David Israel, podcaster Brent Cassity, Bridgegate defendant Bill Baroni, criminal defense lawyer Elizabeth Kelley, Theranos whistleblower Erika Cheung, former district attorney Seth Williams, tech entrepreneur Drew Chapin, and others. Membership includes lawyers, executives, and other professionals who are charged or convicted of white-collar crime. Members include Richard Bronson, former partner at Stratton Oakmont, the firm featured in Martin Scorsese’s film The Wolf of Wall Street; and Gordon Caplan of the Varsity Blues scandal.

== Publications ==
Grant has appeared in various media such as The New Yorker, Entrepreneur, Bloomberg Law, Forbes, Vanity Fair, and New York Magazine, among others.

Grant contributed to the book Suicide and Its Impact on the Criminal Justice System (2021), published by the American Bar Association. He was featured in the books Wildland: The Making of America’s Fury by Evan Osnos and Trusted White Collar Offenders: Global Case Studies of Crime Convenience, published by academic publisher Springer International.
