= Geoff Grant (footballer) =

Australian rules footballer

Personal information
- Full name: Geoff Grant
- Born: 2 December 1914
- Died: 8 May 1973 (aged 58)
- Original team: South Richmond
- Height: 168 cm (5 ft 6 in)
- Weight: 66 kg (146 lb)

Playing career^{1}
Years	Club	Games (Goals)
1936–38	Richmond	21 (3)
- ^{1} Playing statistics correct to the end of 1938.

Geoff Grant (2 December 1914 – 8 May 1973) was a former Australian rules footballer who played with Richmond in the Victorian Football League (VFL).
