= Times Books =

Publishing imprint

- Parent company: Henry Holt (Macmillan)
- Founded: 1959; 2000 (relaunch)
- Founder: Melvin J. Brisk
- Country of origin: United States
- Headquarters location: New York City, New York, U.S.
- Imprints: Quadrangle Books

Times Books (previously The New York Times Book Company) is a publishing imprint owned by The New York Times Company and licensed to Henry Holt and Company.

The imprint began as The New York Times Book Company in 1969, when its parent company purchased Quadrangle Books, a small publishing house in Chicago, founded in 1959 by Michael Braude. Its president was Melvin J. Brisk. Initially run entirely by The New York Times Company, the name of the publishing arm was changed to Times Books in 1977.

In 1984, the Times Company licensed the imprint to Random House. From 1991 through 1996, during the Random House tenure, the head of Times Books was Peter Osnos, who later founded PublicAffairs Books.

Times Books was re-licensed in 2000 as an imprint of Henry Holt, which is itself an imprint of Holtzbrinck Publishers/Macmillan, the U.S. arm of the Georg von Holtzbrinck Publishing Group.

Editorial directors for Times Books have included David Sobel and Paul Golob.

Times Books has had a somewhat controversial right of first refusal policy with respect to manuscripts by employees of The New York Times Company.

Times Books is headquartered at 120 Broadway in Manhattan, New York City.
