= David A. Korn =

American diplomat (1930–2022)

11th United States Ambassador to Togo
- In office October 16, 1986 – April 4, 1988
- President: Ronald Reagan
- Preceded by: Owen W. Roberts
- Succeeded by: Rush Walker Taylor Jr.

Personal details
- Born: September 1, 1930 Wichita Falls, Texas, United States
- Died: September 7, 2022 (aged 92)
- Profession: Diplomat

Military service
- Branch/service: United States Army
- Years of service: 1951–53

David Adolph Korn (September 1, 1930 – September 7, 2022) was an American diplomat, former United States Ambassador to Togo, author, and foreign service officer. He was appointed to his ambassadorship position on October 16, 1986, and left that post on April 4, 1988.

David Korn was born in Wichita Falls, Texas. He attended Joplin Junior College and the University of Missouri. He holds degrees from the Institut d'Etudes Politiques in Paris, France, 1953–1956, and the Johns Hopkins School of Advanced International Studies, 1957. Korn was fluent in French, Hebrew, and Arabic. He served in the United States Army from 1951 to 1953.

Korn joined the Foreign Service in September 1957 after serving briefly as a desk officer for North Africa at the International Administration, the predecessor of USAID. Later that year he was assigned as political officer to the U.S. Embassy in Paris, France. He returned to Washington D.C. in 1959 to serve in the State Department's Executive Secretariat. From 1961 to 1963, Korn was political officer at the U.S. Embassy in Beirut, Lebanon. From there, in 1963 to 1964, he took Arabic language training at the American consulate in Tangier, Morocco; and from 1964 to 1965, he served as Chargé d'Affaires and political officer at the U.S. Embassy in Nouakchott, Mauritania. He then returned as desk officer for Arabian peninsula affairs from 1965 to 1967.

Korn was then assigned to the U.S. Embassy in Tel Aviv, Israel, in 1967, where he took Hebrew language training before serving as political officer from 1968 to 1969 and chief of the political section from January 1970 to August 1971. Then from 1971 to 1972, he took mid-career training at Princeton University and then returned to the Department as Office Director for northern Arab affairs from 1972 to 1975. Korn was appointed American consul general in Calcutta, India, from 1975 to 1977. He served as a member of the policy planning staff in 1978; became officer director for Arab-Israeli affairs from 1978 to 1981; and was assigned to the Bureau of African Affairs, from 1981 to 1982. From 1982 to 1985, Korn was Chargé d'Affaires and ad interim at the U.S. Embassy in Addis Ababa, Ethiopia, and in 1985–1986 was a fellow at Chatham House in London, England.

His father was Thomas Adolph Korn and his mother was Iris Dobson. David Korn was divorced from Susan K. Palmer in 1981 and was married to Roberta Cohen, currently a non-resident senior fellow at the Brookings Institution. Korn died on September 7, 2022.

== Published works ==
Since 1986 to 1990, David Korn has published 6 books mainly published by Routledge, Southern Illinois University Press, Indiana University Press, Westview Press, Brookings Institution Press, Yale University Press, Human Rights Watch, Institute for the Study of Diplomacy, Georgetown University School of Foreign Service, and the Defense Academic Research Support Program and The Middle East Institute.

- Korn, David A. (1986). "Syria and Lebanon: A Fateful Entanglement". The World Today. 42 (8/9): 137–142. JSTOR 40395846.
- Korn, David A. (1986). Ethiopia, the United States, and the Soviet Union. Southern Illinois University Press. ISBN 978-0-8093-1338-9.
- Korn, David A; Dorr, Steven R; Slater, Neysa M (1990). The Horn of Africa and Arabia : conference papers. Defense Academic Research Support Program and the Middle East Institute. OCLC 23824575.
- Korn, David A. (1990). Human rights in Iraq. New Haven: Yale University Press. ISBN 978-0-300-04959-6. OCLC 22113666.
- Korn, David A. (1992). The making of United Nations Security Council Resolution 242. Institute for the Study of Diplomacy, Georgetown University School of Foreign Service. OCLC 26515315.
- Korn, David A. (1992). Stalemate: The War of Attrition and Great Power Diplomacy in the Middle East, 1967–1970. Westview Press. ISBN 978-0-8133-8237-1.
- Korn, David A. (1993). Assassination in Khartoum. Indiana University Press. ISBN 0-253-33202-8.
- Korn, David A. (1999). Exodus Within Borders: An Introduction to the Crisis of Internal Displacement. Brookings Institution Press. ISBN 978-0-8157-4954-7.
- Weiss, Thomas George; Korn, David A. (2006). Internal displacement: conceptualization and its consequences. Routledge. ISBN 978-0-415-77080-4.

== See also ==
- United States Ambassador to Togo

Diplomatic posts
Preceded by Owen W. Roberts	United States Ambassador to Togo; 1986–1988	Succeeded by Rush Walker Taylor Jr.
