= Mark L. Asquino =

American Ambassador

Mark L. Asquino (born 1949) is a retired (November 2015) American Ambassador who was Ambassador to Equatorial Guinea from 2012 until 2015.

== Biography ==
Asquino earned both an undergraduate degree and Ph.D. in American Civilization from Brown University.

== Career ==
When he left Equatorial Guinea, the government “awarded him the country’s highest decoration, “The Grand Cross of the Order of Independence.” He came out of retirement from June to August 2016 at the request of the State Department to be the Acting Chief of Mission at the U.S. Embassy in Port Louis, Mauritius. In January 2023, he published a memoir entitled "Spanish Connections: My Diplomatic Journey from Venezuela to Equatorial Guinea."

He was a Senior Public Diplomacy Fellow at George Washington University for the 2010/11 academic year.
