= Ray H. Schoonover =

American businessman and politician

Ray H. Schoonover (June 9, 1896 – November 4, 1966) was an American businessman and politician.

Born in Saint Paul, Minnesota, Schoonover served in the United States Army during World War I. Schoonover was in the automobile, real estate, and insurance businesses in Monroe, Wisconsin. Schoonover served as under-sheriff and the sheriff of Green County, Wisconsin from 1940 to 1944 and was a Republican. He also served on the Green County Board of Supervisors and was the assistant coroner. In 1946, Schoonover served in the Wisconsin State Assembly. From 1953 to 1961, Schoonover served as United States marshal for the United States District Court for the Western District of Wisconsin. Schoonover died in Madison, Wisconsin as a result of a stroke.
