= List of ambassadors appointed in the second Trump presidency =

U.S. ambassadors appointed by the 47th president

This is a list of United States ambassadors appointed by the 47th president of the United States, Donald Trump, during his second term in office.

== Color key ==
- Announced appointees not yet sent to the Senate.
- Denotes nomination pending before a Senate committee.
- Denotes nomination reported favorably by a Senate committee, pending confirmation by the full Senate
- Confirmed appointees who are political appointees (rather than career foreign service officers)
- Confirmed appointees who are Career Members of the Senior Executive Service or Senior Foreign Service.

CD, or career diplomats, denotes ambassadors who were appointed from the U.S. Foreign Service.

PA, or political appointees, denotes ambassadors who were not appointed from the Foreign Service.

== Nominees for ambassadors to foreign states ==
Office	Ambassador	Assumed office	Left office
Ambassador to Albania	Eric Wendt	September 26, 2026 (Confirmed* August 7, 2026, 51–47); *En bloc confirmation of 74 nominees.	
Ambassador to Argentina	Peter Lamelas	November 4, 2025 (Confirmed* September 18, 2025, 51–47); *En bloc confirmation of 48 nominees.	
Ambassador to Azerbaijan	Alexander Alden	Awaiting Senate Confirmation	
Ambassador to Australia	Dave Brat	September 29, 2026 (Confirmed* August 7, 2026, 51–47); *En bloc confirmation of 74 nominees.	
Ambassador to Austria	Arthur Fisher	November 19, 2025 (Confirmed* October 7, 2025, 51–47); *En bloc confirmation of 107 nominees.	
Ambassador to Bangladesh	Brent T. Christensen	January 15, 2026 (Confirmed* December 18, 2025, 53–43); *En bloc confirmation of 97 nominees.	
Ambassador to Bahrain	Stephanie Hallett	January 21, 2026 (Confirmed* October 7, 2025, 51–47); *En bloc confirmation of 107 nominees.	
Ambassador to the Bahamas	Herschel Walker	December 9, 2025 (Confirmed* October 7, 2025, 51–47); *En bloc confirmation of 107 nominees.	
Ambassador to Barbados; Ambassador to Antigua and Barbuda; Ambassador to Dominica; Ambassador to Grenada; Ambassador to Saint Kitts and Nevis; Ambassador to Saint Lucia; Ambassador to Saint Vincent and the Grenadines	Kimberly Payne Greenwood	Awaiting Senate Confirmation	
Ambassador to Belgium	Bill White	November 13, 2025 (Confirmed* October 7, 2025, 51–47); *En bloc confirmation of 107 nominees.	
Ambassador to Belize	André Bauer	September 7, 2026 (Confirmed* August 7, 2026, 51–47); *En bloc confirmation of 74 nominees.	
Ambassador to Benin	Peter Lord	TBD (Confirmed September 30, 2026, Voice Vote)	
Ambassador to Bosnia & Herzegovina	Ronald Johnson	Awaiting Senate Confirmation	
Ambassador to Brazil	Daniel Perez	TBD (Confirmed* August 7, 2026, 51–47); *En bloc confirmation of 74 nominees.	
Ambassador to Bulgaria	Douglas Holder	Awaiting Senate Confirmation	
Ambassador to Cambodia	Christopher J. Anderson	November 10, 2026 (Confirmed* August 7, 2026, 51–47); *En bloc confirmation of 74 nominees.	
Ambassador to Cameroon	Christian Ehrhardt	Awaiting Senate Confirmation	
Ambassador to Canada	Pete Hoekstra	April 29, 2025 (Confirmed April 9, 2025, 60–37)	
Ambassador to Cape Verde	Nutan Patel	TBD (Confirmed September 30, 2026, Voice Vote)	
Ambassador to Chad	William Flens	Awaiting Senate Confirmation	
Ambassador to Chile	Brandon Judd	November 10, 2025 (Confirmed* October 7, 2025, 51–47); *En bloc confirmation of 107 nominees.	
Ambassador to China	David Perdue	May 16, 2025 (Confirmed April 29, 2025, 67–29)	
Ambassador to Colombia	Nate Morris	Awaiting Senate Confirmation	
Ambassador to Costa Rica	Melinda Hildebrand	January 8, 2026 (Confirmed* October 7, 2025, 51–47); *En bloc confirmation of 107 nominees.	
Ambassador to Croatia	Nicole McGraw	October 21, 2025 (Confirmed* October 7, 2025, 51–47); *En bloc confirmation of 107 nominees.	
Ambassador to the Czech Republic	Nicholas Merrick	October 23, 2025 (Confirmed* October 7, 2025, 51–47); *En bloc confirmation of 107 nominees.	
Ambassador to Cyprus	John Breslow	September 9, 2026 (Confirmed* August 7, 2026, 51–47); *En bloc confirmation of 74 nominees.	
Ambassador to Denmark	Ken Howery	November 5, 2025 (Confirmed* October 7, 2025, 51–47); *En bloc confirmation of 107 nominees.	
Ambassador to Djibouti	Junaid Munir	Awaiting Senate Confirmation	
Ambassador to the Dominican Republic	Leah Campos	November 19, 2025 (Confirmed* October 7, 2025, 51–47); *En bloc confirmation of 107 nominees.	
Ambassador to Ecuador	Pete Snyder	Awaiting Senate Confirmation	
Ambassador to Egypt	Nick Oberheiden	Awaiting Senate Confirmation	
Ambassador to El Salvador	Mark Abreu	Awaiting Senate Confirmation	
Ambassador to Estonia	Roman Pipko	November 26, 2025 (Confirmed* October 7, 2025, 51–47); *En bloc confirmation of 107 nominees.	
Ambassador to Equatorial Guinea	Stanley L. Brown	TBD (Confirmed* August 7, 2026, 51–47); *En bloc confirmation of 74 nominees.	
Ambassador to Finland	Howard Brodie	November 13, 2025 (Confirmed* October 7, 2025, 51–47); *En bloc confirmation of 107 nominees.	
Ambassador to France; Ambassador to Monaco	Charles Kushner	July 11, 2025 (Confirmed May 19, 2025, 51–45)	
Ambassador to Gabon	Keith Heffern	TBD (Confirmed September 30, 2026, Voice Vote)	
Ambassador to the Gambia	Laurence Socha	October 14, 2026 (Confirmed* August 7, 2026, 51–47); *En bloc confirmation of 74 nominees.	
Ambassador to Greece	Kimberly Guilfoyle	November 4, 2025 (Confirmed* September 18, 2025, 51–47); *En bloc confirmation of 48 nominees.	October 13, 2026
Ambassador to Haiti	Austin Holmes	Awaiting Senate Confirmation	
Ambassador to the Holy See	Brian Burch	September 13, 2025 (Confirmed August 2, 2025, 49–44)	
Ambassador to Hungary	Benjamin Landa	Awaiting Senate Confirmation	
Ambassador to Iceland	Billy Long	August 10, 2026 (Confirmed* May 18, 2026, 46–43); *En bloc confirmation of 49 nominees.	
Ambassador to India	Sergio Gor	January 14, 2026 (Confirmed* October 7, 2025, 51–47); *En bloc confirmation of 107 nominees.	
Ambassador to Indonesia	William E. Grayson	Awaiting Senate Confirmation	
Ambassador to Ireland	Edward Walsh	July 1, 2025 (Confirmed June 4, 2025, 57–38)	
Ambassador to Israel	Mike Huckabee	April 21, 2025 (Confirmed April 9, 2025, 53–46)	
Ambassador to Italy; Ambassador to San Marino	Tilman Fertitta	May 6, 2025 (Confirmed April 29, 2025, 83–14)	
Ambassador to Jamaica	Kari Lake	Awaiting Senate Confirmation	
Ambassador to Japan	George Edward Glass	April 18, 2025 (Confirmed April 8, 2025, 66–32)	
Ambassador to Jordan	James Holtsnider	December 7, 2025 (Confirmed* October 7, 2025, 51–47); *En bloc confirmation of 107 nominees.	
Ambassador to Kazakhstan	Julie Stufft	January 9, 2026 (Confirmed* October 7, 2025, 51–47); *En bloc confirmation of 107 nominees.	
Ambassador to Kenya	Henry T. Wooster	TBD (Confirmed September 30, 2026, Voice Vote)	
Ambassador to Kyrgyzstan	Steven Gillen	TBD (Confirmed September 30, 2026, Voice Vote)	
Ambassador to Latvia	Melissa Argyros	February 20, 2026 (Confirmed* December 18, 2025, 53–43); *En bloc confirmation of 97 nominees.	
Ambassador to Lebanon	Michel Issa	November 17, 2025 (Confirmed* October 7, 2025, 51–47); *En bloc confirmation of 107 nominees.	
Ambassador to Lithuania	Keith Noreika	Awaiting Senate Confirmation	
Ambassador to Luxembourg	Stacey Feinberg	November 13, 2025 (Confirmed* October 7, 2025, 51–47); *En bloc confirmation of 107 nominees.	
Ambassador to Madagascar; Ambassador to Comoros	Marc Dillard	Awaiting Senate Confirmation	
Ambassador to Malawi	John McIntyre	TBD (Confirmed September 30, 2026, Voice Vote)	
Ambassador to Malaysia	Joshua Harris	TBD (Confirmed September 30, 2026, Voice Vote)	
Ambassador to Malta	Somers Farkas	November 26, 2025 (Confirmed* October 7, 2025, 51–47); *En bloc confirmation of 107 nominees.	
Ambassador to Mauritania	Jessica Long	Awaiting Senate Confirmation	
Ambassador to Mexico	Ronald D. Johnson	May 19, 2025 (Confirmed April 9, 2025, 49–46)	
Ambassador to Moldova	Mark Burkhalter	September 30, 2026 (Confirmed* August 7, 2026, 51–47); *En bloc confirmation of 74 nominees.	
Ambassador to Montenegro	Peter M. McCoy Jr.	Awaiting Senate Confirmation	
Ambassador to Morocco	Duke Buchan	December 2, 2025 (Confirmed* October 7, 2025, 51–47); *En bloc confirmation of 107 nominees.	
Ambassador to Namibia	John Giordano	October 29, 2025 (Confirmed* October 7, 2025, 51–47); *En bloc confirmation of 107 nominees.	
Ambassador to the Netherlands	Joe Popolo	October 29, 2025 (Confirmed* October 7, 2025, 51–47); *En bloc confirmation of 107 nominees.	
Ambassador to New Zealand; Ambassador to Samoa	Jared Novelly	July 1, 2026 (Confirmed* May 18, 2026, 46–43); *En bloc confirmation of 49 nominees.	
Ambassador to Nicaragua	Natasha Franceschi	TBD (Confirmed September 30, 2026, Voice Vote)	
Ambassador to Norway	Michael E. Kavoukjian	November 5, 2026 (Confirmed* August 7, 2026, 51–47); *En bloc confirmation of 74 nominees.	
Ambassador to Panama	Kevin Marino Cabrera	May 5, 2025 (Confirmed April 9, 2025, 51–45)	
Ambassador to Paraguay	Paul Kalmbach	Awaiting Senate Confirmation	
Ambassador to Peru	Bernardo Navarro	February 3, 2026 (Confirmed* December 18, 2025, 53–43); *En bloc confirmation of 97 nominees.	
Ambassador to the Philippines	Lee Lipton	June 30, 2026 (Confirmed* May 18, 2026, 46–43); *En bloc confirmation of 49 nominees.	
Ambassador to Poland	Thomas Rose	November 6, 2025 (Confirmed* October 7, 2025, 51–47); *En bloc confirmation of 107 nominees.	
Ambassador to Portugal	John Arrigo	September 30, 2025 (Confirmed August 2, 2025, 52-42	
Ambassador to Romania	Darryl Nirenberg	March 3, 2026 (Confirmed* December 18, 2025, 53–43); *En bloc confirmation of 97 nominees.	
Ambassador to Rwanda	Nicholas Checker	Awaiting Senate Confirmation	
Ambassador to Saudi Arabia	Wesley Hunt	Awaiting Senate Confirmation	
Ambassador to Serbia	Michael Young	Awaiting Senate Confirmation	
Ambassador to Sierra Leone	Daniel Travis	TBD (Confirmed September 30, 2026, Voice Vote)	
Ambassador to Singapore	Anjani Sinha	November 17, 2025 (Confirmed* October 7, 2025, 51–47); *En bloc confirmation of 107 nominees.	
Ambassador to Slovakia	Doug Mastriano	Awaiting Senate Confirmation	
Ambassador to Slovenia	Asel Roberts	June 15, 2026 (Confirmed* May 18, 2026, 46–43); *En bloc confirmation of 49 nominees.	
Ambassador to Somalia	Devin Kennington	Awaiting Senate Confirmation	
Ambassador to South Africa	L. Brent Bozell III	February 23, 2026 (Confirmed* December 18, 2025, 53–43); *En bloc confirmation of 97 nominees.	
Ambassador to South Korea	Michelle Steel	August 12, 2026 (Confirmed June 17, 2025, 55–39)	
Ambassador to Kuwait	Dino LaVerghetta	Awaiting Senate Confirmation	
Ambassador to Spain; Ambassador to Andorra	Benjamin Leon	February 18, 2026 (Confirmed* December 18, 2025, 53–43); *En bloc confirmation of 97 nominees.	
Ambassador to Sri Lanka	Eric Meyer	August 25, 2026 (Confirmed* May 18, 2026, 46–43); *En bloc confirmation of 49 nominees.	
Ambassador to Suriname	Paul Watzlavick	Awaiting Senate Confirmation	
Ambassador to Sweden	Christine Toretti	October 21, 2025 (Confirmed* September 18, 2025, 51–47); *En bloc confirmation of 48 nominees.	
Ambassador to Switzerland; Ambassador to Liechtenstein	Callista Gingrich	October 23, 2025 (Confirmed* September 18, 2025, 51–47); *En bloc confirmation of 48 nominees.	
Ambassador to Tanzania	William Trachman	October 15, 2026 (Confirmed* August 7, 2026, 51–47); *En bloc confirmation of 74 nominees.	
Ambassador to Thailand	Sean O'Neill	February 11, 2026 (Confirmed* October 7, 2025, 51–47); *En bloc confirmation of 107 nominees.	
Ambassador to Togo	Charles Goodman III	TBD (Confirmed September 30, 2026, Voice Vote)	
Ambassador to Tonga	Justin Bytheway	Awaiting Senate Confirmation	
Ambassador to Trinidad & Tobago	Jennifer Carroll	Awaiting Senate Confirmation	
Ambassador to Tunisia	Bill Bazzi	November 21, 2025 (Confirmed* October 7, 2025, 51–47); *En bloc confirmation of 107 nominees.	
Ambassador to Turkey	Tom Barrack	May 14, 2025 (Confirmed April 29, 2025, 60–36)	
Ambassador to Turkmenistan	William Makaneole	Awaiting Senate Confirmation	
Ambassador to the United Kingdom	Warren Stephens	May 21, 2025 (Confirmed April 29, 2025, 59–39)	
Ambassador to Uruguay	Lou Rinaldi	September 30, 2025 (Confirmed August 1, 2025, 51–45)	
Ambassador to Vietnam	Jennifer Wicks McNamara	July 6, 2026 (Confirmed* May 18, 2026, 46–43); *En bloc confirmation of 49 nominees.	

== Nominees for ambassadors to international organizations ==
=== United States Mission to the United Nations ===
Office	Ambassador	Background	Assumed office	Left office
Representative to the United Nations and Representative in the Security Council of the United Nations (with the rank of ambassador)	Mike Waltz	PA	September 21, 2025 (Confirmed September 19, 2025, 47–43)	
Representative to the Sessions of the General Assembly of the United Nations (with the rank of ambassador)	Mike Waltz	PA	September 29, 2025 (Confirmed September 29, 2025, 54–45)	
Deputy Representative to the United Nations and Deputy Representative in the Security Council of the United Nations and Representative to the Sessions of the General Assembly of the United Nations (with the rank of ambassador)	Tammy Bruce	PA	December 29, 2025 (Confirmed* December 18, 2025, 53–43); *En bloc confirmation of 97 nominees.	
Representative to the United Nations Agencies for Food and Agriculture (with the rank of ambassador)	Lynda Blanchard	PA	November 10, 2025 (Confirmed* October 7, 2025, 51–47); *En bloc confirmation of 107 nominees.	
Representative to the United Nations for U.N. Management and Reform (with the rank of ambassador)	Jeff Bartos	PA	November 3, 2025 (Confirmed* September 18, 2025, 51–44); *En bloc confirmation of 48 nominees.	
Representative to the Economic and Social Council of the United Nations (with the rank of ambassador)	Dan Negrea	PA	October 10, 2025 (Confirmed* October 7, 2025, 51–47); *En bloc confirmation of 107 nominees.	
Alternate Representative for Special Political Affairs in the United Nations (with the rank of ambassador)	Jennifer Locetta	PA	September 22, 2025 (Confirmed* September 18, 2025, 51–44); *En bloc confirmation of 48 nominees.	
Representative to the United Nations and Other International Organizations in Geneva (with the rank of ambassador)	Todd Steggerda	PA	September 28, 2026 (Confirmed* August 7, 2026, 51–47); *En bloc confirmation of 74 nominees.	
Representative to the United Nations International Organizations in Vienna (with the rank of ambassador)	Preston Wells Griffith III	PA	September 3, 2026 (Confirmed* August 7, 2026, 51–47); *En bloc confirmation of 74 nominees.	

=== Other international organizations ===
Office	Ambassador	Background	Assumed office	Left office
Permanent Representative on the Council of the North Atlantic Treaty Organization (with the rank of ambassador)	Matthew Whitaker	PA	April 3, 2025 (Confirmed April 1, 2025, 52–45)	
Representative to the European Union (with the rank of ambassador)	Andrew Puzder	PA	September 11, 2025 (Confirmed August 2, 2025, 53–44)	
Permanent Representative to the Organization of American States (with the rank of ambassador)	Leandro Rizzuto Jr.	PA	October 28, 2025 (Confirmed* October 7, 2025, 51–47); *En bloc confirmation of 107 nominees.	
Representative to the Association of Southeast Asian Nations (with the rank of ambassador)	Yeouk Kevin Kim	PA	June 11, 2026 (Confirmed* May 18, 2026, 46–43); *En bloc confirmation of 49 nominees.	
Representative to the International Atomic Energy Agency (with the rank of ambassador)	Preston Wells Griffith III	PA	September 5, 2026 (Confirmed* August 7, 2026, 51–47); *En bloc confirmation of 74 nominees.	
Representative to the Organization for Security and Cooperation in Europe (with the rank of ambassador)	Darrell Owens	PA	July 3, 2026 (Confirmed June 23, 2026, 67–30)	
Representative to the Organization for Economic Cooperation and Development (with the rank of ambassador)	John Hurley	PA	September 4, 2026 (Confirmed* August 7, 2026, 51–47); *En bloc confirmation of 74 nominees.	
Representative to the Organization for the Prohibition of Chemical Weapons (with the rank of ambassador)	Asa Pitt	PA	Awaiting Senate Confirmation	

== Ambassadors at-large ==
Office	Ambassador	Background	Assumed office	Left office
Ambassador-at-Large for Industrial and Manufacturing Competitiveness	David MacNeil			
United States Ambassador-at-Large for Cyberspace and Digital Policy	Adam Cassady	PA	August 7, 2026 (Confirmed* August 7, 2026, 51–47); *En bloc confirmation of 74 nominees.	
Ambassador at Large, Coordinator of United States Government Activities to Combat HIV/AIDS Globally	Johnny Figueroa	PA	Awaiting Senate confirmation	
Ambassador-at-Large for Health Security and Diplomacy	Johnny Figueroa	PA	Awaiting Senate confirmation	
Ambassador-at-Large for the Arctic	Julia Nesheiwat	PA	Awaiting Senate confirmation	
Ambassador-at-Large for International Religious Freedom	Cissie Graham Lynch	PA	Awaiting Senate confirmation	

== Trade representatives ==
Office	Ambassador	Background	Assumed office	Left office
United States Trade Representative (with the rank of ambassador)	Jamieson Greer	PA	February 27, 2025 (Confirmed February 26, 2025, 56–43)	
Deputy United States Trade Representative for the Office of Geneva (with the rank of ambassador)	Joseph Barloon	PA	October 14, 2025 (Confirmed* October 7, 2025, 51–47); *En bloc confirmation of 107 nominees.	
Deputy Trade Representative (Asia, Textiles, Investment, Services, and Intellectual Property)	Bryan Switzer	PA	September 19, 2025 (Confirmed* September 18, 2025, 51–44); *En bloc confirmation of 48 nominees.	
Deputy United States Trade Representative (Africa, Western Hemisphere, Europe, the Middle East, Environment, Labor, and Industrial Competitiveness	Jeffrey Goettman	PA	December 2025 (Confirmed* December 18, 2025, 53–43); *En bloc confirmation of 97 nominees.	
Chief Agricultural Negotiator of Office of the United States Trade Representative	Julie Callahan	PA	December 31, 2025 (Confirmed* December 18, 2025, 53–43); *En bloc confirmation of 97 nominees.	

== Other positions with rank of ambassador ==
Office	Ambassador	Background	Assumed office	Left office
Chief of Protocol (with the rank of ambassador)	Monica Crowley	PA	May 30, 2025 (Confirmed May 12, 2025, 52–45)	
Coordinator for Counterterrorism (with the rank of ambassador)	Gregory LoGerfo	CD	May 21, 2026 (Confirmed* May 18, 2026, 46–43); *En bloc confirmation of 49 nominees.	
Special Envoy to Monitor and Combat Anti-Semitism (with the rank of ambassador)	Yehuda Kaploun	PA	December 22, 2025 (Confirmed* December 18, 2025, 53–43); *En bloc confirmation of 97 nominees.	
Director of the Office to Monitor and Combat Trafficking (with the rank of ambassador)	Barbera Thornhill	PA	October 13, 2026 (Confirmed* August 7, 2026, 51–47); *En bloc confirmation of 74 nominees.	
Special Presidential Envoy for Hostage Affairs (with the rank of ambassador)	John Coale	PA	Awaiting Senate Confirmation	

== Special envoys, representatives, and coordinators ==
Office	Appointee	Background	Assumed office	Left office
Special Presidential Envoy for Special Missions	Richard Grenell	PA	January 20, 2025	
Special Envoy for Greenland	Jeff Landry	PA	December 22, 2025	
Special Envoy for Latin America	Mauricio Claver-Carone	PA	January 20, 2025	
Special Envoy for Middle East	Steve Witkoff	PA	January 20, 2025	
Deputy Special Envoy for Middle East	Morgan Ortagus	PA	January 20, 2025	June 15, 2025
Special Envoy for Ukraine	Keith Kellogg	PA	January 20, 2025	December 31, 2025
Special Envoy to the United Kingdom	Mark Burnett	PA	January 20, 2025	
Special Envoy for Belarus	John Coale	PA	November 10, 2025	
Special Presidential Envoy for American Tourism, Exceptionalism, and Values	Nick Adams	PA	March 17, 2026	

== Withdrawn candidates ==
Office	Nominee	Announced	Withdrawn
Special Envoy for Hostage Affairs	Adam Boehler	December 4, 2024	March 14, 2025
Representative to the United Nations and Representative in the Security Council of the United Nations (with the rank of ambassador)	Elise Stefanik	November 10, 2024	March 27, 2025
Ambassador to Serbia	Mark Brnovich	April 29, 2025	October 2, 2025
Ambassador to Colombia	Dan Newlin	December 11, 2024	January 3, 2026
Ambassador to Kuwait	Amer Ghalib	March 7, 2025	January 3, 2026
Ambassador to Malaysia	Nick Adams	July 9, 2025	January 3, 2026
Ambassador-at-Large for International Religious Freedom	Mark Walker	April 10, 2025	January 8, 2026
Ambassador to El Salvador	Troy Edgar	January 29, 2026	April 13, 2026
Ambassador to Guatemala	Juan Rodriguez	March 9, 2026	July 14, 2026
Representative on the Council of the International Civil Aviation Organization (with the rank of ambassador)	Jeffrey Anderson	January 13, 2026	September 17, 2026

== See also ==
- List of ambassadors appointed in the first Trump presidency
- Political appointments of the second Trump administration

== Notes ==
Confirmation votes

Confirmations by roll call vote

Confirmations by voice vote
