= Susan K. Falatko =

American diplomat

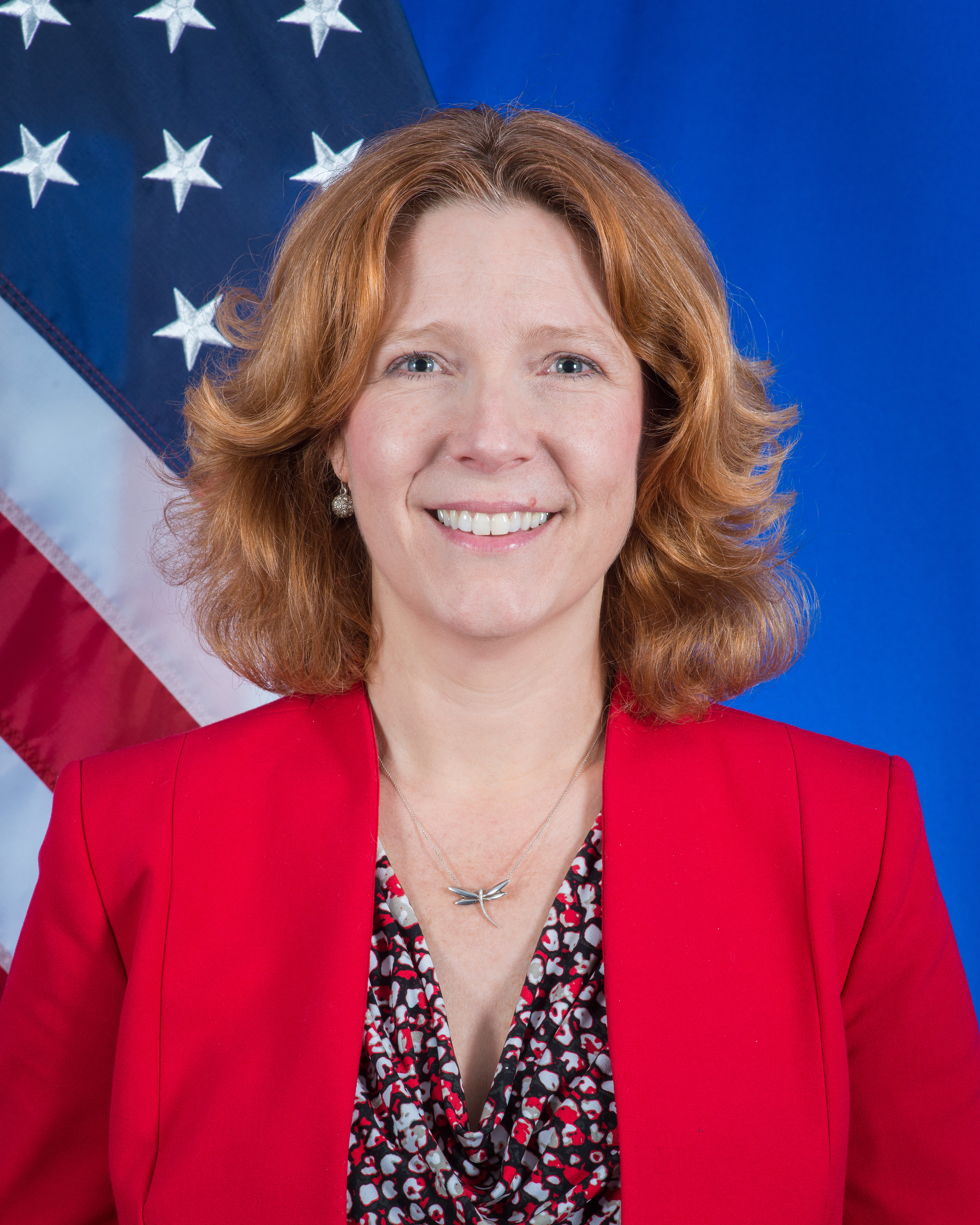
- Official portrait, 2022

United States Ambassador to Slovenia
- Chargé d’Affaires
- In office January 20, 2021 – February 17, 2022
- President: Joe Biden
- Preceded by: Lynda Blanchard
- Succeeded by: Jamie L. Harpootlian

Personal details
- Education: University of Iowa (BS); George Washington University (MS)

Susan K. Falatko is an American diplomat who had served Chargé d'affaires to Bulgaria from February 18 to May 16, 2025. She had served as U.S. Chargé d’Affaires ad interim to Slovenia between January 20, 2021 – February 17, 2022.

== Early life and education ==
Falatko graduated from the University of Iowa in 1990 with a Bachelor of Science in psychology, and in 1997, a Master of Science in international relations from George Washington University. She is fluent in English, French and Spanish.

== Career ==
Falatko has a lengthy career serving in numerous positions in the Department of State. Originally, she served as an economic advisor in Bamako between 1999 and 2001, Havana between 2001 and 2003, and Sarajevo between 2006 and 2009. Falatko later served as Deputy head of mission at the United States Embassy in Mauritius and Seychelles between 2013 and 2016, and then served another role in 2017 at the Western Balkans.

On January 20, 2021, Falatko became the U.S. Chargé d’Affaires ad interim to Slovenia after the inauguration of Joe Biden, succeeding Lynda Blanchard. She remained in this position until February 17, 2022, after Jamie L. Harpootlian presented her credentials.

Prior to joining the United States Department of State, she taught English in Tokyo, Bangkok, Prague, and Washington.
