= Office to Monitor and Combat Trafficking in Persons =

USA government agency

- Seal of the United States Department of State

Agency overview
- Formed: 2001; 25 years ago
- Jurisdiction: Executive branch of the United States
- Agency executive: Barbera Thornhill, Ambassador-at-Large
- Parent department: U.S. Department of State
- Website: Official website

The Office to Monitor and Combat Trafficking in Persons (J/TIP) is an agency within the United States Department of State charged with investigating and creating programs to prevent human trafficking both within the United States and internationally. The office also presents the Trafficking in Persons Report annually to Congress, concerning human trafficking in the U.S. and other nations. This report aims to raise awareness about human exploitation and trafficking, and to prevent it. The office's goals are to make the public aware, protect victims, take legal action against violators, establish necessary and just sentences for criminals, and train law enforcement individuals. The office is led by the United States Ambassador-at-Large to Monitor and Combat Trafficking in Persons.

== History ==
The Office to Monitor and Combat Trafficking in Persons was established in October 2001 as a result of the passing of the Trafficking Victims Protection Act of 2000. This enabling legislation required the President to create a bureau within the State Department to specifically address human trafficking and exploitation on all levels and to take legal action against perpetrators. Additionally, this act was designed to also enforce all laws within the Thirteenth Amendment to the United States Constitution that apply.

Currently, there is a U.S. Law on Trafficking in Persons, the Trafficking Victims Protection Act (TVPA), which has been reauthorized several times, most recently in March 2013.

== Trafficking in Persons Report ==
The Office to Monitor and Combat Trafficking in Persons monitors human trafficking and prosecutes perpetrators. It divides nations into tiers based on their compliance with standards outlined in the TVPA.

== Officials ==
=== Directors ===
- Ambassador Nancy Ely-Raphel (2001–2002)
- Ambassador-at-Large John R. Miller (2002–2006)
- Ambassador-at-Large Mark P. Lagon (2007–2009)
- Ambassador-at-Large Luis CdeBaca (2009–2014)
- Ambassador-at-Large Susan P. Coppedge (2015–2017)
- Ambassador-at-Large John Cotton Richmond (2018–2021)
- Ambassador-at-Large Cindy Dyer (2023–2025)
- Ambassador-at-Large Barbera Thornhill (2026–present)

=== Deputy directors ===
- Laura Lederer (2001–2002)
- JoAnn Schneider (2002–2005)
- Paula Goode (2005–2008)
- Nan Kennelly (2008– )
- Alison Keihl Friedman (2011–2017)

== Reporting trafficking in the US ==
Individuals may call the National Human Trafficking Resource Center (1-888-373-7888) to report a potential case of human trafficking; to connect with local anti-trafficking services; or to request training and technical assistance, general information, or specific anti-trafficking resources. The hotline is funded by the Department of Health and Human Services, but is operated by Polaris Project, a non-governmental organization. Victims can call for help, even if they are undocumented. Victims are commonly trafficked internationally as well as within their own countries.
