= E. Allan Wendt =

American diplomat (born 1935)

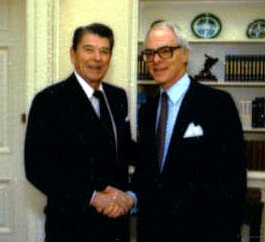
- Wendt (right) shaking hands with Ronald Reagan in 1988

1st United States Ambassador to Slovenia
- In office May 26, 1993 – September 12, 1995
- President: Bill Clinton
- Preceded by: Office established
- Succeeded by: Victor Jackovich

Personal details
- Born: 1935 (age 90–91) Illinois, U.S.
- Profession: Diplomat

E. Allan Wendt (born 1935) is an American diplomat. He was the first United States Ambassador to Slovenia from 1993 to 1995.

== Biography ==
Wendt was born in 1935 in Illinois. He joined the U.S. Foreign Service in 1959. On January 31, 1968, he was the duty officer serving at the U.S. Embassy in Saigon, South Vietnam, when it was attacked by Vietcong guerrillas.

On August 25, 1992, Wendt became the chargé d'affaires ad interim at the newly established U.S. Embassy in Ljubljana, Slovenia. On May 15, 1993, he was appointed by President Clinton to become the U.S. Ambassador to Slovenia, and he presented his credentials on May 26, 1993. He was superseded on September 12, 1995.

Wendt holds a Master of Public Administration (economics) from Harvard, a Certificat d’Etudes Politiques from the Institut d’Etudes Politiques in Paris, and a BA magna cum laude from Yale.

Diplomatic posts
Preceded by post created	United States Ambassador to Slovenia; 1993–1995	Succeeded by Victor Jackovich
