= United States Ambassador-at-Large to Monitor and Combat Trafficking in Persons =

USA anti-human-trafficking diplomat

Ambassador-at-Large of the United States to Monitor and Combat Trafficking in Persons
- Seal of the United States Department of State

- Incumbent; Barbera Thornhill since October 13, 2026
- Nominator: President of the United States
- Inaugural holder: Nancy Ely-Raphel
- Formation: 2001
- Website: Official website

The United States ambassador-at-large to monitor and combat trafficking in persons is the head of the Office to Monitor and Combat Trafficking in Persons in the United States Department of State. The ambassador-at-large advises the United States secretary of state and the under secretary of state for foreign assistance, humanitarian affairs, and religious freedom directly and formulates U.S. policy on human trafficking. As the head of the Office to Monitor and Combat Trafficking in Persons, this Ambassador also has the rank of Assistant Secretary.

Nancy Ely-Raphel served as the first U.S. Ambassador-at-Large (2001–2002). She was followed by John R. Miller (2002–2006), Mark P. Lagon (2007–2009), Luis CdeBaca (2009–2014), Susan P. Coppedge (2015–2018) and John Cotton Richmond (2018–2021).

== List of ambassadors ==
#	Image	Name	Appointment	Left office	President served under
1		Nancy Ely-Raphel	2001	2002	George W. Bush
2		John R. Miller	July 30, 2004	December 15, 2006	George W. Bush
3		Mark P. Lagon	May 31, 2007	January 20, 2009	George W. Bush
4		Luis CdeBaca	May 18, 2009	November 10, 2014	Barack Obama
-		Kari Johnstone (Acting)	November 10, 2014	October 19, 2015	Barack Obama
5		Susan P. Coppedge	October 19, 2015	July 21, 2017	Barack Obama
6		John Cotton Richmond	October 17, 2018	January 20, 2021	Donald Trump
7		Cindy Dyer	January 4, 2023	January 20, 2025	Joe Biden
-		Dave Williams (Acting)	April 20, 2026	October 13, 2026	Donald Trump
8		Barbera Thornhill	October 13, 2026	Present	Donald Trump
