= Nancy Halliday Ely-Raphel =

American diplomat (1937–2026)

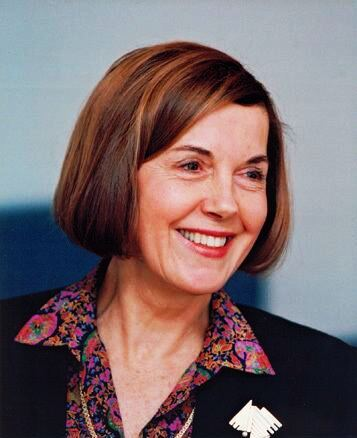

3rd United States Ambassador to Slovenia
- In office September 2, 1998 – September 27, 2001
- President: Bill Clinton
- Preceded by: Victor Jackovich
- Succeeded by: Johnny Young

1st United States Ambassador-at-Large to Monitor and Combat Trafficking in Persons
- In office 2001–2002
- Preceded by: Position established
- Succeeded by: John R. Miller

Personal details
- Born: Nancy Halliday; February 4, 1937
- Died: August 8, 2026 (aged 89)
- Spouse(s): Robert A. Duff (first husband; divorced); John Hart Ely (second husband; divorced); Arnold Lewis Raphel (third husband; 1987–1988; his death)
- Children: With Robert A. Duff: John D. Ely; Robert D. Ely
- Education: Syracuse University; University of Würzburg; University of San Diego
- Nickname: Nancy Ely

Nancy Halliday Ely-Raphel (February 4, 1937 – August 8, 2026) was an American diplomat. She was the United States Ambassador to Slovenia from 1998 to 2001. From 2001 to 2003, she was the first Director of the U.S. State Department's Office to Monitor and Combat Trafficking in Persons.

== Life and career ==
=== Early life and education ===
Nancy Halliday was born on February 4, 1937, to Margaret Merritt Halliday and Thomas Clarkson Halliday. She had one brother, Thomas Clarkson Halliday III. She graduated from Syracuse University in New York and attended the University of Würzburg in Würzburg, Germany. In 1968, she graduated from University of San Diego School of Law with a juris doctor.

=== Career ===
Prior to joining the United States Department of State, she was a San Diego deputy city attorney, an Assistant United States Attorney in the Southern District of California, an Associate Dean of Boston University School of Law, and senior trial attorney with the U.S. Department of Justice's Organized Crime Strike Force.

Between 1975 and 2003, she served in a number of legal and policy positions in the State Department, including Assistant Legal Adviser for African Affairs and Nuclear Affairs, and Principal Deputy Assistant Secretary of State for Democracy, Human Rights and Labor, as well as Legal Adviser to the U.S. Embassy in Pakistan. From 1995 to 1998 she was Coordinator for Bosnia, and assisted in the implementation of the Dayton Peace Accords.

On June 29, 1998, she was appointed by President Clinton to be the third United States Ambassador to Slovenia. She presented her credentials on September 2, 1998, and left the post on September 27, 2001. From 2001 to 2003 she was Senior Advisor to the Secretary of State and the first Director of the State Department's Office to Monitor and Combat Trafficking in Persons, an office that she established. After that, she was the Counselor on International Law in the Department's Office of the Legal Adviser.

Following her State Department service, she served as vice president and managing director of Save the Children.

Ely-Raphel was a member of the American Academy of Diplomacy and the Council on Foreign Relations, and was a resident of the District of Columbia.

=== Personal life and death ===
Her first husband was Robert A. Duff, of Carlsbad, California. In 1971 she married her second husband, the legal scholar John Hart Ely. In 1987 she married her third husband, Arnold Lewis Raphel, the U.S. Ambassador to Pakistan, but she was widowed on August 17, 1988, when he was killed in a plane crash. In 2008, Ely-Raphel was described as the "companion of 12 years" of the late diplomat and spy novelist Samuel J. Hamrick, in his obituary.

Ely-Raphel had at least one child, Robert Duff Ely, an insurance defense lawyer in New York.

Ely-Raphel died on August 8, 2026, at the age of 89.

Diplomatic posts
Preceded by Victor Jackovich	United States Ambassador to Slovenia; 1998–2001	Succeeded by Johnny Young
