= Mark P. Lagon =

American political scientist and practitioner

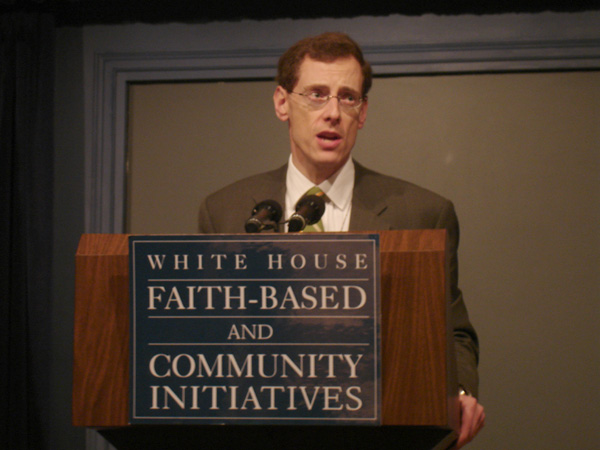
- Lagon at the Compassion in Action Roundtable on Human Trafficking in 2007.
- Born: 1965 (age 60–61)
- Education: Harvard University (BA); Georgetown University (PhD)
- Employer: Friends of the Global Fight Against AIDS, Tuberculosis, and Malaria
- Spouse: Susan

Mark P. Lagon

3rd United States Ambassador-at-Large to Monitor and Combat Trafficking in Persons
- In office May 31, 2007 – January 20, 2009
- President: George W. Bush
- Preceded by: John R. Miller
- Succeeded by: Luis CdeBaca

Mark P. Lagon (born 1965) is an American political scientist and practitioner. His areas of expertise include human rights, global health, human trafficking, and global institutions and governance. Lagon is the Chief Policy Officer at Friends of the Global Fight Against AIDS, Tuberculosis, and Malaria and a Distinguished Senior Scholar at Georgetown University's School of Foreign Service.

== Education ==
Lagon earned his B.A. in government from Harvard University, graduating magna cum laude in 1986. He earned his Ph.D. with distinction from Georgetown University in 1991. Lagon later published his dissertation as a book called The Reagan Doctrine: Sources of American Conduct in the Cold War’s Last Chapter (Praeger, 1994).

== Career ==
Between 1991 and 1993, Lagon worked at the American Enterprise Institute. He then became an analyst at the House Republican Policy Committee and later moved to the United States Senate Committee on Foreign Relations. In 2004, he became Deputy Assistant Secretary of State in International Organizational Affairs.

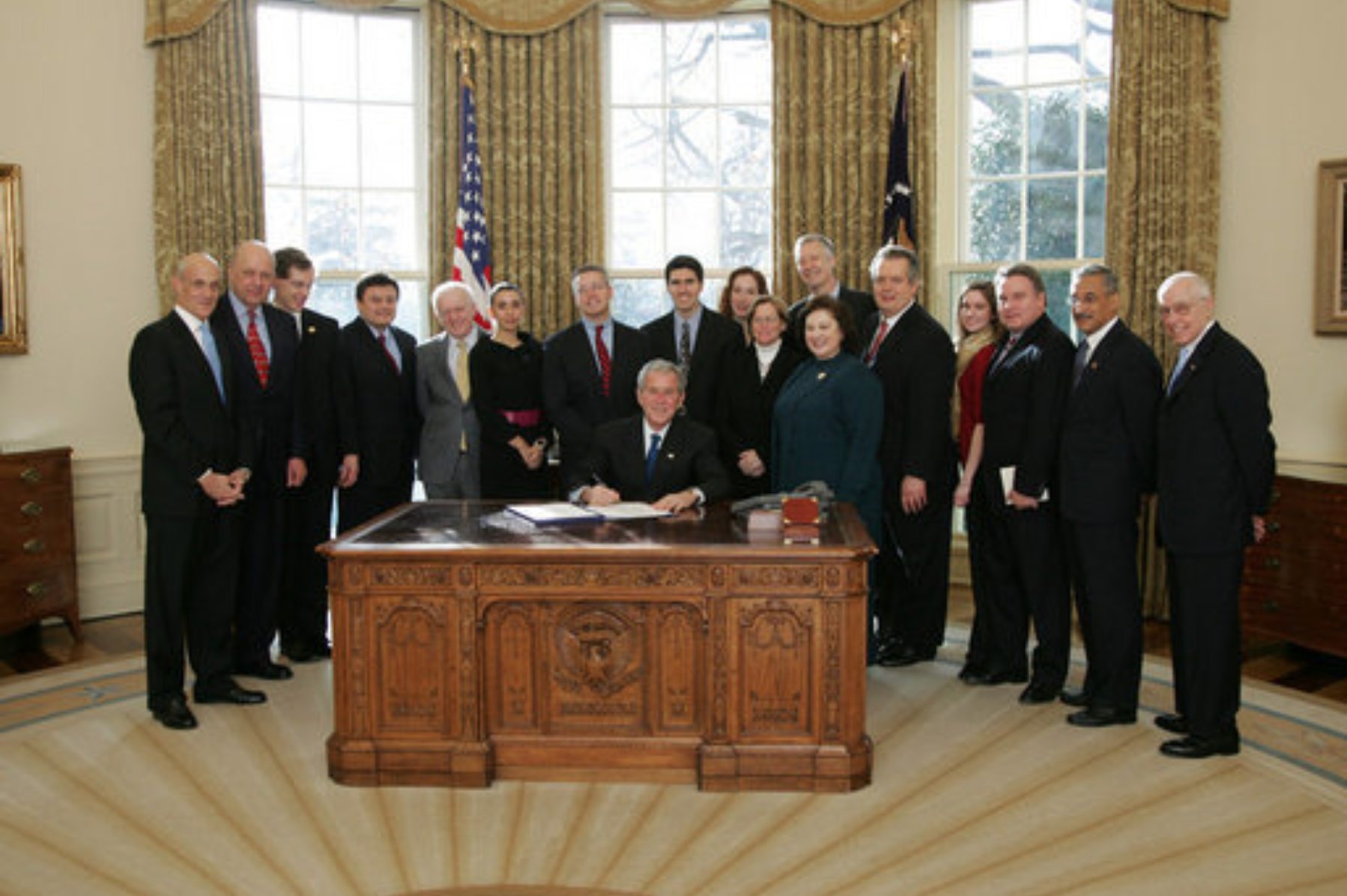
Lagon (third from left) as the William Wilberforce Trafficking Victims Protection Reauthorization Act of 2008 is signed into law.

In 2007, Lagon was nominated by President George W. Bush to serve as the U.S. Ambassador-at-Large to and Director of the Office to Monitor and Combat Trafficking in Persons. Following his ambassadorship at the State Department, Lagon became Executive Director and CEO of the Polaris Project.

Lagon then co-founded the Global Business Coalition Against Human Trafficking, a partnership of businesses addressing human trafficking in corporate activity around the world. In 2015, he was appointed President and CEO of Freedom House, a non-governmental organization that researches, advocates for, and assists the promotion of democracy and human rights globally.

Lagon returned to the Walsh School of Foreign Service in 2016. He was its inaugural Centennial Fellow and continues to be a Distinguished Senior Scholar. In 2017, he joined Friends of the Global Fight Against AIDS, Tuberculosis and Malaria, a US non-profit advocating for the Global Fund to Fight AIDS, Tuberculosis and Malaria, an international partnership between governments, businesses, and civil society to combat epidemics.

== Publications ==
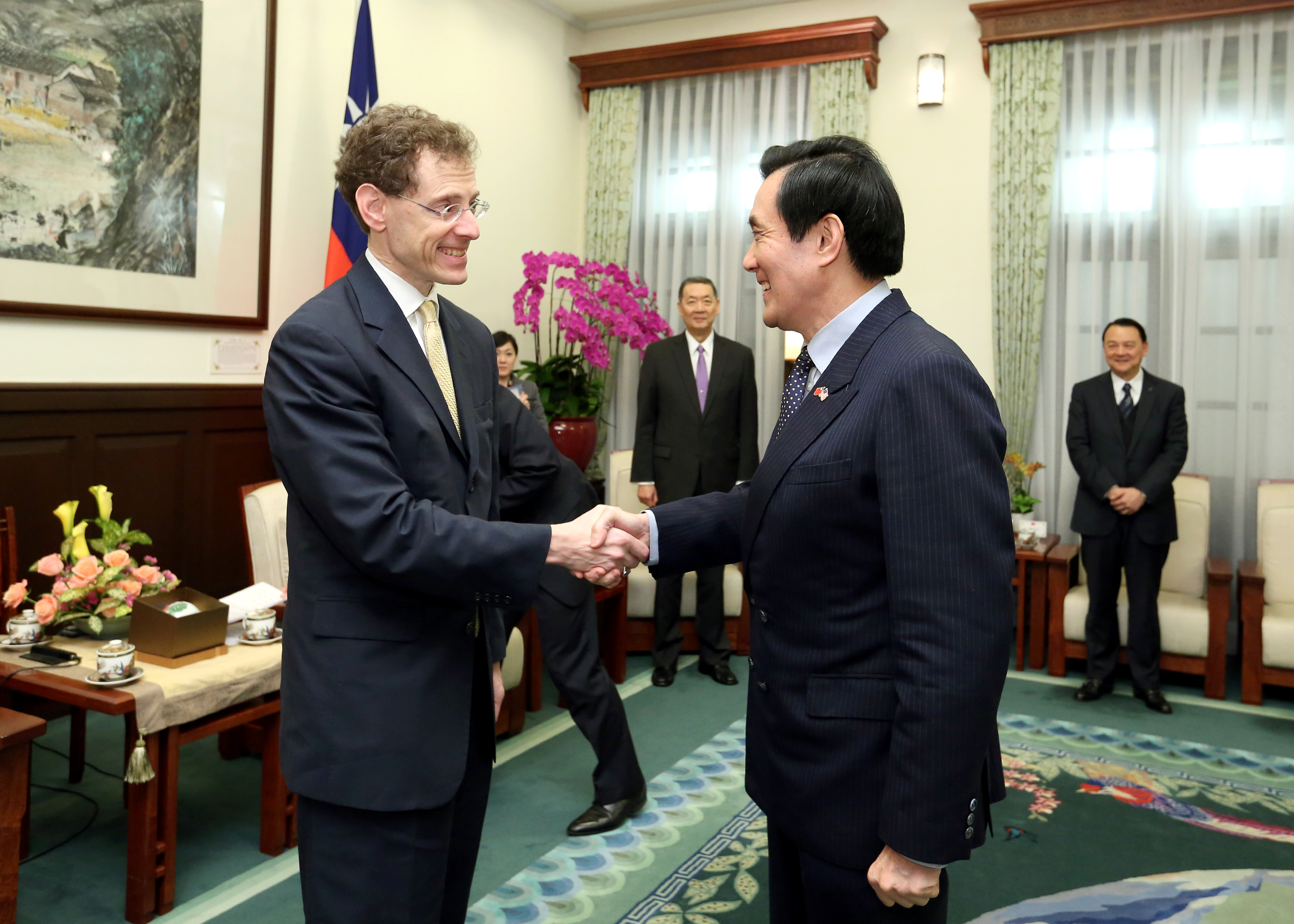
Lagon meeting Taiwanese President Ma Ying-jeou in 2016.

Lagon has published two books:

- Human Dignity and the Future of Global Institutions (co-edited with Anthony Clark Arend; Georgetown University Press, 2014)
- The Reagan Doctrine: Sources of American Conduct in the Cold War’s Last Chapter (sole author; Praeger, 1994)

His other works have been published in over 60 journals and newspapers. These journals include Perspectives on Political Science, Policy Review, Georgetown Journal of International Affairs, Journal of Political Science, The National Interest, and World Affairs. These newspapers include The Hill, Wall Street Journal, and Washington Post. Lagon has written a variety of pieces on behalf of Friends of the Global Fight Against AIDS, Tuberculosis and Malaria.

== Personal life ==
Lagon is the son of World War II-era Polish refugees and was raised in Concord, Massachusetts. He is married to Dr. Susan Lagon, a political scientist and longtime Senior Fellow at Georgetown University.
