= Luis CdeBaca =

United States diplomat (born 1967)

Luis C.deBaca
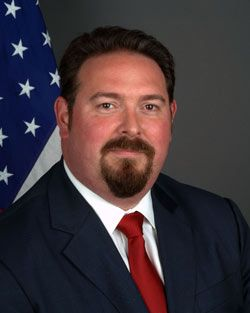

4th United States Ambassador-at-Large to Monitor and Combat Trafficking in Persons
- In office May 18, 2009 – November 10, 2014
- President: Barack Obama
- Preceded by: Mark P. Lagon
- Succeeded by: Susan P. Coppedge

Personal details
- Born: 1967 (age 58–59) Iowa, U.S.
- Education: Iowa State University; University of Michigan, Ann Arbor

Luis C.deBaca is an American lawyer and diplomat who served in the Obama administration as Ambassador-at-Large to Monitor and Combat Trafficking in Persons and as Director of the Department of Justice's Office of Sex Offender Sentencing, Monitoring, Apprehending, Registering, and Tracking (SMART Office).

== Public service career ==
=== Department of Justice (1993–2007) ===
After graduating from the University of Michigan Law School, C.deBaca was hired by the Department of Justice as a civil rights prosecutor. He investigated and prosecuted cases involving human trafficking, official misconduct, and hate crimes, as well as money laundering, organised crime, and alien smuggling. He became the Department's Involuntary Servitude and Slavery Coordinator and later the Chief Counsel of the U.S. Human Trafficking Prosecutions Unit upon its founding. During this time, C.deBaca developed the modern "victim-centered approach" to investigating human trafficking cases cooperatively with non-governmental organizations and those who advocated for workers and survivors of prostitution and sexual abuse. Among other cases, he prosecuted the high-profile "Deaf Mexican" forced labor case; the garment factory case United States v. Kil Soo Lee, the largest slavery case in US history; and the pathbreaking Cadena case, which applied the Thirteenth Amendment to forced prostitution and impelled legislative efforts to update the slavery statutes. C.deBaca also pursued other civil rights cases, for instance, obtaining the conviction of a man who used a Confederate Flag to intimidate an African-American family in the exercise of their housing rights.

As a result of these cases, C.deBaca received the Attorney General's John Marshall Award from Attorney General Janet Reno and the Distinguished Service Award from Attorney General John Ashcroft. He worked with Senators Paul Wellstone and Sam Brownback, and with Representatives Chris Smith and Sam Gejdenson and their staff to incorporate the interagency model and victim-centered approach into the Victims of Trafficking and Violence Protection Act of 2000. In recognition of his work on behalf of survivors, he received the highest award of the victim services community, the Freedom Network's Paul & Sheila Wellstone Award.

=== House Committee on the Judiciary ===
From 2007 to 2009, C.deBaca served on detail as Counsel to the House Judiciary Committee under Rep. John Conyers Jr. In this role, C.deBaca advised Chairman Conyers and other committee members on immigration reform, civil liberties—especially the Foreign Intelligence Surveillance Act—and civil rights issues such as involuntary servitude.

=== US Department of State ===
In March 2009, President Barack Obama nominated C.deBaca to be Ambassador-at-Large to Monitor and Combat Trafficking in Persons. The United States Senate confirmed C.deBaca on 6 May 2009. As the director of the Office to Monitor and Combat Trafficking in Persons, he led U.S. government activities in the global fight against contemporary forms of slavery.

As ambassador, C.deBaca continued his victim-centered approach to human trafficking prosecution. He drove change across U.S. government agencies, leading the Cabinet-level President's Interagency Task Force on Trafficking (PITF) and the interagency Senior Policy Operating Group, resulting in the development of the US Victim Services Strategy, and Executive Order to prevent exploitation in government contracting. He published the "gold standard" snapshot of global anti-trafficking efforts, the Trafficking in Persons Report and conducted extensive bilateral and multilateral diplomacy, pressing for governments to apply the 3P paradigm of Prevention, Protection, and Prosecution, as set forth in the TVPA and the United Nations Protocol to Prevent, Suppress and Punish Trafficking in Persons, especially Women and Children.

As in the Civil Rights Division, C.deBaca rooted his work as ambassador in the United States' own struggle against slavery, and supported efforts such as Historians Against Slavery, The National Trust for Historic Preservation's President Lincoln's Cottage where the Emancipation Proclamation was written, the Frederick Douglass Family Foundation, and the National Underground Railroad Freedom Center, whose film Journey to Freedom combined the story of Twelve Years a Slave's Solomon Northup with modern abolitionists and survivors.

In addition to pressing for more prosecution of traffickers and protection of victims, C.deBaca pushed for changes to the root causes that fuel modern slavery by addressing the impact of unregulated supply chains on forced labor and the culture of acceptance and exploitation that fuels sex trafficking. Through programs like Slavery Footprint, Ambassador C.deBaca increased attention on supply-chain transparency in agriculture, fisheries, mining, and garment sectors, challenging companies to "focus on the front end of their supply chains in the places from which they obtain raw materials to begin the fight against slavery." His testimony to the UK Parliament was heavily cited in the report from the Joint Committee on the Draft Modern Slavery Bill and included in the United Kingdom's Modern Slavery Act 2015.

=== Department of Justice (2014–2017) ===
In November 2014, President Obama appointed C.deBaca as Director of the Justice Department's Office of Sex Offender Sentencing, Monitoring, Apprehending, Registering, and Tracking (“SMART Office”) where he was responsible for implementing the Adam Walsh Act's comprehensive set of minimum standards for sex offender registration and notification in the United States. C.deBaca convened and supported law enforcement, policymakers, and academics to develop strategies and programs for combating sexual assault and protect communities, aligning scientific evidence on effective sex offender management and prevention with policy and practice. He spearheaded new methods of sex offender management, research, and prevention through the Office's Sex Offender Management Assessment and Planning Initiative (SOMAPI), Native American Sex Offender Management (NASOM) program, and campus sexual assault initiative. He worked to prevent international sex tourism through the passage of Representative Chris Smith's International Megan's Law, and developed new guidelines that balanced treatment and community safety in registration programs for juvenile offenders.

== Personal life ==
C.deBaca was raised on a cattle ranch in Iowa and was active in 4-H and politics from an early age, winning the 1984 National 4-H Beef Award and supporting such candidates as U.S. Senator Tom Harkin. His family has been in what is now the United States since the explorations of Álvar Núñez Cabeza de Vaca in 1527. In the ensuing years, his family has played a prominent role in New Mexico politics and culture, including the first Hispanic Governor Ezequiel Cabeza De Baca (1917), Lieutenant Governor Luis C.deBaca (1937), and the education pioneer and Latina author Fabiola Cabeza de Baca Gilbert. He graduated from Iowa State University and attended the University of Michigan Law School where he was editor of the Michigan Law Review.

C.deBaca is Roman Catholic and has cited Gaudium et Spes and the Second Vatican Council as inspirations for his anti-slavery public service. In a 2009 interview with Catholic News Service C.deBaca said, "the notion of the church in the world is... about going out and really engaging the community, engaging the broader community." In a 2012 speech to Canadian parliamentarians urging a victim-centric approach to human trafficking prosecution, Cde Baca stated, "There is the notion in the Christian tradition that Jesus went out of his way not just to be seen with the woman in prostitution, but to honor her, to put in check those who would say she was not worthy of attention."

Diplomatic posts
Preceded by Mark P. Lagon	United States Ambassador-at-Large to Monitor and Combat Trafficking in Persons; 2009–2014	Succeeded by Susan Coppedge
