= Yousif Ghafari =

American architect (born 1952)

Yousif B. Ghafari
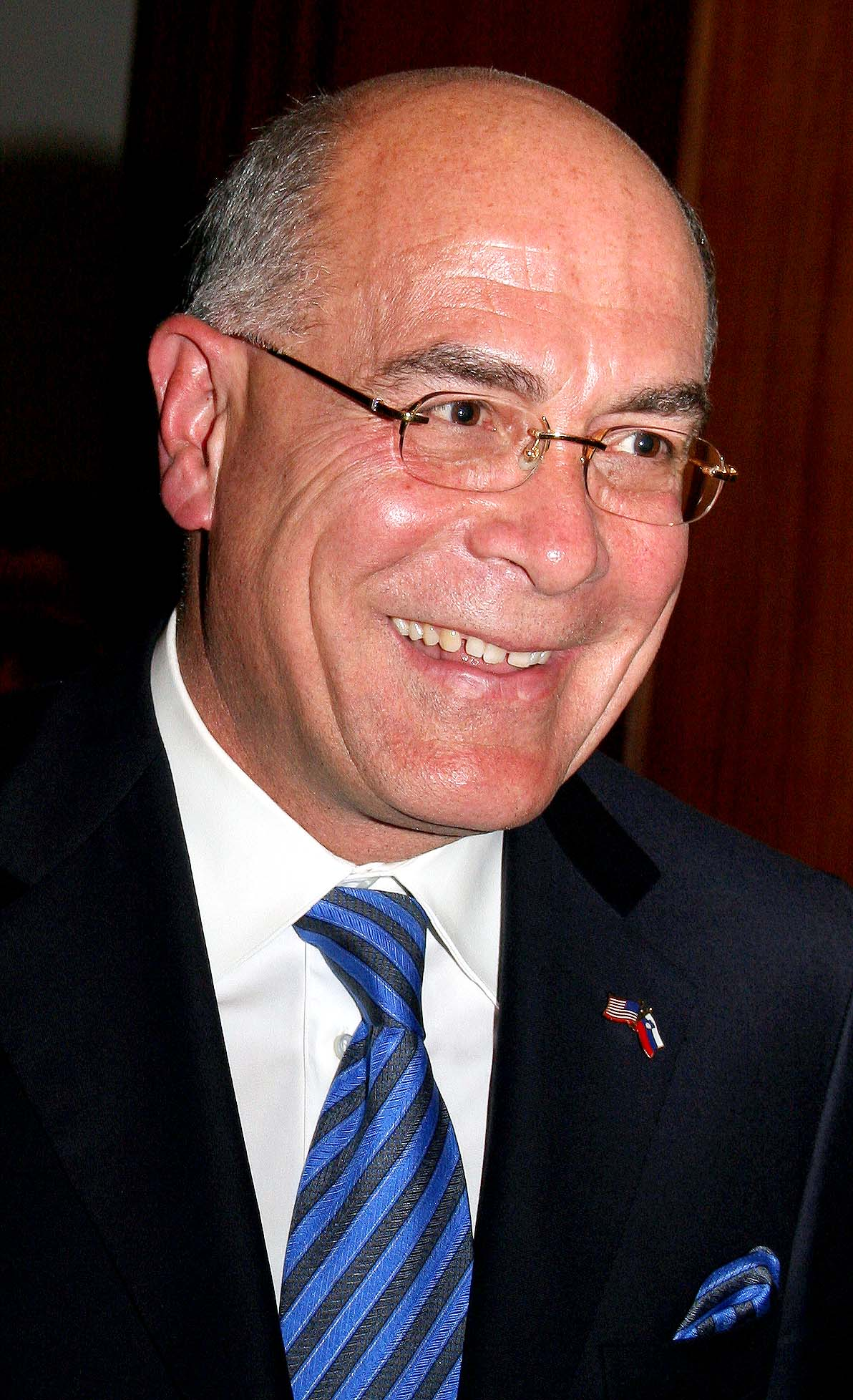

United States Ambassador to Slovenia
- In office May 29, 2008 – January 20, 2009
- President: George W. Bush
- Preceded by: Thomas Bolling Robertson
- Succeeded by: Joseph A. Mussomeli

Personal details
- Born: September 27, 1952 (age 73) Alma El-Chaab, Lebanon
- Profession: Diplomat

Yousif Boutrous Ghafari (sometimes Youssef B. Ghafari, born September 27, 1952) is an American businessman of Lebanese birth, owner of architectural firm Ghafari Associates LLC, former United States Ambassador to Slovenia. During the Senate confirmation hearings, then-Senator Barack Obama called Ghafari "an immigrant who has truly lived the American dream."

Born in Alma El-Chaab, Lebanon, "in a home with no electricity, phone or running water," Ghafari moved to the United States in 1972. He received his Bachelor of Arts degree in Mathematics in 1974, a Master of Arts in Applied Mathematics and Computer Applications in 1975, and a Master of Science in Chemical Engineering in 1977, from Wayne State University.

In 2004 and 2005, Ghafari was a public delegate to the United Nations General Assembly.

His alma mater named one of its residence halls in his honor after he donated $9 million to the school. The school gave him an honorary Doctor of Laws degree on May 3, 2008. He was notified of the degree the same week the Senate confirmed his ambassadorship.

A significant donor to the Republican party, Ghafari is considered one of "the active, vocal and successful Republican leaders of the Michigan Arab-American community."

On May 25, 2008, Ghafari presented his diplomatic credentials to Dimitrij Rupel in Ljubljana. He was received by Slovenian President Danilo Türk on May 29. He climbed Mount Triglav, making him "an honorary Slovenian." On January 20, 2009, when Barack Obama was sworn in as U. S. President, Ghafari's term ended.

Diplomatic posts
Preceded by Thomas Bolling Robertson	United States Ambassador to Slovenia; 2008–2009	Succeeded by Joseph A. Mussomeli
