= John Miller (Washington politician) =

American politician (1938–2017)

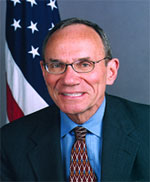

Member of the U.S. House of Representatives from Washington's 1st district
- In office January 3, 1985 – January 3, 1993
- Preceded by: Joel Pritchard
- Succeeded by: Maria Cantwell

President of the Seattle City Council
- In office August 14, 1978 – January 3, 1980
- Preceded by: Phyllis Lamphere
- Succeeded by: Paul Kraabel

2nd United States Ambassador-at-Large to Monitor and Combat Trafficking in Persons
- In office July 30, 2004 – December 15, 2006
- President: George W. Bush
- Preceded by: Nancy Ely-Raphel
- Succeeded by: Mark P. Lagon

Personal details
- Born: John Ripin Miller; May 23, 1938 New York City, New York, U.S.
- Died: October 4, 2017 (aged 79) Corte Madera, California, U.S.
- Citizenship: United States
- Party: Republican
- Education: Bucknell University (BA); Yale University (MA, LLB)

John Ripin Miller (May 23, 1938 – October 4, 2017) was an American politician who served as a member of the United States House of Representatives from 1985 to 1993. He represented the 1st congressional district of Washington as a Republican. While in Congress he was an advocate of human rights in the Soviet Union, China, and South Africa.

== Biography ==
Miller received his LL.B. from Yale Law School and an MA in Economics from Yale Graduate School in 1964. He graduated with a BA from Bucknell University in 1959, where he was a member of Tau Kappa Epsilon fraternity, and served as an Army Infantry officer on active duty in 1960 and later in the U.S. Army Reserves.

Miller did not run for re-election in 1992. Prior to being elected congressman, he was active in state and municipal governments, serving as assistant attorney general for Washington; vice president and legal counsel for the Washington Environmental Council; and Seattle City Councilman (1972–1979). Miller's first campaign for the City Council was tied to saving the Pike Place Market and while on the Council he oversaw the rehabilitation of the Market. He founded Seattle's urban P-Patch program, a gardening allotment program that was first of its kind in the nation which includes at least 90 sites as of 2016. Miller led the Council in rejecting Seattle's entry into Washington Public Power Supply System nuclear plants 4 and 5 (Satsop nuclear power plant) which later went bankrupt, and unsuccessfully sought the demolition of the Alaska Way Viaduct separating Seattle's downtown from its waterfront.

Miller served as the director, Office to Monitor and Combat Trafficking in Persons for the U.S. State Department, with the rank of Ambassador-at-Large, starting in 2002. He sought to increase public awareness of modern-day slavery and nurture a worldwide abolitionist movement with the United States in the lead. Miller resigned effective December 15, 2006, to join the faculty of George Washington University. He later taught at Yale University and was named a visiting scholar at the Institute for Governmental Studies at the University of California, Berkeley. Miller served as a distinguished senior fellow in international affairs and human rights with the Discovery Institute. Prior to his time at State, he had served as the chair of the institute, and was an English teacher at Northwest Yeshiva High School in Mercer Island, Washington.

On October 4, 2017, Miller died in Corte Madera, California from cancer at the age of 79.

== See also ==
- List of Jewish members of the United States Congress

U.S. House of Representatives
Preceded by Joel Pritchard	Member of the U.S. House of Representatives from Washington's 1st congressional district 1985–1993	Succeeded by Maria Cantwell
