= Victor Jackovich =

American diplomat (born 1948)

Victor Jackovich (born April 24, 1948) is an American diplomat and former ambassador who was the first United States Ambassador to Bosnia and Herzegovina. He later became Ambassador to Slovenia.

== Early life and education ==
Victor Jackovich was born in Des Moines, Iowa, on April 24, 1948, to Mary and Victor Sr. He has a much younger sister named Janet who married in 1983 and became Janet Clark. He is a graduate of Indiana University Bloomington, where he studied in the Russian and East European Institute and received both a bachelor's degree and a master's degree (awarded in 1971).

As a career officer in the U.S. Foreign Service, he held assignments in Kiev (1979–1980), where he helped to start the first U.S. government office in Ukraine; Bucharest (1980–1983); Nairobi (1983–1986); Moscow (1988–1990); and Sofia, Bulgaria (1991). He is fluent in several languages. In 1990 and 1991 he directed the U.S. Department of State's Task Force on the Balkan crisis and in 1992 and 1993 he led U.S. delegations to international conferences on the Balkans. In 1992, during the dissolution of the Soviet Union, he led the first U.S. representation to the newly independent state of Moldova.

== Ambassadorships ==
On May 12, 1992, he was appointed as the first U.S. Ambassador to Bosnia and Herzegovina. He presented his credentials the following year, on June 23, 1993, and opened the U.S. embassy in Sarajevo in 1994. His role as ambassador there from 1992 to 1995 was largely focused on negotiating with the warring factions in support of American objectives in the region. In 1994 he was awarded the U.S. government's Distinguished Presidential Award (1994) for diplomatic service. The Republic of Bosnia and Herzegovina recognized his service in 1995 with the Golden Eagle Award, the country's national medal. In 2000 the University of Sarajevo gave him an honorary degree and he was named an honorary citizen of Sarajevo.

Jackovich left his position in Bosnia in April 1995 and was appointed Ambassador to Slovenia in September of that year. As Ambassador to Slovenia from 1995 to 1998, he participated in organizing the establishment of U.S. government operations in the country, which efforts contributed to Slovenia's subsequent memberships in NATO and the European Union.

== Later career ==
In 1998 and 1999, Jackovich led the U.S. delegation to the Royaumont Process, linking U.S., European and other international efforts in southeastern Europe. He was the 1998 recipient of the American Bar Association's Max Kampelman Award for "advancing the rule of law in Central and Eastern Europe and the former Soviet Union," and in 1999 he received the Serb Civic Society Award. From 1999 to 2002, he served as associate director of the George Marshall European Center for Security Studies in Garmisch, Germany, a U.S. Department of Defense training institute for military and political leadership in Eastern Europe and the former Soviet Union.

In 2002 and 2003, following the September 11 attacks in the United States in 2001, Jackovich undertook an assignment as the U.S. government's Senior Political Advisor for U.S. Military Operations in Afghanistan, working from Bagram Air Base. In this position he was responsible for providing policy direction and recommendations to military, security and counter-terrorism operations in Afghanistan, Pakistan and Central Asia. He played a key role in the founding of the Tripartite Commission, a high-level gathering of American, Afghan and Pakistani military and government officials developing policies on cross-border terrorism, and he served as the U.S. representative to the commission. In 2003, he received the Distinguished Civilian Service Award, conferred by the Chairman of the Joint Chiefs of Staff for "policy guidance provided and special programs designed for the U.S. European Command – EUCOM – in order to accelerate integration of new democracies of Eastern Europe and former Soviet Union into NATO and Euro-Atlantic associations."

In 2004, he retired from the U.S. government with 33 years of service. In the following year, he became Senior Associate at the Center for Strategic and International Studies in Washington, D.C. He now works as a consultant to U.S. defense contractors and other entities, serving both as president of the Washington-based consulting firm Jackovich International and vice president for international relations for Ervin Technical Associates. Currently he is also U.S. representative on the European Union's Business Advisory Council for Southeast Europe and a member of the board of trustees of a northern Italian and central European business and policy association.

Jackovich is married to Deborah Jones, also a U.S. diplomat. Jackovich has one son.

Diplomatic posts
Preceded by None (new post)	United States Ambassador to Bosnia and Herzegovina; 1992–1995	Succeeded by John K. Menzies
Preceded by E. Allan Wendt	United States Ambassador to Slovenia; 1995–1998	Succeeded by Nancy Halliday Ely-Raphel
