= Thomas Bolling Robertson =

American diplomat (born 1950)

Thomas B. Robertson
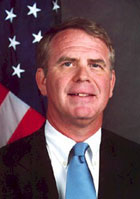

United States Ambassador to Slovenia
- In office September 29, 2004 – August 20, 2007
- President: George W. Bush
- Preceded by: Johnny Young
- Succeeded by: Yousif Ghafari

Personal details
- Spouse: Antoinette Scala Robertson
- Children: Thomas and Elizabeth
- Education: Princeton University (BD); Johns Hopkins School of International Affairs (Master's degree)

Thomas Bolling Robertson (born 1950) was a career foreign service officer, ambassador, and member of the Senior Foreign Service with the rank of Minister-Counselor. He was the U.S. Ambassador to Slovenia 2004–2007. President George W. Bush nominated Robertson as U.S. Ambassador to Slovenia on February 6, 2004. The U.S. Senate confirmed his nomination on August 6, 2004, and he was sworn in by Secretary Powell as ambassador on September 16, 2004. After his return from Slovenia, he was the Dean of the Leadership and Management School of the Foreign Service Institute of the Department of State from 2007 until his retirement in 2010.

Ambassador Robertson served twice at the American embassy in Budapest, Hungary, as Chief of the Political Section (1990–1993) and as the Deputy Chief of Mission (DCM) from 1998 until March 2001. From March until August 2001, he served in Hungary as the U.S. Chargé d'Affaires a.i. Between tours in Budapest, Ambassador Robertson served as the Law Enforcement Counselor at the American embassy in Moscow from 1995 to 1997. Ambassador Robertson was the Director for Russian Affairs at the National Security Council from 2001 to 2002 when he returned to the Department of State to serve as a Career Development Officer in the Senior Level Division of the Bureau of Human Resources.

Ambassador Robertson is retired and has served on a number of NGO boards, most recently for AFS-USA, a student exchange organization, from 2011 to 2017.

== Sources ==
- United States Department of State: Biography of Thomas B. Robertson
- United States Embassy in Ljubljana: Biography of the ambassador

Diplomatic posts
Preceded by Johnny Young	United States Ambassador to Slovenia; 2004–2008	Succeeded by Yousif Ghafari
