= Cindy Dyer =

American attorney

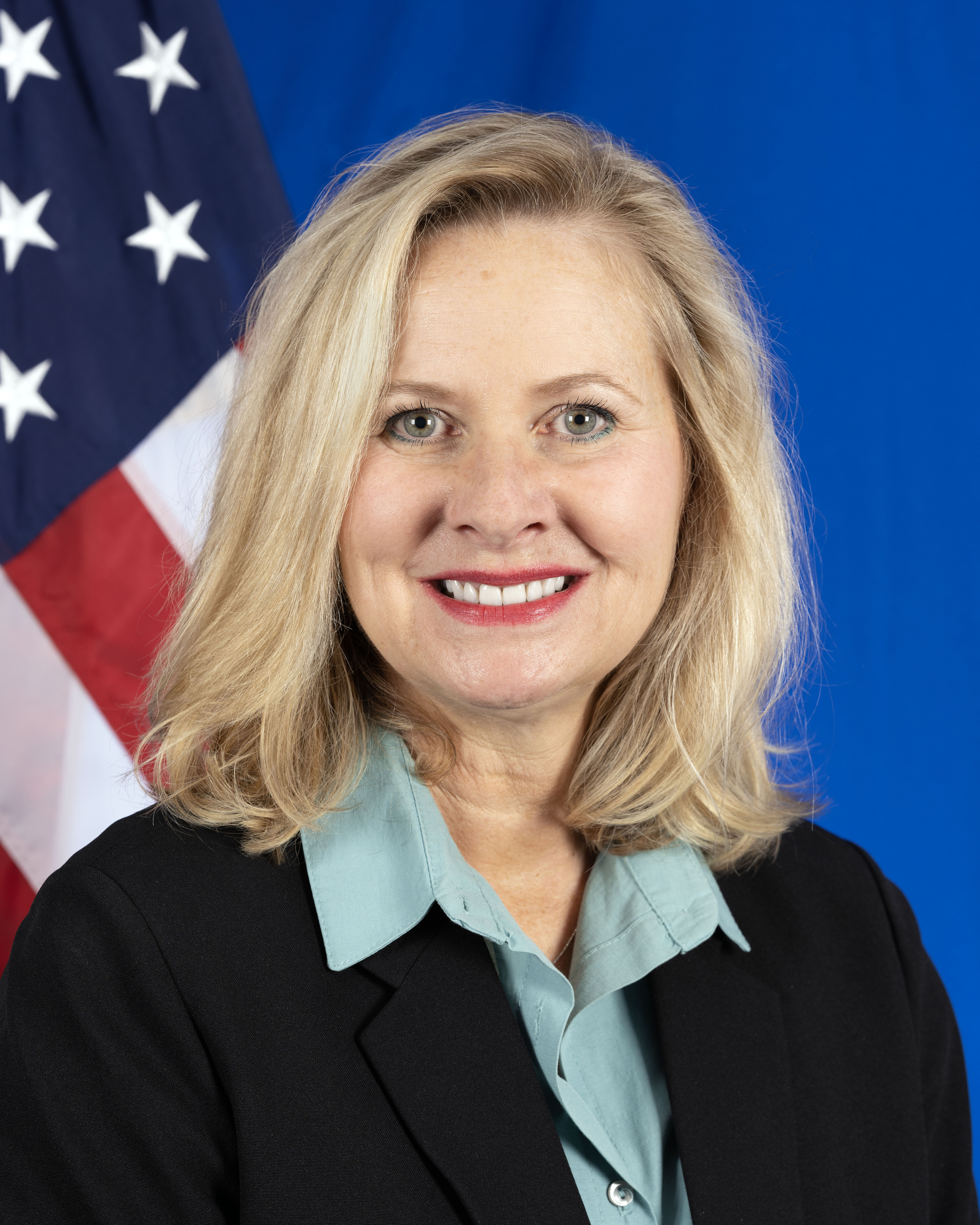
- Dyer in 2024

7th Ambassador-at-Large to Monitor and Combat Trafficking in Persons
- In office January 4, 2023 – January 20, 2025
- President: Joe Biden
- Preceded by: John Cotton Richmond
- Succeeded by: Barbera Thornhill

Director of the Office on Violence Against Women
- In office December 2007 – January 2009
- President: George W. Bush
- Preceded by: Mary Beth Buchanan
- Succeeded by: Catherine Pierce

Personal details
- Education: Texas A&M University (BA); Baylor University (JD)

Cynthia Dyer is an American attorney who served as the ambassador-at-large to monitor and combat trafficking in Persons from January 2023 to January 2025. She formerly served as director of the Office on Violence Against Women from 2007 to 2009.

== Education ==
Dyer graduated from Texas A&M University and Baylor University Law School.

== Career ==
Dyer has served as a former prosecutor with three decades of experience at the local, national, and international levels addressing domestic violence, sexual assault, gender-based violence (GBV), and human trafficking. Dyer has held roles in three different federal agencies, receiving broad, bi-partisan support across presidential administrations.

United States Department of State

On April 22, 2022, President Joe Biden nominated Dyer to serve as the Ambassador-at-Large to Monitor and Combat Trafficking in Persons, which leads the Office to Monitor and Combat Trafficking in Persons. Hearings on her nomination were held before the Senate Foreign Relations Committee on November 30, 2022, and the committee favorably reported her nomination on December 7, 2022. On December 20, 2022, the Senate confirmed Dyer's nomination and she began serving on January 4, 2023. While Ambassador, Dyer travelled to and directly engaged with government officials in 20 countries throughout every region in the world and oversaw a budget of over $300 million.

United States Department of Defense

In 2021, Dyer was appointed to serve on the Independent Review Commission on Sexual Assault in the Military (IRC) that was ordered by Secretary of Defense Lloyd J. Austin, III, at the direction of President Biden, to take bold action to address sexual assault and harassment in the military. Her appointment was extended to assist the Department of Defense with the implementation and oversight of the IRC recommendations.

Vital Voices Global Partnership

In early 2009, Dyer joined Vital Voices Global Partnership, a non-profit organization founded on the notion that nations and communities cannot move forward without women's voices in leadership positions and, to that end, invests in women leaders solving the world's greatest challenges. Dyer served as the Senior Director for Human Rights from February 2009 to February 2010 and as Vice President, Human Rights, from March 2010 to January 2021.

During her time leading the Human Rights team at Vital Voices, Dyer increased the annual Human Rights budget from $250,000 to $10 million and grew her division from 1 staff member to a staff of 20. In particular, she developed, implemented, and managed a multi-million dollar, public-private partnership to prevent and respond to gender-based violence around the world. Additionally, she worked with local governments and civil society leaders in more than 25 countries throughout Asia, Africa, Latin America, the Middle East, and Europe to assess, improve, and implement laws and policies to address violence, discrimination, and exploitation of women and other marginalized individuals and communities.

In January 2012, Dyer briefed U.S. Senate Staffers on the "Importance of Reauthorizing the Violence Against Women Act" In March 2018, she testified before the U.S. Senate in support of the Reauthorization of the Violence Against Women Act. On November 1, 2014, Dyer delivered a TEDxSMU talk in Dallas, Texas, entitled, “Addressing Violence Against Women Globally.” In 2019, Dyer was honored as "Fairygodboss of the Week".

United States Department of Justice

On August 2, 2007, President George W. Bush nominated Dyer to be Director of the Office on Violence Against Women, and the United States Senate confirmed her nomination on December 19, 2007. Dyer served as Director from December 2007 to January 2009. As Director, Dyer served as the liaison between the Department of Justice and Federal, State, global governments, and multi-lateral institutions, including the United Nations Office on Drugs and Crime (UNODC) on the crimes of domestic violence, sexual assault, dating violence, and stalking. In this role, Dyer was a member the U.S. Delegation to the UNODC's Commission on Crime Prevention and Criminal Justice. Dyer negotiated a draft decision regarding Violence Against Women and Girls, including the need to revise the "U.N. Model Strategies and Practical Measures on the Elimination of Violence against Women in the Field of Crime Prevention and Criminal Justice", and she served as the U.S. representative during Thematic Debate on Violence Against Women and Girls. Dyer was responsible for handling the department's legal and policy issues regarding the implementation of the Violence Against Women Act and oversaw an annual budget of almost $400 million.

Dallas County District Attorney's Office

Dyer began her legal career at the Dallas County, Texas, District Attorney's Office. She was the first prosecutor to join the Family Violence Division during its inception in 1994 and became the Chief Prosecutor of that division in 1998. She has received numerous awards and recognition for her service to victims, including the Henry Wade Prosecutor of the Year award from the Greater Dallas Crime Commission, the Equal Justice Award from the Legal Services of NorthWest Texas (n/k/a Legal Aid of NorthWest Texas), and the Stephen Von Riesen Lecturer of Merit Award from the National College of District Attorneys. Dyer became a leading practitioner of the “evidence-based prosecution” of domestic violence cases.

As an active member of her community in Dallas, Dyer served on the board of the Texas Council on Family Violence, assisted in proposing and drafting legislation to help victims of domestic violence and sexual assault, and volunteered for local organizations, including a non-profit women's shelter.
