= John Cotton Richmond =

American attorney & diplomat

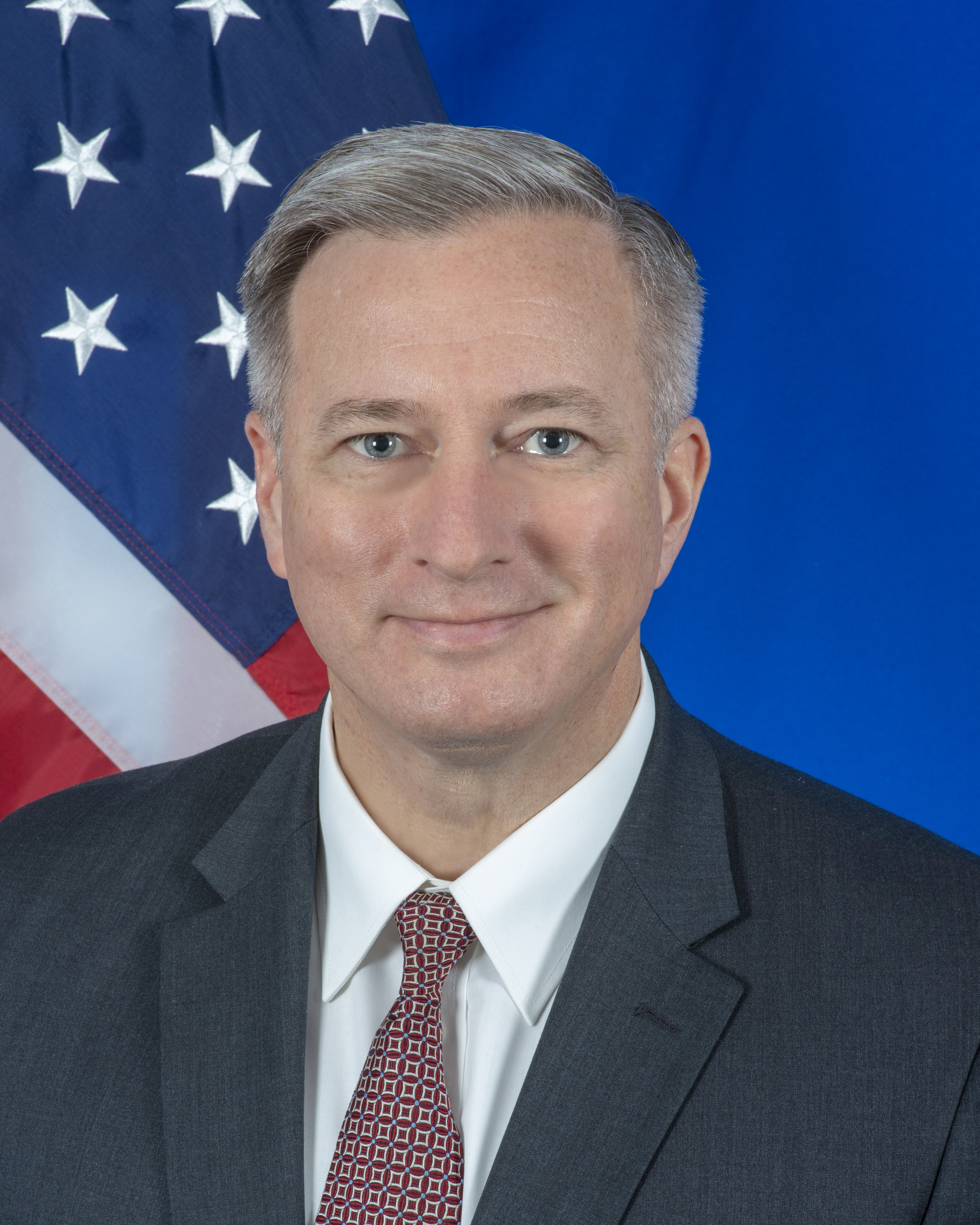

6th United States Ambassador-at-Large to Monitor and Combat Trafficking in Persons
- In office October 17, 2018 – January 20, 2021
- President: Donald Trump
- Preceded by: Susan P. Coppedge
- Succeeded by: Cindy Dyer

Personal details
- Born: Vicenza, Italy
- Spouse: Linda Marie
- Children: 3
- Education: University of Mary Washington; Wake Forest University (JD)

John Cotton Richmond is an American attorney and diplomat. From 2018 to 2021, Richmond served as the U.S. Ambassador-at-Large to Monitor and Combat Trafficking in Persons. He currently works as Chief Impact Officer at Atlas Free. He also serves as president of the Libertas Council, a leadership community focused on combating human trafficking, advancing democracy, and affirming human dignity.

== Early life and education ==
Ambassador Richmond was born in Vicenza, Italy while his father and mother were stationed at Aviano Air Base with the U.S. Air Force. The family returned to the United States when Richmond was three and he was raised in Yorktown, Virginia (with the exception of a four-year tour in Goldsboro, N.C.).

Richmond graduated from Tabb High School where he served as student body president and played varsity tennis. He earned his bachelor's degree from the University of Mary Washington in 1993 where he majored in geography and political science. Richmond was the President of the Student Senate.

In 1998, he earned his Juris Doctor from Wake Forest University School of Law. While in law school, Richmond served as an Articles Editor on the Law Review and Captain of the National Trial Team.

He also taught Human Trafficking Law, Policy, and Litigation at Pepperdine School of Law and Vanderbilt Law School.

== Professional and public service ==
=== Woods, Rogers (1998–2002) ===
After graduating from law school, Richmond joined the law firm of Woods, Rogers in Roanoke, Virginia. As an associate attorney his practice focused on commercial litigation, employment law, and adoption law.

=== International Justice Mission (2002–2006) ===
Richmond joined International Justice Mission and relocated to Chennai, India where he served as IJM's Field Office Director for South India. Richmond pioneered IJM's work to identify human trafficking victims, provide the victims protection services, and support the government as it held the traffickers accountable.

=== Federal civil rights prosecutor (2006–2016) ===
Richmond and his family moved back to the United States and Richmond was sworn in as a federal prosecutor with the U.S. Department of Justice's Civil Rights Division's Criminal Section. He was a founding member of the Department's Human Trafficking Prosecution Unit. Richmond prosecuted police misconduct, hate crimes, and labor and sex trafficking crimes.

Cotton led an investigation into a complaint about the trafficking of Indian workers to the United States by Signal International around 2006. In the course of the investigation, the workers were freed and given permission to remain in the United States, apply for permanent residency for themselves and immediate family. However, the investigation closed without criminal prosecution of either the company Signal International, its key executives, or the facilitators of the trafficking.

=== Human Trafficking Institute (2016–2018) ===
In 2016, Richmond co-founded the Human Trafficking Institute where he authored the first Federal Human Trafficking Report that provided an analysis of all criminal and civil federal forced labor and sex trafficking cases. Richmond also led efforts to build long-term capacity building in criminal justice systems to use a victim-centered and trauma informed approach to investigations and prosecutions.

=== U.S. Ambassador (2018–2021) ===
Richmond served as the U.S. Ambassador-at-Large to Monitor and Combat Trafficking in Persons from October 29, 2018 to January 20, 2021. This is the highest-ranking position in the U.S. government dedicated to human trafficking.

After he was unanimously confirmed by the U.S. Senate on October 29, 2018, Richmond advised the Secretary of State and the Under Secretary of State for Civilian Security, Democracy, and Human Rights on issues of human trafficking and he led U.S. foreign policy on this issue. As the head of the Office to Monitor and Combat Trafficking in Persons, he also has the rank of Assistant Secretary. In this role, he led U.S. foreign policy of issues of labor and sex trafficking and coordinated the federal interagency response to human trafficking in the United States.

=== Dentons (2021–2022) ===
In May 2021, Ambassador Richmond became a Partner at Dentons where his practice focused on the intersection between business and human rights. Richmond assisted businesses as they navigated the UK and Australia Modern Slavery Acts and the growing number of Mandatory Human Rights Due Diligence law in Europe. As disclosure and diligence requirements grow in the area of environment, social, and governance (ESG), Richmond assisted clients seeking to use the power of commerce to create positive change and improve value for shareholders and stakeholders.

=== Atlas Free (2023–present) ===
In February 2023, Atlas Free, a U.S.-based nonprofit organization, announced that Richmond had joined the organization as its Chief Impact Officer.

== Personal life ==
Richmond is married to Linda Marie Richmond and they have three children.

== Awards and recognition ==
Richmond's work to combat human trafficking caused the former head of the FBI's national human trafficking program to call Richmond, "every trafficker's worst nightmare." Richmond has also earned numerous honors, including: receiving the "Federal Prosecutors of the Year" by the Federal Law Enforcement Foundation, receiving the David Allred Award for Exceptional Contributions to Civil Rights, twice earning the Department of Homeland Security's Outstanding Investigative Accomplishments in a Human Trafficking Award, as well as twice receiving the Department of Justice's Special Commendation Award. He has also received Shared Hope International's Pathbreaker Award and Saving Innocence's Hero Award for his efforts. Richmond is also a fellow at the C.S. Lewis Institute.

== See also ==
- United States Ambassador-at-Large to Monitor and Combat Trafficking in Persons
- Under Secretary of State for Civilian Security, Democracy, and Human Rights
- Office to Monitor and Combat Trafficking in Persons
