= Jamie Harpootlian =

American lawyer and diplomat (born 1959)

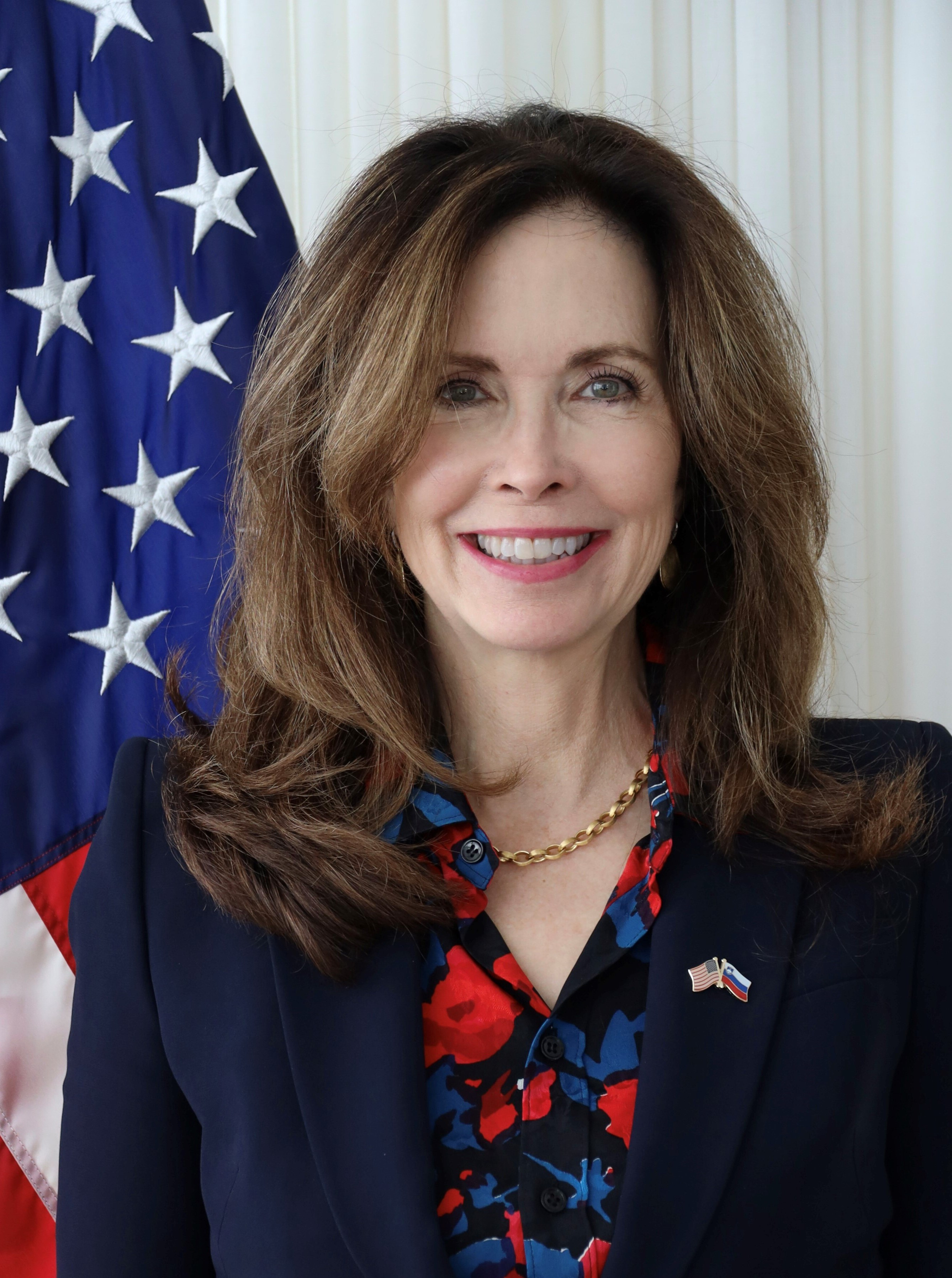

10th United States Ambassador to Slovenia
- In office February 17, 2022 – July 31, 2024
- President: Joe Biden
- Preceded by: Lynda Blanchard
- Succeeded by: Asel Roberts

Personal details
- Born: Jamie Lindler Coronado, California, U.S.
- Party: Democratic
- Spouse: Dick Harpootlian (m. 2007)
- Education: Mary Baldwin University (BA); Tulane University (JD)
- Awards: Medal for International Cooperation, First Class awarded by the Ministry of Defense of the Republic of Slovenia

Jamie Lindler Harpootlian (born September 7, 1959) is an American lawyer and diplomat who served as the 10th United States Ambassador to the Republic of Slovenia under President Joe Biden's administration.

== Early life and education ==
Harpootlian was born in California to Cmdr. Charles R. Lindler and his wife, Margaret. Her father was a naval aviator who served in WWII, the Korean War, and the Vietnam War. Harpootlian lived her early life along coastal California and in the Philippines. Upon her father's retirement, the family moved to South Carolina to live near relatives, and her father started a new career in the hotel business.

Harpootlian's military family moved frequently. She attended six different schools in 12 years, ultimately graduating from public high school in Columbia, South Carolina. In 1981, she graduated from Mary Baldwin College (now Mary Baldwin University) in Staunton, Virginia where she earned a B.A. in Political Science and Art History with distinction, and was elected to Phi Beta Kappa. While at Mary Baldwin, Harpootlian spent two semesters in foreign study at University College, Oxford University, and at the American University in Paris. Harpootlian received her J.D. from Tulane University Law School in New Orleans, Louisiana in 1984.

== Legal career ==
Harpootlian has spent much of her career as a lawyer in public service. She began her legal career working for the US Courts with United States District Judge Henry A. Mentz, Jr., in the Eastern District of Louisiana in New Orleans. She provided legal advice to the court in hundreds of cases involving a wide variety of facts and issues, including several mass tort class actions. Subsequently, she served by judicial appointments as a special master on a variety of state and federal mass toxic tort cases to evaluate damages, mediate settlements, resolve fee disputes, and distribute allocations. The US Department of Justice, Civil Division appointed Harpootlian to serve as a hearing officer on the 9/11 Victim Compensation Fund, holding hearings to assess eligibility and compensation for survivors. Harpootlian most recently worked as of counsel to the law firm of Richard A. Harpootlian, P.A. Harpootlian is admitted to practice before the United States Supreme Court, the US District Court for the Eastern District of Louisiana, and all Louisiana Courts.

== Ambassadorship ==
On July 21, 2021, President Joe Biden announced his intent to nominate Harpootlian to serve as Ambassador to the Republic of Slovenia, and on August 4, 2021, her nomination was received by the Senate from the President. The Senate Foreign Relations Committee favorably reported her nomination to the Senate floor on December 15, 2021. The Senate confirmed her nomination by voice vote on December 18, 2021, and President Biden appointed her to serve as Ambassador to the Republic of Slovenia on December 20, 2021. After being sworn in on December 30, 2021, she presented her credentials to the President of Slovenia Borut Pahor in a formal ceremony at the Presidential Palace in Ljubljana on February 17, 2022.

=== Ukraine, NATO, and security ===
Commencing her work as ambassador in Slovenia one week before the 2022 invasion of Ukraine, Harpootlian focused her efforts on strengthening bi-lateral defense and security cooperation with Slovenia, supporting its donations of critical military equipment, infrastructure repair, and humanitarian aid to Ukraine, and encouraging Slovenia’s support for NATO. In an interview after two years of war with Russia, Harpootlian assured Slovenia that America's support for Ukraine is firm, and that "If Putin wins he is not going to stop at the borders of Ukraine."

Harpootlian oversaw Slovenia's single-largest Foreign Military Sales case to date of US-made military equipment for the Slovenian Armed Forces.

She welcomed a multinational exercise in Slovenia with 16,000 US and NATO service personnel from 30 NATO and partner nations conducting the single largest military training exercise in the Slovenian Armed Forces history. Harpootlian led key members of the Slovenian government and military on two Distinguished Visitor embarks to US aircraft carriers the USS Harry S. Truman (CVN 75) and the USS Gerald R. Ford (CVN 78), and a port visit to the guided missile cruiser USS Leyte Gulf.

Harpootlian advocated for the expansion of the Port of Koper for its strategic importance to the US. During her tenure, she received the most US ship visits ever to the Port of Koper, as well as three major Reception, Staging, and Onward Movement (RSOM) operations for US forces.

Harpootlian engaged in robust partnership with Slovenia about strategies to promote stability and combat anti-democratic manipulation in the Western Balkans. She initiated and hosted the executive-level seminar Issues and Ways Forward in the Western Balkans led by George C. Marshall Center experts. She also participated in the handover of Slovenia’s state-of-the-art Cyber Training Center built in partnership with the US. The Cyber Training Center bolsters Slovenia’s security capabilities and serves as a training center for Western Balkan and NATO partner countries to defend against malicious actors. Harpootlian praised the US $30 million donation to this effort to expand Slovenia’s role in regional and global cyber security leadership. In 2024, Harpootlian joined the signing ceremony for the US and Slovenia Memorandum of Understanding (MOU) on Countering Foreign State Information Manipulation to continue their partnership to combat disinformation.

On May 29, 2024, the Ministry of Defense awarded Harpootlian the Medal for International Cooperation, First Class for her personal contribution to the development and reputation of the Ministry of Defense and the Slovenian Armed Forces.

=== Economic cooperation ===
Harpootlian focused the US-Slovenian economic partnership on Slovenia’s emerging technology, space industry, healthcare and start-up companies. Persistent outreach in support of trusted 5G telecommunications contributed to Slovenia's strong telecom regulations. A Direct Line webinar Harpootlian hosted with the Department of State attracted over 80 US participants to discuss Slovenia's high-tech sector and fast-growing start-up companies.

Harpootlian joined Prime Minister Golob in September 2022 for the two-year anniversary of the launch of Slovenia's first two satellites designed to collect data to develop resilience to climate change.

Harpootlian urged Slovenia to join NASA’s Artemis Accords to advance responsible space exploration, and in April 2024, Harpootlian, astronaut Randy Bresnik, and others participated in Slovenia’s signing ceremony. On the same date, Harpootlian announced the Department of State’s selection of Slovenia to participate in Project Phoenix supporting clean energy transition.

In 2022, Harpootlian and the Slovenian Minister of Education signed an MOU supporting the Fulbright Exchange Program by adopting its framework and removing the sunset clause.

Harpootlian also participated in economic-focused panel discussions at the Bled Strategic Forum, including "ESG: An Imperative or Just Another Buzzword? The Role of Business in Today's World" and "The Role of Emerging Technologies and Transatlantic Partnerships for EU Competitiveness and Economic Growth.

=== Political and cultural diplomacy ===
Harpootlian viewed in-person meetings as a particularly important and successful part of diplomacy. During her tenure, she supported several US-Slovenian high-level meetings, and hosted a 10-member, bi-partisan US congressional delegation in Slovenia.

She valued cultural diplomacy as an engaging way to share democratic values with the Slovenian people. To that end, she made it a point to participate in Slovenia’s culture, its schools, museums, libraries, artistic events, and sporting events. At her request, the Department of State brought its Art in Embassies program to Slovenia to share the work of American artists. Harpootlian’s collection curated nature-focused art from her home state of South Carolina. She participated in opening several art exhibitions, for both European and American artists. She met with religious leaders regularly, visited numerous libraries and museums and traveled annually to WWII crash sites along with the President of Slovenia and US military leaders, to honor the downed US airmen and the Slovenian people who rendered aid.

== Awards and recognitions ==
On May 29, 2024, the Ministry of Defense awarded Harpootlian the Medal for International Cooperation, First Class for her personal contribution to the development and reputation of the Ministry of Defense and the Slovenian Armed Forces. In 2023, the US Department of State and the US Department of Commerce jointly awarded Embassy Ljubljana the prestigious Benjamin Joy award in recognition of the Embassy’s outstanding interagency collaboration to level the playing field for US healthcare equipment manufacturers in Slovenia. The Embassy successfully encouraged the Slovenian Ministry of Health to audit public procurement practices that successfully advanced the US economic objectives.

== Personal life ==
Harpootlian is married to Dick Harpootlian, a lawyer, author, and former state senator. Dick served as the chair of the South Carolina Democratic Party, and most recently served as a member of the South Carolina Senate from 2018 to 2024.

Diplomatic posts
Preceded by Lynda Blanchard	United States Ambassador to Slovenia; 2022–2024	Succeeded by Asel Roberts
