= Gary L. Wilson =

American business executive

Gary L. Wilson is an American business executive. He served as chairman of the board of Northwest Airlines, chief financial officer of Walt Disney Company and chief financial officer of Marriott Corporation.

== Early life ==
Wilson was born and raised in Alliance, Ohio. He graduated from Alliance High School 1958. Wilson attended Duke University where he played football. Wilson was a running back on the Duke team that won the Cotton Bowl in 1960. Wilson earned a bachelor's degree from Duke in 1962, and an MBA from the Wharton School of Finance and Commerce at the University of Pennsylvania in 1963. He received an Honorary Doctor of Laws degree from Pepperdine University in 2005.

His eldest son Derek Wilson earned a Bachelor of Arts degree in economics from Duke in 1986 and an MBA from The Fuqua School of Business in 1990. Derek's mother, Susan Moody Wilson, graduated from Duke in 1962. Derek's daughter, Trinity, is a 2015 Duke graduate.

== Career ==
Wilson began his career in 1964 in Manila as CFO of Trans-Philippines Investment Corp. (TPIC), a leveraged buyout of one of the world's largest sugar companies. He created and was CEO of a sugar-trading subsidiary that produced 20 percent of TPIC's profit with no capital invested. He recommended and implemented the transformation of the firm from a sugar company to one of Asia's largest construction companies by acquiring Atlantic Gulf & Pacific (AG&P) in 1969, while selling the sugar mills.

After returning from Asia, he joined Marriott in 1974, as executive vice president for finance, strategy and development. While there, Marriott's market capitalization increased from $200 million in 1974 to $3.6 billion in 1987 for a 24 percent IRR. Among his accomplishments were creating and developing the Courtyard Hotel concept, as well as Marriott time sharing. He led the 1978 repurchase of one-third of Marriott shares, which at the time was the second largest stock buyback in history.

In 1985, Wilson joined the Walt Disney Company as executive vice president of finance, strategy and development when the Bass Brothers acquired control. During his tenure there, market capitalization increased from $2 billion to $20 billion, an IRR of 58 percent, primarily by expanding hotel and theme park assets while increasing prices. Among his accomplishments were increasing hotel rooms from 4,000 in 1985 to 18,000 rooms in 1992 and introducing time-sharing based on the Marriott model. He developed the Euro Disney theme park complex in Paris from site selection to financing, gaining major concessions from the French government and culminating in one of Europe's largest IPOs. He financed films through innovative public partnerships that shifted ownership risk to investors while Disney retained distribution fees and a share of appreciation.

Wilson led the buyout of Northwest Airlines in 1989. With partner KLM, Northwest Airlines created code-sharing which allowed passengers to fly on several airlines on a single ticket thus creating airline alliances that now permeate the industry. SkyTeam, Oneworld and Star Alliance now cover the world. In 1997, Northwest acquired control of Continental Airlines. In 2004 as a director of KLM, he helped negotiate their merger with Air France. Prior to the September 11 attacks and the subsequent fallout on the airline industry, Northwest's market capitalization reached $6 billion, providing investors with handsome returns on their $300 million initial equity investment. He served as chairman or co-chairman of Northwest from 1991 to 2007.

Wilson successfully acquired other companies, including Progress Rail in 2004, and is the creator and general partner of several private equity funds: Manhattan Pacific Partners, an investment fund; Thayer Lodging, a hotel investor; and KAILAI Investments, which invests in Chinese companies.

Wilson's group acquired Coldwell Banker's commercial real estate company in 1992, which through many acquisitions became CBRE Group, Inc., the world's largest real estate firm. He served on the CBRE board until 2016.

“Leadership and management are a business’s most important asset. They are not on the balance sheet, but they can quickly produce results. Be aggressive about who you work for and hire people better than you are.” — Gary L. Wilson during a speech in 2005 at the University of Southern California.

== Boards ==
Wilson is chairman of the Board of TruthMD.

He is trustee emeritus of Duke University and serves on the board of overseers of the Keck School of Medicine at the University of Southern California.

He previously served on the boards of directors of Northwest Airlines, Inc., The Walt Disney Company and Yahoo! Inc.

== Philanthropy ==
In 1990 Gary established The Wilson Foundation. Its objective is helping the disadvantaged with a focus on education and criminal justice reform. The Wilson Foundation partnered with the Koch family to establish the Wilson Center for Science and Justice at Duke Law. The Foundation is the prime sponsor of Strive, a school for the underprivileged in the Watts area of Los Angeles.

Gary established the Elvin J. Wilson-Duke University Scholarship in memory of his late father. It is awarded annually to an Alliance High School student enrolling at Duke University. Duke pays half of the scholarship, with Wilson contributing the other half. The program has 14 graduates. Wilson has contributed over $10 million to Duke University.

== Personal ==
Gary has three sons, Derek, Christopher, and Hale, and five grandchildren, Tate, Truman, Trinity, Lily, and Christoper. He is married to Jane Booke, a fashion designer. They live in Los Angeles.
