= List of ambassadors of the United States to Slovenia =

Ambassador of the United States to Slovenia
- Seal of the United States Department of State

- Flag of a United States ambassador

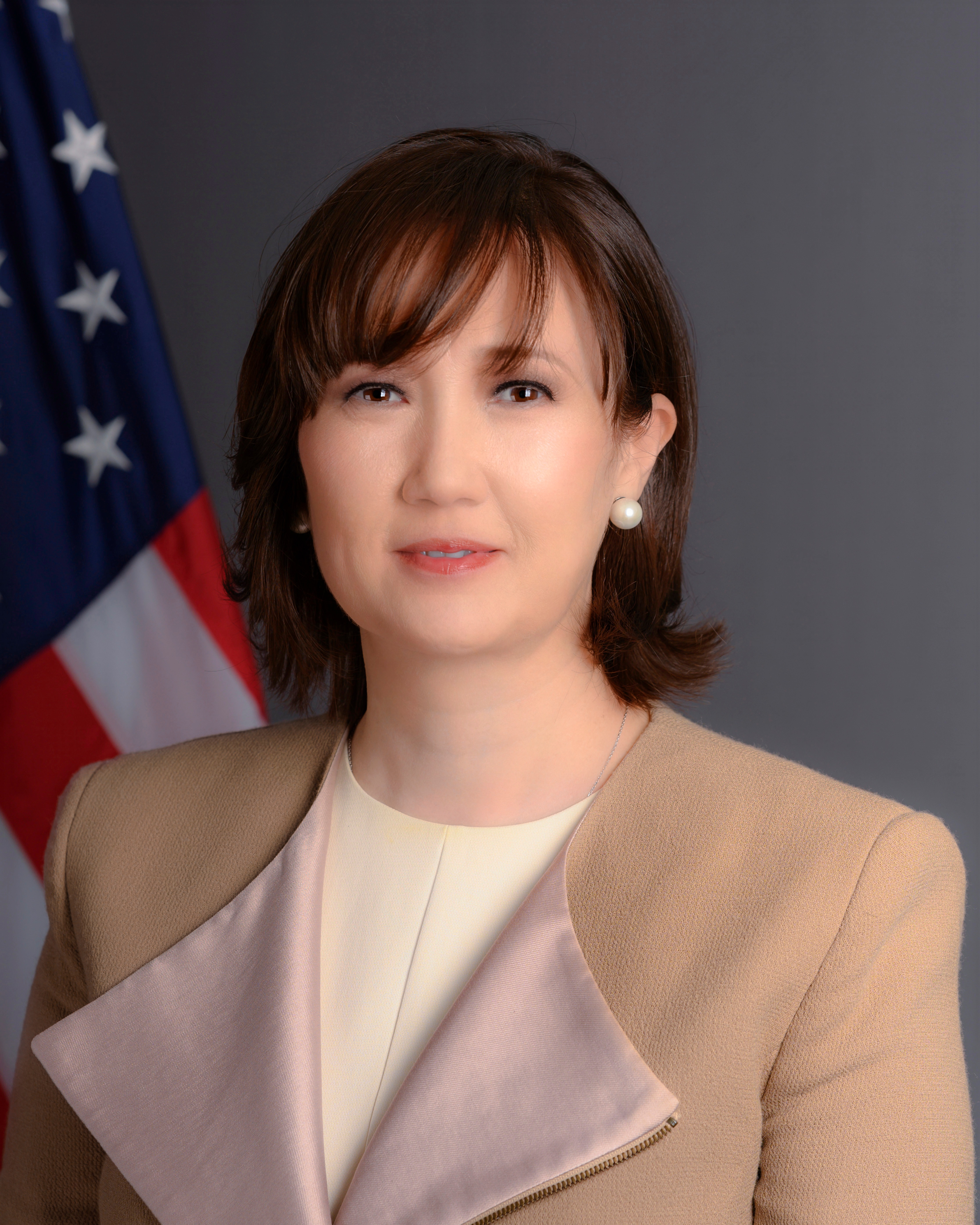
- Incumbent; Asel Roberts since June 15, 2026
- Nominator: The president of the United States
- Inaugural holder: E. Allan Wendt as Ambassador Extraordinary and Plenipotentiary
- Formation: August 1992
- Website: U.S. Embassy - Ljubljana

The diplomatic post of United States Ambassador to Slovenia was created after the disbanding of Yugoslavia and the United States recognizing the new nation of Slovenia on April 7, 1992. In August of that year, the American Embassy in Ljubljana opened with E. Allan Wendt as chargé d'affaires ad interim. He officially took over as ambassador in 1993.

== Ambassadors ==
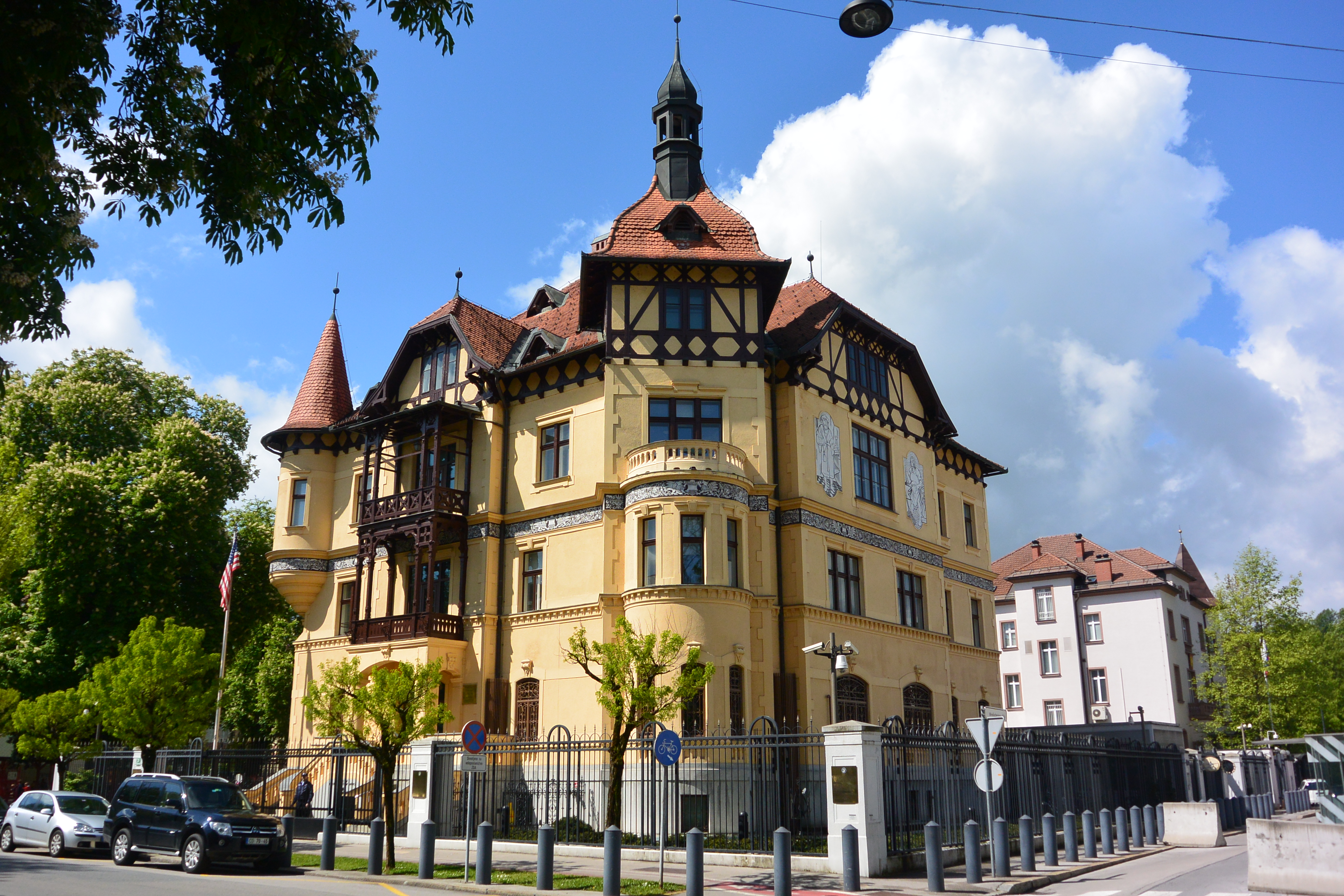
U.S. embassy in Ljubljana

- E. Allan Wendt
  - Appointed: May 26, 1993
  - Terminated mission: September 12, 1995
- Victor Jackovich
  - Appointed: September 14, 1995
  - Terminated mission: February 13, 1998
- Nancy Halliday Ely-Raphel
  - Appointed: September 2, 1998
  - Terminated mission: September 27, 2001
- Johnny Young
  - Appointed: October 24, 2001
  - Terminated mission: September 17, 2004
- Thomas Bolling Robertson
  - Appointed: September 29, 2004
  - Terminated mission: August 20, 2007
- Yousif Ghafari
  - Appointed: May 29, 2008
  - Terminated mission: January 20, 2009
- Joseph A. Mussomeli
  - Appointed: October 29, 2010
  - Terminated mission: January 31, 2015
- Brent R. Hartley
  - Appointed: February 12, 2015
  - Terminated mission: July 16, 2018
- Lynda C. Blanchard
  - Appointed: August 29, 2019
  - Terminated mission: January 20, 2021
- Susan K. Falatko (Chargé d'Affaires)
  - Appointed: January 20, 2021
  - Terminated mission: February 17, 2022
- Jamie Harpootlian
  - Appointed: February 17, 2022
  - Terminated mission: July 31, 2024
- Melania Arreaga (Chargé d'Affaires)
  - Appointed: July 31, 2024
  - Terminated mission: August 1, 2025
- Brian Greaney (Chargé d'Affaires)
  - Appointed: August 28, 2025
  - Terminated mission: June 11, 2026
- Asel Roberts
  - Appointed: June 15, 2026
  - Terminated mission: Incumbent

== See also ==
- Slovenia – United States relations
- Foreign relations of Slovenia
- Ambassadors of the United States
