= Susan P. Coppedge =

American attorney and diplomat

Susan Coppedge
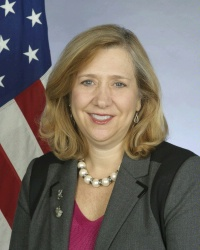

5th United States Ambassador-at-Large to Monitor and Combat Trafficking in Persons
- In office October 19, 2015 – July 21, 2017
- President: Barack Obama; Donald Trump
- Preceded by: Luis CdeBaca
- Succeeded by: John Cotton Richmond

Personal details
- Born: 1966 Dalton, Georgia, U.S.
- Education: Duke University; Stanford University

Susan Patricia Coppedge is an American attorney and diplomat, who previously served as United States Ambassador-at-Large to Monitor and Combat Trafficking in Persons. She was nominated by President Barack Obama and confirmed by the Senate October 8, 2015. In this role, she advised the United States Secretary of State and the Under Secretary of State for Civilian Security, Democracy, and Human Rights directly and formulates U.S. policy on human trafficking. As the head of the Office to Monitor and Combat Trafficking in Persons, she also held the rank of Assistant Secretary.

== Early life and education ==
Coppedge grew up in Dalton, Georgia, the daughter of Patricia Ann Martin Coppedge and Warren Coppedge Jr., who once served as a deputy assistant Attorney General for the state of Georgia. Coppedge graduated from Dalton High School and earned a BA in public policy studies from Duke University in 1988. She earned her JD in 1993 from Stanford Law School.

== Career ==
After she graduated from law school, Coppedge clerked for U.S. District Judge William Clark O'Kelley, who served on the United States District Court for the Northern District of Georgia.

In 1995 Coppedge joined the United States Department of Justice through the Honors Program as a trial attorney in the Environmental Enforcement Section. She then joined the office of the U.S. Attorney for the United States District Court for the Northern District of Georgia, initially as a special assistant U.S. Attorney and then as an Assistant U.S. Attorney.

She was awarded a Fulbright-Ian Axford Fellowship in Public Policy in 2006. With the fellowship, she was able to spend six months with New Zealand's Ministry of Justice studying and evaluating the country's human trafficking laws and prosecutions. Coppedge continued her focus on prosecuting human trafficking cases.

In October 2022, Coppedge joined the Council for Responsible Social Media project launched by Issue One to address the negative mental, civic, and public health impacts of social media in the United States co-chaired by former House Democratic Caucus Leader Dick Gephardt and former Massachusetts Lieutenant Governor Kerry Healey.

Coppedge serves as executive director of the Georgia Legal Services Program.

== Personal ==
Coppedge is married to Lorenzo Amato and they have two children.

Diplomatic posts
Preceded by Kari Johnstone; Acting	United States Ambassador-at-Large to Monitor and Combat Trafficking in Persons; 2015–2017	Succeeded by John Cotton Richmond
