= Asel Roberts =

American diplomat (born 1976)

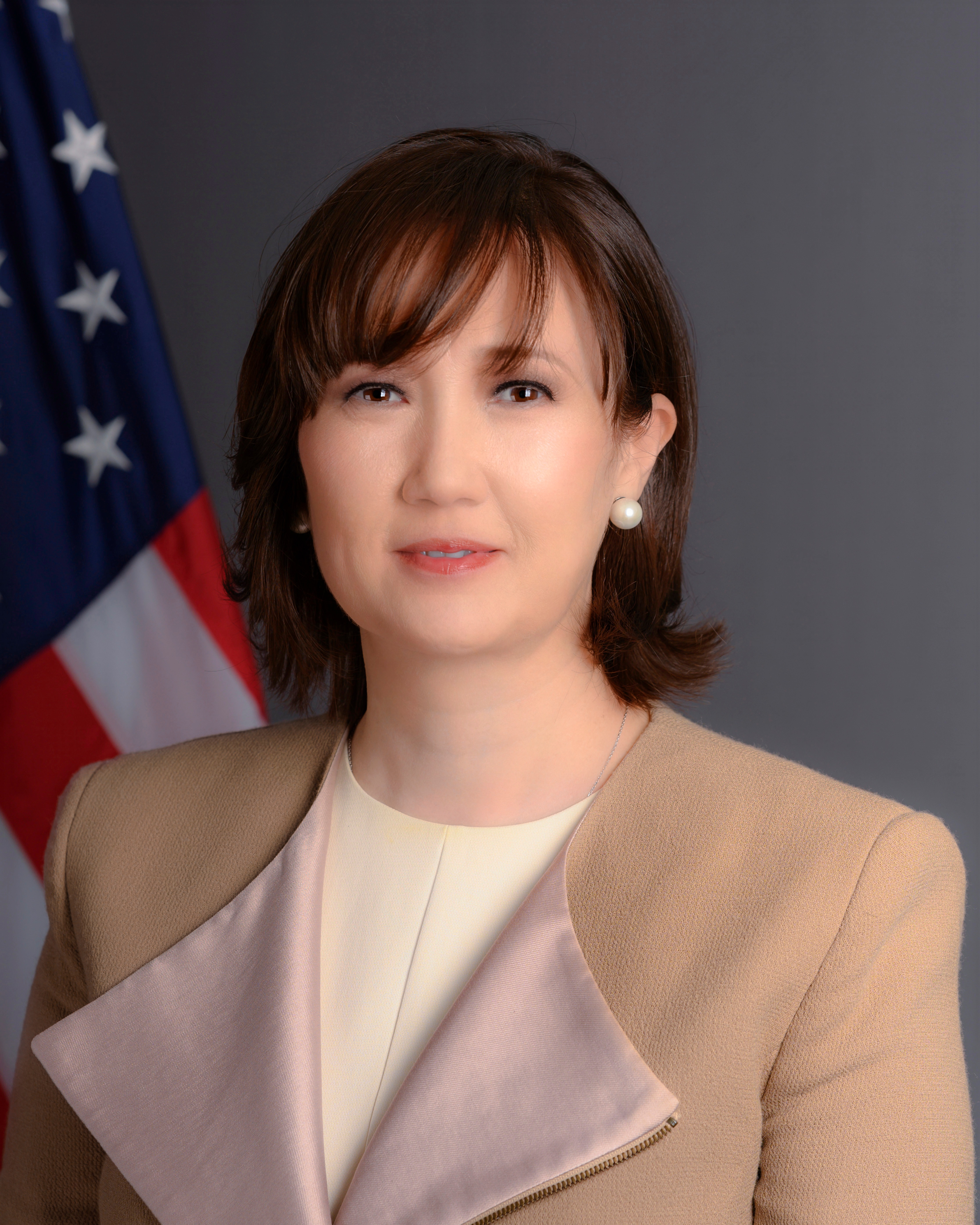
- Official portrait, 2026

United States Ambassador to Slovenia
- Incumbent
- Assumed office June 15, 2026
- President: Donald Trump
- Preceded by: Jamie Harpootlian

Acting Chief of Protocol of the United States
- In office January 20, 2021 – January 3, 2022
- President: Joe Biden
- Preceded by: Cam Henderson
- Succeeded by: Rufus Gifford

Personal details
- Born: Asel Tolenova; 1976 (age 49–50) Almaty, Kazakh SSR, Soviet Union
- Education: Georgetown University (BS)

Asel Roberts (née Tolenova; Kazakh: Әсел Робертс; born 1976) is a Kazakh-born American diplomat who is serving United States Ambassador to Slovenia. She had served as Acting Chief of Protocol of the United States from January 20, 2021 to January 3, 2022.

== Early life ==
Roberts was born in Almaty, Kazakh SSR, USSR in 1976. She graduated from Georgetown University's Walsh School of Foreign Service with a Bachelor of Science degree in International Law and Organizations. In addition to English, she also speaks Russian, Kazakh, and Japanese.

== Career ==
Roberts had more than 15 years of experience in the Office of the Chief of Protocol and was serving as a senior advisor when she became the acting chief of protocol in Joe Biden's administration.

In February 2026, President Donald Trump nominated Roberts to be Ambassador Extraordinary and Plenipotentiary of the United States to the Republic of Slovenia. She presented her credentials to President Nataša Pirc Musar on June 15, 2026.

Political offices
Preceded by Cam Henderson	Chief of Protocol of the United States; Acting; 2021	Succeeded by Rufus Gifford
