= Barbera Thornhill =

American politician

- Official portrait, 2026

8th Ambassador-at-Large to Monitor and Combat Trafficking in Persons
- Incumbent
- Assumed office October 13, 2026
- President: Donald Trump
- Preceded by: Cindy Dyer

Personal details
- Born: 1947 or 1948 (age 78–79)
- Party: Republican

Barbera Hale Thornhill is an American businesswoman and diplomat who has served as United States Ambassador-at-Large to Monitor and Combat Trafficking in Persons since October 2026. In October 2026, Thornhill was memed online for her appearance.

== Early life and education ==
Thornhill grew up in North Carolina. She attended St. Mary’s School, the University of California, Los Angeles, George Washington University, and North Carolina State University.

== Career ==
Prior to holding office, Thornhill was the president of Impact Design, an interior design firm based in Los Angeles.

On September 19, 2019, President Donald Trump nominated Thornhill to serve as United States ambassador to Singapore. Thornhill's nomination was withdrawn in 2021 following Trump's departure from office.

In October 2026, Thornhill became the eighth United States Ambassador-at-Large to Monitor and Combat Trafficking in Persons, succeeding Cindy Dyer. Shortly after she assumed office, some people criticized her appearance on social media.

== Personal life ==
Thornhill was formerly married to Gary L. Wilson. In 1997 they donated $5 million to Duke University to help build a new recreation center for students.

She was a board member of the National Museum of Women in the Arts in 1988.
