= Nick Oberheiden =

German-American lawyer (born 1980)

United States Ambassador to Egypt
- Nominee
- Assumed office TBD
- Nominated by: Donald Trump
- Preceded by: Herro Mustafa

Personal details
- Born: 1980 (age 45–46) Oberhausen, West Germany
- Citizenship: Germany; United States
- Education: University of Hamburg (Dr. iur.); UCLA School of Law (JD)
- Occupation: Lawyer

Nick Oberheiden is a German-American attorney and the nominee for U.S. ambassador to Egypt. He is also the founding partner of Oberheiden P.C.

== Early life and education ==
Nick Oberheiden was born in Oberhausen, Germany. During his early life, Oberheiden trained with the swimming club SG Essen, became a member of the National Junior Team, and later placed second at the German swimming championships in 1994.

Oberheiden studied law at Ruhr University from 1998 to 2000 and later attended the University of Hamburg, where he earned a doctorate in law (Dr. iur.). He also earned a Juris Doctor from UCLA School of Law and received the Morris Greenspan Memorial Prize for Excellence in International Law. At UCLA, he spent three years as a research fellow to Professor Máximo Langer, focusing on international criminal law. He also worked briefly in the Office of the Prosecutor at the International Criminal Tribunal for the former Yugoslavia in The Hague.

== Career ==
After graduating from UCLA, Oberheiden began his legal career at a New York City law firm. He later founded his own legal firm, Oberheiden P.C. in Dallas.

In 2022, Oberheiden secured the dismissal of all 154 federal counts against a physician accused of distributing controlled substances in the United States v. Dr. Donald Hyungjoon Kim. He also represented the defendant in United States v. Jack Hsu, a federal bank fraud case involving a fugitive who was returned to the United States in 2022 after three decades abroad, and the defendant in United States v. Thelma Marshell Anderson, a Dallas prosecution involving Paycheck Protection Program fraud. Oberheiden also represented several individuals who faced criminal charges for their involvement in the January 6 attack on the U.S. Capitol.

In 2023, former Secretary of State Mike Pompeo, former Director of National Intelligence John Ratcliffe, and former Congressman Trey Gowdy joined Oberheiden P.C. as advisers.

By 2026, Oberheiden had donated more than $1 million to political committees that support Donald Trump. On June 1, 2026, the Senate received Oberheiden's nomination to serve as U.S. Ambassador to Egypt, a role that has traditionally required extensive diplomatic experience. As of September 2026, Oberheiden was Lori Chavez-DeRemer's personal attorney following accusations of her misuse of taxpayer funds as U.S. Secretary of Labor.

== Selected publications ==
- The Law of Tomorrow (2022), co-authored with Alina Veneziano and Paul Strickland
- Elegant Simplicity, a German legal series for international lawyers studying U.S. law
- An Introduction to the Practice of Civil Litigation in the USA (Portuguese)
