= Benjamin Landa =

American businessman

United States Ambassador to Hungary
- Nominee
- Assuming office TBD
- President: Donald Trump
- Succeeding: David Pressman

Personal details
- Born: Benjamin Landa

Benjamin Landa is an American businessman and the current nominee to be U.S. Ambassador to Hungary.

== Early life and education ==
Landa's family lived in New Jersey and Brooklyn, New York during his youth; his parents immigrated to the United States. Landa earned his bachelor's degree in 1979 from Adelphi University.

== Career ==
Landa is the co-founder of SentosaCare LLC, a management company focused on elder living facilities and the long-term care industry; he founded the group in 2003 and became the Chief Executive Officer. The company owns more than 100 nursing facilities across the United States.

Landa was previously a landowner of Cold Spring Hills Center for Nursing and Rehabilitation in Woodbury, New York. In November 2025, the Department of Health and Human Services published an audit of Pinnacle Multicare Nursing and Rehabilitation Center, which Landa co-owns, finding that Pinnacle failed to comply with Medicare requirements and recommending a $31.2 million repayment to the Medicare program for improper billing.

In September 2025, Landa met with President Donald Trump to reportedly express his interest in serving as an ambassador. In October 2025, Trump nominated Landa to serve as U.S. Ambassador to Hungary. Landa is listed as a donor of $5 million in the Wall Street Journal's overview of big donors to Trump-friendly MAGA, Inc..
