= Lynda Blanchard =

American businesswoman and diplomat (born 1959)

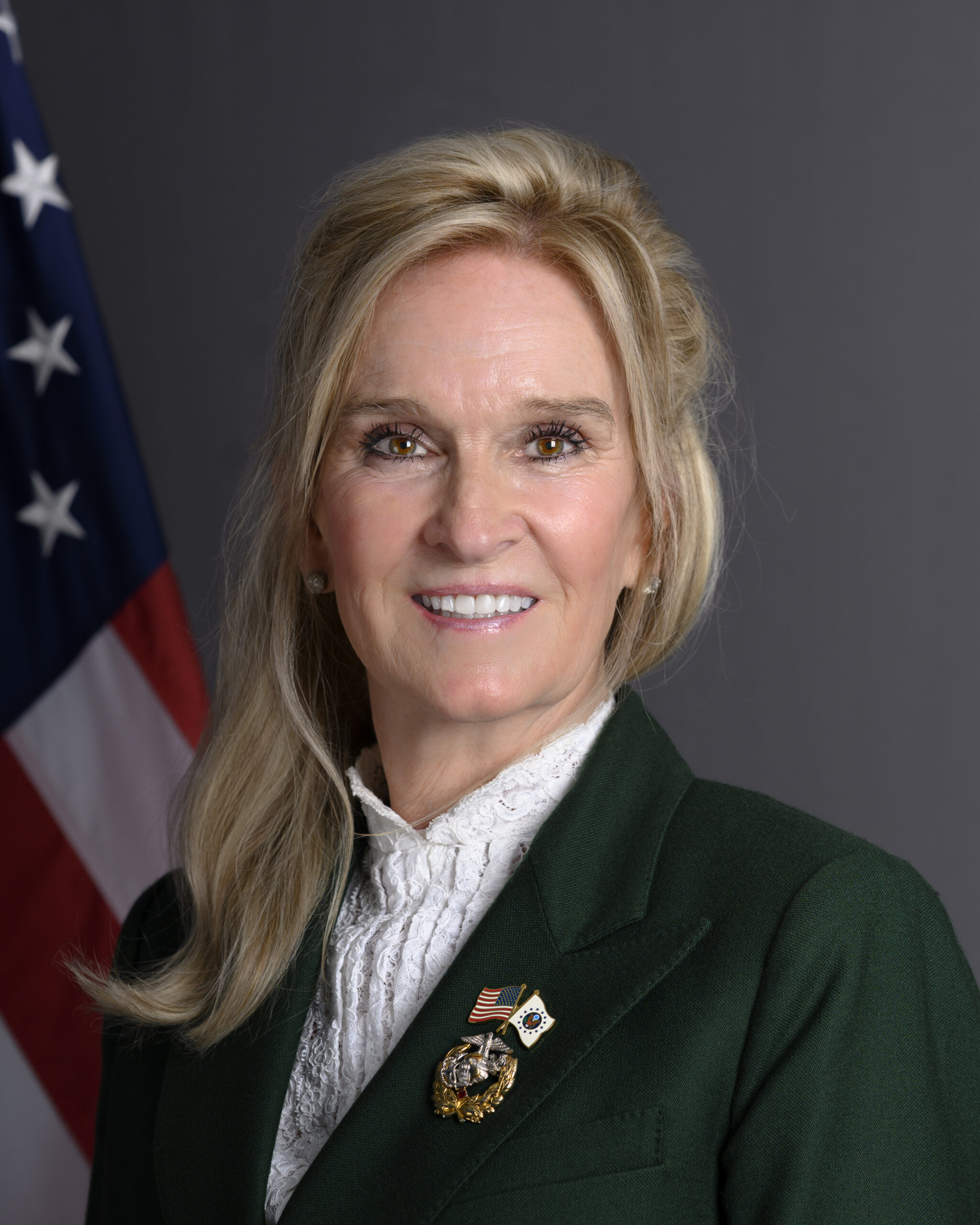
- Official portrait, 2025

United States Ambassador to the United Nations Agencies for Food and Agriculture
- Incumbent
- Assumed office November 10, 2025
- President: Donald Trump
- Preceded by: Jeffrey Prescott

United States Ambassador to Slovenia
- In office August 29, 2019 – January 20, 2021
- President: Donald Trump
- Preceded by: Brent Hartley
- Succeeded by: Jamie Harpootlian

Personal details
- Born: July 4, 1959 (age 67) Montgomery, Alabama, U.S.
- Party: Republican
- Spouse: John Blanchard
- Children: 7
- Education: Auburn University (BS)

Lynda Blanchard (born July 4, 1959) is an American businesswoman and diplomat who has served as United States Ambassador to the United Nations Agencies for Food and Agriculture since 2025 under President Donald Trump. She previously served in the First Trump administration as United States Ambassador to Slovenia from 2019 until 2021.

In February 2021, Blanchard announced her candidacy for the 2022 United States Senate election in Alabama to replace the retiring senator Richard Shelby. Blanchard's most significant opponent was Representative Mo Brooks, who had been endorsed by Trump. In November 2021, The Wall Street Journal reported that Trump was considering endorsing Blanchard if she withdrew her Senate campaign and ran for governor instead. Blanchard officially switched races on December 7, 2021, announcing that she would instead run in the 2022 Alabama gubernatorial election instead of the Senate race. In the May 24 primary, Blanchard finished in second place in the gubernatorial race, with 19% of the vote, losing to incumbent governor Kay Ivey.

== Early life and education ==
Blanchard is a native of Montgomery, Alabama. She earned a Bachelor of Science degree in mathematics, with a minor in computer science, from Auburn University in 1991.

== Business career ==
Blanchard is the founder and former senior advisor of B&M Management Company, a real estate investment firm.

In 2004, Blanchard founded the 100X Development Foundation, a non-profit organization based in Montgomery, Alabama dedicated to eradicating poverty and improving the lives of children worldwide through education, anti-hunger initiatives, and sustainable development programs. Her work through the Foundation has positively impacted communities in 16 countries across Africa, Asia, and South America. She has served on the boards of several nonprofit organizations, including Agape of Central Alabama and Montgomery Area Nontraditional Equestrians.

== Diplomatic and political career ==
=== U.S. Ambassador to Slovenia ===
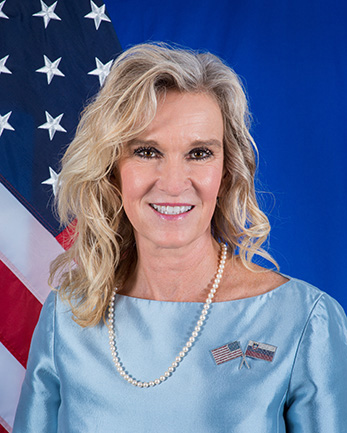
Official Ambassador to Slovenia portrait, 2019

Blanchard was nominated as United States Ambassador to Slovenia by President Donald Trump in June 2018. On July 18, 2019, she was confirmed for the ambassadorship by the U.S. Senate with a 55–41 vote. Blanchard resigned from the post following the inauguration of President Joe Biden and was succeeded by Susan K. Falatko as Charge d'Affaires.

=== 2022 Alabama elections ===
In February 2021, Blanchard announced her candidacy for the 2022 Senate election in Alabama to replace the retiring Senator Richard Shelby, the first candidate to publicly launch a campaign.

Blanchard's most significant opposition was Representative Mo Brooks, who was, at that point, endorsed by former President Donald Trump. In November 2021, The Wall Street Journal reported that Trump was considering endorsing Blanchard if she withdrew her Senate campaign and ran for governor instead.

Blanchard officially switched races on December 7, 2021, announcing during a campaign stop in Wetumpka that she would be running in the 2022 Alabama gubernatorial election instead of the Senate race. Her gubernatorial campaign launched a television advertising campaign on January 3, 2022, which cost approximately $1.175 million, in order to raise her profile among voters in Alabama. However, she never received an endorsement from Donald Trump.

In the May 24 primary, Blanchard finished in second place in the gubernatorial race, with 19% of the vote. However, the election did not go to a run-off, as incumbent Governor Kay Ivey surpassed the threshold to avoid a run-off. Blanchard conceded defeat to Ivey but also indicated that she was interested in pursuing other political efforts in the future.

=== U.S. Ambassador to the U.N. Agencies for Food and Agriculture ===
In March 2025, Trump named Blanchard as his nominee for United States Ambassador to the United Nations Agencies for Food and Agriculture. She was confirmed by the United States Senate on October 7th, 2025 in a 51-47 vote, and assumed her position on November 10, 2025.

== Awards ==
Her humanitarian efforts have earned her numerous accolades, including the Distinguished International Humanitarian Award from the National Council of Women and recognition from the Speaker of the House of Commons of the United Kingdom for her work combating human trafficking in Moldova.

== Personal life ==
She is married to John Blanchard, a businessman in real estate. Together, they donated over $2.6 million to Republicans from 2015 to April 2019. Blanchard is also a mother of eight children and an international adoptive parent.

== Electoral history ==
2022 Alabama Republican gubernatorial primary results
Party	Candidate	Votes	%
Republican	Kay Ivey (incumbent)	356,347	54.46%
Republican	Lynda Blanchard	125,915	19.24%
Republican	Tim James	105,936	16.19%
Republican	Lew Burdette	42,803	6.54%
Republican	Dean Odle	11,720	1.79%
Republican	Donald Trent Jones	3,906	0.58%
Republican	Dave Thomas	2,879	0.44%
Republican	Stacy Lee George	2,539	0.39%
Republican	Dean Young	2,344	0.36%
Total votes		654,290	100%

Diplomatic posts
Preceded by Brent Hartley	United States Ambassador to Slovenia; 2019–2021	Succeeded by Jamie Harpootlian
Preceded by Jeffrey Prescott	United States Ambassador to the United Nations Agencies for Food and Agriculture; 2025–present	Incumbent
