= RFPF =

RFPR may refer to:

- Royal Fiji Police Force
- Russian Free Press Fund founded by Sergey Stepnyak-Kravchinsky
- RF/PF, Vietnam war-era acronym for the combined South Vietnamese Regional Forces and South Vietnamese Popular Force
