= List of ambassadors of the United States to Cameroon =

Ambassador of the United States to Cameroon
- Seal of the United States Department of State

- Flag of a United States ambassador

- Incumbent; John G. Robinson; Chargé d'affaires since January 17, 2026
- Nominator: The president of the United States
- Appointer: The president; with Senate advice and consent
- Inaugural holder: Bolard More as Chargé d'Affaires ad interim
- Formation: January 1, 1960
- Website: cm.usembassy.gov

This is a list of ambassadors from the United States to Cameroon. The American Embassy at Yaounde was established on January 1, 1960, with Bolard More as Chargé d'Affaires ad interim.

== Ambassadors ==
Name	Title	Appointed	Presented credentials	Terminated mission	Notes
Leland Barrows – Career FSO	Ambassador Extraordinary and Plenipotentiary	April 20, 1960	June 9, 1960	September 6, 1966	Accredited also to Togo and resident at Yaounde.
Robert L. Payton – Political appointee	Ambassador Extraordinary and Plenipotentiary	January 26, 1967	March 4, 1967	May 27, 1969	
Lewis Hoffacker – Career FSO	Ambassador Extraordinary and Plenipotentiary	December 2, 1969	December 20, 1969	June 6, 1972	Also accredited to Equatorial Guinea and resident at Yaounde.
C. Robert Moore – Career FSO	Ambassador Extraordinary and Plenipotentiary	June 27, 1972	July 22, 1972	July 28, 1975	Also accredited to Equatorial Guinea and resident at Yaounde.
Herbert J. Spiro – Political appointee	Ambassador Extraordinary and Plenipotentiary	July 24, 1975	September 1, 1975	May 7, 1977	Accredited also to Equatorial Guinea until Mar 14, 1976; resident at Yaounde.
Mabel M. Smythe – Political appointee	Ambassador Extraordinary and Plenipotentiary	May 11, 1977	October 1, 1977	February 24, 1980	Also accredited to Equatorial Guinea
Hume A. Horan – Career FSO	Ambassador Extraordinary and Plenipotentiary	June 30, 1980	July 29, 1980	May 17, 1983	Also accredited to Equatorial Guinea until September 29, 1981
Myles Robert Rene Frechette – Career FSO	Ambassador Extraordinary and Plenipotentiary	May 26, 1983	September 8, 1983	July 30, 1987	
Mark L. Edelman – Political appointee	Ambassador Extraordinary and Plenipotentiary	July 31, 1987	September 9, 1987	March 19, 1989	
Frances D. Cook – Career FSO	Ambassador Extraordinary and Plenipotentiary	November 21, 1989	December 21, 1989	January 1, 1993	
Harriet Winsar Isom – Career FSO	Ambassador Extraordinary and Plenipotentiary	August 17, 1992	January 19, 1993	January 17, 1996	
Charles H. Twining – Career FSO	Ambassador Extraordinary and Plenipotentiary	December 19, 1995	February 28, 1996	August 17, 1998	Also Accredited to Equatorial Guinea and resident at Yaounde.
John Melvin Yates – Career FSO	Ambassador Extraordinary and Plenipotentiary	October 22, 1998	January 5, 1999	November 4, 2001	Also Accredited to Equatorial Guinea and resident at Yaounde.
George McDade Staples – Career FSO	Ambassador Extraordinary and Plenipotentiary	September 5, 2001	December 21, 2001	July 10, 2004	Also accredited to Equatorial Guinea; resident at Yaounde.
R. Niels Marquardt – Career FSO	Ambassador Extraordinary and Plenipotentiary	July 2, 2004	October 29, 2004	April 9, 2007	Also accredited to Equatorial Guinea; resident at Yaounde.
Janet E. Garvey – Career FSO	Ambassador Extraordinary and Plenipotentiary	May 30, 2007	November 9, 2007	August 1, 2010	Also accredited to Equatorial Guinea; resident at Yaounde.
Robert P. Jackson – Career FSO	Ambassador Extraordinary and Plenipotentiary	September 17, 2010	October 12, 2010	October 5, 2013	
Michael Hoza – Career FSO	Ambassador Extraordinary and Plenipotentiary	July 31, 2014	August 22, 2014	September 11, 2017	
Peter Barlerin – Career FSO	Ambassador Extraordinary and Plenipotentiary	November 2, 2017	December 20, 2017	July 16, 2020	
Christopher Lamora – Career FSO	Ambassador Extraordinary and Plenipotentiary	December 18, 2021	March 21, 2022	January 17, 2026	
John G. Robinson – Career FSO	Chargé d'affaires ad interim	January 17, 2026		Present	

== See also ==
- Embassy of Cameroon, Washington, D.C.
- Cameroon – United States relations
- Foreign relations of Cameroon
- Ambassadors of the United States
