= Charles Ebune =

Cameroonian journalist

Charles ebune
- Born: Charlse Ebune; 12 July 1986 (age 39); South west region Cameroon
- Education: universities of Yaoundé I universities of Yaoundé II
- Occupation: Journalist

Charles Ebune (born 12 July 1986) is a Cameroonian journalist. who is notable for being the main anchor of Cameroon's most popular international current affairs programme called Globewatch with an estimated 8 million weekly viewers, available across most social networks.

He was the winner of Sonnah Awards Best TV Presenter in 2013. He holds a degrees and masters in Journalism and History from the universities of University of Yaoundé I and University of Yaoundé II respectively. In 2016 he was listed as one of the 50 most influential young Cameroonians.

== Career ==
Charles Ebune has interviewed the Managing Director of the International Monetary Fund, the former President of the Federation of International Football Association, the former Chairman of the Independent Electoral Commission of Nigeria, the Pan African Parliament President, UN assistant Secretary General, the Executive of the UN Economic Commission for Africa and one of the candidates for next United Nations Secretary General, Unesco Director General, Irina Bokova and the former American ambassador to Cameroon, Michael Hoza.

Ebune has also interviewed the President of the International Committee of the Red Cross, the Executive Director of the World Food Programme, the British Minister for Africa, the President of Switzerland, and the Permanent Representative of the United States to the United Nations. Ebune teaches journalism lessons at the Advanced School of Mass Communication and also serves as the press assistant to the Director General of Elections Cameroon.

== See also ==
- List of Cameroonians
