= R. Niels Marquardt =

American diplomat

Niels Marquardt
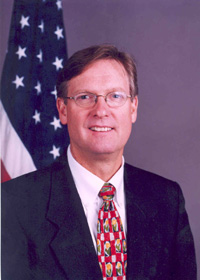

American Consul General to Sydney, Australia
- In office April 23, 2010 – 2013
- Preceded by: Judith R. Fergin

United States Ambassador to Madagascar and Comoros
- In office August 17, 2007 – June 7, 2010
- Appointed by: George W. Bush; Barack Obama
- Preceded by: James McGee
- Succeeded by: Eric W. Stromayer

United States Ambassador to Equatorial Guinea
- In office October 29, 2004 – September 26, 2006
- Appointed by: George W. Bush
- Preceded by: George McDade Staples
- Succeeded by: Donald Johnson

United States Ambassador to Cameroon
- In office October 29, 2004 – April 9, 2007
- Appointed by: George W. Bush
- Preceded by: George McDade Staples
- Succeeded by: Janet E. Garvey

Personal details
- Born: 1953 (age 72–73) San Diego, United States
- Spouse: Judi Marquardt
- Education: Lewis and Clark College; Thunderbird School of Global Management; National War College

R. Niels Marquardt (born 1953 in San Diego, California) is a retired American diplomat and past CEO of the American Chamber of Commerce in Australia.

== Education ==
R. Niels Marquardt graduated from Lewis and Clark College in 1975 with a B.A., the American Graduate School of International Management in 1980, and from the National War College in 1994. Prior to joining the Foreign Service, Marquardt served from 1977 to 1979 as a Peace Corps Volunteer in Rwanda.

== Career ==
Marquardt joined the U.S. foreign service in 1980. He served as the U.S. Ambassador to the Republic of Madagascar and the Union of the Comoros from 2007 to 2010. He was nominated by President George W. Bush on March 26, 2007. On May 25, 2007, the Senate confirmed his nomination. He was sworn in on August 17, 2007. He also served as the U.S. Ambassador to the Republic of Cameroon from 2004 to 2007 and as U.S. Ambassador to the Republic of Equatorial Guinea from 2004 to 2006. From 2001 to 2004, he served as the Special Coordinator for Diplomatic Readiness. In this role, he was responsible for coordinating the largest increase in State Department recruiting, hiring, and training in its history. A senior Foreign Service officer, class of Minister-Counselor, he also served in 1998 to 2000 as Director of the Department's Entry-level Counseling and Assignments Division in the Bureau of Human Resources.

Marquardt's overseas assignments as an economic officer have taken him to Germany (1995–98), France (1990–94), Thailand twice (1981–83, 1987–90) and Brazzaville, Congo (1983–85). He also served mainly in the Bureau of East Asian and Pacific Affairs and as a Country Risk Analyst at the Export-Import Bank of the United States. Additionally, he attended the Senior Seminar and the Economic-Commercial Studies Program at the Department's Foreign Service Institute.

== Awards and honours ==
Marquardt is the recipient of several Meritorious and Superior Honor Awards as well as the Presidential Performance Pay on four occasions.

== Personal life ==
Marquardt is married to Judith Marquardt and they have four daughters, Kaia, Kelsey, Torrin, and Yannika. His foreign languages include French, German, Thai, and Spanish.

Diplomatic posts
Preceded by George McDade Staples	United States Ambassador to Cameroon; 2001–2004	Succeeded by Janet E. Garvey
Preceded by George McDade Staples	United States Ambassador to Equatorial Guinea; 2004–2006	Succeeded by Donald C. Johnson
Preceded by James D. McGee	United States Ambassador to Madagascar; 2007–2010	Succeeded by Eric W. Stromayer
Preceded by James D. McGee	United States Ambassador to Comoros; 2007–2010	Succeeded by Eric W. Stromayer
