= Stuart Rabinowitz =

Former Hofstra University President (born 1945)

8th President of Hofstra University
- In office June 2001 – July 31, 2021
- Preceded by: James M. Shuart
- Succeeded by: Susan Poser

Fifth Dean of Hofstra Law
- In office September 1989 – June 2001
- Preceded by: Eric J. Schmertz
- Succeeded by: David Yellen

Personal details
- Born: November 2, 1945 (age 80) Bronx, New York
- Party: Republican (Since 2000)
- Other political affiliations: Democratic (Before 2000)
- Children: 2
- Education: City College of New York (BA); Columbia University (JD)
- Salary: $1,594,549 (2019)
- Website: Office of the President

Stuart Rabinowitz was the 8th president of Hofstra University. Before assuming the presidency, he was dean of Hofstra Law School for over a decade and before that was a distinguished professor of law.

== Hofstra University ==
Rabinowitz started his career as a law professor at Hofstra Law School in 1972, when the law school was only in its second year. He was named dean of the law school in 1989, and currently holds the Andrew M. Boas and Mark L. Claster Distinguished Professor of Law.

=== Presidential Tenure ===
Rabinowitz was named Hofstra's eighth president on December 20, 2000, following the retirement of James M. Shuart, and began his tenure as president in July 2001. In February 2002, Rabinowitz laid out the plan to transform the prior courthouse in Hempstead to the location of the university's school of education and the school of health professions and human services. The building is now known as Hagedorn Hall. Hofstra Stadium would also be renamed James M. Shuart Stadium.

During his tenure, Hofstra has hosted three consecutive presidential debates and launched several new schools, including the Donald and Barbara Zucker School of Medicine at Hofstra/Northwell, the Hofstra-Northwell School of Nursing and Physician Assistant Studies, the Fred DeMatteis School of Engineering and Applied Science, the Peter S. Kalikow School of Government, Public Policy and International Affairs and the School of Health Professions and Human Services. He also founded the National Center for Suburban Studies, the Center for Entrepreneurship and the Cybersecurity Innovation and Research Center. The university has also invested heavily in new buildings and facilities, including a new, $52 million state-of-the-art building for the Frank G. Zarb School of Business, which opened in 2019 and was recently renamed the Leo A. Guthart Hall for Innovation and Discovery, as well buildings dedicated to the arts and humanities and graduate student housing. In the summer of 2021, the university plans to break ground on a new building to house the school of nursing and the school of engineering and applied science.

=== Medical School, Nursing School and focus on Sciences and Health Professions ===
In 2008, Hofstra University entered an agreement with North Shore-LIJ Health System (now Northwell Health) to establish the first allopathic medical school in Nassau County and the first in New York state in nearly 40 years. The school became known for its unique curriculum focusing on early, meaningful patient care experience for students, including requiring all first-year students to work as EMTs in the Northwell system. In the fall of 2011, the university welcomed the first class of students in its new Hofstra Northwell School of Medicine. In August 2017, after a $61 million donation to the school, it was renamed the Donald and Barbara Zucker School of Medicine at Hofstra/Northwell.

In 2009, Rabinowitz and the board of trustees made a difficult, controversial decision to end Hofstra's Division 1 football program, citing cost and waning student and fan interest. At the time, Rabinowitz said the university was making a strategic decision to invest the money it spent on football into scholarships and expanding academic programs, such as undergraduate and graduate programs in the sciences and health professions, and the new medical school. Rabinowitz told Newsday: "We have a new medical school coming on line, we need to take advantage of the opportunities it offers."

In 2012, the university launched the School of Health Professions and Human Services, to bring renewed energy and an interdisciplinary focus to its health professions curriculum – including the creation of several new programs, such as a Master of Public Health degree. In 2015, Hofstra expanded its partnership with Northwell Health by establishing the Hofstra Northwell School of Graduate Nursing and Physician Assistant Studies.

Announcing the establishment of the school, Hofstra University President Stuart Rabinowitz described it as an important expansion of the university's partnership with the North Shore–LIJ Health System. He emphasized the growing need for highly trained healthcare professionals and stated that the new school would strengthen Hofstra's healthcare education offerings. Rabinowitz noted that, alongside the university's medical school and School of Health Sciences and Human Services, the institution would contribute to the development of a comprehensive healthcare education network serving the region.

Five years later, the university announced the addition of an undergraduate nursing program, which will welcome its first class in Fall 2021.

=== Presidential debates ===
In 2008, Hofstra hosted the third and final presidential debate between Barack Obama and John McCain. The university applied to the Commission on Presidential Debates again for the 2012 election cycle and was chosen to host the second, Town Hall-style debate between President Barack Obama and Mitt Romney. Four years later, Hofstra was designated a debate-site alternate for the 2016 presidential election cycle. In July 2016, Wright State University in Ohio, which was scheduled to host the first presidential debate on Sept. 26, 2016, dropped out, citing costs and security concerns. As the alternate, Hofstra hosted the first debate between Secretary of State Hillary Clinton and Donald J. Trump, making it the only university to ever host three consecutive presidential debates. During Rabinowitz's tenure, the university prioritized civic engagement, launching voter registration campaigns and hosting debates for local and statewide races as well, including Nassau County Executive, Nassau County District Attorney and New York state Governor.

In January 2020, Rabinowitz announced he would retire at the end of his term, Aug. 31, 2021, after 20 years as president and nearly 50 years at Hofstra.

Preceded by James M. Shuart	President of Hofstra University; 2001–2021	Succeeded by Susan Poser
