= Susan Poser =

American Academic Administrator

9th President of Hofstra University
- Incumbent
- Assumed office August 1, 2021
- Preceded by: Stuart Rabinowitz

Provost and Vice Chancellor for Academic Affairs at University of Illinois at Chicago
- In office February 1, 2016 – July 31, 2020
- Preceded by: Lon Kaufman
- Succeeded by: Javier Reyes

Dean of University of Nebraska College of Law
- In office May 15, 2010 – January 31, 2016
- Preceded by: Steven Willborn
- Succeeded by: Richard Moberly

Personal details
- Born: September 7, 1963 (age 63) Washington, D.C., U.S.
- Spouse: Stephen DiMagno (m. 1990)
- Children: 2
- Education: Swarthmore College (BA) University of California, Berkeley (JD, PhD)
- Website: www.hofstra.edu/president/

Academic background
- Thesis: Rights, remedies, and organizational change: A theory for school desegregation (2000)
- Doctoral advisor: Malcolm M. Feeley

Academic work
- Discipline: Jurisprudence
- Sub-discipline: Sociology of Law
- Institutions: University of Nebraska–Lincoln University of Illinois-Chicago Hofstra University

Susan Poser (born September 7, 1963) is the current and first female president of Hofstra University, having succeeded retiring president Stuart Rabinowitz on August 1, 2021. Before being named to the Hofstra post, she was chief operating officer, provost, and vice chancellor for academic affairs at the University of Illinois at Chicago.

== Early life ==
Susan Poser was born to Norman Stanley Poser (born May 28, 1928, in Hampstead, London, England) and Miriam Poser (née Kugelman; born October 17, 1930, in Moers, Germany) on September 7, 1963, in Washington, D.C. Her father had immigrated to the United States from Genoa, Italy in 1939, and would go on to be an attorney for the Security and Exchange Commission, executive vice president of the American Stock Exchange, and a professor at Brooklyn Law School. Her mother had immigrated to the United States from Germany in 1936 to escape anti-Semitic persecution.

Poser attended Columbia Prep until 8th grade, when she went to high school at Fieldston. She also spent her early summers attending the Interlochen National Music Camp, where she would eventually also work.

== Education ==
Poser graduated from Swarthmore College in 1985 with a Bachelor of Arts with honors in ancient Greek and political science. Poser held teaching positions at both Anatolia College and Armstrong Preparatory School as an English teacher from 1985 to 1986 and 1986 to 1987, respectively. After receiving her J.D. from the UC Berkeley School of Law in 1991, Poser clerked for Dolores Sloviter, Chief Judge for the United States Court of Appeals for the Third Circuit. Poser served as a Zicklin Fellow in Ethics of the Wharton School at the University of Pennsylvania. She received a Ph.D. from UC Berkeley in 2000.

== Career ==
=== University of Nebraska-Lincoln ===
Poser began to work at the University of Nebraska–Lincoln in 1994, as a visiting professor of law. She officially became a part of the faculty in 1999. In 2003, Poser was appointed by the Nebraska State Bar Association to review policies in the Model Rules of Professional Conduct, which resulted in her publication of Multijurisdictional Practice for a Multijurisdictional Profession. In 2004, Poser was awarded the College of Law's distinguished teaching award. In 2005, she would receive the State Bar's Shining Light Award for her work, as well as becoming the director of the Robert J. Kutak Center for the Teaching & Study of Applied Ethics. Poser was appointed as the associate to chancellor Harvey Perlman in 2007 and served until 2010. She became a full professor of law in 2008. Poser was then appointed University of Nebraska College of Law's dean in 2010. The semester before, Perlman wanted to appoint her as a provost, but the proposal was rejected. During her tenure, the law school moved up 33 places in the U.S. News & World Report rankings.

=== University of Illinois at Chicago ===
In 2016, Poser was appointed provost and vice chancellor of academic affairs at the University of Illinois-Chicago. During that time, many initiatives were initiated, most notably the acquisition of John Marshall Law School making it the first public law school in Chicago. Poser oversaw the highest student enrollment ever at the university as it set records for six years in a row, culminating with a 33,598 student enrollment in 2020. However, her tenure also saw a strike from graduate assistants and teaching assistants in regard to pay. This strike would last about three weeks and cancel over 550 classes.

=== Hofstra University ===
Poser was named Hofstra University's ninth president on December 9, 2020, and assumed the post on August 1, 2021, becoming the first woman to be president of Hofstra. In an interview with the Valley Stream Herald, Dr. Poser outlined her priorities as the next president, which include a commitment to the liberal arts, meeting as many people and perspectives as possible, promoting a "culture of inclusion" and possibly still including virtual learning after the COVID-19 pandemic at the university.

== Personal life ==
Poser is Jewish on both her mother and father's side. She is married to professor and researcher Stephen DiMagno.

== Bibliography ==
- Poser, Susan and Varon, Elizabeth R., "United States v. Steinmetz: The Legal Legacy of the Civil War, Revisited" (1995). College of Law, Faculty Publications. 42. https://digitalcommons.unl.edu/lawfacpub/42
- Poser, Susan, "The Ethics of Implementation: Institutional Remedies and the Lawyer's Role" (1996). College of Law, Faculty Publications. 43. https://digitalcommons.unl.edu/lawfacpub/43
- Susan Poser, Termination of Desegregation Decrees and the Elusive Meaning of Unitary Status, 81 Neb. L. Rev. (2002) Available at: https://digitalcommons.unl.edu/nlr/vol81/iss1/5
- Poser, S. Multijurisdictional Practice for a Multijurisdictional Profession, 81 Neb. L. Rev. (2002) Available at: https://digitalcommons.unl.edu/nlr/vol81/iss4/7
- Poser, Susan; Bornstein, Brian H.; and McGorty, Erinn Kiernan, "Measuring Damages for Lost Enjoyment of Life: The View from the Bench and the Jury Box" (2003). Faculty Publications, Department of Psychology. 147. https://digitalcommons.unl.edu/psychfacpub/147
- Susan Poser, Main Street Multidisciplinary Practice Firms: Laboratories for the Future, 37 U. MICH. J. L. REFORM 95 (2003). Available at: https://repository.law.umich.edu/mjlr/vol37/iss1/3
- Poser, S. (2004). What's a Judge to Do? Remedying the Remedy in Institutional Reform Litigation. Michigan Law Review, 102(6), 1307–1327. doi:10.2307/4141947
- Poser, Susan, Unlabeled Drug Samples and the Learned Intermediary: The Case for Liability Without Preemption (December 1, 2007). Food and Drug Law Journal, Vol. 62, p. 653, 2007, Available at SSRN: https://ssrn.com/abstract=978802
- Bornstein, Brian H. and Poser, Susan (2007) "Perceptions of Procedural and Distributive Justice in the September 11th Victim Compensation Fund," Cornell Journal of Law and Public Policy: Vol. 17: Iss. 1, Article 2. Available at: https://scholarship.law.cornell.edu/cjlpp/vol17/iss1/2/
- Poser S. (2008) Damages as Metaphor: A Commentary. In: Bornstein B.H., Wiener R.L., Schopp R.F., Willborn S.L. (eds) Civil Juries and Civil Justice. Springer, New York, NY. https://doi.org/10.1007/978-0-387-74490-2_7
- Riedesel, Charles & Manley, Eric & Poser, Susan & Deogun, Jitender. (2009). A model academic ethics and integrity policy for computer science departments. ACM SIGCSE Bulletin. 41. 357–361. https://doi.org/10.1145/1539024.1508994.
- Case Commentary: Conflict of Interest in Hiring. Michael Pritchard, et al., The Ethical Challenges of Academic Administration (Springer 2010).
- Poser, S., & Rische, J. (2015). Satellite telecommunications and American tort law. Dispute Settlement in the Area of Space Communication, 161–174. https://doi.org/10.5771/9783845258584-161

Preceded by Stuart Rabinowitz	President of Hofstra University; August 2021–present	Succeeded by Incumbent
