= South Vietnamese Regional Forces =

Regional Force
- Địa phương quân
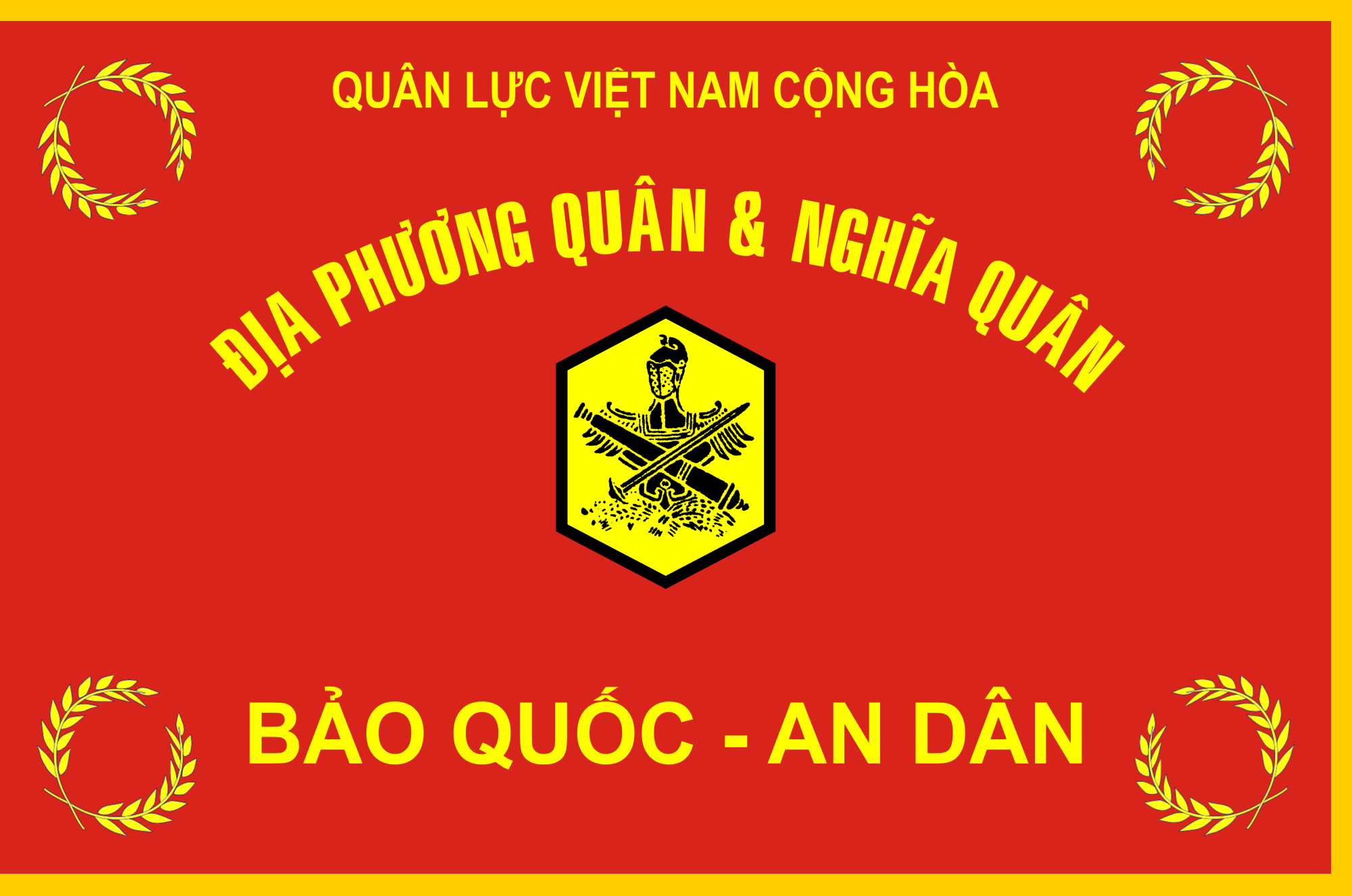
- ARVN-RF/PF flag
- Active: 1955-1975
- Disbanded: 30 April 1975
- Country: South Vietnam
- Type: Territorial defence
- Size: 300,646 (1972 authorized strength)
- Nickname: Ruff-Puffs (used by American forces)
- Mottos: Bảo quốc, An dân (Protect the Nation, Safeguard the People)
- Engagements: Vietnam War

The South Vietnamese Regional Forces (Vietnamese: Địa phương quân, lit. "Local Army"), originally the Civil Guard, were a component of Army of the Republic of Vietnam (ARVN) territorial defence forces. Recruited locally, they served as full-time province-level forces, originally raised as a militia. In 1964, the Regional Forces were integrated into the ARVN and placed under the command of the Joint General Staff.

The concept of Regional Forces was to counter the Viet Cong (VC) Local Force units, while the ARVN regular forces fought the better equipped VC Main Force units and the People's Army of Vietnam (PAVN). Local militia came to play a very effective role in the war, as the style of small-unit warfare was better suited for guerrilla conflicts with most more familiar with the region and terrain. Despite being poorly paid, these forces were much more capable at detecting infiltration and holding civilian areas. Accounting for an estimated 2-5% of war budget, the Regional Force and the Popular Forces were thought to have accounted for roughly 30% of casualties inflicted upon VC/PAVN throughout the entire war. Part of this derives in these units generally being more capable of engaging in small-unit, highly-mobile tactics which proved difficult for slow-moving equipment-heavy units.

== History ==
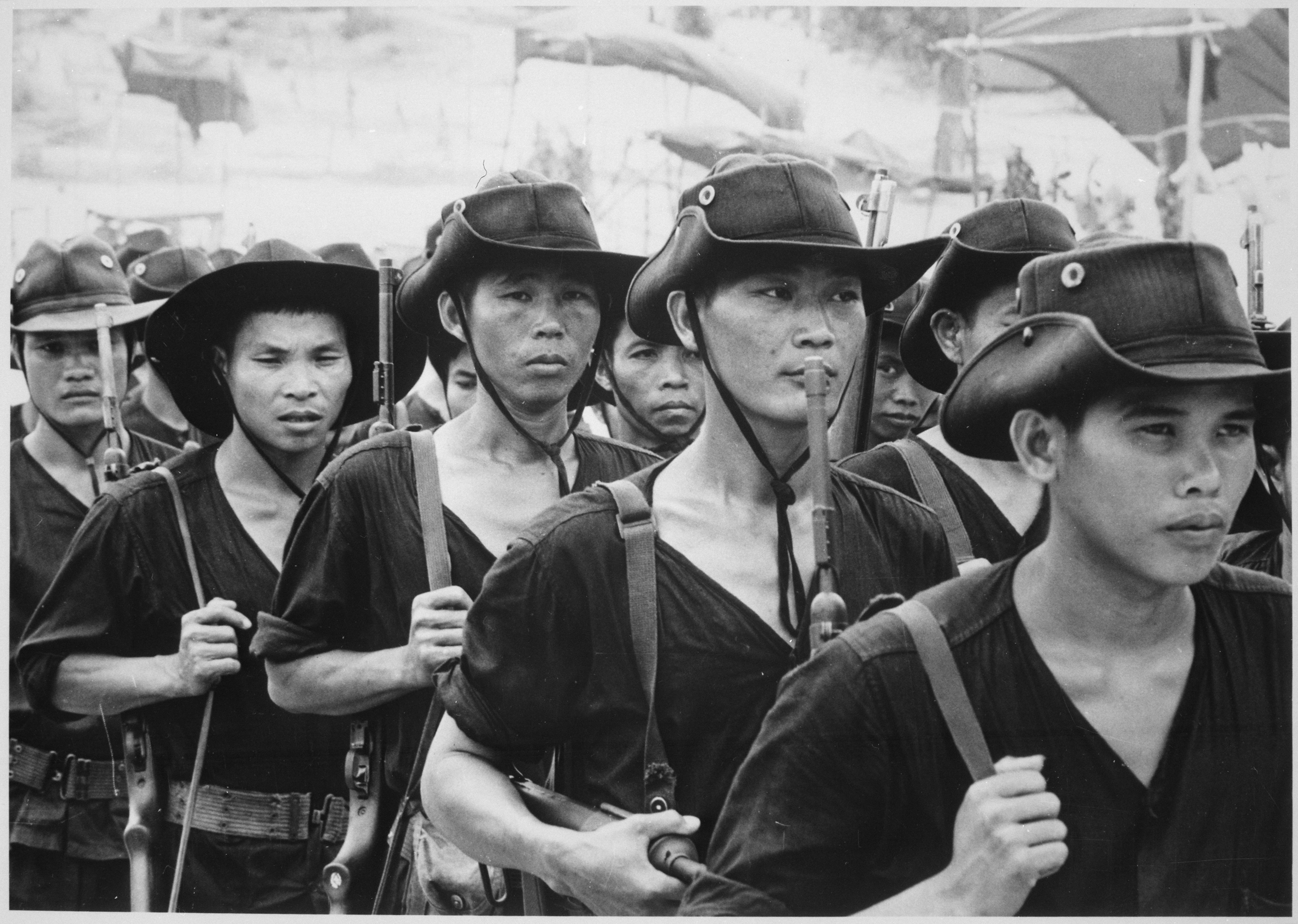
Vietnamese recruits undergoing Regional Forces training c. 1970

The Civil Guard (Dân vệ) was established in April 1955 by a decree of President Ngo Dinh Diem from members of inactivated wartime paramilitary agencies. Its primary function was to relieve the regular forces of internal security duties, with additional missions of local intelligence collection and countersubversion. The Civil Guard was initially under the direct control of the President, but in September 1958 it was placed under the control of the Ministry of the Interior.

In 1955, with the precipitate withdrawal of the French Far East Expeditionary Corps and renewal of hostilities by North Vietnam both considered likely, a six-week civil guard course was instituted for militiamen.

A survey in May 1957 had revealed that there were 54,000 men enrolled in the paramilitary Civil Guard; 7,000 in the municipal police; 3,500 in the Vietnamese Bureau of Investigation, or Sûreté; an undetermined number in the Gendarmerie; and about 50,000 in the Self-Defense Corps. Impressive in size only, these forces generally were poorly equipped, ill-trained, and poorly disciplined. Unlike the static, part-time Self-Defense Corps, the Civil Guard was a more mobile unit organized to patrol the rural districts and was composed of armed, uniformed, full-time personnel responsible for maintaining law and order and collecting intelligence. Since May 1955, a group of police and public administration specialists from Michigan State University under contract to the U.S. Operations Mission had been working on a number of projects to improve the training and operations of the security forces. The group established a six-week basic training course, which had trained 14,000 Civil Guardsmen by mid-1957, and also set up a national police academy. The Michigan State University advisers saw the Civil Guard as a civilian police force similar to the Texas Rangers.

Diem had different ideas about the guard. Since the entire ARVN would be needed in the event of invasion to defend along the 17th Parallel, he maintained that a strong internal security organization was crucial to control the Central Highlands and the Mekong Delta. Thus, the Civil Guard should be "capable of assisting the army in rear areas in time of war." Diem wanted the Ministry of Defense to assume responsibility for training, disciplining, and supplying the guard, but in peacetime it would remain under the operational control of the interior minister. He wanted the Civil Guard's officers to be graduates of the military academy and to have an additional year of training in jurisprudence and traffic control. Since Diem saw the Civil Guard as a kind of second-line army, he wanted it to be unusually well armed and equipped with helicopters and armored cars. While Diem spoke of internal security and military defense, his real interest in the Civil Guard was political. Most members of the guard were former militiamen from the Catholic regions of North Vietnam who had fled south after the Viet Minh victory in 1954 and were among Diem's most loyal supporters. Diem wanted to develop the Civil Guard into a strong force to counter the power of a possibly disloyal army. When the advisers from Michigan State University insisted that a lightly armed but well-trained territorial police force was more appropriate to the needs of South Vietnam, Diem was contemptuous. United States Ambassador to South Vietnam Elbridge Durbrow and U.S. Operations Mission chief Leland Barrows were dubious about Diem's plans for the Civil Guard and insisted that the Civil Guard was a civilian police force, not a paramilitary body, and thus ought to remain fully under control of the Ministry of the Interior. They believed that Washington would probably view a heavily armed, 50,000-man Civil Guard as an attempt to circumvent the 150,000-man ceiling on the South Vietnamese armed forces. Indeed Durbrow and U.S. Operations Mission chief Leland Barrows believed that the Military Assistance Advisory Group (MAAG) had always wanted a larger army and that MAAG commander General Samuel Tankersley Williams, with Diem's encouragement, was simply using the Civil Guard issue as a device for covertly expanding the size of the armed forces.

At the beginning of 1958, the Operations Mission had available about $3.5 million for equipping the guard, which, Williams estimated, was sufficient to arm about 10,000 men with M1 rifles, M1 carbines, Browning Automatic Rifles and submachine guns, yet Barrows refused to release those funds as long as Diem insisted on transferring any functions of the guard to the Defense Ministry. The South Vietnamese government then presented a proposal for the organization and equipment of the Civil Guard. The plan called for a force of 55,000 men organized into companies: 225 light infantry, 15 armored, 21 horse, 26 riverine and 13 mobile infantry. They were to be armed with artillery, light tanks, scout cars, half-tracks and helicopters. The fantastic proposal confirmed the suspicions of the Operations Mission that Diem simply intended to use the Civil Guard as a private army. In January 1959, Diem agreed to allow a newly formed Public Safety Division of the U.S. Operations Mission to assume responsibility for training the Civil Guard, but General Williams, who doubted that Americans with police rather than military backgrounds could successfully reorganize and train the Civil Guard, continued to advocate training by the Defense Ministry with advisers from MAAG.

On 15 February 1960, without consulting General Williams or any other American, Diem began a new program by ordering commanders of divisions and military regions to form ranger companies composed of volunteers from the ARVN, the reserves, retired ARVN personnel, and the Civil Guard. Trained in antiguerrilla warfare, each company was to have 131 men: an 11-man headquarters and three 40-man platoons. The military regions and divisions were expected to organize 50 companies by early March. Of these, 32 would be attached to the various military regions and 18 to the divisions. Williams and his staff saw Diem's newest project as "hasty, ill-considered, and destructive to overall instruments of power." What was needed to conquer the VC, Williams believed, was not specialized units but a reorganized, well-equipped, and revitalized Civil Guard; intensive training for units between operations; an improved counterintelligence system; and a clear chain of command.

By early 1960, the Guard consisted of some 53,000 men still organized, after the French fashion, into stationary, mobile, and border companies. These units were scattered throughout South Vietnam, with the national headquarters in Saigon exercising no effective control. Within each province, command of Civil Guard units was assigned to the province chiefs, who in some cases had no military experience. The Joint Chiefs of Staff and the Defense Department strongly supported the MAAG recommendation that the operational control of the Civil Guard and its training be assigned to the Vietnamese Ministry of Defense for the duration of the insurgency. However, State and Defense representatives in Saigon were unable to reach a final agreement on the question. Although Durbrow and his staff no longer questioned the need for MAAG to train the Civil Guard in view of the level of insurgency, he still objected to transferring the Civil Guard from the Ministry of the Interior to the Ministry of Defense. If that were done, Durbrow said, the guard would soon be virtually amalgamated with the ARVN and "eventually all hope that [it] will serve as a provincial police force will be lost."

In January 1961, faced with a mounting VC insurgency, a new draft counterinsurgency plan was sent to Washington which included expanding the Civil Guard to 68,000 men with slightly less than half of them trained, equipped, and supplied at American expense and the transfer of the Civil Guard to the Ministry of Defense.

Following the 1963 South Vietnamese coup, the ARVN reorganised the Civil Guard into the Regional Forces and the Self-Defense Corps was combined with several other paramilitary organizations to become the Popular Forces. Collectively, they became the Territorial Forces, better known in American circles by the combined initials RF/PF, or by the term 'Ruff-Puff'. Subsequently, the two were placed under the Joint General Staff (JGS) and given a single chain of command, but remained separate from the regular ARVN until 1970. In general, province chiefs controlled Regional Forces companies, and district and village chiefs directed Popular Forces platoons. Normally, the province chief was also the sector, or military, commander of his province, and the district chief was the subsector commander. For military affairs, both reported to the local division commander.

In 1965, COMUSMACV General William Westmoreland planned to expand the Regional Force by a further 35,387 to release more of the ARVN regular force for offensive operations. In mid-June 1965 the number of authorized Regional Forces rifle companies stood at 959. The Regional Forces also included separate mechanized (armored car) platoons, boat companies, railway guard detachments, and, in each province, at least one company to provide administrative and logistical support. The primary mission of all territorial combat units remained local security. Desertion within the Civil Guard/Regional Force was a continual problem with the following rates: 6,764 in 1962; 8,235 in 1963, 14,961 in 1964 and 16,647 in 1965. The Regional Forces, the principal arm of the province and district chiefs, grew to about 130,000 soldiers by the end of 1965, coming so close to their planned strength that Westmoreland thought it safe to approve another increase of 20,000 for 1966-67.

During 1966 and 1967, Regional Forces strength was to rise from 134,999 to 155,322 and the number of rifle companies from 767 to 888, with personnel for 40 of the new companies coming from deactivated Civilian Irregular Defense Group program (CIDG) units. As in 1965, Westmoreland felt that the JGS could easily and cheaply expand the territorials because they required little training and drew from a much broader pool of manpower. During the first six months of 1966 the monthly desertion rate (desertions per 1,000 troops assigned) of the Regional Forces was 12.3. By June 1966, high desertion rates and recruiting shortfalls in the territorial components finally led Westmoreland to freeze the authorized force structure and to make drastic reductions in his projected increases. During the course of the year, he trimmed the proposed strength of the Regional Forces from 155,322 to 152,560.

In 1966, the JGS transformed the semiautonomous Territorial Forces command into a directorate of the JGS and established separate staff sections for Territorial Forces in each Corps headquarters to supervise province and district security forces, further strengthening ARVN control.

In March 1967, at Westmoreland's suggestion, JGS Chairman General Cao Văn Viên activated 88 new Regional Forces companies. In July, Westmoreland proposed an expansion of 85,000 to the Regional Forces, to provide men for new rifle companies and platoons and for province and district military staffs, territorial support companies, and territorial pipeline strength (personnel in training, hospitalized, on leave, and so forth). Even this, Westmoreland felt, was insufficient, but he believed that it was the most that South Vietnam's recruiting and training systems could handle. By October 1967, the Territorial Forces consisted of 896 Regional Forces companies (equipped with carbines, machine guns, M79 grenade launchers, radios and trucks); 24 riverine companies (with eight landing boats each), all in the Mekong Delta area; and, in each province, one logistics company, one mechanized platoon (with six armored cars), one intelligence or scout platoon and 1 training camp. Of this force, MACV estimated that only 213 Regional Forces companies were providing direct support for the revolutionary development effort. The remaining territorial units were presumably either in the process of formation, in training, defending bases and installations, outposting roads, or conducting conventional combat operations.

With an average of 20 Regional Forces companies and 100 Popular Forces platoons in each province, the province and district military staffs were swamped with staff work, and MACV considered establishing some sort of intermediate tactical command (for example, a territorial group or battalion headquarters) to ease their growing control problems. The province Territorial Forces adviser, normally an Army captain, and the small district advisory teams (still about four men each) assisted the territorial units as best they could, but the Territorial Forces advisory effort was too small to have much of an impact, and advisers spent most of their time working behind the scenes to make the weak territorial command, administration and supply system work. The regular ARVN continued to support the territorials with some training and supplies, but showed little interest in their deployment and operations. Between July and December 1967, the JGS activated 99 Regional Forces companies.

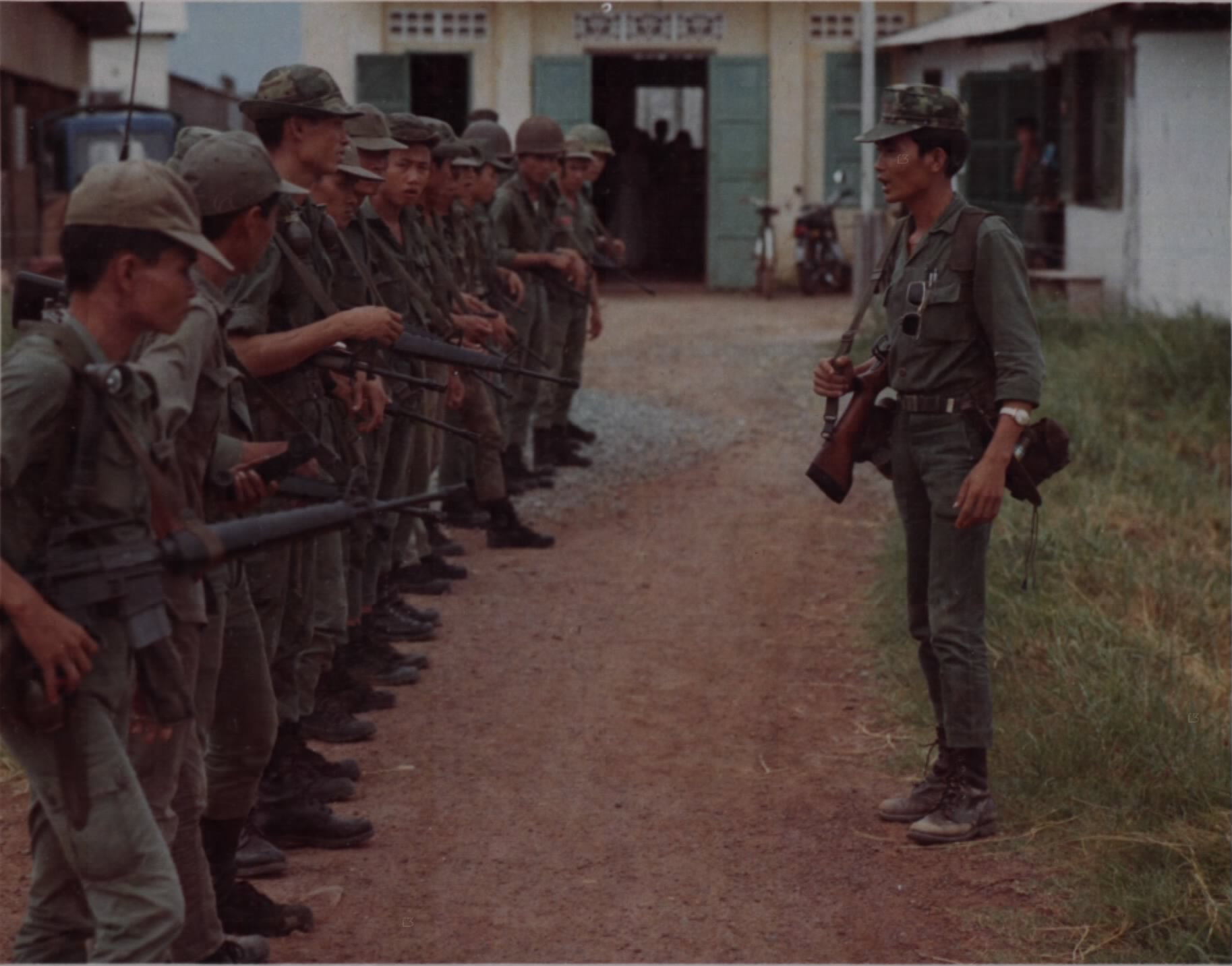
Regional Forces unit prepares for patrol at the Tan Qui Dong outpost, Gia Dinh Province, 9 September 1968

In late February 1968, in the wake of the Tet Offensive, Westmoreland requested 268,000 M16 rifles and 11,200 M79 grenade launchers for the territorials, who with their Korean War era small arms were outgunned by the PAVN/VC. In 1968, the JGS arranged unit training for 176 new Regional Forces companies and refresher training for 89 Regional Forces companies. It also supervised training for 44 new Regional Forces heavy weapons platoons.

In 1969, the JGS proposed expanding the Regional Forces by 23,000 men for 46 Regional Forces companies and the conversion of CIDG units into Regional Forces, thus freeing more regular forces from their area security missions

In 1971, the JGS and MACV oversaw the creation of more Regional Forces battalion headquarters for better territorial command and control. In mid-1972, the paper strength of the Regional Forces was 300,646 with command exercised by each Corps headquarters. The Regional Forces accounted for US$227.4m of a total defense budget of US$2,228m or approximately 10%.

== See also ==
- South Vietnamese Popular Forces
