= James D. McGee =

American diplomat

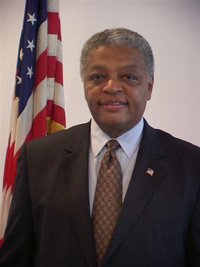
James D. McGee. U.S. State Dept Photo

James David McGee (born 1949) is an American diplomat who served as U.S. Ambassador to Zimbabwe, Swaziland, Madagascar, and the Comoros.

== Early life ==
McGee was born in Chicago, Illinois. He joined the United States Air Force in 1968 and in 1969, he attended the Defense Language Institute in Monterey, California to learn Vietnamese. He served with the 6994th Security Squadron flying aboard EC-47 aircraft in Vietnam during the Vietnam War, earning three Distinguished Flying Crosses. He left the Air Force in 1974. He graduated from Indiana University Bloomington with a bachelor's degree in political science in 1977. He is married to Shirley Jean French McGee.

== Foreign service ==
He previously served as the third Secretary and Vice Consul at the American Embassy in Lagos, Nigeria from 1982 to 1984, Administrative Officer at the American Consulate General in Lahore, Pakistan from 1984 to 1986, Second Secretary and Supervisory General Services Officer at the American Embassy in The Hague, The Netherlands from 1986 to 1989, Administrative Officer at the American Consulate General in Bombay, India from 1989 to 1991, U.S. Department of State's Special Assistant in the Bureau of Finance and Management Policy from 1991 to 1992, Administrative Counselor in Bridgetown, Barbados from 1992 to 1995, Administrative Counselor at the American Embassy in Kingston, Jamaica from 1995 to 1998, Administrative Counselor in Abidjan, Côte d'Ivoire from 1998 to 2001, and ambassador to Swaziland from 2002 to 2004. McGee became the U.S. ambassador to Madagascar on October 24, 2004, and took on the additional role of ambassador to the Comoros on March 5, 2006. McGee was confirmed by the Senate in October 2007 and succeeded Christopher Dell as U.S. Ambassador to Zimbabwe, serving in that position from 2007 to 2009.

James McGee was threatened with expulsion from Zimbabwe by the president, Robert Mugabe, after McGee had told the press of politically inspired attacks by Mugabe's government against political activists in anticipation of the run-off election between Mugabe and his rival, Morgan Tsvangirai.

Diplomatic posts
Preceded by Gregory Lee Johnson	United States Ambassador to Swaziland; 2002–2004	Succeeded by Lewis W. Lucke
Preceded by Wanda L. Nesbitt	United States Ambassador to Madagascar; 2004–2007	Succeeded by R. Niels Marquardt
Preceded by Christopher W. Dell	United States Ambassador to Zimbabwe; 2007–2009	Succeeded by Charles A. Ray
