= Peter Barlerin =

American diplomat

Peter Henry Barlerin
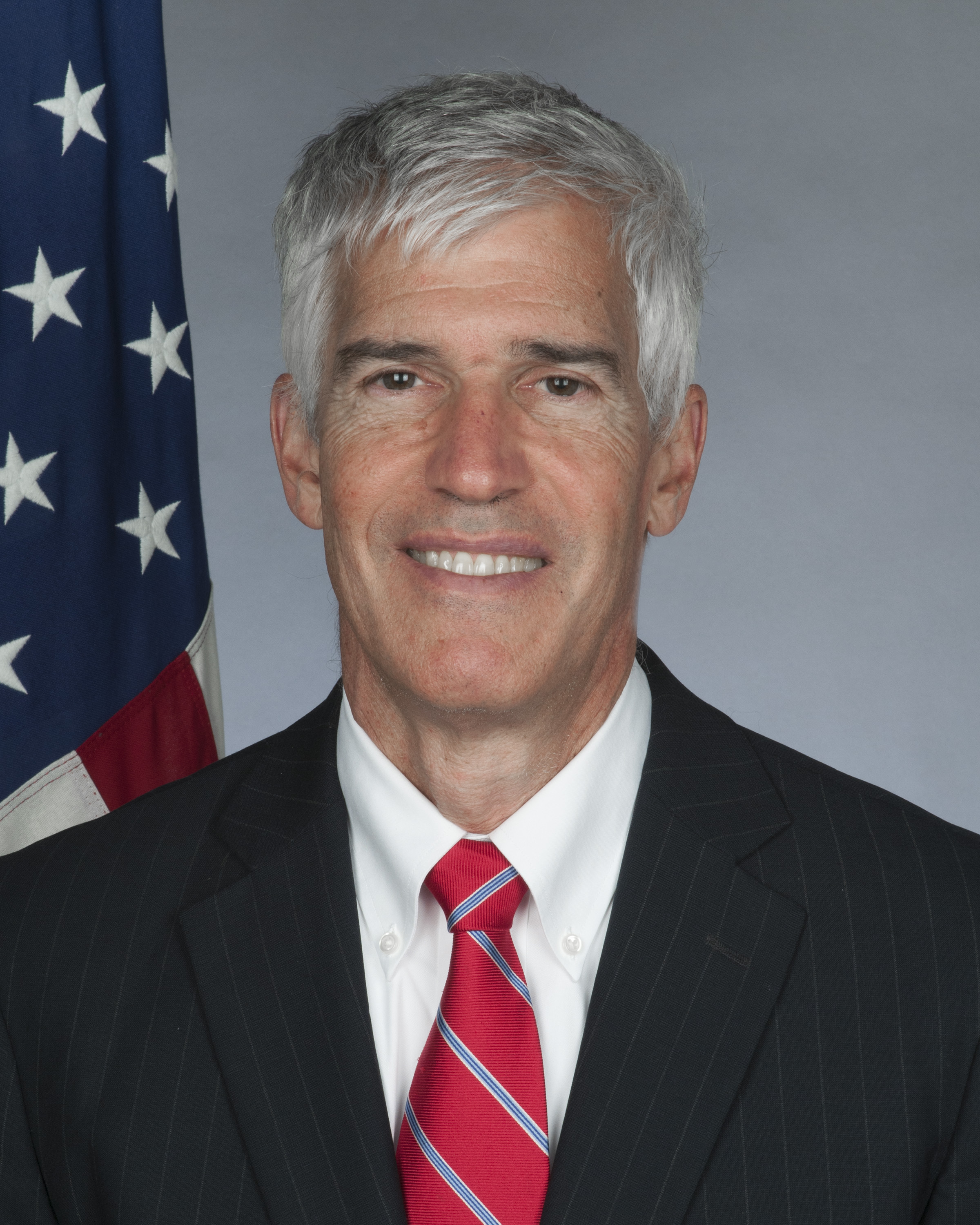

United States Ambassador to Cameroon
- In office December 20, 2017 – July 16, 2020
- President: Donald Trump
- Preceded by: Michael Hoza
- Succeeded by: Christopher J. Lamora

Personal details
- Education: Middlebury College; University of Maryland, College Park; Bullis School, Potomac MD

Peter Henry Barlerin is an American diplomat and career member of the Senior Foreign Service who served as the United States Ambassador to Cameroon from 2017 to 2020. He has served as an American diplomat since 1989. Prior to becoming an ambassador, he was the Deputy Assistant Secretary in the Bureau of African Affairs at the United States Department of State. Barlerin has served at seven U.S. missions overseas, including posts in Madagascar, Japan, France, Chad, and Mali.

== Personal life ==
Barlerin speaks French, Japanese, Spanish, and Norwegian.

Diplomatic posts
Preceded by Michael Hoza	United States Ambassador to Cameroon; 2017–2020	Succeeded by Christopher J. Lamora
