= Robert L. Payton =

American academic, ambassador, and writer (1926–2011)

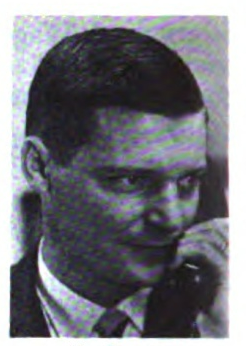

6th President of Hofstra University
- In office June 20, 1973 – June 23, 1976
- Preceded by: James H. Marshall
- Succeeded by: James M. Shuart

President of C.W. Post College
- In office September 9th, 1969 – August 31st, 1973
- Preceded by: R. Gordon Hoxie
- Succeeded by: Edward J. Cook

3rd United States Ambassador to Cameroon
- In office June 26th, 1967 – May 27th, 1969
- President: Lyndon B. Johnson
- Preceded by: Leland Barrows
- Succeeded by: Lewis Hoffacker

Personal details
- Born: August 23, 1926 South Bend, Indiana, U.S.
- Died: May 19, 2011 (aged 84) Scottsdale, Arizona, U.S.
- Education: University of Chicago

Robert Louis Payton (August 23, 1926 – May 19, 2011) was a jazz musician, writer and editor, president of two universities (Hofstra University and C.W. Post College), a State Department official, and ambassador to the African republic of Cameroon. He also served as a founding trustee of Editorial Projects in Education, the organization that helped start The Chronicle of Higher Education. He was the first full-time director of the Center on Philanthropy at Indiana University.

== Administrative career ==
Payton graduated from the University of Chicago. He was a vice chancellor of Washington University in St. Louis and served as special assistant to the Under Secretary of State for Administration in 1966‐67. Payton was editor of the Burlington Herald, the National Real Estate Journal, and the Washington University Magazine. In January 1967, President Lyndon Johnson nominated Payton to be United States Ambassador to Cameroon. He succeed Leland Barrows and began his post in June 1967.

=== C.W. Post College ===
After two years as ambassador, he was then named the Interim President of C.W. Post College on September 9, 1969. His tenure was not without a fair share of mishaps, including salary freezes that were incurred and also the halting of a planned library at the Brooklyn campus. Additionally, a dispute with campus radio station WCWP for allegedly reading pornographic material live on air would culminate in a 45-day sit-in by students. Payton gave the go ahead to reinstate the radio station, but the proposal was ultimately rejected by LIU trustees. Faculty salary was also an issue at Post, as classes were cancelled for 3 hours in March 1973 to discuss such matters. Ultimately, Payton would resign as president of Post, submitting his letter on 27 March and it being effective on 1 August. While he said the dispute was not part of his resignation, he tended to have an uphill battle with himself and the trustees of the university, mainly chancellor Albert Bush-Brown as he was unable to get the trustees to get a pay raise for the faculty during his tenure.

=== Hofstra University ===
Payton was then named the president of Hofstra University and assumed his post in June 1973. After former president and then-chancellor Clifford Lee Lord had gone to the Hudson Institute, chancellors were phased out of the university and Payton had only the board of trustees to deal with. In 1973, the Hofstra Law Review had begun publication, the university launched a charter with Phi Beta Kappa, and the first gay rights organization Hofstra United Gays (HUG) was established. Payton's tenure started with a plan for Hofstra and the Polytechnic Institute of New York to merge their engineering programs, but remain two separate institutional identities. It is unclear if this ever came to fruition, as financial problems would plague the university in 1974. These financial issues had almost resulted in the majority termination of all athletic activities at Hofstra, but Payton had managed to cut only the soccer, track, and golf programs form the university despite a $1.8 million university wide deficit. In 1975, Hofstra began a partnership with the Jewish Theological Seminary of America to offer classes in Judaism, to which Payton responded that it is best for students to "...make each student sensitively aware of a culture other than her or his own". However, with another $1.4 million deficit and a cut of over 111 staff members, trustees had felt that Payton "didn't feel as heavily comfortable with the heavily financial orientation of his position" and thus resigned on June 18, 1976.

== Later career and philanthropy ==
After his resignation from Hofstra, Payton wrote an article in the New York Times stating what plans should be put in action for higher education to survive. Those included possible merger scenarios, fundraising and endowment increasing efforts, facility reallocation, and gaining more research opportunities from government and business partnerships. In 1986 he served as president of the Exxon Education Foundation. After, he returned to Indiana and became a professor of philanthropy and served as the Director of the Center on Philanthropy in 1988–1993 at the Indiana University–Purdue University Indianapolis.

== Awards and honors ==
Payton received numerous honors and awards throughout his career. These include the Council for Advancement and Support of Education's Distinguished Service to Education Award in 1984 University of Chicago's Alumni Medal in 1988, and Independent Sector's John W. Gardner Leadership Award in 2003. Payton has also received numerous honorary degrees from Adelphi University, MacMurray College, Quinnipiac College, Rollins College, and York College of Pennsylvania. The CASE Award for Voluntary Service was named in his honor.

== Personal life ==
Payton's son Mathew died of Hodgkin's disease the same day Payton was announced as Hofstra's next president.

Preceded by James H. Marshall	President of Hofstra University; 1973–1976	Succeeded by James M. Shuart
