= Robert P. Jackson =

American foreign service officer and diplomat

Robert Jackson
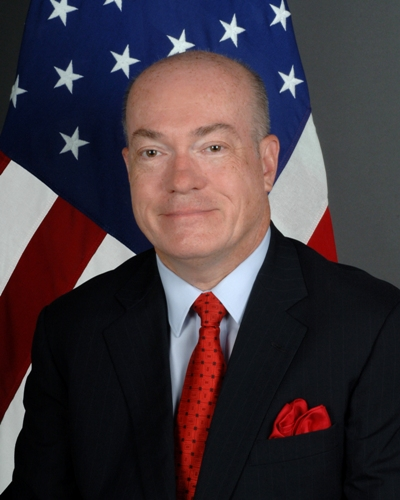

United States Ambassador to Ghana
- In office February 4, 2016 – July 27, 2018
- President: Barack Obama; Donald Trump
- Preceded by: Melinda Tabler-Stone (Acting)
- Succeeded by: Stephanie S. Sullivan

United States Ambassador to Cameroon
- In office October 19, 2010 – October 5, 2013
- President: Barack Obama
- Preceded by: Janet Garvey
- Succeeded by: Michael Hoza

Personal details
- Born: 1956 (age 69–70) Tennessee, U.S.
- Education: Bowdoin College; George Washington University; National Defense University

Robert Porter Jackson (born 1956 in Paris, Tennessee) is a retired American foreign service officer and diplomat. He was a career member of the Senior Foreign Service with the rank of Minister-Counselor.

== Education ==
He received his B.A. from Bowdoin College, his M.A. from The George Washington University's Elliott School of International Affairs and his M.S. from National Defense University.

== Career ==
After earning his B.A., Jackson taught English and American Civilization at the University of Clermont II in Clermont-Ferrand, France. He worked briefly for the U.S. Department of Commerce and the Internal Revenue Service before becoming an English teacher at Institut Montana in Zugerberg, Switzerland.

Jackson began his Foreign Service career in 1982, serving as a Consular and Economic Officer at the U.S. Consulate General in Montreal, Canada. In 1985, he transferred to the U.S. Embassy in Bujumbura, Burundi, where he developed a lifelong passion for Africa.

He was a career member of the Senior Foreign Service with the rank of Minister-Counselor. From 2016 to 2018 he was United States Ambassador to Ghana. From 2013 to 2015 he was Principal Deputy Assistant Secretary of State for African Affairs. He was also the United States Ambassador to Cameroon, where he helped to double U.S. exports and promoted entrepreneurship and biodiversity. Prior to that he was Deputy Chief of Mission and Chargé d'Affaires, a.i., at the U.S. Embassies in Morocco and Senegal. Mr. Jackson has also served as Director of the Office for the Promotion of Human Rights and Democracy; Coordinator of the Entry-Level Officer Training Program; and Country Officer for Botswana, Nigeria and Zimbabwe. His other overseas postings include Côte d'Ivoire, Portugal and Zimbabwe.

== Notes ==
Diplomatic posts
Preceded by Janet Garvey	United States Ambassador to Cameroon; 2010–2013	Succeeded by Michael Hoza
Preceded by Melinda Tabler-Stone; Acting	United States Ambassador to Ghana; 2016–2018	Succeeded by Stephanie S. Sullivan
