= James M. Shuart =

Former President of Hofstra University (1931–2016)

7th President of Hofstra University
- In office June 24, 1976 – October 19, 2001
- Preceded by: Robert L. Payton
- Succeeded by: Stuart Rabinowitz

Personal details
- Born: May 9, 1931 Queens, New York, U.S.
- Died: May 13, 2016 (aged 85)
- Education: Hofstra University; New York University (Ph.D.)

Academic background
- Thesis: Some value-orientations of academic department chairmen: A study of comparative values and administrative effectiveness (1966)

Academic work
- Institutions: Hofstra University

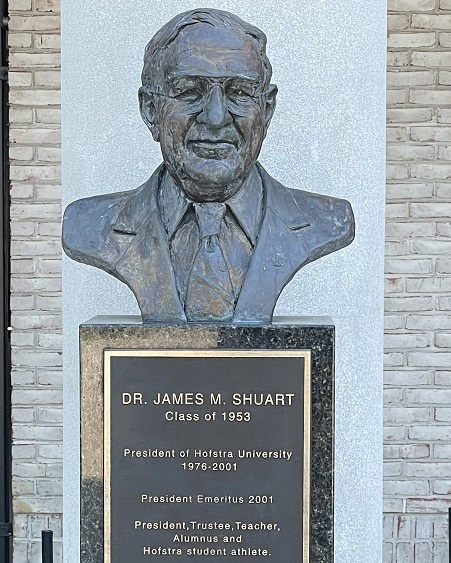
Head bust of James Shuart on Hofstra University campus which stands outside the main athletic complex.

James M. Shuart (May 9, 1931 – May 13, 2016) was the president of Hofstra University from 1976 to 2001. Prior to that he served as a Nassau County, New York official. Also, he served as Assistant President to Hofstra President Clifford Lord during the 1960s in addition to serving as an administrator in the division and then school of education. The school's James M. Shuart Stadium is named after him, and a bust of his likeness stands at the entrance.

He grew up in College Point, Queens graduated from Flushing High School in 1949 and went to Hofstra on a football scholarship. After graduating, he married his college sweetheart, Marjorie Strunk, and was immediately drafted into the Army, where he served as a counterintelligence officer in postwar Korea. After his discharge, he worked as an insurance agent before landing a job in the Hofstra admissions office in 1959.

Shuart died at the age of 85 on May 13, 2016, from cardiovascular disease.

== Education ==
Shuart was a Hofstra alum, with a bachelor's degree in history (1953) and master's in social science (1962). He later earned a doctorate in higher education from New York University in 1966.

== Early career ==
Shuart was appointed as the Nassau County Commissioner of Public Services on December 4, 1970. In that role, he had worked on issues regarding foster children caretakers, segregation within the county, and low income housing among other measures. He served in that role for three years and was later appointed as Nassau County Deputy Executive by County Executive Robert Caso. Shuart returned to Hofstra on October 3, 1975, as he was selected to be the next vice president for administrative services for the university.

Shuart was elected unanimously as the President of Hofstra University on June 23, 1976 by the university's board of trustees, besting three other members of the Hofstra community and replacing former president Robert L. Payton.

In 1977, the university, along with the American Association of University Professors chapter at the institution, had instituted what New York Times writer Roy Silver called "the first labor agreement of its kind in American higher education", an agreement was set to tie instructor and professor increases in salary based on enrollment numbers. Standard increases would be made through the years, but additional increases would be warranted in the event that enrollments increased.

== Related works ==
- James M. Shuart (1966). Some value-orientations of academic department chairmen: a study of comparative values and administrative effectiveness (Thesis). New York University. OCLC 13845904.
- James M. Shuart (1976–2001). Speeches, 1976–2001. Hofstra University. OCLC 47028299.
- Gala for James M. Shuart, 1996. Hofstra University. 1996. OCLC 45435500.

Preceded by Robert L. Payton	President of Hofstra University; 1976–2001	Succeeded by Stuart Rabinowitz
