= Herbert Schmertz =

American public relations executive

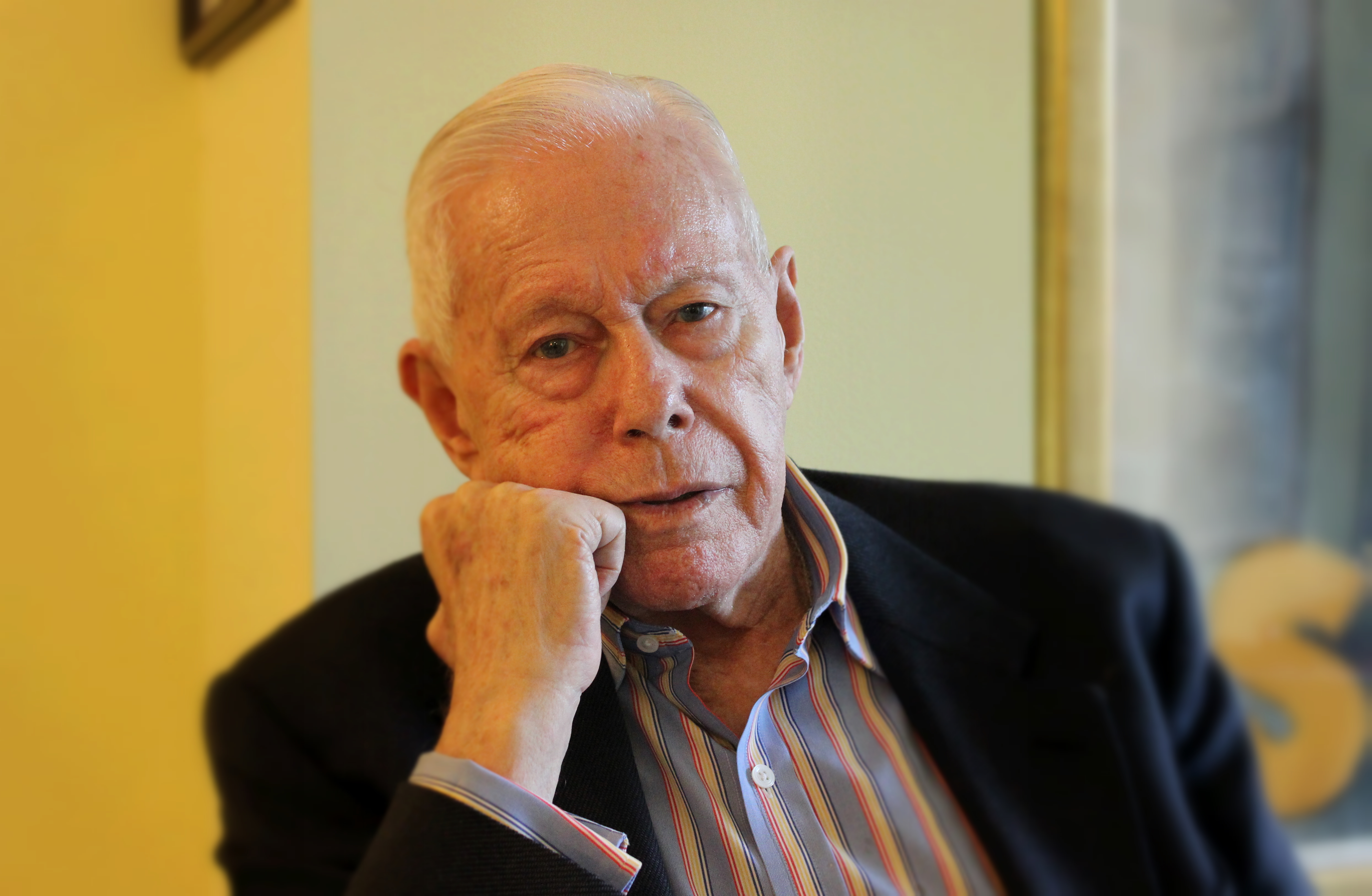
- Herbert Schmertz in 2015
- Born: March 22, 1930; Yonkers, New York
- Died: January 17, 2018 (aged 87); West Palm Beach, Florida
- Education: Union College; Columbia University School of Law
- Children: 5
- Relatives: Eric Schmertz (brother)

Herbert Schmertz (March 22, 1930 – January 17, 2018) was a vice president of public affairs for the Mobil Corporation whose advocacy of sponsoring programs on PBS significantly influenced the relationship between PBS and major corporations.

== Early life ==
Schmertz was born in Yonkers, New York, on March 22, 1930, and grew up in New Rochelle, New York, with his brother, Eric. He received a Bachelor of Arts from Union College in 1952 and a Bachelor of Laws from Columbia University in 1955. For two years, from 1955 to 1957, he worked for the United States Army's intelligence efforts in Washington, D.C. Schmertz further received a Doctor of Law degree from Union in 1977.

== Career ==
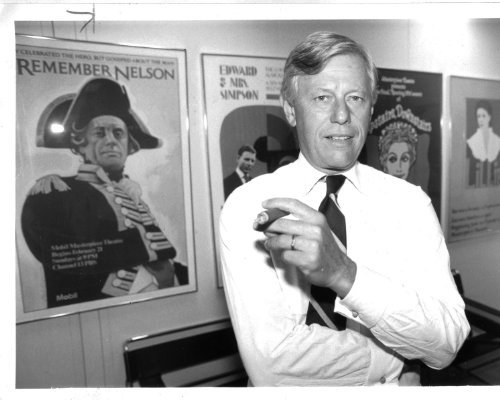
Schmertz circa mid 1980s.

Schmertz was first employed by Mobil as "manager of the corporate labor relations department" in 1966. He was later promoted to "manager of corporate planning coordination" in 1968, then to "vice president for public affairs" in 1969 and "president of Mobil Shipping and Transportation Co." in 1973, before choosing to return to his previous vice president position in 1974. He first joined the Mobil company board after his promotion in 1969 and was also elected to the Mobile Oil company board in 1976.

From the initial joining of Mobil in 1966 to his leaving of the company in 1988, Schmertz oversaw a number of advertisements placed into the Op-Ed section of The New York Times, beginning in 1970. These were used to explain Mobil's position on issues concerning the United States and the company, along with criticism of Mobil's opponents.

In 1970, Stan Calderwood of WGBH-TV approached Mobil to see if the company was interested in funding a production of The Forsyte Saga on PBS. Schmertz supported the idea, as it would allow Mobil to buy 39 hours of television on PBS for a far cheaper price than it would otherwise cost. This continued for further programs and led to the use of what Schmertz called "affinity-of-purpose marketing", where audiences began associating successful television shows with the companies sponsoring them.

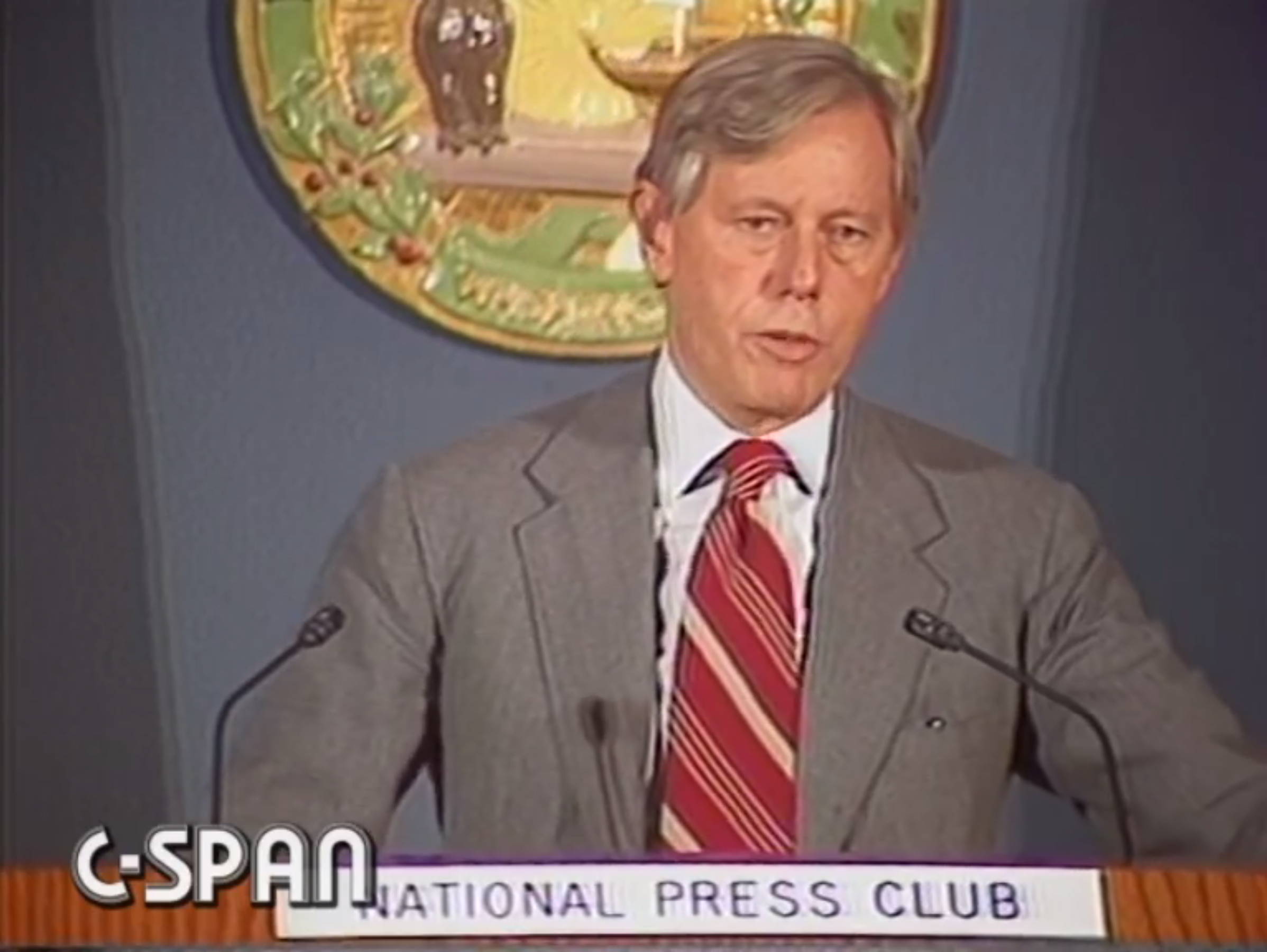
Schmertz and Fred Wertheimer debate the influence of political action committees and campaign finance reform in September 1984.

The sponsorship of Masterpiece Theatre in 1971 was a major public relations success for Mobil, and it allowed Schmertz, on behalf of Mobil as an underwriter for the show, to build relations with various artists and media executives, even those opposed to Mobil's views.

In 1983, former president Ronald Reagan nominated Schmertz to be on the United States Advisory Commission on Public Diplomacy for a term lasting until 1985.

In 1986, Schmertz authored Goodbye to the Low Profile: The Art of Creative Confrontation, a meditation on his experiences with the news media while working for Mobil Oil.

Schmertz began his own consulting business, Schmertz Co., after leaving his Mobil position in 1988. He was hired as a volunteer for Edward Kennedy's 1980 presidential campaign and later worked with Bob Dole's 1988 presidential campaign.

== Personal life ==
Schmertz has five children and six grandchildren. He died on January 17, 2018, in West Palm Beach, Florida.

== See also ==
- Halo effect
