= Janet E. Garvey =

American diplomat (born 1953)

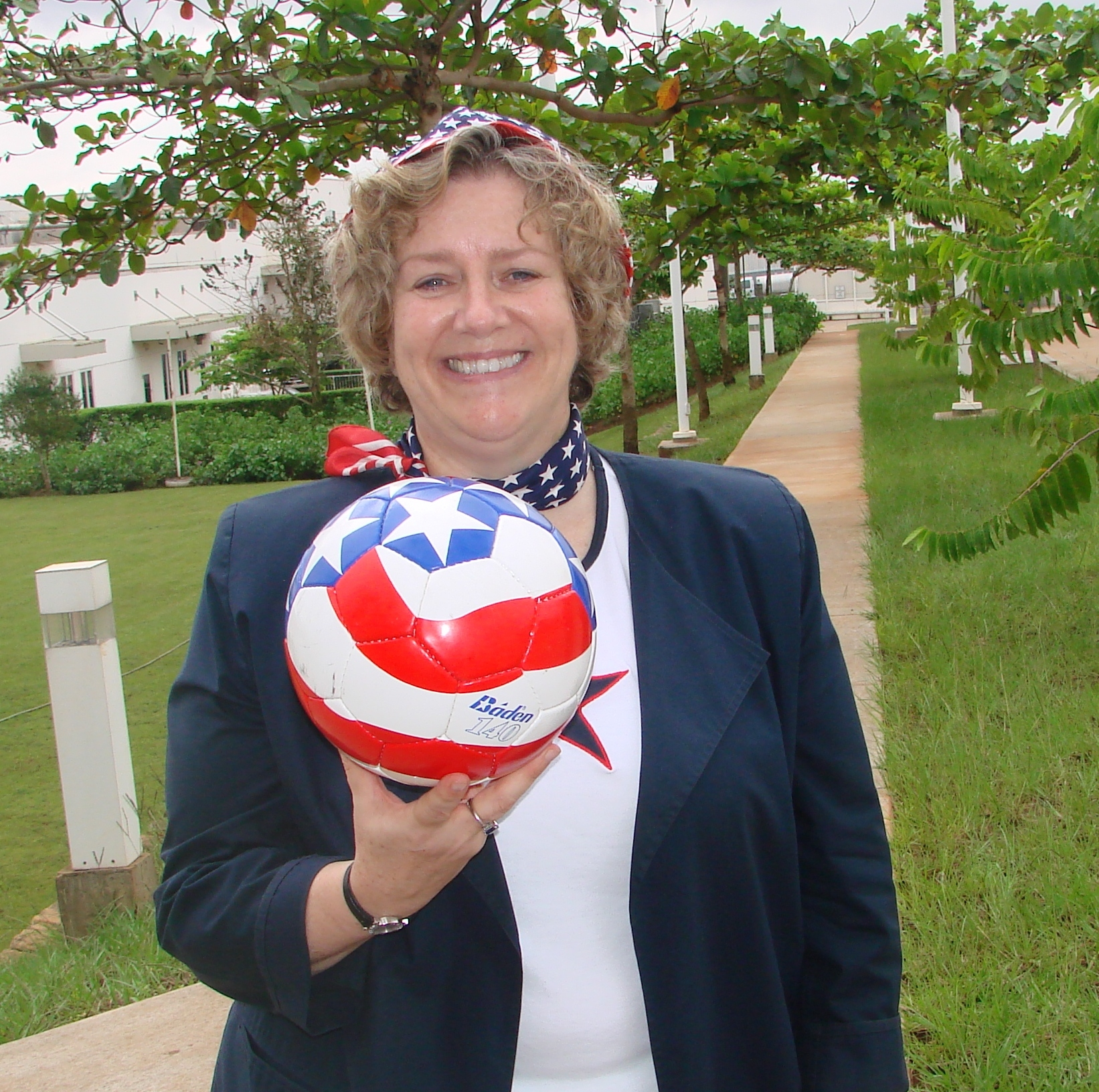

United States Ambassador to Cameroon
- In office November 9, 2007 – August 1, 2010
- Preceded by: R. Niels Marquardt
- Succeeded by: Robert P. Jackson

Personal details
- Born: 1953 (age 72–73) Milton, Massachusetts, U.S.
- Education: Archbishop Williams High School; Northeastern University; Walsh School of Foreign Service; Georgetown University Law Center (JD)
- Profession: Diplomat

Janet E. Garvey (born 1953) is a faculty member at Northeastern University and was a Career Foreign Service Officer who served as the American Ambassador to Cameroon (2007-2010),

Garvey was the associate director for international liaison at the George C. Marshall European Center for Security Studies, deputy coordinator at the Bureau of International Information Programs at the Department of State, and director of the Office of North Central European Affairs at the Bureau of European and Eurasian Affairs at the Department of State.

Under her tenure as Ambassador, Cameroon was still undergoing internal strife. The US “(appeared) to prefer the status quo ... (reflecting) the common U.S. foreign policy dilemma of trying to balance straightforward national security interests with promoting democracy.” Due to concerns, in part about Nigeria, the US had 300 soldiers and a drone base are stationed in northern Cameroon. In 2009, Garvey wrote “It is difficult to say that we have substantially moved the ball on the things that matter most to us” like strengthening democracy.

== Education ==
A native of Milton, Massachusetts, Garvey graduated from Archbishop Williams High School and earned a bachelor's degree from Northeastern University, and her master's and Juris Doctor degrees from Georgetown University School of Foreign Service (MSFS 1979) and Georgetown University Law Center.
