= Pete Kendall =

American football player (born 1973)

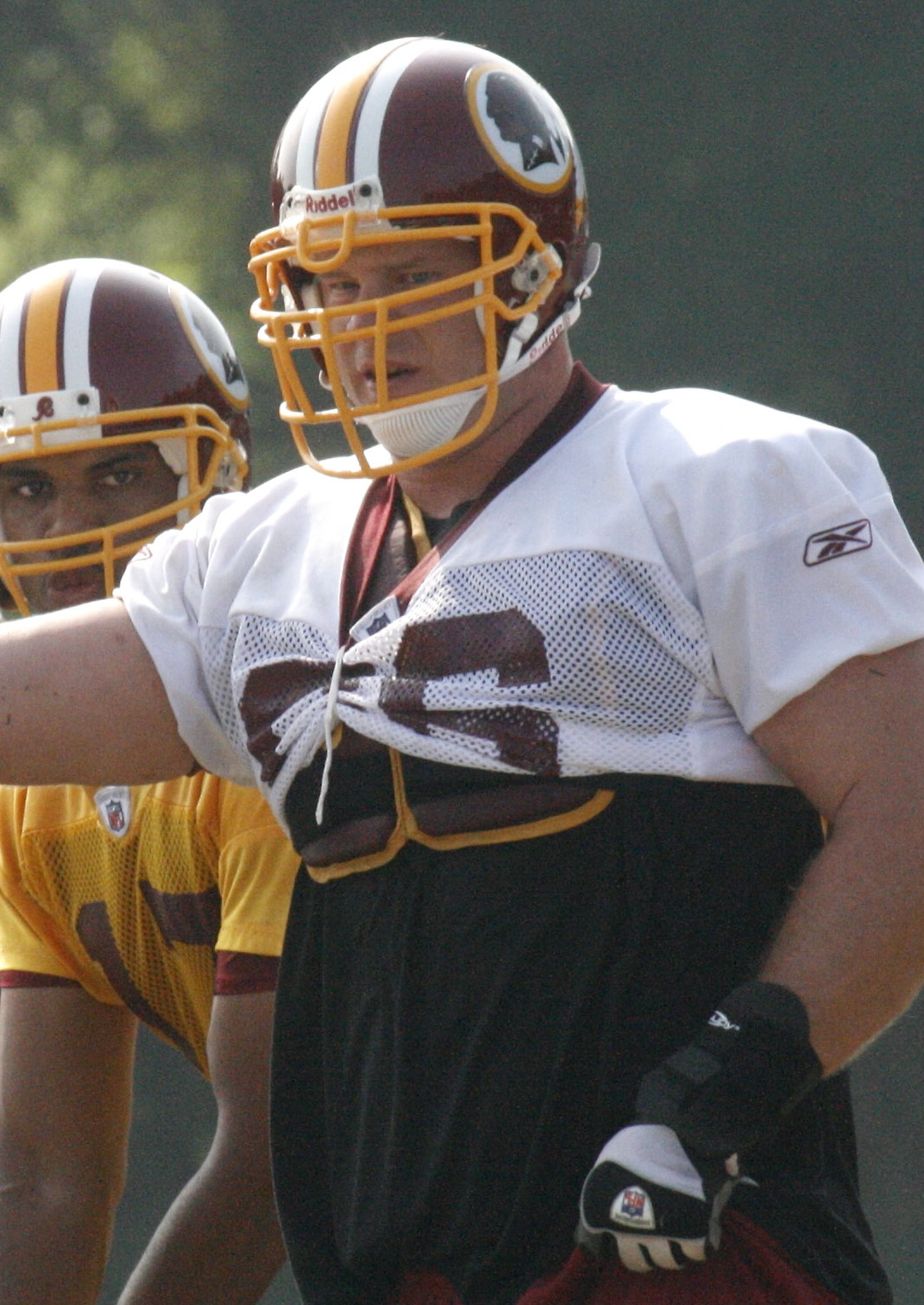

No. 66
- Position: Guard

Personal information
- Born: July 9, 1973 (age 53); Quincy, Massachusetts, U.S.
- Listed height: 6 ft 5 in (1.96 m)
- Listed weight: 292 lb (132 kg)

Career information
- High school: Archbishop Williams (Braintree, Massachusetts)
- College: Boston College
- NFL draft: 1996: 1st round, 21st overall pick

Career history
- Seattle Seahawks (1996–2000); Arizona Cardinals (2001–2003); New York Jets (2004–2006); Washington Redskins (2007–2008)

Career NFL statistics
- Games played: 189
- Games started: 188
- Fumble recoveries: 1
- Stats at Pro Football Reference

Peter Marcus Kendall (born July 9, 1973) is an American former professional football player who was a guard in the National Football League (NFL).

== Early life and college ==
Kendall played High school football at Archbishop Williams High School in Braintree, Massachusetts. He decided to stay in Massachusetts and play college football at Boston College where he was named all-Big East Conference as a junior and senior.

== Professional career ==
He was selected in the 1996 NFL draft in the first round by the Seattle Seahawks with the 21st overall pick. He would later play for the Arizona Cardinals and New York Jets.

In 2007, Kendall became embroiled in a contract dispute with the Jets' front office. Kendall believed the team had reneged on a verbal agreement to raise his base salary for 2007 after he had agreed to restructure his contract the year before. Kendall made his grievances public despite head coach Eric Mangini's instructions not to do so. As a result, Mangini sent Kendall to the rookie dorms and demoted him to second string, further aggravating the situation. On August 23, 2007, Kendall was traded to the Washington Redskins for a conditional draft pick (either a fifth round pick in 2008 or a fourth round pick in 2009, based on playing time). He became a free agent after the 2008 season.

== Retirement ==
In an interview for the New York Jets Kendall stated between the ages of 36 and 37 he began a new career in financial services, accepting a job at a firm working in equity research sales.

Kendall was inducted into Boston College's Varsity Club Hall of Fame in 2010.

== Personal life ==
Kendall's son Drew Kendall played college football at Boston College and was drafted by the Philadelphia Eagles in the 2025 NFL draft.
