= Christopher Lamora =

American diplomat

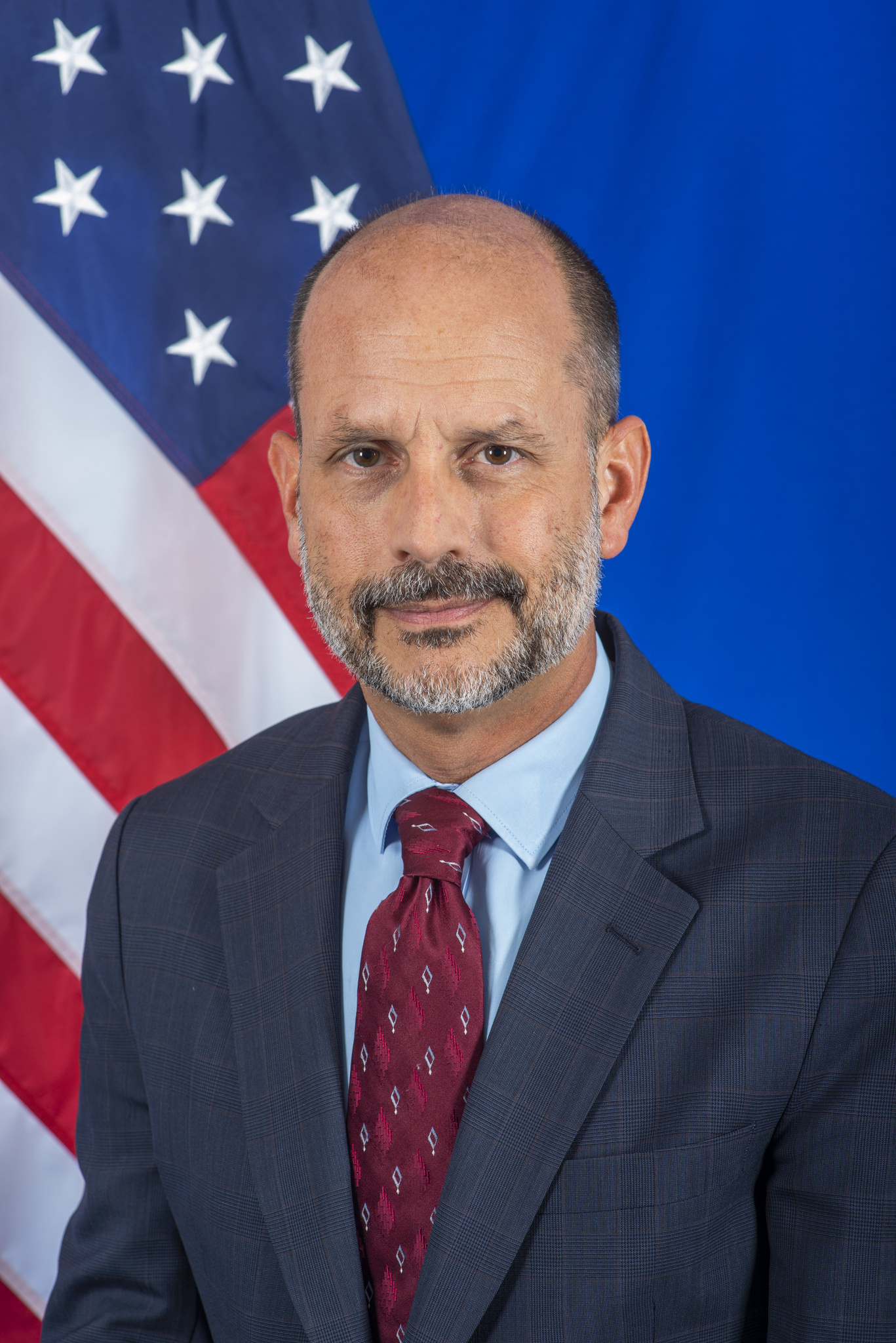

United States Ambassador to Cameroon
- In office March 21, 2022 – January 17, 2026
- President: Joe Biden; Donald Trump
- Preceded by: Peter Barlerin

Personal details
- Born: Christopher John Lamora
- Education: Georgetown University (BS)

Christopher John Lamora is an American diplomat who had served as the United States ambassador to Cameroon.

== Early life and education ==
Lamora earned a Bachelor of Science from the Walsh School of Foreign Service at Georgetown University.

== Career ==
Lamora is a career member of the Senior Foreign Service. He was the Deputy Chief of Mission at the U.S. Embassy in Accra, Ghana prior to his current appointment as the U.S. Ambassador to Cameroon.

His previous work has included being the Acting Deputy Assistant Secretary for Central Africa and African Security Affairs in the Bureau of African Affairs at the State Department and he also served as Director of the Office of Central African Affairs, Deputy Director of the Bureau’s Office of Economic and Regional Affairs, and desk officer for the Democratic Republic of Congo. In addition, he had overseas assignments at the U.S. embassies in Guatemala, the Dominican Republic, Greece and the Central African Republic, and the U.S. Consulate General in Douala, Cameroon. He speaks French, Spanish, and Modern Greek.

=== U.S. ambassador to Cameroon ===
On April 15, 2021, President Joe Biden announced his intent to nominate Lamora to be the next United States Ambassador to Cameroon. On April 19, 2021, his nomination was sent to the Senate. Hearings on his nomination were held before the Senate Foreign Relations Committee on June 9, 2021. The committee reported him favorably on June 24, 2021. On December 18, 2021, he was confirmed by the United States Senate by voice vote. He was sworn into office on February 11, 2022. He arrived in Cameroon on March 5, 2022. He presented his credentials to foreign minister Lejeune Mbella Mbella on March 21, 2022. Lamora is the first out gay man appointed to be ambassador for Cameroon.

== See also ==
- Ambassadors of the United States

Diplomatic posts
Preceded by Peter Barlerin	United States Ambassador to Cameroon; 2022–2026	Vacant
