= Archbishop Williams High School =

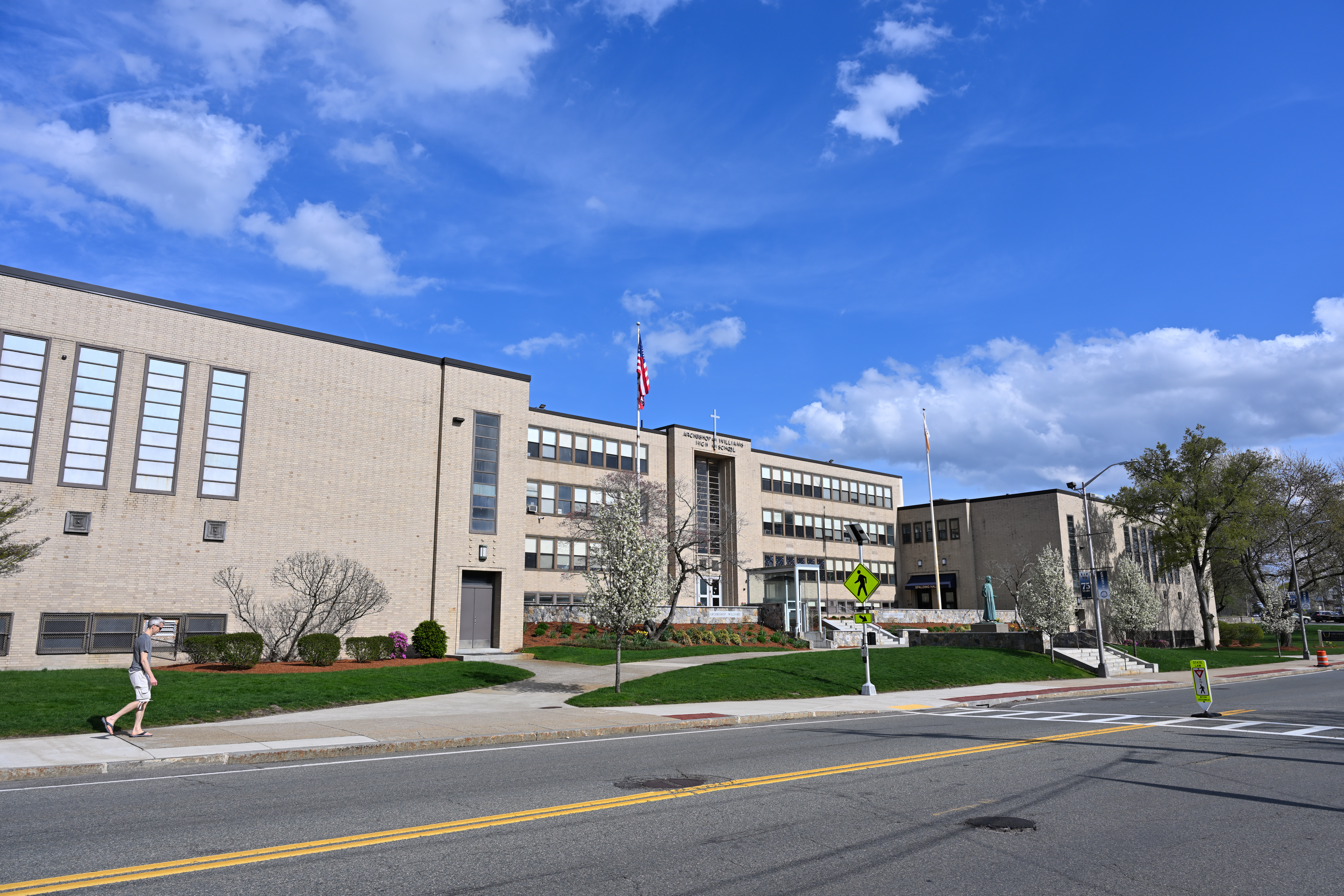

Location
- Braintree, Massachusetts; United States
- Coordinates: 42°13′42″N 71°0′16″W

Information
- Type: Private, Coeducational
- Motto: "The love of Christ drives us on"
- Religious affiliation: Roman Catholic
- Established: 1949
- President: Dennis Duggan
- Principal: Michael Volonnino
- Grades: (7-8) (9-12)
- Enrollment: 765 (2025)
- Average class size: 22
- Student to teacher ratio: 11:1
- Campus: Suburban
- Campus type: Urban
- Colors: Navy Blue and gold
- Slogan: Caritus Christi Urget Nos
- Fight song: " Go Bishops!"
- Athletics conference: Catholic Central League
- Mascot: Bishop
- Nickname: Archie's, Archie Bills, AWHS, Williams, #GoBishops, #rollbills, Bills
- Team name: Bishops
- Rival: Cardinal Spellman High School, Saint Mary’s
- Accreditation: New England Association of Schools and Colleges
- Publication: The Bishops Ledger
- Newspaper: The Mitre
- Yearbook: The Crosier
- Endowment: $889,173
- Tuition: $15,750
- Communities served: 40+
- Website: awhs.org

Archbishop Williams High School is a co-educational Catholic school in Braintree, Massachusetts, United States. It was founded in 1949 by the Sisters of Charity of Nazareth.

Archbishop Williams' school seal, originally that of the founding order of nuns, is the pelican, which was an early Christian symbol of Jesus. The school's motto is Caritas Christi Urget Nos, or " The Love of Christ Drives Us On." Navy Blue and gold are the school's colors.

The school is named after John Joseph Williams, the first Archbishop of Boston. Archbishop Williams High School was dedicated on September 12, 1949, by Cardinal Richard Cushing. In February 2004, the school was renamed Archbishop Williams High School Inc. to reflect its new independent governance status after separating from the Boston Archdiocese in the wake of the child sex abuse scandal.

In the fall of 2014 Archbishop Williams added a 7th & 8th grade program .

In the fall of 2016 Archbishop Williams unveiled its new Al and Rita Nazzaro P’75, ’76, ’78, ’82, ’83 Science Lab located on the top floor of the school as well as the Paul L. Dignan ’55 Athletic Training Center, its new training and workout center located underneath the gym. Along with these changes the school has added the James and Katherine MacDonald P' 72,'74,'79,'82,'85,'87 Amphitheater, dedicated in Spring of 2017 and includes a walkway and amphitheater in accordance with the ongoing campus beautification project.

Tuition is $15,750 for grades 9–12 and $13,400 for grades 7-8 for the 2020 & 2021 school year.

== Noted alumni ==
- Steve Baker – former NHL goalie
- Bob Carrington - former NBA basketball player
- Edward J. Collins, Jr. – government official
- Ralph Cox – hockey player
- Brian Eklund - hockey player
- Jack Garrity – first athletic director at Archbishop Williams High School and teacher for 11 years
- Janet E. Garvey - Northeastern University faculty and former Ambassador to Cameroon
- Matt Glennon – former NHL player
- Beth Harrington – film director / producer
- Pete Kendall – former NFL offensive lineman
- Brian Noonan – former NHL player
- Mike O'Connell – former NHL player
- Don Parsons - former hockey player
- James C. McConville - 40th Chief of Staff of the United States Army
