= Eric Schmertz =

American lawyer

Eric Joseph Schmertz

4th Dean of Hofstra Law
- In office January 1982 – June 1989
- Preceded by: John J. Regan
- Succeeded by: Stuart Rabinowitz

Personal details
- Born: December 24, 1925 The Bronx, New York City, New York
- Died: December 18, 2010 (aged 84) Mount Kisco, New York
- Relatives: Herbert Schmertz (brother)
- Education: New Rochelle High School
- Alma mater: Union College; New York University (JD)
- Occupation: Lawyer, law professor, and labor negotiator

Eric Joseph Schmertz (December 24, 1925 – December 18, 2010) was an American lawyer who specialized in labor negotiation, helping reach agreements between workers and management in many strikes and other threatened union actions in New York City, including actions by the city's taxi drivers and other municipal workers, as well as helping resolve other negotiations elsewhere in the United States. A law professor for many years, he also served as dean of Hofstra University School of Law.

== Personal life ==
Schmertz was born on December 24, 1925, in the Bronx. Raised in suburban New Rochelle, New York, he played baseball at New Rochelle High School and was tendered a contract to play for the Pittsburgh Pirates after being spotted by a scout for the team. Schmertz rejected the offer and enlisted in the United States Navy, where he served in the Pacific Theater during World War II. After completing his military service he completed his undergraduate degree in 1948 at Union College and earned his Juris Doctor degree in 1952 from the New York University School of Law.

Schmertz died six days before his 85th birthday in 2010, at his home in Mount Kisco, New York. He was survived by his second wife, Harriette, as well as by a daughter, three sons and five grandchildren.

== Career ==
When The Rockettes went on strike at Radio City Music Hall in 1967, Schmertz helped negotiate a deal that brought the dancers a pay increases of 15%. A 1969 negotiation he oversaw brought 2,000 striking cab drivers back to work. While negotiating a labor agreement relating to adjusting the schedules of employees of the New York City Fire Department in 1970, Schmertz spent time with a firehouse and joined the firemen on calls to incidents.

The Mayor of New York City Ed Koch refused to reappoint him after he served 15 years as part of the city's negotiating board, saying that Schmertz favored union workers over the needs and concerns of the city. Koch was so bothered by the favoritism he perceived that Schmertz had for union workers, that he said that he had "turned Schmertz into a verb and a noun", so that "If you have been abused, we say you have been Schmertzed. If you get an unwarranted and undeserved payment from the City of New York, you say, 'Thank you Mr. Mayor, for the Schmertz.'"

Schmertz had been a faculty member of Hofstra Law School from the time it was formed in 1970 and was named as the school's dean in 1982. In that role he created a program teaching students about mediation as an alternative to using the court system.

Mayor David Dinkins fired Schmertz in 1990 from his position as labor commissioner after he had reached a deal with the city's teachers unions granting a 5.5% increase, amid criticism from other city officials that the deal was too generous. In the early 1990s, he helped negotiate a deal with striking private sanitation workers in the city, ending a five-day strike that affected garbage pickup at businesses and gave employees represented by the International Brotherhood of Teamsters a three-year deal that included increases of $75 per week.

In 2005, Schmertz was part of an independent committee that oversaw a 10% salary increase as part of a new contract for officers of the New York City Police Department, with Schmertz noting that police officers in surrounding communities were paid more despite having "less duties, less responsibilities and less stress and danger" and stating that he would have approved an even larger increase if he had the opportunity.
