= Michael S. Hoza =

American diplomat (born 1957)

Michael Hoza
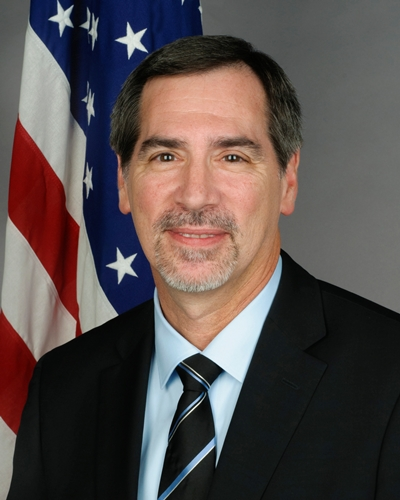

United States Ambassador to Cameroon
- In office August 22, 2014 – September 11, 2017
- President: Barack Obama; Donald Trump
- Preceded by: Robert P. Jackson
- Succeeded by: Peter Barlerin

Personal details
- Born: 1957 (age 68–69) Goldsboro, North Carolina, U.S.
- Education: Georgetown University

Michael Stephen Hoza (born 1957) is an American diplomat. From 2014 to 2017 Hoza served as the United States Ambassador to Cameroon.

Hoza received his Bachelor of Science degree from Georgetown University in 1979. After working with the Washington Post Company in Washington, D.C., for six years Hoza joined the Foreign Service.

== Consular career ==
After joining the State Department in 1985, Hoza was first posted to the U.S. embassy in Abidjan, Ivory Coast as a Regional Budget and Fiscal Officer. In 1987, he was moved to the U.S. consulate in the French West Indies, where he stayed for two years before being moved to Maputo, Mozambique to be an Administrative Officer. In 1991, Hoza was recalled to work with at the Bureau of African Affairs.

Two years later, Hoza was given a post at the U.S. embassy in Asmara, Eritrea before being made Deputy Chief of Mission at the embassy in Mbabane, Swaziland in 1997. He remained in the post for three years before taking a similar job in Kathmandu, Nepal. In 2002, Hoza was made the Human Resources Officer at the U.S. embassy in Paris, France and in 2004 he became the Management Counselor in Madrid, Spain.

Hoza stayed in Madrid until 2007 when he moved to be the Management Counselor and Acting Deputy Chief of Mission in Nairobi, Kenya. In 2010, Hoza moved to be the Management Counselor at the U.S. Embassy in Moscow.
