= South Vietnamese Popular Force =

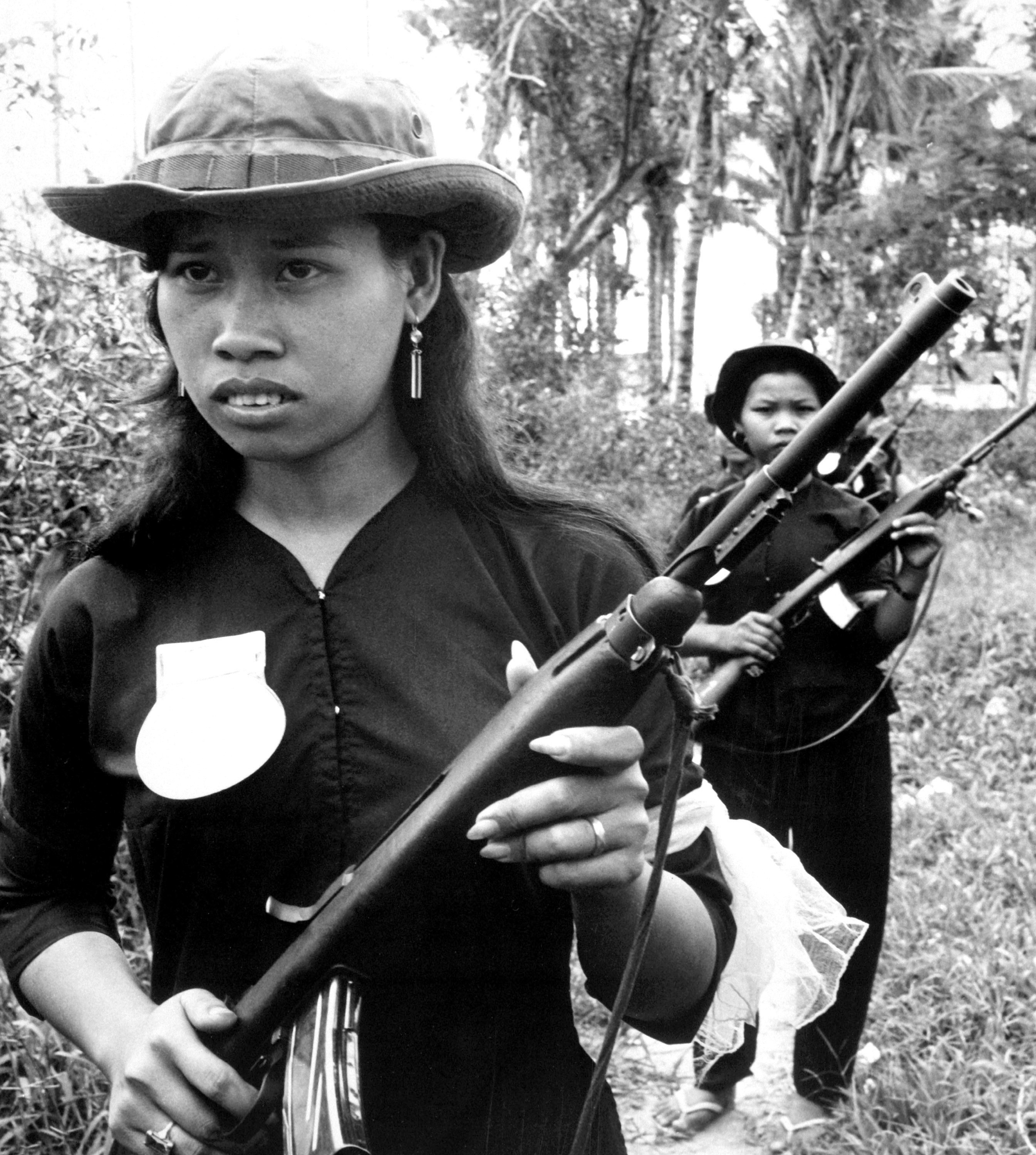
- Female South Vietnamese Popular Force members on patrol in Bến Cát District
- Active: 1955–1975
- Country: South Vietnam
- Branch: Army of the Republic of Vietnam
- Type: Militia
- Size: 227,950 (1972 authorized strength)
- Nickname(s): Ruff-Puffs (used by American Forces)
- Engagements: Vietnam War: Tet Offensive; 1975 Spring Offensive

The South Vietnamese Popular Force (Vietnamese: nghĩa quân, PF) (originally the Self-Defense Corps) was a part-time local militia of the Army of the Republic of Vietnam (ARVN) during the Vietnam War. The South Vietnamese Popular Force mainly protected homes and villages in South Vietnam from attacks by the Viet Cong (VC) and later the People's Army of Vietnam (PAVN).

The Popular Force resembled the Local Force and village-guerrilla level component of the VC, while the Regional Force was a full-time force available for operations within a province. The Popular Force was initially very poorly trained and equipped, but often bore the brunt of PAVN/VC attacks. PF and Regional Force units were responsible for inflicting an estimated 30% of the total PAVN/VC casualties throughout the war, and were much more capable of fulfilling ambush and small-unit movement, reconnaissance and detection roles than larger, slow-moving conventional forces.

== History ==
A survey in May 1957 had revealed that there were about 50,000 men enrolled in the Self-Defense (militia) Corps. Impressive in size only, these forces generally were poorly equipped, ill-trained, and poorly disciplined. The Self-Defense Corps had approximately two weapons for every three corpsmen. Those weapons were mostly obsolete French rifles for which the ammunition was limited and so old that only about one round in seven was likely actually to fire. A survey by American police experts found that corpsmen usually came from the lower levels of village society, had scant education and received little or no training. The experts estimated that "the capability of the SDC [Self-Defense Corps] to withstand assaults by armed and organized [VC] units is virtually null." The advisory group believed that in most areas of the South the Self-Defense Corps was thoroughly infiltrated by the Communists; in some provinces it even reportedly "covers up more information than it furnishes".

A static, part-time, militia force, the Self-Defense Corps was intended to protect villages "against the subversive activities of dissident elements." The Corps was so notoriously ineffective and so heavily infiltrated by Communists that many members of the country team, including United States Ambassador to South Vietnam Elbridge Durbrow, favored dropping it entirely from the U.S. aid program. Late 1957 produced a lively debate on the future of the Corps. Military Assistance Advisory Group (MAAG) commander General Samuel Tankersley Williams argued forcefully for U.S. support of a Self-Defense Corps of at least 43,500 men. With strong support from Admiral Harry D. Felt CINCPAC, he was eventually able to obtain country team approval for funding an expanded Self-Defense Corps if a "clearly defined chain of command" could be established for the corps, an effective training program could be undertaken and VC infiltrators could be weeded out through fingerprinting and improved background checks. MAAG would be the agency advising the Corps.

Despite continued bankrolling, the Self-Defense Corps over the next three years improved little. In late 1958, General Williams complained to the South Vietnamese Defense Ministry that training of the Self-Defense Corps could proceed smoothly only if numerous "faults which handicap training" could be corrected. Those included inadequate firing ranges, deficient training aids, unserviceable ammunition, and inadequate housing. He urged officials of the Self-Defense Corps to borrow training aids and equipment from the ARVN and offered to make available American advisers to assist training camp commanders. Yet the officials apparently failed to avail themselves of those opportunities.

Following the 1963 South Vietnamese coup the ARVN reorganised the Civil Guard into the Regional Forces and the Self-Defense Corps was combined with several other paramilitary organizations to become the Popular Forces. Collectively, they became the Territorial Forces-better known in American circles by the combined initials RF/PF, or by the term "Ruff-Puff". Subsequently the two were placed under the Joint General Staff (JGS) and given a single chain of command, but remained separate from the regular ARVN until 1970. In general, province chiefs controlled Regional Forces companies, and district and village chiefs directed Popular Forces platoons. Normally the province chief was also the sector, or military, commander of his province, and the district chief was the subsector commander. For military affairs, both reported to the local division commander.

In 1965 COMUSMACV General William Westmoreland planned to expand the Popular Force by a further 10,825 to release more of the ARVN regular force for offensive operations.In mid-June 1965 the number of authorized Popular Forces rifle platoons stood at 3,892. Desertion within the Self-Defense Corps/Popular Force was a continual problem with the following rates: 11,957 in 1962; 18,540 in 1963, 36,608 in 1964 and 49,224 in 1965. The number of Popular Forces declined during 1965, with a net loss of 25,000 from casualties and desertions, leaving them with about 135,000 troops out of an authorized 185,000 at the end of the year. Their losses were the highest in the armed forces, and recruiting had become a major problem. Earlier in the year the JGS had prohibited the Popular Forces from taking 20-25 year olds and, in July, had widened the ban to the 17–30 age bracket. As intended, the prohibitions improved regular ARVN recruiting at the expense of the territorials and were halted at the end of the year. Other difficulties included competition for recruits with the National Police. Nevertheless, Westmoreland felt that these problems were manageable and ordered an increase of some 200,000 in the Popular Forces strength during 1966.

From 1965 to 1971 the United States Marines Corps in I Corps instituted the Combined Action Program which involved placing a 15 man Marine rifle squad, augmented by a U.S. Navy Corpsman and strengthened by a Popular Force platoon, in or adjacent to a rural hamlet. At its peak in January 1970 there were 114 Combined Action Platoons.

During 1966 and 1967, if losses could be held down, Popular Forces strength was to reach 200,000 as soon as possible. As in 1965, Westmoreland felt that the JGS could easily and cheaply expand the territorials because they required little training and drew from a much broader pool of manpower. During the first six months of 1966 the monthly desertion rate (desertions per 1,000 troops assigned) of the Popular Forces was 27.0. By June 1966 high desertion rates and recruiting shortfalls in the territorial components finally led Westmoreland to freeze the authorized force structure and to make drastic reductions in his projected increases. During the course of the year he trimmed the proposed strength of the Popular Forces from 200,000 to 147,440. In 1966 the JGS transformed the semiautonomous Territorial Forces command into a directorate of the JGS and established separate staff sections for Territorial Forces in each Corps headquarters to supervise province and district security forces, further strengthening ARVN control.

In March 1967 at Westmoreland's suggestion, JGS Chairman General Cao Văn Viên activated 333 more Popular Forces platoons. In July Westmoreland proposed an expansion of 35,000 to the Popular Forces, to provide men for new rifle companies and platoons and for province and district military staffs, territorial support companies, and territorial pipeline strength (personnel in training, hospitalized, on leave, and so forth). Even this, Westmoreland felt, was insufficient, but he believed that it was the most that South Vietnam's recruiting and training systems could handle. By October 1967 the Popular Forces consisted of 242 intelligence squads (1 per district) and 4,121 rifle platoons (still armed primarily with carbines and old Browning automatic rifles). Of this force, MACV estimated that only 754 Popular Forces platoons were providing direct support for the revolutionary development effort. The remaining territorial units were presumably either in the process of formation, in training, defending bases and installations, outposting roads, or conducting conventional combat operations.

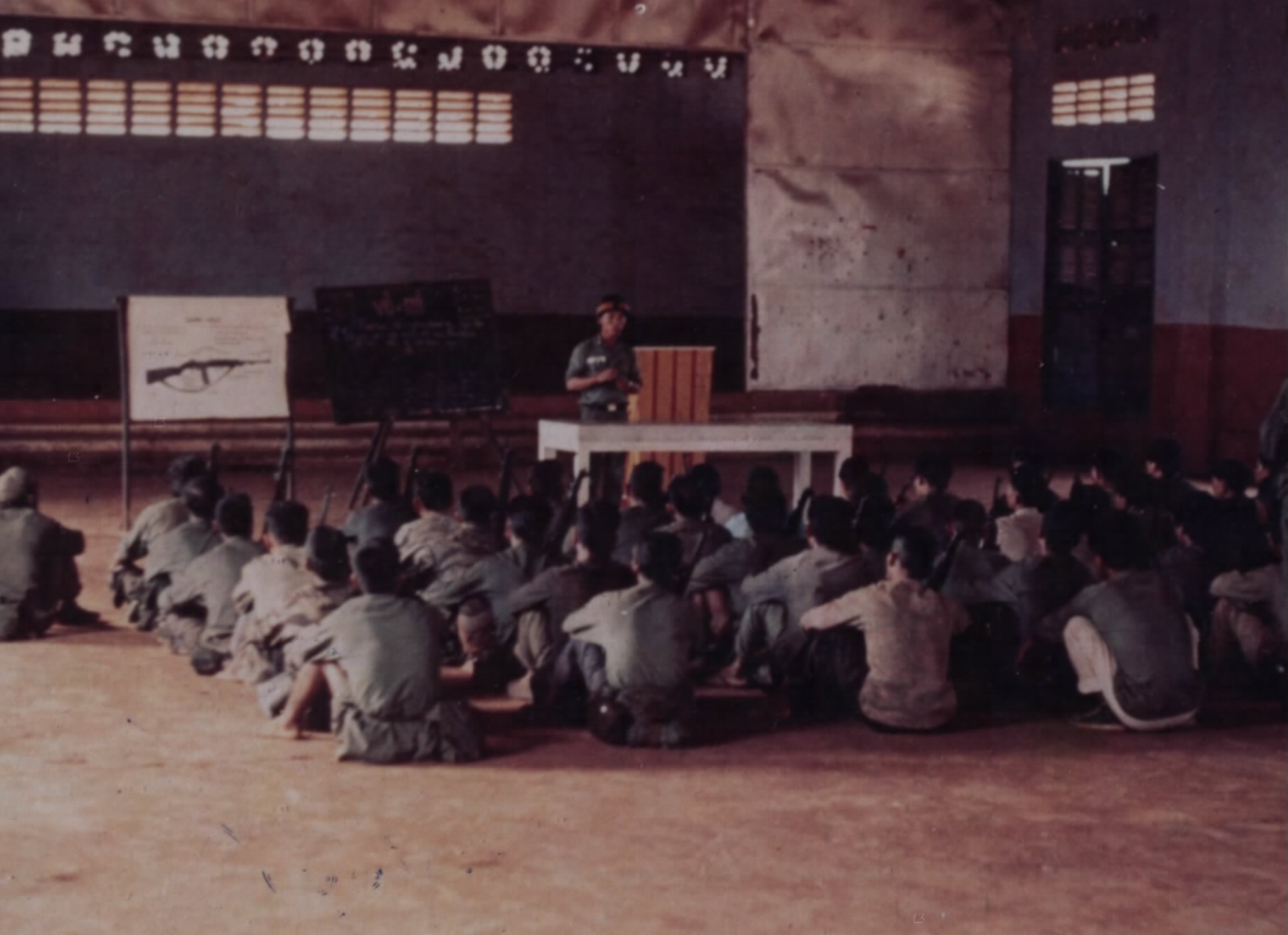
Carbine training, Popular Forces Training Center, Pleiku, 1 July 1970

With an average of 20 Regional Forces companies and 100 Popular Forces platoons in each province, the province and district military staffs were swamped with staff work, and MACV considered establishing some sort of intermediate tactical command (for example, a territorial group or battalion headquarters) to ease their growing control problems. The province Territorial Forces adviser, normally an Army captain, and the small district advisory teams (still about four men each) assisted the territorial units as best they could. Smaller advisory cells also operated with Popular Forces training centers, the territorial logistics companies, and the smaller specialized units, but the Territorial Forces advisory effort was too small to have much of an impact, and advisers spent most of their time working behind the scenes to make the weak territorial command, administration and supply system work. The regular ARVN continued to support the territorials with some training and supplies, but showed little interest in their deployment and operations.

Between July and December 1967, the JGS activated 446 Popular Forces platoons. In late February 1968 in the wake of the Tet Offensive Westmoreland requested 268,000 M16 rifles and 11,200 M79 grenade launchers for the territorials, who with their Korean War era small arms were outgunned by the PAVN/VC. In 1968 the JGS supervised training for 588 new and 656 existing Popular Forces platoons. The JGS also reduced the number of Popular Forces training camps from 37 to 19 and placed the camps under the Central Training Command.

In 1969 the JGS proposed expanding the Popular Forces by 100,000 for a total of 2,869 platoons, thus freeing more regular forces from their area security missions.

In mid-1972 the paper strength of the Popular Forces was 227,950 with command exercised by each Corps headquarters. The Popular Forces accounted for US$99.8m of a total defense budget of US$2,228m or approximately 4.5%.
