= Leland Barrows =

American diplomat

Leland Judd Barrows

1st United States Ambassador to Cameroon
- In office June 1960 – 6 September 1966
- President: Dwight D. Eisenhower; John F. Kennedy
- Preceded by: Boland More (ad interim)
- Succeeded by: Robert L. Payton

1st United States Ambassador to Togo
- In office August 1960 – 27 June 1961
- President: Dwight D. Eisenhower; John F. Kennedy
- Preceded by: none, office created
- Succeeded by: Leon B. Poullada

Personal details
- Born: October 27, 1906 Hutchinson, Kansas, U.S.
- Died: March 3, 1988 (aged 81)
- Spouse: Mabel Irene Conley
- Profession: Diplomat

Leland Judd Barrows (October 27, 1906 – March 3, 1988) was an American ambassador to Cameroon and Togo. He was born in Hutchinson, Kansas. He married Mabel Irene Conley on March 21, 1935.

He served various diplomatic positions including a member of the Council on Foreign Relations; Phi Beta Kappa and foreign service officer; along with his ambassadorships; as well as a Newspaper reporter and radio broadcaster outside of the State Department. He died in 1988.

His parents were Eugene Barrows and Florence Emma (Judd) Barrows.

== Education ==
He graduated from the University of Kansas with a master's degree in political science.

== Career ==
Narrows has had a varied career in government. While Harry Truman was president, he served in the Office of Price Administration, the Federal Public Housing Authority, and the Department of State, 1944–48; Executive Assistant to the Special, Representative in Europe, Economic Cooperation Administration, 1948–53; Director, Mission to Greece, Foreign Operations Agency, 1952–54; and Mission to Vietnam, 1949–1958.

== Personal life ==
Barrows was married to Irene Conley Barrows, with whom he had two children. His son, Leland C. Barrows, was a graduate of Columbia University and served as a history professor at Voorhees College.

Diplomatic posts
Preceded by none	United States Ambassador to Togo; 1960–1961	Succeeded by Leon B. Poullada
Preceded by none	United States Ambassador to Cameroon; 1960–1966	Succeeded by Robert L. Payton
