= George McDade Staples =

American diplomat

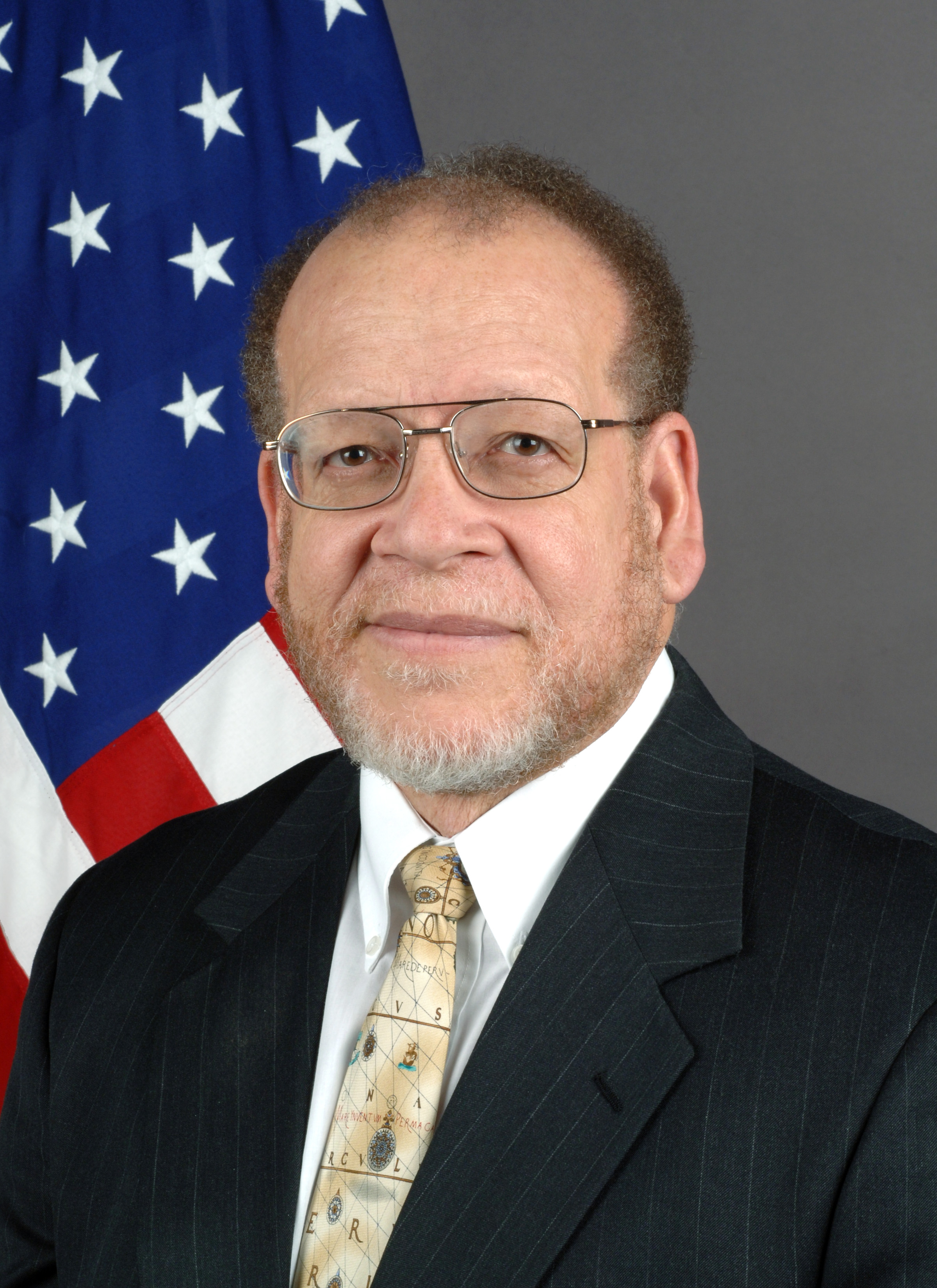

26th Director General of the Foreign Service
- In office May 25, 2006 – June 27, 2007
- Preceded by: W. Robert Pearson
- Succeeded by: Harry K. Thomas Jr.

Personal details
- Born: December 7, 1947 (age 77); Knoxville, Tennessee
- Spouse: Jo Ann (nee Fuson)
- Children: 1
- Education: University of Southern California (BA); Central Michigan University (MA)

George McDade Staples (born December 7, 1947 Knoxville, Tennessee) is an American career Foreign Service Officer who served as ambassador to Rwanda (1999-2001), ambassador to Cameroon and Equatorial Guinea (2001-2004) and Director General of the Foreign Service (May 25, 2006-June 27, 2007), Director of the Bureau of Human Resources at the U.S. Department of State and Political Advisor to the Supreme Allied Commander Europe (SACEUR) at NATO in Belgium. He now holds the rank of Career Minister.

When his parents separated, he moved with his mother and sister to Los Angeles and graduated from Susan Miller Dorsey High School. Staples received his B.A. in Political Science from the University of Southern California (Major:Political Science; member of the Air Force ROTC) and an M.A. in Business from Central Michigan University. He and his wife, Jo Ann Fuson Staples, have one daughter, Catherine and consider their permanent home to be in Pineville, Kentucky.
