= Herbert Spiro =

American politician

Herbert John Spiro
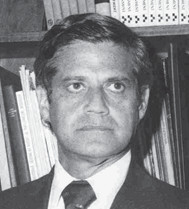
- State Department photo of Spiro

United States Ambassador to Cameroon
- In office September 1, 1975 – May 7, 1977
- President: Gerald Ford
- Preceded by: C. Robert Moore
- Succeeded by: Mabel M. Smythe

United States Ambassador to Equatorial Guinea
- In office September 1, 1975 – March 14, 1976 (declared persona non grata)
- Preceded by: C. Robert Moore
- Succeeded by: Post vacant until December 1979

Personal details
- Born: September 7, 1924 Hamburg, Germany
- Died: April 6, 2010 (aged 85) San Antonio, Texas, United States
- Citizenship: United States (1944–2010)
- Party: Republican
- Education: Harvard University
- Occupation: Political scientist

Military service
- Branch/service: United States Army
- Years of service: 1944–1946
- Rank: Master sergeant
- Unit: 11th Armored Division

Herbert John Spiro (September 7, 1924 – April 6, 2010) was an American political scientist and diplomat. Born in Hamburg, Germany, where he attended the Wilhelm-Gymnasium, he and his family emigrated to the United States in 1938, fleeing Nazi persecution. He served with the United States Army in World War II. His training at Camp Ritchie places him among the list of over 20,000 Ritchie Boys. Afterwards received bachelor's, master's, and doctoral degrees from Harvard University. The author of thirteen books on politics and government, he taught at Amherst College and the University of Pennsylvania. During the Ford administration, he served as United States Ambassador to Cameroon and to Equatorial Guinea, though the latter country declared him persona non grata. He later returned to academia as a professor at the Free University of Berlin. In the early 1990s, he ran for state and then national office as a Republican from Texas, but was not elected.

== Early life ==
Spiro was born in Hamburg, Germany to Jewish parents. His family name is a corruption of Speyer, a town in the Rhineland which once had a significant Jewish community, but he reminisced that in the U.S. it often led people to mistake him for a Greek American. His father worked for a distribution firm. He attended the Wilhelm-Gymnasium. Despite the increasing Nazification of Germany, he states that in liberal Hamburg he experienced no discrimination whatsoever until after Kristallnacht. His family emigrated from Germany just a month later, in December 1938; they passed through New York where their relatives had earlier fled, before settling in San Antonio, Texas. There, Spiro attended Brackenridge High School, and went on to San Antonio Junior College. In a news interview a few years after his arrival, he expressed his disappointment at the relative absence of "wild west heroes" and American Indians in Texas, contrary to the image of the state that he had formed from the Western fiction popular in his native Germany.

Formally an enemy alien, Spiro was not subject to the draft, but after naturalizing in 1944 he volunteered for a military intelligence position. He served with the 11th Armored Division and received the Bronze Star Medal with oak leaf cluster. He spent 1945 and 1946 as an administrative assistant to the United States Department of War, stationed in Vienna.

== Early academic career ==
After returning to the U.S., Spiro entered Harvard University. He stated that he had originally wanted to attend the University of Texas at Austin, but his mother encouraged him to apply to Harvard instead after hearing that a distant cousin had also been accepted. There, he wrote his senior honors thesis on Marxist critiques of democracy, with William Yandell Elliott as his advisor. He received his master's degree in 1950 and his Ph.D. in 1953, with a doctoral dissertation on accountability in government. He spent the following year in his native Germany as a Fulbright Fellow, and then returned to Harvard in 1954, where he continued as an instructor until 1957. He got engaged to Elizabeth Anna Petersen of Radcliffe College, the daughter of Howard C. Petersen, in February 1958. He received a Guggenheim Fellowship in political science in 1959, and lived in Rhodesia and the Central African Republic for the next year.

In 1961, Spiro moved from Harvard to Amherst College, where he was Associate Professor of Political Science until 1965. Afterwards he joined the University of Pennsylvania as Professor of Political Science, where he remained until 1970. He then joined the Department of State as a member of the Policy Planning Staff.

== As ambassador to Cameroon and Equatorial Guinea ==
In July 1975, President Gerald Ford nominated Spiro to succeed C. Robert Moore as United States Ambassador to Cameroon, with concurrent accreditation to Equatorial Guinea. His wife and younger son Alexander accompanied him to Cameroon, while his older son Peter boarded at St. Albans School and visited Cameroon on his summer holidays.

Spiro's accreditation to Equatorial Guinea lasted only about half a year, however, as the country declared him persona non grata in March 1976. The United States had closed its embassy in Malabo in 1971 after one American stationed there murdered another, but still maintained diplomatic relations. Spiro and Consul William C. Mithoefer Jr. had nearly finished one of their regular visits to Equatorial Guinea when Equatoguinean Deputy Protocol Director Santiago Nchama presented them with a letter accusing the U.S. government of engaging in subversive activities in the country and complaining about U.S. foreign and domestic policy, including the Vietnam War and U.S. nuclear weapons. A few days later, Equatorial Guinea's foreign ministry sent a telegram to the State Department announcing that the two U.S. diplomats were barred from returning to the country. His posting in Cameroon lasted until May 1977, when he was succeeded by Mabel M. Smythe, the first woman in the post.

== Electoral politics and later life ==
Spiro taught at Free University of Berlin's John F. Kennedy-Institute for North American Studies from 1980 to 1989. After returning to Texas, he ran for the U.S. House of Representatives in 1992 and in 1994, and for the U.S. Senate in the 1993 special election, but failed to be elected. His son Alexander married Vanessa Daryl Green of Potomac, Maryland at the Metropolitan Club of the City of Washington in May 1993; DC Circuit judge Laurence Silberman performed the ceremony. He died in San Antonio in 2010, and was buried at the Fort Sam Houston National Cemetery. He was survived by his sons Peter Spiro and Alexander Spiro, his ex-wife Elizabeth Spiro Clark, and four grandchildren.

== Works ==
- The Marxian criticism of democracy. Thesis (A.B., Honors). Harvard University. 1949.
- A theory of responsibility in government. Thesis (Ph.D.). Harvard University. 1953. OCLC 76999601.
- The politics of German codetermination. Harvard University Press. 1958. OCLC 502258268. Reviewed by Henry L. Roberts.
- Government by constitution: the political systems of democracy. New York: Random House. 1959. OCLC 1314566.
- Politics in Africa: Prospects south of the Sahara. Englewood Cliffs, New Jersey: Prentice-Hall. 1962. OCLC 504215790. Reviewed by John Hughes and Thomas R. Adam.
- Africa: the primacy of politics. New York: Random House. 1967. OCLC 245880324.
- Patterns of African development: five comparisons. Englewood Cliffs, New Jersey: Prentice-Hall. 1967. OCLC 781487196. Reviewed by Charles Andrain and Stanley Diamond.
- Responsibility in government: theory and practice. New York: Van Nostrand Reinhold. 1969. OCLC 780454306.
- The dialectic of representation, 1619 to 1969. Virginia: Jamestown Foundation. 1969. ISBN 9780813902722. OCLC 16798.
- Politics as the master science: from Plato to Mao. New York: Harper & Row. 1970. OCLC 832438731.

== Sources ==
- Kennedy, Charles Stuart (1994-04-25). "Ambassador Herbert John Spiro". Foreign Affairs Oral History Project (PDF). The Association for Diplomatic Studies and Training. Archived from the original (PDF) on October 7, 2016.

Diplomatic posts
Preceded by C. Robert Moore	United States Ambassador to Equatorial Guinea; 1975	Succeeded by Mabel Murphy Smythe
Preceded by C. Robert Moore	United States Ambassador to Cameroon; 1975–1977	Succeeded by Mabel M. Smythe
