= Howard C. Petersen =

American lawyer (1910–1995)

Howard Charles Petersen (May 7, 1910 – December 28, 1995) was an American government official and banker. He was the United States Assistant Secretary of War from 1945 to 1947.

== Education and early career ==
Petersen was born in East Chicago, Indiana. He graduated from DePauw University in 1930 and the University of Michigan Law School in 1933. From 1933 to 1941, Petersen was an associate in the New York law firm Cravath, deGersdorff, Swaine & Wood (the predecessor firm to Cravath, Swaine & Moore).

While at the Cravath firm, Petersen was introduced to Grenville Clark, through which connection he came to be a principal drafter of the Selective Training and Service Act of 1940. In 1944 Petersen served as Executive Assistant to the Undersecretary of War. In December 1945, Petersen was appointed the Assistant Secretary of War by President Harry S. Truman, a position he held until August 1947. He was the last person to hold that title, since the Department of War became part of the new Department of Defense in 1947.

He worked on the economic recovery of occupied Germany and the Western Allies and supervised U.S. military occupational activities in Germany, Japan, Korea, Austria, and Italy. One of his significant contributions was to help prevent famine in Europe by laying the groundwork for the Marshall Plan.

== After World War II ==
Petersen joined Fidelity-Philadelphia Trust Company in 1947 as executive vice president and went on to serve as the bank's president (1950–66), CEO (1966–75) and chairman (1966–78).

Meanwhile, from 1961 to 1963, Petersen served as Special Assistant to President John F. Kennedy for International Trade Policy, in which he managed Kennedy's controversial campaign for a new foreign trade policy. His main task was to assist with the passage of the Trade Expansion Act of 1962, and he also negotiated the conclusion of the 1960-62 General Agreement on Tariffs and Trade (GATT) negotiations with the European Economic Community.

== Other activities ==
In addition, Petersen served as a Director of the Panama Canal Corporation, and a trustee of the Carnegie Endowment for International Peace.

Petersen was chairman of the boards of the Institute for Advanced Study in Princeton, New Jersey, the University of Pennsylvania Museum, and the Marshall Foundation, and chairman and advisory committee member of Export-Import Bank. He was also a member of the Century Association, the American Philosophical Society, and the Council on Foreign Relations.

== Personal life ==
In 1936, Petersen married Elizabeth Anna Watts of Princeton, Indiana, with whom he had two children: Elizabeth Anna and Howard Jr. Elizabeth married then-Harvard instructor Herbert Spiro in June 1958. Petersen was survived by his daughter and two grandchildren, Peter Spiro and Alexander Spiro.
