= Leland B. Morris =

American diplomat

1st United States Ambassador to Iran
- In office August 21, 1944 – May 20, 1945
- President: Franklin D. Roosevelt; Harry S. Truman
- Preceded by: Louis G. Dreyfus, Jr. (as Minister)
- Succeeded by: Wallace Murray

2nd United States Ambassador to Iceland
- In office October 7, 1942 – May 10, 1944
- President: Franklin D. Roosevelt
- Preceded by: Lincoln MacVeagh
- Succeeded by: Louis G. Dreyfus, Jr.

United States Ambassador to Germany
- Acting, as chargé d'affaires
- In office October 1940 – December 11, 1941
- President: Franklin D. Roosevelt
- Preceded by: • Hugh R. Wilson • Alexander Comstock Kirk (Acting)
- Succeeded by: James B. Conant (1955)

Personal details
- Born: Leland Burnette Morris; February 7, 1886 Fort Clark, Texas, U.S.
- Died: July 2, 1950 (aged 64) Washington, D.C., U.S.
- Occupation: Diplomat

Leland Burnette Morris (February 7, 1886 – July 2, 1950) was an American diplomat. He was the first United States Ambassador to Iran, serving that post from 1944 to 1945. Earlier he was United States Ambassador to Iceland from 1942. Morris served many other diplomatic posts including American Consul General in Jerusalem in 1936, American Consul General in Vienna from 1938 to 1940 after the German annexation of Austria and the American chargé d'affaires in Germany during the outbreak of official American involvement in World War II.

Morris was a native of Fort Clark, Texas. His mother was Susan Frances (née Reece) Morris and his father was Louis Thompson Morris, a colonel in the United States Army.

During his post in Vienna, Morris is credited by the Jewish-Austrian author Felix Salten for ensuring his and his family's protection from persecution by Nazi authorities. Salten and his wife Ottilie Metzl were able to emigrate to Switzerland due to their daughter Anna-Katharina having married a Swiss man.

== Service in Germany during World War II ==
Morris became the American Chargé d'affaires in Germany in October 1940. Prior to the Japanese attack on Pearl Harbor on December 7, 1941, the United States was officially neutral and retained a diplomatic corps in Berlin. This included diplomat George Kennan. Morris, serving as Chargé d'Affaires, was the highest-ranking American diplomat in Germany at the time (the last United States Ambassador, Hugh R. Wilson, was recalled in 1938 in protest of Kristallnacht). On December 11, after the Pearl Harbor attack, German Foreign Minister Joachim von Ribbentrop summoned Morris to his office and read to Morris Germany's formal declaration of war and addressed him by accusing the United States of violations of neutrality and other acts of war. According to Kennan, after reading the declaration Ribbentrop screamed at Morris, "Ihr Präsident hat diesen Krieg gewollt; jetzt hat er ihn" ("Your President has wanted this war, now he has it"), turned on his heels and left the room. Official diplomatic relations between the United States and Germany thus ended.

On December 14, most of the American diplomatic corps still in Germany, including Morris, Kennan, and Associated Press journalist Louis P. Lochner were detained by German authorities and held at a former resort near Bad Nauheim. In February 1942, through Swiss diplomats, Morris reported conditions of the detainment to his superiors in Washington. While there was relative freedom of movement around the resort grounds, he wrote of food shortages and weight-loss amongst the group. In May, Morris and the other Americans were transferred to Lisbon, Portugal where they departed for New York aboard the SS Drottningholm and exchanged for German prisoners being held in the United States.

== Death ==
Morris died on July 2, 1950, at the age of 64, in Washington, D.C.

Diplomatic posts
Preceded by Alexander C. Kirk	United States Chargé d'affaires to Germany; 1940–1941	Succeeded by James Bryant Conant
Preceded by Lincoln MacVeagh	United States Ambassador to Iceland; 1942–1944	Succeeded by Louis Goethe Dreyfus, Jr.
Preceded by post created	United States Ambassador to Iran; 1944-1945	Succeeded by Wal Murray
