= Wilhelm-Gymnasium =

- Wilhelm-Gymnasium
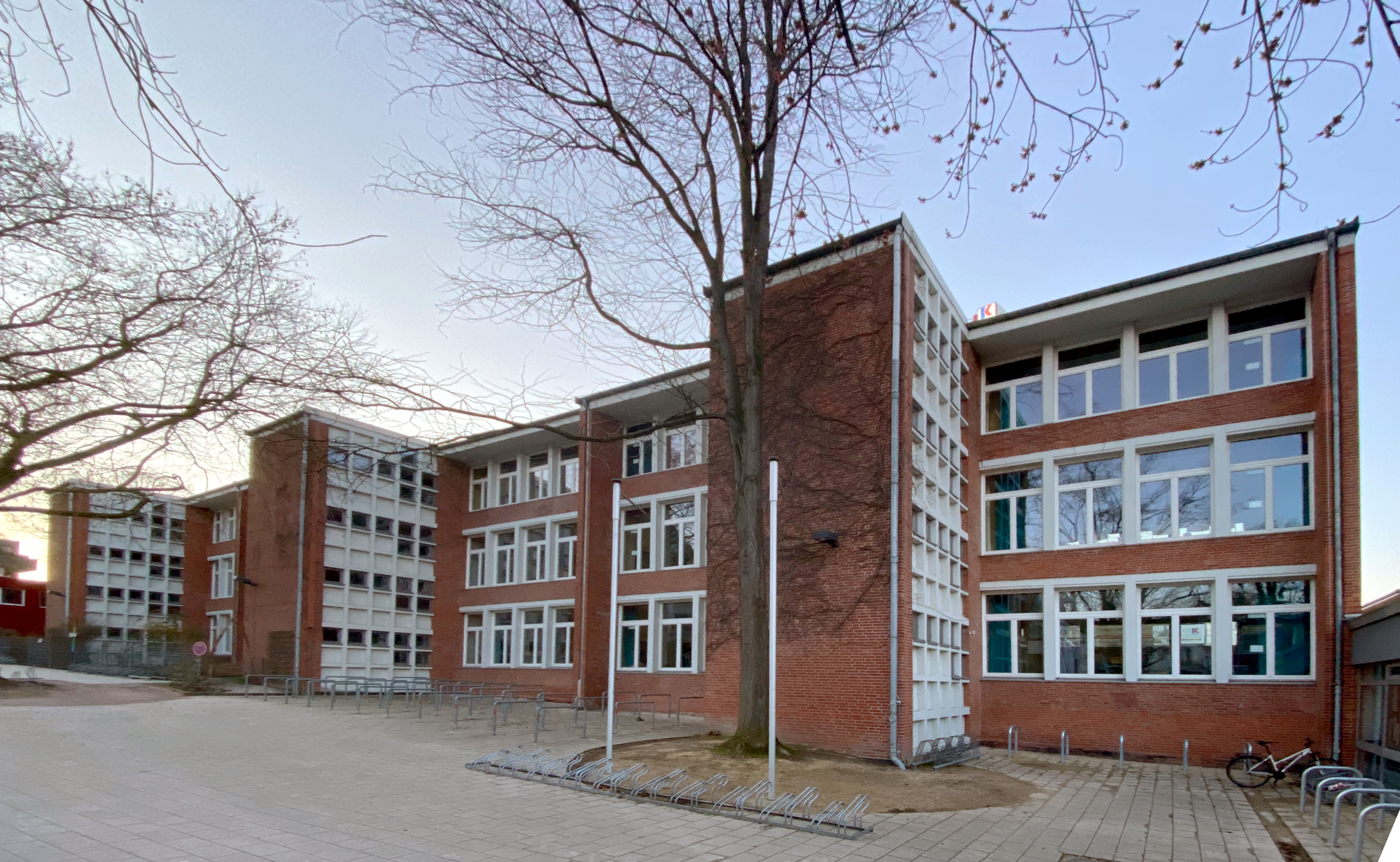
- Classrooms (2020)

Location
- Hamburg; Germany; 53°34′26.5″N 9°59′48.7″E

Information
- Established: 1881; 145 years ago
- Website: http://www.wilhelm-gymnasium.de/

The Wilhelm-Gymnasium is a university preparatory school in Hamburg, Germany. It is one of Hamburg's oldest schools. It was founded in 1881 and called Neue Gelehrtenschule (transl. New Academic school) and soon became a rival of the Academic school of the Johanneum. In 1883 it was renamed Wilhelm Gymnasium to honour the then-present German Emperor, Wilhelm I. Since 1953, the school also accepts girls.

== Location ==
The school opened in 1881 opposite Holstentor, and in 1885 moved to Moorweidenweg, which was renamed Moorweidenstraße in 1892. After gaining an extra floor in 1929, the school was damaged in an air raid in 1943, and moved to Holstenglacis. After moving to Kaiser-Friedrich-Ufer, it moved in 1964 to Klosterstieg in Harvestehude.

== Humanistisches Gymnasium ==
The school is a so-called Humanistisches Gymnasium. Students have the opportunity to learn Latin and Ancient Greek and also learn something about classical antiquity. The head mistress, Ms. Westenhoff said about her school:

A school like ours does not only teach Latin. Any school could do that. We also live what we teach. Teaching in German, music, arts, mathematics, history and geography also have a focus on antiquity. We also instill the values of antiquity in the students.

The Wilhelm-Gymnasium also has a focus on music.

== Sports ==
The school offers various sports, such as rowing or hockey. The school's rowing club was founded by students in 1909. Its members elect their own president. Students of the school have successfully participated in regattas more than once. They also won 13 medals at Jugend trainiert für Olympia. They also enjoy going on rowing trips. Alumni may join the Altherren-Vereinigung des GRV„H“ e. V and donate money to the schools rowing club.

== Newspapers ==
The school has two independent newspapers.

== Social clubs ==
The school offers a number of social clubs such as the chess club, the environmental club, the theatre club and the debating club.

== Student body ==
The school wants to educate youths of requisite qualifications from every social class and ethnic group. It has a diverse student body and enrolls many youth from immigrant families and from poor neighbourhoods.

== Costs ==
Attending the school does not cost any money.

== Notable alumni ==
- Axel von Ambesser (1910–1988), actor and film director
- Thomas Brandis (born 1935), violinist
- Gustav Embden (1874–1933), chemist
- James Franck (1882–1964), Nobel Laureate in Physics
- H. W. Janson (1913–1982), art historian
- Jürgen Ponto (1923–1977), banker
- Henning Rübsam, choreographer
- Herbert Spiro (1924–2010), political scientist
- Arthur Zarden (1885–1944), taxation expert
