= List of ambassadors of the United States to Saudi Arabia =

Ambassador of the United States to Saudi Arabia سفير الولايات المتحدة لدى المملكة العربية السعودية
- Seal of the United States Department of State

- Flag of a United States ambassador

- Incumbent; Jennifer Larson; Chargé d'affaires since August 14, 2026
- Residence: Quincy House
- Nominator: The president of the United States
- Appointer: The president with Senate advice and consent
- Inaugural holder: Bert Fish as Envoy Extraordinary and Minister Plenipotentiary
- Formation: August 7, 1939
- Website: U.S. Embassy – Riyadh

The United States ambassador to Saudi Arabia is the official representative of the president of the United States to the head of state of Saudi Arabia.

The United States recognized the government of King Ibn Saud in 1931, but it was not until 1939 when it appointed its first U.S. ambassador to Saudi Arabia, Bert Fish, then resident in Cairo and ambassador to Egypt. Fish made one trip down to Jeddah in 1940 to meet the King and present his credentials, but it was not until after his mission was terminated that a legation was established there on May 1, 1942.

The ambassador holds the title Ambassador Extraordinary and Plenipotentiary.

== Ambassadors ==
Name	Title	Appointed	Presented credentials	Terminated mission	Notes
Bert Fish – Political appointee	Envoy Extraordinary and Minister Plenipotentiary	Aug 7, 1939	Feb 4, 1940	Feb 28, 1941	The Legation in Jeddah was established on May 1, 1942, with James S. Moose Jr., as Chargé d'Affaires ad interim.
Alexander C. Kirk – Career FSO	Envoy Extraordinary and Minister Plenipotentiary	Feb 21, 1941	May 11, 1942	Jul 18, 1943	
James S. Moose Jr. – Career FSO	Minister Resident/Foreign Service officer	Jun 4, 1943	Jul 18, 1943	Aug 18, 1944	
William A. Eddy – Political appointee	Envoy Extraordinary and Minister Plenipotentiary	Aug 12, 1944	Sep 23, 1944	May 28, 1946	
J. Rives Childs – Career FSO	Envoy Extraordinary and Minister Plenipotentiary	Apr 27, 1946	Jun 29, 1946	Jul 21, 1950	Promoted to Ambassador Extraordinary and Plenipotentiary
Raymond A. Hare – Career FSO	Ambassador Extraordinary and Plenipotentiary	Sep 20, 1950	Oct 24, 1950	Jul 8, 1953	
George Wadsworth – Career FSO	Ambassador Extraordinary and Plenipotentiary	Oct 21, 1953	Jan 9, 1954	Jan 1, 1958	
Donald R. Heath – Career FSO	Ambassador Extraordinary and Plenipotentiary	Nov 27, 1957	Jan 9, 1958	Apr 18, 1961	
Parker T. Hart – Career FSO	Ambassador Extraordinary and Plenipotentiary	Apr 6, 1961	Jul 22, 1961	May 29, 1965	
Hermann F. Eilts – Career FSO	Ambassador Extraordinary and Plenipotentiary	Oct 20, 1965	Jan 15, 1966	Jul 23, 1970	
Nicholas G. Thacher – Career FSO	Ambassador Extraordinary and Plenipotentiary	Sep 8, 1970	Sep 22, 1970	Sep 19, 1973	
James E. Akins – Career FSO	Ambassador Extraordinary and Plenipotentiary	Sep 20, 1973	Nov 7, 1973	Feb 10, 1975	
William J. Porter – Career FSO	Ambassador Extraordinary and Plenipotentiary	Dec 22, 1975	Feb 21, 1976	May 27, 1977	
John C. West – Political appointee	Ambassador Extraordinary and Plenipotentiary	Jun 8, 1977	Jun 29, 1977	Mar 21, 1981	
Robert G. Neumann – Political appointee	Ambassador Extraordinary and Plenipotentiary	May 20, 1981	Jun 22, 1981	Jul 16, 1981	
Richard W. Murphy – Career FSO	Ambassador Extraordinary and Plenipotentiary	Aug 19, 1981	Aug 29, 1981	Aug 21, 1983	
Walter L. Cutler – Career FSO	Ambassador Extraordinary and Plenipotentiary	Feb 10, 1984	Mar 31, 1984	Jun 22, 1987	On Sep 26, 1984, the U.S. Liaison Office in Riyadh was raised to the rank of embassy while the embassy in Jeddah became a consulate.
Hume Alexander Horan – Career FSO	Ambassador Extraordinary and Plenipotentiary	Jul 2, 1987	Sep 22, 1987	Apr 22, 1988	
Walter L. Cutler – Career FSO	Ambassador Extraordinary and Plenipotentiary	Jul 15, 1988	Aug 17, 1988	Apr 30, 1989	
Chas W. Freeman Jr. – Career FSO	Ambassador Extraordinary and Plenipotentiary	Jun 15, 1989	Jan 14, 1990	Aug 13, 1992	
C. David Welch	Chargé d'Affaires ad interim	Aug 13, 1992	N/A	Aug 1, 1994	
Raymond Edwin Mabus Jr. – Political appointee	Ambassador Extraordinary and Plenipotentiary	Jul 5, 1994	Aug 1, 1994	Apr 25, 1996	
Wyche Fowler Jr. – Political appointee	Ambassador Extraordinary and Plenipotentiary	Aug 9, 1996	Sep 14, 1996	Mar 1, 2001	
Robert W. Jordan – Political appointee	Ambassador Extraordinary and Plenipotentiary	Oct 5, 2001	Jun 30, 2002	Oct 13, 2003	
James C. Oberwetter – Political appointee	Ambassador Extraordinary and Plenipotentiary	Dec 11, 2003	Oct 10, 2004	Mar 31, 2007	
Ford M. Fraker – Political appointee	Ambassador Extraordinary and Plenipotentiary	March 30, 2007	September 2, 2007	January 20, 2009	
James B. Smith – Political appointee	Ambassador Extraordinary and Plenipotentiary	September 16, 2009	October 31, 2009	September 27, 2013	
Joseph W. Westphal – Political appointee	Ambassador Extraordinary and Plenipotentiary	March 26, 2014	March 28, 2014	January 8, 2017	
Christopher Henzel	Chargé d'Affaires ad interim	January 8, 2017	N/A	April 17, 2019	
John Abizaid – Political appointee	Ambassador Extraordinary and Plenipotentiary	April 10, 2019	June 16, 2019	January 20, 2021	
Martina A. Strong	Chargé d'Affaires ad interim	January 20, 2021	N/A	April 16, 2023	
Denison Offutt	Chargé d'Affaires ad interim	April 16, 2023	N/A	April 27, 2023	
Michael Alan Ratney - Career FSO	Ambassador Extraordinary and Plenipotentiary	March 14, 2023	April 27, 2023	January 20, 2025	
Alison Dilworth	Chargé d'Affaires ad interim	January 20, 2025	N/A	August 13, 2026	
Jennifer Larson	Chargé d'Affaires ad interim	August 14, 2026	N/A	Present	

== See also ==
- Saudi Arabia–United States relations
- Ambassadors of the United States
- Embassy of Saudi Arabia, Washington, D.C.
- Ambassadors of Saudi Arabia to the United States
