= James E. Akins =

American diplomat (1926–2010)

United States Ambassador to Saudi Arabia
- In office November 7, 1973 – February 10, 1975
- President: Richard Nixon; Gerald R. Ford
- Preceded by: Nicholas G. Thacher
- Succeeded by: William J. Porter

Personal details
- Born: James Elmer Akins; October 15, 1926 Akron, Ohio, U.S.
- Died: July 15, 2010 (aged 83) Mitchellville, Maryland, U.S.
- Education: University of Akron; University of Strasbourg

James Elmer Akins (October 15, 1926 – July 15, 2010) was the U.S. Ambassador to Saudi Arabia from September, 1973 to February, 1976, just in time to serve during the 1973 Oil Crisis of October, 1973 to March, 1974. Akins was a member of the Council on Foreign Relations and on the advisory council of the Iran Policy Committee (IPC). Akins has been involved with the pro-Palestine organization If Americans Knew.

== Early life, education and career ==
Akins was born in Akron, Ohio, in 1926. He attended the University of Akron, leaving to serve in the Navy for two years in World War II, and graduated in 1947. He received a degree in history from the University of Strasbourg, France, in 1951.

He joined the Foreign Service in 1954 and worked in Italy, France, Syria, Lebanon, Kuwait and Baghdad before being appointed to the State Department's top energy post in 1968.

Akins was stationed in Kuwait during the Ramadan Revolution in Iraq, following which the United States provided the new Ba'ath Party government with the names of over 100 suspected leftists to be targeted by death squads. Akins later recalled that he had been "very happy" about these extrajudicial killings, which he said "got rid of a lot of communists.

== Director of fuels and energy at the U.S. State Department ==
In 1971 after Libya demanded an increase of 40 cents a barrel, and the oil companies offered only a nickel, Akins took Libya's side. After the 40-cent price rise went through, it was later seen as an important step in the development of OPEC. After attending a meeting of Arab OPEC oil producers in May 1972 in Algiers, where he confirmed that they were eager to take advantage of the increasing dependence on the crude they pumped of the U.S. and other Western countries, Akins correctly predicted a coming oil embargo, saying that OPEC countries could not spend as much money as they were getting for their oil, and had realized that "oil in the ground is as good as oil in the bank." In an influential article in the journal Foreign Affairs in April 1973, Akins correctly predicted that world oil consumption for the next 12 years would exceed that of all previous human history, and warned that the loss of production from any two Middle Eastern countries would push prices from $3 a barrel to more than $5. In fact, at one point, they reached $39.50. Akins was promoted from director of fuels and energy at the U.S. State Department to U.S. ambassador to Saudi Arabia in September, 1973, one month before the 1973 Oil Crisis began.

== U.S. ambassador to Saudi Arabia ==
One of his first acts as ambassador was to send a confidential message to oil executives who were forming the Aramco consortium in Saudi Arabia "to use their contacts at the highest levels" of the U.S. government to "hammer home the point that oil restrictions are not going to be lifted unless political struggle is settled in a manner satisfactory to Arabs", advocating at least some measure of support for Arab claims against Israel, something he would often do later in life as an industry consultant, and was often criticized for. "Here he was, the American ambassador to Saudi Arabia, attempting to reinforce the Arabs' blackmail of the United States", wrote Steven Emerson in his book The American House of Saud (1985). Akins' reply was that he was just doing his job of promoting U.S. interests, which may or may not coincide with those of Israel because of growing U.S. dependence on Arab oil. Akins was dismissed as ambassador in August 1975 after a series of clashes on policy matters with Secretary of State Henry Kissinger, one involving Akins' assertion (dismissed as "absurd" by Mr. Kissinger) that Kissinger had approved of Iran's raising oil prices to buy American arms, another involving Akins's assertion that a top foreign policy maker (Kissinger?) was pondering a United States takeover of Middle East oil fields. Akins also infuriated the Secretary of State when he protested Kissinger's successful request for Saudi officials to grant entry to New York Times columnist C.L. Sulzberger, who the Saudis had initially refused a visa to because they didn't allow Jews to enter the country. Akins claimed to first find out about his firing from a friend who called to read him a newspaper article reporting it, saying "I presume that I have stepped on a few toes" in an interview with The New York Times. Akins claimed that during his tenure as ambassador he built trust and understanding between Saudi Arabia and Israel, turning King Faisal of Saudi Arabia from rejecting the idea of a Jewish state to accepting the legitimacy of Israel within its pre-1967 borders.

== Criticism of the pro-Israeli lobby ==
In a 1979 interview in Time, Akins warned of a "growing wave of anti-Americanism" in Saudi Arabia. In 1989 Akins and others asked the Federal Election Commission (FEC) to force the American Israel Public Affairs Committee (AIPAC) to register as a political action committee and reveal private information about its operations. Akins was then lead plaintiff in a lawsuit against the FEC, resulting in the 1998 U.S. Supreme Court decision Federal Election Commission v. Akins. In 1994 Akins made a speech in which he said: "Our foreign policy was so pro-Israel that we alienated the Arabs, yet our energy policy, such as it was, made us dependent on Arab oil."

In 2003, former Ambassador Akins participated in an independent investigative commission headed by retired Admiral Thomas H. Moorer. This commission investigated the details of the controversial 1967 USS Liberty incident and determined, among other things, that the state of Israel had deliberately attacked an American ship in international waters, killing 34 U.S. sailors in the process and perpetrating an act of war. Also participating in the commission was Rear Admiral Merlin Staring and U.S. Marine General Raymond G. Davis. The so-called Moorer Commission submitted their findings to the United States government along with a request for a proper Congressional investigation of the attack. No investigation has been conducted.

== Death ==
Akins died July 15, 2010, in Mitchellville, Maryland, after a heart attack.

Diplomatic posts
Preceded by Nicholas G. Thacher	United States Ambassador to Saudi Arabia; September 20, 1973 – February 10, 1975	Succeeded by William J. Porter
