= Howard Christian Naffziger =

American physician

Howard Christian Naffziger (1884–1961) was an American neurosurgeon, noted for his invention of the orbital decompression procedure, to alleviate intraocular pressure that occurs in goiter and other conditions.

== Early life and education ==
Naffziger immigrated to the United States from Bavaria, Germany, and settled in Nevada City, California, after a stint as a farmer in Illinois. He met and married Lizzie Scott Naffziger, with whom he had three children. Only one, Howard Christian Naffziger, born on May 6, 1884, survived into adulthood. Howard Christian Naffziger graduated at the top of his Nevada City High School class, and took one more year of secondary education at Berkeley High School. He enrolled at the University of California, Berkeley, in 1902, but dropped out to work at the Culbertson Mine after his father died of a heart attack. He returned to school in 1904, and earned a medical degree in 1909.

Naffziger interned at the UCSF Medical Center, and was a resident at Johns Hopkins Hospital in Baltimore.

== Career ==
Naffziger set up his own surgical operation in San Francisco, and began teaching at the University of California Medical School. Naffziger's private practice was interrupted by World War I, during which he served at the Letterman Army Hospital. He rejoined the medical school after the war, and was responsible for founding the Department of Neuroscience, which he led until retirement in 1952. He also consulted with the United States Army during World War II, and came to England in July 1943 at the invitation of Brig. Gen. Paul Ramsey Hawley, Chief Surgeon, European Theater of Operations. In retirement, Naffziger served on the board of regents for the University of California System. Naffziger, who had begun consulting the government on medical issues during World War II as a member of the National Research Council, continued as an adviser for the Surgeon General until his death in San Francisco on March 21, 1961.

== Personal life ==
He married Louise McNear in 1919, and had three children, Marion, Jean Louise and Elizabeth. Marion married William Horsley Orrick Jr., Jean Louise married Nicholas G. Thacher. and Elizabeth married W. Eugene Stern, M.D. who had been trained in neurosurgery by Dr. Naffziger at UCSF.
