= Alexander Comstock Kirk =

American diplomat (1888–1979)

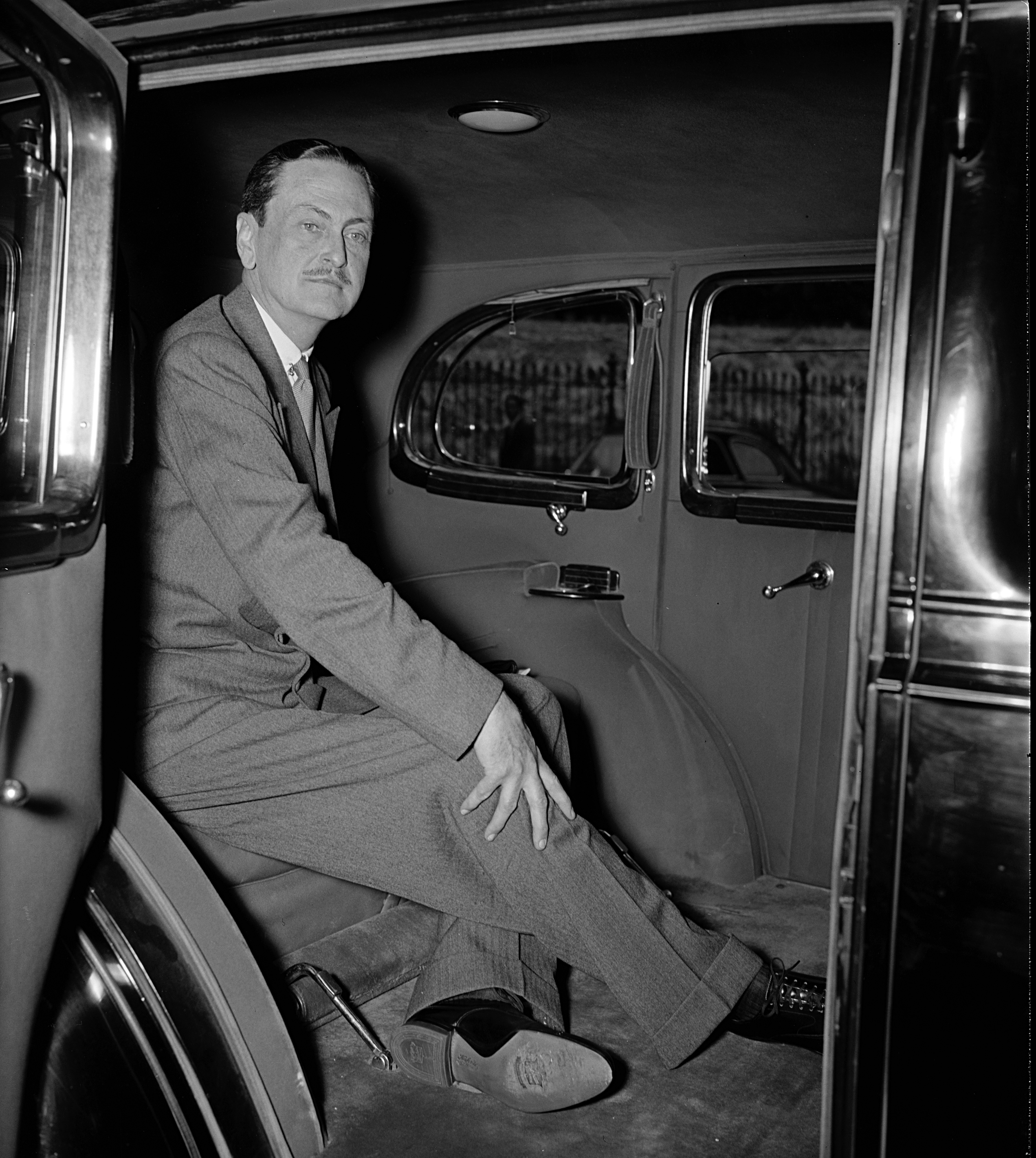
- Kirk in 1940

15th United States Ambassador to Italy
- In office January 8, 1945 – March 5, 1946
- President: Franklin Delano Roosevelt; Harry S. Truman
- Preceded by: George Wadsworth (Acting, 1941)
- Succeeded by: James Clement Dunn

2nd United States Ambassador to Greece
- In office June 15, 1943 – November 25, 1943
- President: Franklin D. Roosevelt
- Preceded by: Anthony Joseph Drexel Biddle Jr.
- Succeeded by: Lincoln MacVeagh

United States Minister to Saudi Arabia
- In office May 11, 1942 – July 18, 1943
- President: Franklin D. Roosevelt
- Preceded by: Bert Fish
- Succeeded by: James S. Moose Jr.

United States Minister to Egypt
- In office March 29, 1941 – April 29, 1944
- President: Franklin D. Roosevelt
- Preceded by: Bert Fish
- Succeeded by: Somerville Pinkney Tuck

United States Ambassador to Germany
- Acting, as chargé d'affaires
- In office May 1939 – October 1940
- President: Franklin D. Roosevelt
- Preceded by: Hugh R. Wilson
- Succeeded by: Leland B. Morris (Acting)

Personal details
- Born: Alexander Comstock Kirk; November 26, 1888 Chicago, Illinois, US
- Died: March 23, 1979 (aged 90) Tucson, Arizona, US
- Education: University of Chicago; Yale University; Sciences Po; Harvard Law School
- Occupation: Diplomat; lawyer

Alexander Comstock Kirk (November 26, 1888 – March 23, 1979) was an American lawyer and diplomat.

== Early years ==
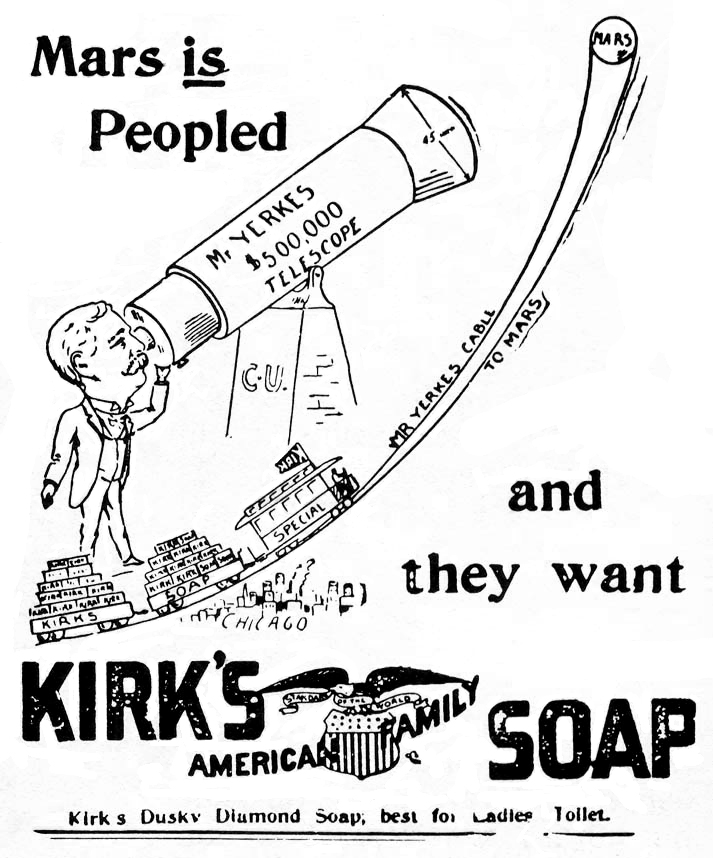
Advertisement for Kirk's soap

Alexander Comstock Kirk was born in Chicago, Illinois, on November 26, 1888, the son of James Alexander Kirk (1840–1907) and Clara Comstock (1851–1936). His family lived in Hartland, Wisconsin. Their wealth derived from one of America's largest soap manufacturing concerns, which was founded by Kirk's grandfather in Utica, New York, in 1839, relocated to Chicago in 1860, and capitalized as James S. Kirk & Co. in 1900. James Alexander Kirk was a director of the company. Its two national brands were "American Family" for laundry and "Juvenile" for the bath. (Note: Kennan (1967) asked rhetorically: "who of my age could forget the 'Kirk's soap' of the advertisements of our boyhood?")

Kirk was "fat" and "unhappy" in childhood and enjoyed drawing. At age 9, he attended the Art Institute of Chicago until his family decided he was too young to be drawing nude models. He was then sent to work incognito in a soap factory until his identity was discovered. He was then tutored at home for half the year by Hughell Fosbroke, future head of the General Theological Seminary of New York, spending the other half traveling in Europe with his mother and sister.

Kirk attended the University of Chicago for one year and then Yale University, where he excelled in physics and graduated in 1909. He appeared with the Yale University Dramatic Association in 1908 and 1909. Kirk's father died of a heart attack in 1907.

He next spent two years at the School of Political Sciences in Paris. In order to fulfill his mother's promise to his late father, he earned his law degree from Harvard Law School in 1914. He was admitted to the Illinois bar. He joined the board of the family business at a salary of $10,000 a year.

Kirk had two sisters, Gertrude 24 years his senior and Margaret his near contemporary. His sister Margaret married Albert Billings Ruddock in New York's Cathedral of St. John the Divine in March 1912. The couple left for Berlin following the ceremony. Ruddock was third secretary of the American Embassy in Berlin in 1913, when Mrs. Kirk visited the couple there. In 1954 Ruddock became chairman of the board of trustees of California Institute of Technology, where an undergraduate residence hall was named for him in 1960.

== Diplomatic career ==
Kirk joined the American Diplomatic Service on March 6, 1915. In 1916, he was transferred from his post as secretary of the embassy in Berlin to a position in Constantinople. Kirk served as private secretary to the Secretary of State during World War I and accompanied him in that position to the 1919 Paris Peace Conference. He then lived in "a commodious old house in Georgetown with his mother to act as hostess on the occasion of his entertainments", until posted to Peking as secretary of the embassy.

He managed the State Department budget for a time in the 1920s, and later said he thought it "an obligation" to spend the entire amount in order to support the argument for additional appropriations. Kirk was counselor of the U.S. Embassy in Rome in 1932. His mother was presented to Queen Elena of Italy on March 9, 1932. She lived in Rome during his service there, and Kirk entertained important guests at her home, the Villa Spada on the Janiculum. Even in 1930, long before rising to ambassadorial rank, he entertained lavishly. He hosted an opera party for Mrs. William Randolph Hearst on her 1930 tour of Europe.

Kirk was assigned to Moscow as embassy counselor and consul general effective March 18, 1938, where he was the senior official in the nine-month interim between the service of Ambassadors Davies and Steinhardt.

He served as chargé d'affaires in Berlin beginning in May 1939 and became the senior officer when the American ambassador, Hugh R. Wilson, was recalled to protest the anti-Jewish attacks of Kristallnacht. Though his status was too low to allow access to important officials in the German government, he communicated with them by staging conversations close to a device the Germans used to eavesdrop on his conversations. Time called him "adroit" in his "uncomfortable post". The recall of Wilson as a way of protesting Kristallnacht greatly offended the Nazi regime, and senior German officials generally snubbed Kirk to show their disapproval. The American historian Abraham Asher described Kirk's dispatches from Berlin as generally accurate, though his lack of high-level contacts limited his sources of information.

In August 1939, the journalist Louis P. Lochner showed Kirk the text of the Obersalzberg speech, asking him to transmit back to Washington, but Kirk was not interested, leading Louchner to turn next to the British diplomat George Ogilvie-Forbes who did indeed transmit it to London. During the Danzig crisis, Kirk found playing himself a bit role. On August 24, 1939, President Franklin D. Roosevelt sent telegrams to both Adolf Hitler and President Ignacy Mościcki appealing to them to find a compromise to end the crisis. Hitler chose not to reply, but Mościcki wrote back that his nation was not the one "formulating demands and demanding concessions", but stated he willing to open negotiations with the Reich on the status of the Free City of Danzig (modern Gdańsk, Poland). As Hitler continued to refuse to answer Roosevelt's telegrams, Kirk was sent to see der Fűhrer in the Reich Chancellery with a copy of Mościcki's reply. As Hitler refused to see him, he instead met on the evening of August 26 with the state secretary of the Auswärtiges Amt, Baron Ernst von Weizsäcker. Kirk argued to Weizsäcker that since for the first time, the Poles were willing to open talks on changing the status of Danzig, which might allow Danzig to "go home to the Reich", that this represented a potential breakthrough on finding a peaceful solution to the crisis. Weizsäcker replied he would pass on Kirk's note for "the consideration of the Foreign Minister", and was otherwise evasive about what his government was planning to do in response.

He developed contacts with Germans who opposed the Nazi regime and became convinced, in spite of Germany's early victories, that the war would end badly for Germany. Discussing with noted dissident Helmuth James von Moltke the need for Germany to suffer complete defeat with no one to blame but its Nazi leaders, he said: "Do you want to know my solution? It's a flood without an ark." During the war, in 1943, Moltke twice tried without success to contact Kirk, whom he trusted as an intermediary between the German opposition and the Allies.

Kirk served briefly as embassy counselor in Rome before becoming minister to Egypt in 1941, when Time magazine described him as "smooth, spare". From March 29, 1941, to March 29, 1944, Kirk served as Ambassador to Egypt, first as head of the U.S. Legation and then of the embassy. King Farouk of Egypt had a strong dislike of homosexuals, and Kirk's relations with the king were distant. By contrast, Kirk was close to Farouk's archenemy, the British ambassador, Sir Miles Lampson, which made for further difficulties as Kirk tended to back Lampson in his dealings with the king. Kirk took the view that it was crucial that the British 8th Army stop the advance of the German Afrika Korps, and given Farouk's pro-Axis sympathies, Lampson's high-handed treatment of the king was necessary.

He advised the State Department in 1941 that a Jewish state "is incapable of realization in the future unless imposed by force on an unwilling native population." Under Secretary of State Sumner Welles did not share his assessment and did not forward Kirk's views to the White House. Drawing on his experience with Nazi propaganda and antisemitism in Germany, Kirk expanded the embassy's coverage of Radio Berlin's Arabic-language broadcasts, providing complete translations of what came to be known as the "Axis Broadcasts in Arabic" along with his weekly analysis from 1941 to 1944, which Hull circulated widely. He dissected the Nazis' manipulation of anti-colonial, anti-Jewish, and anti-Bolshevik sentiment and their charges that Roosevelt and Churchill were being manipulated by their Jewish supporters. At the beginning of his Cairo tenure, Kirk focused on the strategic necessity of Allied victory in the Middle East because it would be impossible to counter the Nazi's exploitation of an Axis victory in its propaganda. Once the Allies won control of the region, he stressed political analysis and repeatedly underscored the critical role of the Egyptian capital in Arab nationalism. As Kirk looked to the end of the war, he anticipated a post-colonial world in which nations operated freely in a free enterprise environment, unlike Secretary of State Cordell Hull who expected the persistence of traditional spheres of influence, notably that of Great Britain in Egypt.

While posted to Cairo, Kirk kept one house in the city for lunch, another near the pyramids for dinner and sleeping, and a houseboat on the Nile. As ambassador, Kirk was noted for his eccentricities such as wearing lavender silk tuxedos; maintaining a houseboat on the Nile flamboyantly decorated with white ostrich feathers and a framed picture of his mother with candles burning around it; and his insistence on only drinking milk from an Egyptian water buffalo he adopted and named after his mother. Even through Kirk was as openly gay as it was possible to be in the 1940s, he was popular with the diplomatic corps in Cairo, who liked him for his charm, and his frequent parties on his houseboat were always well attended. He hosted FDR, Churchill, and Chiang Kai-shek at the second house for the November 1943 Cairo Conference. He has been described as "an archeological dilettante" who liked to lecture his guests as they gazed at the pyramids. Clare Boothe Luce claimed to have flummoxed him by pre-empting his performance by asking: "Mr. Ambassador, what are those strange-looking objects?"

Along with several military men Kirk devised the successful plan to attack Rommel's communications instead of his ground forces. He later received the United States of America Typhus Commission Medal for his support of the commission's work during his time in Egypt. While resident in Cairo, Kirk was also accredited to the government-in-exile of Greece until November 13, 1941, and to Saudi Arabia until July 18, 1943.

Kirk was appointed U.S. representative on the Allied Advisory Council for Italy, with the rank of ambassador, on April 4, 1944. He was appointed Ambassador to Italy on November 30, 1944, and in January 1945 became the first ambassador of any country to present his credentials to the new Italian government. Upon his appointment, Time gave him the title "suave Career Man". He resigned in 1946. When the American Office of War Information produced an Italian-language publication, Kirk insisted it be labeled propaganda to maintain a clear distinction between what Italians were accomplishing for themselves or not.

In August 1945, he received petitions from Soviet prisoners of war, taken by the Germans and liberated by Allied forces. They wrote to him in his role as political advisor to Supreme Headquarters Allied Expeditionary Force (SHAEF) and claimed the status of "political refugees" and asked "in the name of humanity" not to be repatriated to the Soviet Union. Kirk wrote to Secretary of State Byrnes seeking guidance, a diplomatic way of expressing his reservations about the repatriation policy. He was instructed to make certain none of the prisoners was actually from Poland or the Baltic States and to proceed with the repatriations.

Kirk was long famous for entertaining and continued even when forced to operate in Rome "under a wartime minimum". Six or eight guests joined him for lunch or dinner, often many more. One Friday lunch he hosted about 20 enlisted men. Though some involved in recruiting the guests worried that a Negro corporal might not be well received, Kirk gave him the place of honor on his right.

Life described him near the end of his career: "To call Kirk an ornament of the State Department is almost a libelous understatement. ... Kirk's true value resides in the fact that he is an American who, far from being an innocent abroad, knows Europe infinitely better than most Europeans. This makes him almost unique in the current roster of U.S. foreign representatives in the diplomatic, charitable, or didactic spheres. Kirk's career should be studied in detail, like The Education of Henry Adams." Fortune in July 1946 called him "foppish, intelligent, and very rich".

Kirk predicted in 1945 that future diplomats should be technical experts "chosen for the ability not only to diagnose economic, industrial and political trends, but also to adjust their dislocations before they can start wars." He lamented the willingness of governments to spend on wars far more than on the diplomacy that might prevent them.

A few years after Kirk's retirement, as Senator Joseph McCarthy launched a campaign against suspected homosexuals in government, one investigator's 1948 report charged that State Department employees Carmel Offie and Charles W. Thayer "were very close personal friends of former Ambassador Alexander Kirk who is not now in the service but who had a very bad reputation of being a homosexual and certainly protected a lot of homosexual people."

== Personal life ==
In the 1920s, when he was counselor to the American Embassy in Rome, Kirk remodeled a significant building in Georgetown, the Robinson house, at the corner of Wisconsin Avenue and R Street and "filled it with furniture, rugs, hangings and objects of art brought from the Orient." In 1942 he sold this estate, including its "elaborate formal gardens, outsize ballroom, marble-floored billiard room, and swimming pool", to Evalyn Walsh McLean, mining heiress and owner of the Hope Diamond.

While posted to Berlin, he lived in an "enormous mansion" in the "swank" Grunewald neighborhood. One German who visited described it as "one vast hall after another, and he quiet alone in the midst of it. Very funny; a little like the theatre." His staff of servants spoke only Italian. He held "a large buffet luncheon every Sunday noon, as a means of revenging himself for such hospitality as his position required him to accept."

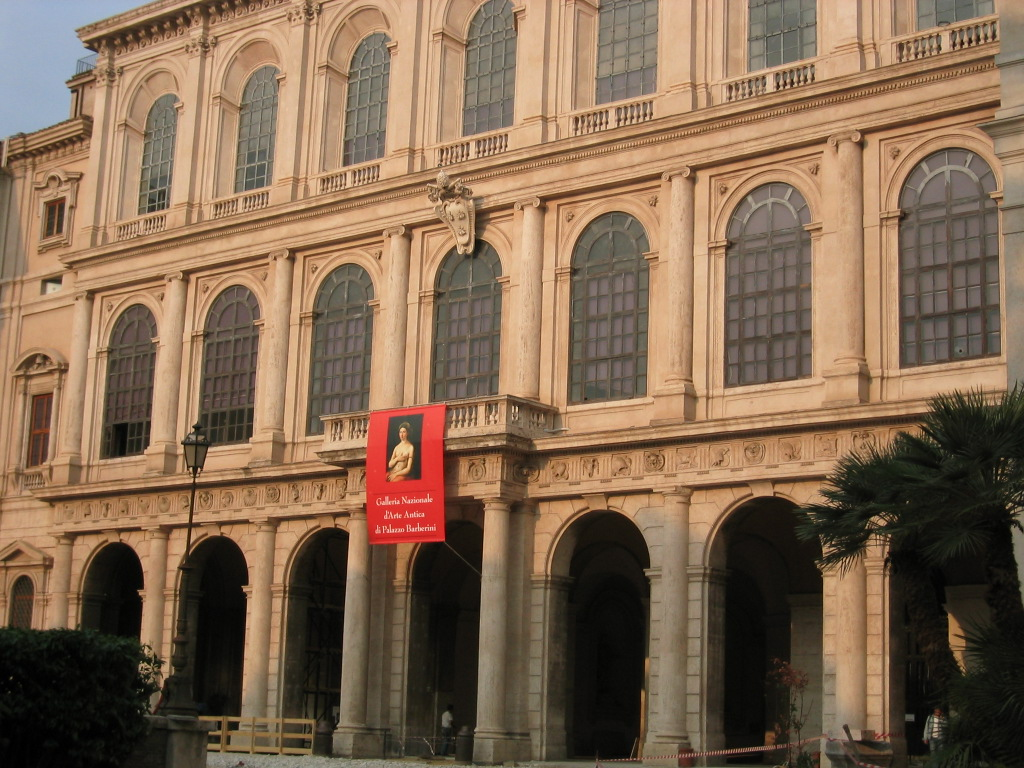
Façade of Palazzo Barberini

While ambassador in Rome, Kirk lived in the Barberini palace, which he redecorated. He filled a large enclosure the size of a tennis court with "Renaissance tables and settees covered in ivory silk", according to Life magazine, to create what he termed "a sort of cozy sitting room". When Life profiled him in 1945, it reported that he had always established fine residences wherever he was posted: "The Ambassador is fond of houses, and especially big ones. Equipped with ample private funds and the courage of his complexes, Kirk sees no reason why he should not capitalize the chance his profession gives him to indulge this fondness, all the more since such indulgence usually works out to the benefit of the State Department in one way or another." His nickname around this time was "Buffy".

In 1945 he attributed "his excellent health to the fact that he has never worn himself down by any form of exercise more violent than scratching, which he only does when suffering from insomnia at 6 a.m."

He planned to retire to Arizona and bought a piece of land in the White Mountains at the end of World War II. He joked that he would live there not in a house but in a cave. Another diplomat reported that he retired to the mountains of Colorado and "amused himself operating a ranch and raising cattle" for a few years before relocating to Texas.

His sister Gertrude Kirk Metzeroff died in St. Petersburg, Florida, in 1948 at the age of 84. According to her obituary, her brother Alexander was then living in Washington, D.C., and Santa Barbara, California, while her sister Margaret was living in Santa Barbara.

Kirk died in Tucson, Arizona, on March 23, 1979. He is buried with his mother in Rome's Protestant Cemetery (Cimitero Acattolico).

In his 1967 memoirs, George F. Kennan sketched an affectionate portrait of Kirk, as he knew him in Berlin before America entered World War II: "a confirmed bachelor, profoundly saddened by the recent death of an adored mother who, while she was alive, had preempted much of both his companionship and his emotional life, Kirk drowned the inner emptiness in the performance of his arduous official duties", sleeping in an office alcove while working 16 to 18 hours daily. He continued:

He was a carryover from an older day when to be rich entitled you to be eccentric, and he made the most of the privilege. ...

Deliberately, I think, as a gesture of defiance and self-protection, and in the indulgence of a fine sense of the theatrical, Kirk worked at giving himself the aspect of exactly that sort of American career diplomat of which the American philistine has always been the most suspicious: elegant, overrefined, haughty, and remote. It was a manner of enlivening life by playing the buffoon. ... His understanding was intuitive rather than analytical. His conversation consisted largely of weary, allusive quips. His posing sometimes went so far as to raise doubts whether he was serious.

But behind this facade of urbane and even exaggerated sophistication there lay a great intuitive shrewdness and a devastating critical sense of humor, directed to himself as well as others. No one impressed him. ... He despised the Nazis and held them at arm's length with barbed irony. ...

The only thing worth living for, he once told me, was good form. He himself had little to live for; there were moments when he would have liked to leave this life; but suicide would be an abrupt act, and abruptness was the height of bad form. ... He disclaimed all further interest in the Foreign Service, since his mother's death. He had entered it, he solemnly maintained, only to spare her having her bags inspected at frontiers. But he could not just resign, especially in wartime; that would have been abrupt. ...

After service as Ambassador in Egypt and Italy, he sidled, quietly and unobserved, out of all of our lives.

Kirk claimed he escaped from diplomatic functions by whatever ruse the situation required. At one embassy in Rome he found it necessary to leave by a door he could only reach by going under a grand piano. "In a case of this sort, Kirk recommends slow motion, which, he says, often prevents witnesses from even noticing a maneuver which, if executed fast, might horrify them."

He insisted his favorite color was gray. He never had fresh flowers, rather he collected artificial ones in his favorite color. His wardrobe and household were maintained by a servant named Mario, who joined the Kirk household in Mexico early in Kirk's career and continued through his stint as ambassador in Rome.

== Sources ==
- Kennan, George F. (1967). Memoirs, 1925–1950. Boston: Little, Brown.
- Shirer, William Lawrence (1960), The Rise and Fall of the Third Reich: A History of Nazi Germany, New York City: Simon & Schuster, ASIN B0766DKDLR, LCCN 60006729, OCLC 1286630, OL 5794925M, Wikidata Q138029595

Diplomatic posts
Preceded by Hugh R. Wilson	United States Chargé d'affaires to Germany; May 1939 – October 1940	Succeeded by Leland B. Morris
Preceded by Bert Fish	United States Ambassador to Egypt; February 11, 1941 – April 29, 1944; Envoy Extraordinary and Minister Plenipotentiary	Succeeded by Somerville Pinkney Tuck
Preceded by A. J. Drexel Biddle Jr.	United States Ambassador to Greece; 1943	Succeeded by Lincoln MacVeagh
Preceded by George Wadsworth; Chargé d'affaires ad interim	United States Ambassador to Italy; 1944–1946	Succeeded by James Clement Dunn
