= Mabel Murphy Smythe-Haith =

American diplomat

- Mabel H. Murphy, from a 1937 magazine
- Born: April 3, 1918; Montgomery, Alabama, U.S.
- Died: February 7, 2006 (aged 87)
- Education: Northwestern University, University of Wisconsin
- Spouse: Hugh H. Smythe

Mabel Murphy Smythe-Haith (April 3, 1918 – February 7, 2006) was an American diplomat who served as Ambassador for the United States to Cameroon and later Equatorial Guinea, as well as the Deputy Assistant Secretary of State for African Affairs.

== Early life and education ==
Born in Montgomery, Alabama on April 3, 1918, Mabel Murphy Smythe-Haith was the daughter of Josephine Dibble and Henry Saunders Murphy. She had two older sisters and a younger brother. Both her parents were college educated and actively involved in the world of education. Her father began his career teaching at what is now Langston University. He later moved to what is now Alabama State where he stayed for several years before he accepted a job with the Standard Life Insurance Company to organize and run their printing division. Her mother spent a year as the dean of women at Fort Valley State College in Atlanta, Georgia, before becoming a “university hostess” at Atlanta University where she also served as the president of Alumni Association for twenty-two years. Smythe-Haith enrolled in Spelman College when she was 15 but transferred to Mount Holyoke College in Massachusetts to complete her bachelor's degree. Two years after she received her bachelor's degree, she married Hugh H. Smythe. After her marriage, Smythe-Haith earned her master's degree from Northwestern University in 1940 She received a Rosenwald Fellowship in 1941 which enabled her to study for a doctoral degree in labor economics and law in 1942 from the University of Wisconsin. Her first husband Hugh H. Smythe, sociologist, was also a Rosenwald Fellowship recipient (1939).

== Career ==
Smythe-Haith began her career as a professor. She taught briefly at three historically black institutions, Fort Valley State University, Lincoln University and Tennessee State University. Subsequently, Smythe-Haith taught economics at Brooklyn College in New York. From 1951 to 1953 she taught economics and English at Shiga University in Japan, where she learned Japanese and co-authored a Japanese-English phrase book.

In 1953, Smythe-Haith joined the NAACP Legal Defense and Education Fund as deputy director. She worked alongside Thurgood Marshall and helped him prepare the Brown v. Board of Education desegregation case.

Smythe-Haith also worked with James Robinson, the founder of Operations Crossroads Africa, in 1958. She helped launch on a student-exchange program between Africa and the United States and also worked with college admission officers to help Nigerian students attend Harvard and other universities through the African Scholarship Program. She also served as a consultant for Encyclopædia Britannica and Vice President of the Phelps Stokes Fund. She was also a trustee of the Cottonwood Foundation and worked with the United States Civil Rights Commission as the Scholar-in-Residence.

In 1962, Smythe-Haith was appointed to the State Department's Advisory Council for African American Affairs by President John F. Kennedy. President Jimmy Carter chose Smythe-Haith as U.S. Ambassador to Cameroon and the Republic of Equatorial Guinea in 1977. She was only the second African-American women to be an ambassador. She held these posts concurrently for three years.

After her ambassadorship, she was the Deputy Assistant Secretary of State for African Affairs. From 1981 to 1985, she taught at Northwestern University and served as the Melville J. Heskovits professor and director of African studies. After she retired in 1985, she served as a guest scholar at the Woodrow Wilson International Center for Scholars.

== Personal life ==
Smythe-Haith married her first husband, Hugh H. Smythe, in 1939, after they met in Atlanta. The two had a daughter, Karen Pamela Smythe. Hugh Smythe died in 1978. In 1985, Smythe-Haith married retired hospital director, Robert Haith Jr., who died three years later.

Smythe-Haith died on February 7, 2006, from Alzheimer's disease.

Diplomatic posts
Preceded by Herbert J. Spiro	United States Ambassador to Cameroon; 1977–1980	Succeeded by Hume A. Horan
Preceded by Herbert J. Spiro	United States Ambassador to Equatorial Guinea; 1979–1980	Succeeded by Hume A. Horan
