= Hume Horan =

American diplomat

Hume Alexander Horan (August 13, 1934 – July 22, 2004) was an American diplomat and ambassador to five countries, who has been described as "perhaps the most accomplished Arabic linguist to serve in the U.S. Foreign Service."

== Early life ==
Horan was born to Margaret Robinson Hume and Abdullah Entezam in 1934 in Washington, D.C. His mother came from a well-to-do family; her grandfather served as a diplomat in President Abraham Lincoln's administration, her own father had been the mayor of Georgetown, and Stephen Vincent Benét was a cousin. Entezam was an Iranian diplomat. Horan's parents divorced just three years after his birth (though they had been married for over a decade), and Margaret Hume subsequently married a newspaperman named Harold Horan. The family then moved to Argentina. Entezam went on to become the Iranian Foreign Minister and head of National Iranian Oil Company before dying in 1985.

Horan was sent by his parents to a boarding school in Rhode Island named Portsmouth Priory, and as an adolescent at an all-boys school he detested it. Horan was soon thrown out and sent to study at the St. Andrew's School in Delaware, which he found much more enjoyable.

In 1954 Hume Horan joined the U.S. Army, leaving two years later to study at Harvard College. In 1960 he graduated from Harvard with a degree in American History and promptly joined the U.S. Foreign Service, though he came back to Harvard to earn his M.A. in 1963 at the Center for Middle Eastern Studies, during which time he studied Arabic under the British orientalist Sir Hamilton A. R. Gibb.

== Diplomatic career ==
Horan's diplomatic career spanned the Greater Middle East; his first requested assignment was to a post in Baghdad, a rather unusual choice at the time.

=== List of posts ===
- 1966-1970 Libyan desk officer
- 1970-1972 Political officer in Amman, Jordan
- 1972-1977 Deputy chief of mission in Jeddah, Saudi Arabia
- 1980-1983 Ambassador to the Republic of Cameroon and non-resident ambassador to Equatorial Guinea
- 1983-1986 Ambassador to Sudan
- 1987 Diplomat-in-residence at Georgetown University
- 1987–1988 Ambassador to Saudi Arabia (ended by order from King Fahd)
- 1992- Ambassador to Ivory Coast
- Diplomat-in-residence at Howard University
- (-1998) Director of African training program at the Foreign Service Institute

== Later life ==
Following the American-led invasion of Iraq, Horan worked for six months as a senior counselor on tribal and religious issues for the Coalition Provisional Authority in 2003. During this time he traveled across Iraq with little security, and was to meet Grand Ayatollah Ali al-Sistani before a protest in Najaf by Muqtada al-Sadr prevented it. He was referred to by CPA head L. Paul Bremer as his "pet Bedouin," and was rewarded for his work with the Distinguished Public Service Award by the Department of Defense. He died at Inova Fairfax Hospital in 2004 after battling prostate cancer.

== Personal life ==
Horan's first wife was Nancy Reinert Horan, and they had two sons and a daughter. After a divorce he remarried Lori Shoemaker, who gave birth to a son, Michael Horan, and daughter, Elizabeth Horan.

== Writings ==
- Horan, Hume (March 2004). "Focus on Iraq: Restoring a Shattered Mosaic" (PDF). Foreign Service Journal. Archived from the original (PDF) on 2007-07-13.

Diplomatic posts
Preceded by Mabel Murphy Smythe	United States Ambassador to Equatorial Guinea; 1980–1981	Succeeded by Alan M. Hardy
Preceded by Mabel M. Smythe	United States Ambassador to Cameroon; 1980–1983	Succeeded by Myles Robert Rene Frechette
Preceded by C. William Kontos	United States Ambassador to Sudan; 1983–1986	Succeeded by G. Norman Anderson
Preceded by Walter L. Cutler	United States Ambassador to Saudi Arabia; 1987–1988	Succeeded by Walter L. Cutler
