= Nicholas G. Thacher =

American diplomat

Nicholas Gilman Thacher (August 20, 1915 – March 11, 2002) was a United States diplomat.

== Early life and career ==
He was born in Kansas City, Missouri in 1915 to John Hamilton Thacher and Edith Gilman Thacher. He had an older brother, John Jr., and an older sister, writer Edith Thacher Hurd. Thacher attended the Lawrenceville School in New Jersey and graduated from Princeton University with a degree in economics. Upon graduation from Princeton, Thacher worked for Bankers Trust and simultaneously worked on a law degree from Fordham University. He entered officer training school and served aboard the USS Pensacola during World War II. He was discharged from the navy in January 1946.

== Diplomatic career ==
Thacher joined the United States Foreign Service in 1947. He served in Karachi, Jeddah, Calcutta, and Tehran, where he was deputy ambassador to Iran. He was named the United States Ambassador to Saudi Arabia on September 8, 1970, and retired on September 19, 1973.

== Later life ==
In retirement, Thacher moved to San Francisco and worked for Wells Fargo. He also lectured at Stanford University.

Thacher was married to Jean-Louise Naffziger, daughter of Howard Christian Naffziger and Louise McNear Naffziger, from 1947 until his death in 2002 from pulmonary fibrosis. She died in 2010.

Diplomatic posts
Preceded by Hermann F. Eilts	United States Ambassador to Saudi Arabia; 1970–1973	Succeeded by James E. Akins
