= William A. Eddy =

American diplomat and educator

William Alfred Eddy
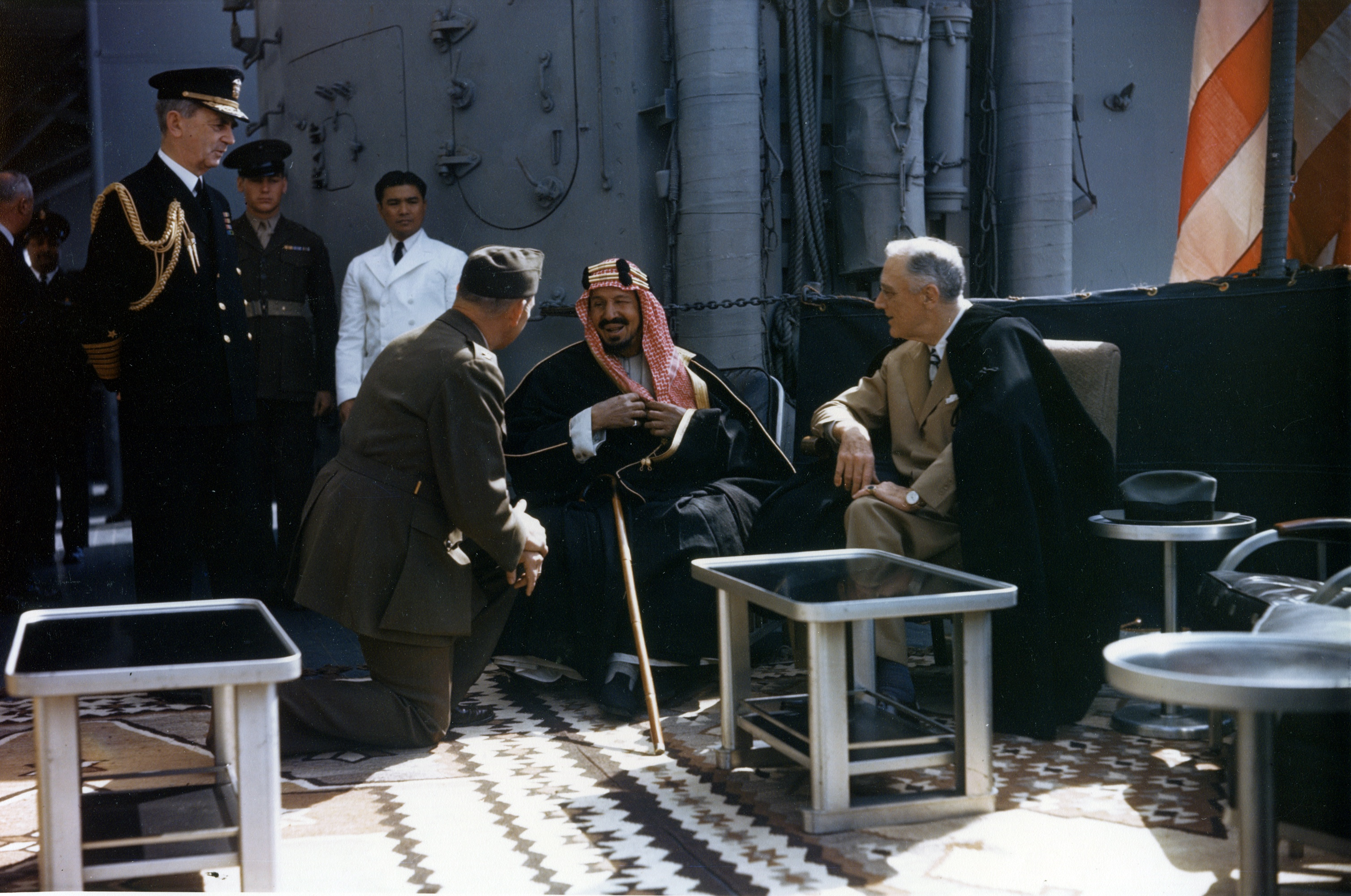
- Eddy, kneeling on the left, speaking to King Ibn Saud, during his meeting with U.S. President Franklin Roosevelt (right).

United States Minister to Saudi Arabia
- In office 12 August 1944 – 28 May 1946

Personal details
- Born: March 9, 1896 Sidon, Lebanon
- Died: May 3, 1962 (66 years) Beirut, Lebanon
- Profession: University professor
- Awards: Navy Cross; Distinguished Service Cross; Silver Star (2); Purple Heart (2)
- Nickname: Bill Eddy

Military service
- Allegiance: United States
- Branch/service: United States Marine Corps
- Years of service: 1917–c.1918 1941–1944
- Rank: Colonel
- Commands: 6th Marine Regiment
- Battles/wars: World War I; Battle of Belleau Wood; World War II

William Alfred Eddy, Ph.D., Col., USMC (March 9, 1896 – May 3, 1962) was a U.S. minister to Saudi Arabia (1944–1946); university professor and college president (1936–1942); U.S. Marine Corps officer, serving in World War I and World War II; and U.S. intelligence officer.

After serving in World War I, Eddy had an academic career as a literary scholar and professor of English, at Dartmouth College and the American University in Cairo. He was later president of both Hobart College and William Smith College (1936–1942). Eddy returned to military service just before the start of World War II, serving as an intelligence officer.

From 1943 to 1945, he was the U.S. Minister to Saudi Arabia, a consultant for the Arabian American Oil Company (Aramco) and an instrumental figure in the development of the United States' relationship with the Kingdom of Saudi Arabia and other Middle Eastern countries. He was a key figure in the formation of the CIA.

In 2008, Arabian Knight: Colonel Bill Eddy USMC and the Rise of American Power in the Middle East, the first biography on him, was published by Selwa Press. It is written by the Middle East specialist, author and Washington Post journalist Thomas Lippman.

== Early life ==
Eddy was born in 1896 in Sidon, Lebanon. His parents, William King Eddy and Elizabeth Mills (Nelson) Eddy, were Presbyterian missionaries from the United States. Eddy grew up speaking both English at home and in school and Arabic on the streets with his friends. He stayed in the Middle East until high school and then went to the College of Wooster for his college preparatory education. His overseas upbringing and firsthand knowledge of Arabic would play a pivotal role in his life and in US–Saudi relations.

== World War I ==
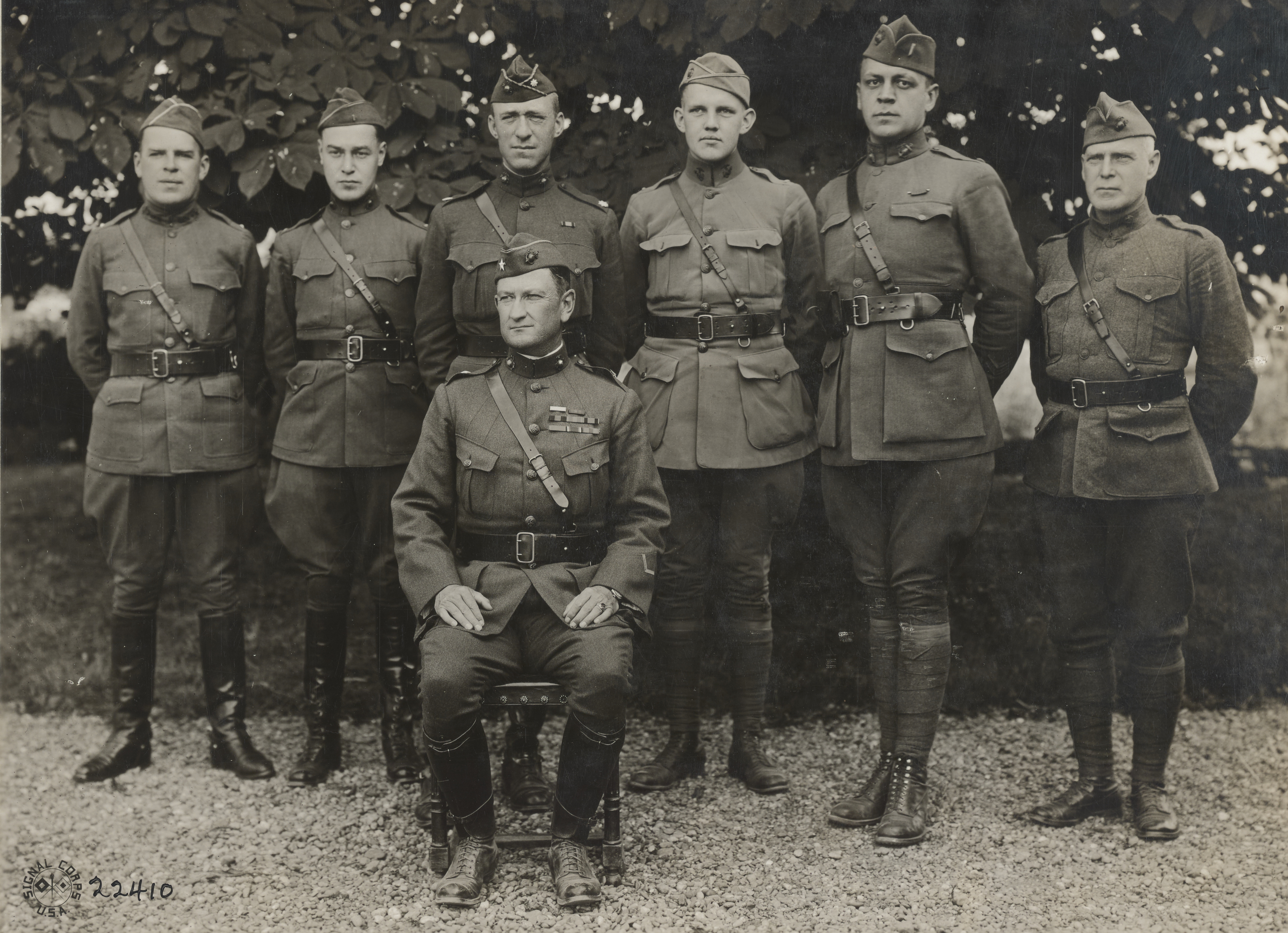
Capt. William Eddy (4th from left), 1918.

Following his graduation from Princeton University in 1917 and marriage to Mary Garvin, Eddy was accepted into the United States Marine Corps on June 6, 1917, as a "temporary second lieutenant" and was a part of the first American Marines fighting in Europe in World War I, serving as an intelligence officer with the 6th Marine Regiment.

During the war he fought alongside other U.S. Marines in the German Offensive of 1918 and in the Battle of Belleau Wood against German Empire troops that same year. The battle is seen as an important success for allied forces against the Germans. On the night of 4 June, Lt. Eddy, the intelligence officer for the 6th Marines, and two men stole through German lines to gather information about German forces. They gathered valuable information showing the Germans were consolidating machine gun positions and bringing in artillery. While this activity indicated an attack was not immediately likely, their increasing strength was creating a base of attack that raised concern about them breaking through to Paris. Eddy was wounded in his right hip at Belleau Wood. The hip eventually became infected, which led Eddy to lose all mobility in the hip and left him with a pronounced limp for the rest of his life. He was then sent back to the U.S. to recuperate.

For his actions as a combat Marine in World War I, he received the Navy Cross, the Distinguished Service Cross, two Silver Stars, and two Purple Hearts.

== Interwar period ==
After his military service, Eddy taught at Peekskill Military Academy in New York. In 1922, he received his doctorate from Princeton University. His dissertation was on Gulliver's Travels. His book on Gulliver is regarded as a significant examination of some issues.

In 1923, he was appointed as the chair of the English Department at the American University in Cairo in Egypt. His wife and children found life in Egypt difficult, however, and Eddy returned to the U.S. in 1928 to accept a teaching position at Dartmouth College.

In 1936, he became president of Hobart College in Upstate New York.

== World War II ==
With the threat of another world war looming, Eddy returned to active duty in the United States Marine Corps at the rank of lieutenant colonel and in 1941, he became the naval attaché and naval attaché for air in Cairo. He would work with both Naval Intelligence and the Office of Strategic Services (OSS) for the duration of the war.

Early in the war, Eddy suggested for the United States to try to become closer to Saudi Arabia because of its strategic importance, relative independence, and internal stability.

In December 1941, Eddy was redeployed as Naval Attaché to Tangier, Morocco, to try to help secure areas of North Africa under threat by the Germans. He was instrumental in obtaining intelligence there and set up an intelligence network, which streamlined the process of conveying information from the field back to the US.

While in Tangier, Eddy was also part of a group that helped organize subversive fighting elements in Spanish Morocco in case the Germans made it there.

His intelligence work on the ground was a key to the success of Operation Torch, which began in 1942.

== Saudi Arabia ==
In 1943, the navy and the OSS agreed to cooperate in sending Eddy to Saudi Arabia as a U.S. State Department employee. His official title was "Special Assistant to the American Minister" resident at the American Legation in the city of Jeddah. He was told to visit neighboring Persian Gulf states as well in order to begin and build the U.S.–Middle East relationships that were already beginning to emerge.

At the time, U.S. President Franklin D. Roosevelt had already begun in earnest to begin a relationship with Saudi Arabia, and oil exploration and drilling was continuing and building up via the US company CASOC, Aramco's predecessor.

In 1944, he met King Abdul-Aziz Al Saud (Ibn Saud) for the first time, and they would maintain a close relationship until the king's death in 1953. On September 23, 1944, he became the "Envoy Extraordinary and Minister Plenipotentiary" to Saudi Arabia, remaining in this post until May 28, 1946—the 2nd resident U.S. chief of mission to Saudi Arabia.

On February 14, 1945, King Abdul-Aziz had a historic meeting with President Roosevelt on board the U.S. Naval ship the USS Quincy on the Great Bitter Lake of the Suez Canal in Egypt. Colonel Eddy was asked by the King to be the interpreter for both the King and for President Roosevelt for their conversation. It was the first time the King had left Saudi Arabia. Much of the men's conversation was recorded by Eddy in a later work titled FDR Meets Ibn Saud.

During his brief stay in the kingdom, Eddy was instrumental in cementing the U.S.-Saudi relationship and in bringing in U.S. business to the kingdom and in keeping out other foreign, mainly British at the time, business interests.

Eddy left in 1946 and then spent some time in Yemen further developing U.S. relations with the Middle East.

== State Department and CIA ==
On August 1, 1946, Eddy was appointed special assistant to the secretary of state for research and intelligence where he oversaw the integration of the OSS Research and Analysis Branch into the Department of State (which later became the Bureau of Intelligence and Research - INR). He was an instrumental figure in the passing of the National Security Act of 1947, which allowed for the creation of the Central Intelligence Agency. Eddy and his family moved to Washington, D.C., where he worked on creating and developing the CIA and also on continuing the development of U.S.–Middle Eastern relations.

Writing from his new home base of Beirut in the late 1940s, Eddy included in his CIA assessment of the region a warning about religious fundamentalism that could grow with continued US support of the partition idea.

== Aramco ==
During the late 1940s and throughout the 1950s, Eddy worked as a consultant for the Arabian American Oil Company (Aramco). He was an instrumental figure in keeping Aramco–Saudi relations as peaceful as could be. Given King Abdul-Aziz's relationship with Eddy and other Americans like Thomas Barger, the Saudis resisted completely nationalizing the company and instead brokered several key deals that would maintain American involvement and training while at the same time expanding benefits brought by the oil revenue to more Saudis.

== Final days ==
His final days were spent in Beirut. Eddy died of a stroke on May 3, 1962, at age 66 in the hospital of the American University of Beirut, which his father and family friends had helped to found.

He was buried in the city of his birth, Sidon, in a Lebanese Christian graveyard. His grave is inscribed: "William Alfred Eddy. Colonel, U.S.M.C. Born Sidon, March 9, 1896. Died Beirut, May 3, 1962."

== Awards and decorations ==
His awards include:

Navy Cross
Distinguished Service Cross
Silver Star with award star
Legion of Merit
Purple Heart with award star
World War I Victory Medal with bronze campaign medal
American Defense Service Medal
American Campaign Medal
European-African-Middle Eastern Campaign Medal with bronze campaign star
World War II Victory Medal

=== Navy Cross citation ===
Citation:

The President of the United States of America takes pleasure in presenting the Navy Cross to Second Lieutenant William A. Eddy (MCSN: 0-1135), United States Marine Corps, for extraordinary heroism while serving as the Intelligence Officer, 6th Regiment (Marines), 2d Division, A.E.F. in action near Torcy, France, 4 June 1918. While leader of a raiding party, Second Lieutenant Eddy displayed great courage and devotion to duty by fearlessly entering dangerous areas and obtaining valuable information.

=== Distinguished Service Cross citation ===
Citation:

The President of the United States of America, authorized by Act of Congress, July 9, 1918, takes pleasure in presenting the Distinguished Service Cross to Second Lieutenant William A. Eddy (MCSN: 0-1135), United States Marine Corps, for extraordinary heroism while serving as the Intelligence Officer, Sixth Regiment (Marines), 2d Division, A.E.F., in action near Torcy, France, 4 June 1918. While leader of a raiding party, Second Lieutenant Eddy displayed great courage and devotion to duty by fearlessly entering dangerous areas and obtaining valuable information.

== See also ==
- List of ambassadors of the United States to Saudi Arabia
