= Bert Fish =

American diplomat (1875–1943)

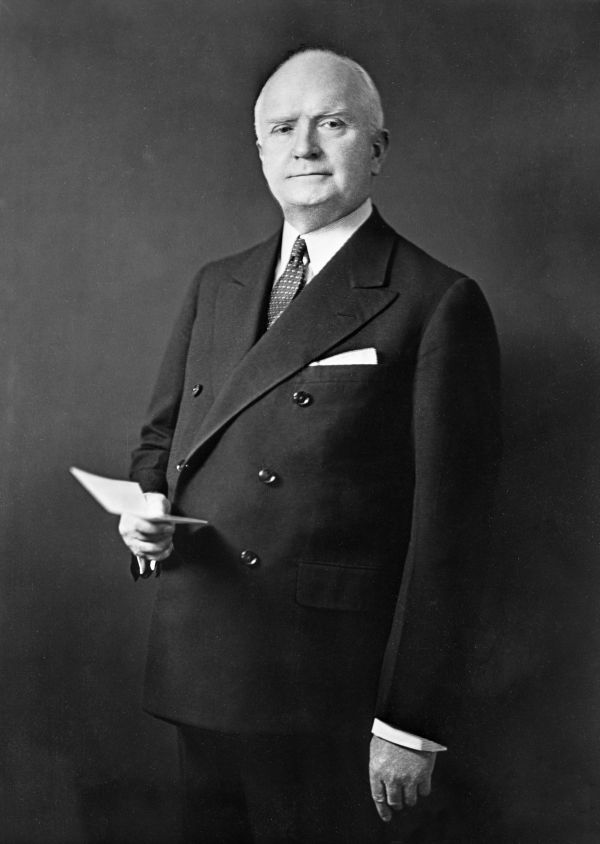

United States Ambassador to Portugal
- In office March 26, 1941 – July 21, 1943
- Preceded by: Herbert Claiborne Pell
- Succeeded by: Raymond Henry Norweb

United States Ambassador to Saudi Arabia
- In office February 4, 1940 – February 28, 1941
- Preceded by: Position established
- Succeeded by: Alexander Comstock Kirk

United States Ambassador to Egypt
- In office December 2, 1933 – February 28, 1941
- Preceded by: William M. Jardine
- Succeeded by: Alexander Comstock Kirk

Personal details
- Born: October 8, 1875 Bedford, Indiana, US
- Died: July 21, 1943 (aged 67) Lisbon, Portugal

Bert Fish (October 8, 1875 – July 21, 1943) was an American lawyer, judge, philanthropist, and ambassador.

== Early life ==
Fish originally hailed from Bedford, Indiana, but moved to Volusia County, Florida in 1881. He became the Superintendent of the Volusia County Schools district when he was 25, and went on to study at Stetson Law School and becoming a founding member of Stetson University's Sigma Nu chapter, graduating and being admitted to the Florida bar in 1902. Fish then joined a law partnership in DeLand, and from 1904 to 1910 served as a judge.

== Politics and diplomacy ==
Fish was the finance director of the Democratic National Committee and Franklin Roosevelt's Florida Campaign Manager during the 1932 presidential election and a reputed friend of Senator Claude Pepper.

=== Ambassador to Egypt ===
Upon Roosevelt's victory, Fish received the ambassadorship to Egypt, being appointed on September 6, 1933, and presenting his credentials December 2, 1933; because his appointment came while the Senate was in recess, he was subsequently confirmed on January 15, 1934, and recommissioned. As part of Fish's assignment in Egypt he would try to improve relations between Egypt, the United Kingdom and United States. During this time Egypt was a protectorate of the United Kingdom. At an April 12, 1937 international conference in Montreux, Switzerland Fish said Egypt had the right to govern and ability to do so which surprised foreign diplomats. This led to a new treaty being signed on May 8 which gave Egypt the ability to oversee its own laws and taxes without the British intervening. While serving in Egypt, Bert was seen positively because of his comment at the 1937 conference. Apart from his regular duties, he also enjoyed seeing the Egyptian pyramids and looking at "other antiquities" in his government issued Packard Super 8 car.

=== Ambassador to Saudi Arabia ===
Though still residing in Cairo, Fish was appointed the first U.S. ambassador to Saudi Arabia on August 7, 1939, presenting his credentials on February 4, 1940. Roosevelt's Administration wanted to have diplomatic relations begun with Saudi Arabia before the Japanese and/or German governments could do so because of their oil interests; with both the Japanese and Germans failing to do so. In the next few months he would still have his headquarters in Cairo but did frequently go to Jeddah. In mid-1940 he contacted Florida US Senator Claude Pepper who was on the US House Committee of Foreign Relations about being reassigned to Turkey.

He left both assignments on February 28, 1941. That February he took a steamer down the Red Sea to Jeddah, Saudi Arabia, where he gave a silver-framed photograph of Roosevelt to King Ibn Saud and was treated to a banquet by Prince Faisal.

=== Service in Portugal ===
Even before terminating these assignments, Fish was appointed as Envoy Extraordinary and Minister Plenipotentiary to Portugal on February 11, 1941, and presented credentials on March 26, 1941. At the time of his appointment Portugal was one of the only few countries in Europe that was neutral in World War II and in 1941 relations between the United States and Portugal were cooling down. When the United States entered the war, Secreatary of State Cordell Hull would push Fish to concentrate on getting higher imports of tungsten from Portugal, US landing rights in the Azores and returning Allied pilots and planes who were stuck in Portugal. Fish was not successful in getting more tungsten imports but was able to get some of the pilots who were interned out of Portugal. In June 1943 he asked Senator Pepper to give his posting the status of embassy and the position of ambassador but Roosevelt did not act on this due to Portugal's neutrality.

While at his new post he became ill, and later died of a heart attack on July 21, 1943 He received a Portuguese state funeral and was buried temporarily in Lisbon. His body was repatriated later that year to the United States buried at the Oakdale Cemetery in DeLand, Florida.

== Legacy ==
The American diplomat and historian George F. Kennan who served under Bert Fish in Lisbon, in his memoirs, describes Fish as a shrewd and amiable diplomat but placid and inactive, spending most of his days in an armchair in his room and seldom appearing at the legation chancery.

Bert Fish was recognized as a "Great Floridian" with a commemorative plaque for significant contributions to the history and culture of Florida. His Great Floridian plaque is located at the Fish Building, 100 North Woodland Boulevard, DeLand.

== Awards ==
In 1935 Stetson University bestowed an honorary LL.D. degree on Fish.
