= William J. Porter =

American diplomat (1914–1988)

William James Porter
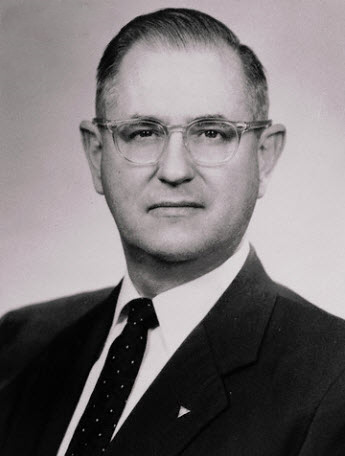

1st United States Ambassador to Algeria
- In office November 29, 1962 – July 29, 1965
- President: John F. Kennedy; Lyndon B. Johnson
- Preceded by: Diplomatic relations established
- Succeeded by: John D. Jernegan

8th United States Ambassador to South Korea
- In office August 23, 1967 – August 18, 1971
- President: Lyndon B. Johnson; Richard Nixon
- Preceded by: Winthrop G. Brown
- Succeeded by: Philip C. Habib

United States Ambassador to Canada
- In office March 13, 1974 – December 16, 1975
- President: Richard Nixon; Gerald Ford
- Preceded by: Adolph W. Schmidt
- Succeeded by: Thomas O. Enders

6th United States Ambassador to Saudi Arabia
- In office December 22, 1975 – May 27, 1977
- President: Gerald Ford; Jimmy Carter
- Preceded by: James E. Akins
- Succeeded by: John C. West

7th Under Secretary of State for Political Affairs
- In office February 2, 1973 – February 18, 1974
- President: Richard Nixon
- Preceded by: U. Alexis Johnson
- Succeeded by: Joseph J. Sisco

Personal details
- Born: September 1, 1914 Stalybridge, England
- Died: March 15, 1988 (aged 73) Fall River, Massachusetts, U.S.
- Citizenship: United Kingdom; United States (from 1936)
- Education: Boston College
- Profession: Diplomat, Career Ambassador
- Awards: President's Award for Distinguished Federal Civilian Service (1967)

William James Porter (September 1, 1914 – March 15, 1988) was a British-American diplomat who from 1971 to 1973 headed the U.S. delegation to the Paris Peace Talks to end the Vietnam War. Porter was the first-ever United States Ambassador to Algeria, and also served as Ambassador to South Korea, United States Ambassador to Canada, and Saudi Arabia.

== Biography ==
William J. Porter was born in Stalybridge, England on September 1, 1914, the son of a Royal Navy officer who died during World War I. After his father's death, his mother moved to Fall River, Massachusetts to join relatives. He graduated from Boston College in 1930, and took a secretarial course at the Thibodeau College of Business Administration in Fall River 1930–1932. Porter became a naturalized American citizen in 1936.

== Foreign service career ==
After a chance meeting with United States Minister to Hungary John Flournoy Montgomery, Montgomery invited Porter to come with him to Budapest as his private secretary in 1936. The next year, 1937, Porter joined the United States Foreign Service. As a Foreign Service Officer, Porter served in Baghdad 1937–1941; Beirut 1941–1943; and Damascus 1943–1946. While serving in Syria, he met and married Eleanore Henry, a United States Army nurse from Philadelphia, who was posted in Cairo. He spent 1946–1947 at the United States Department of State in Washington, D.C. as Palestine Desk Officer. He returned to the field in Nicosia 1947–1950. In 1951, he was special assistant to the Chief of Voice of America, and then spent 1951–1953 as Officer-in-Charge of Greek Affairs at the State Department.

Porter spent 1953 to 1957 at the American Embassy in Rabat; there, he was a first-hand witness to Moroccan independence in 1956. He was then the Director of the State Department's Office of North African Affairs from 1957 to 1961, and then Director of Voice of America 1961–1962.

In 1962, President of the United States John F. Kennedy appointed Porter as the first-ever United States Ambassador to Algeria in the wake of Algerian independence. He showed such skill in handling both French and Algerian officials that United States Ambassador to South Vietnam Henry Cabot Lodge Jr. asked that Porter be assigned to Saigon. He served as Deputy Ambassador to South Vietnam from 1965 to 1967. In 1967, President Lyndon Johnson appointed Porter United States Ambassador to South Korea and Porter held this post until 1971.

In 1971, President Richard Nixon selected Porter to replace David K. E. Bruce as head of the U.S. delegation at the Paris Peace Talks. Before those talks were ended, in 1973, Nixon named Porter Under Secretary of State for Political Affairs, with Porter holding this office from February 2, 1973, until February 18, 1974. Nixon then named Porter United States Ambassador to Canada, with Porter filling this post from March 13, 1974, until December 16, 1975.

President Gerald Ford then selected Porter as United States Ambassador to Saudi Arabia; Porter presented his credentials on February 21, 1976, and left this post on May 27, 1977.

== Retirement ==
Porter retired to Westport Point, Massachusetts in 1977. He died of cancer at the Rose Hawthorne Lathrop Home in Fall River, Massachusetts on March 15, 1988.

Diplomatic posts
Preceded by New Office	United States Ambassador to Algeria; 1962 – 1963	Succeeded by John D. Jernegan
Preceded by Winthrop G. Brown	United States Ambassador to South Korea; 1967 – 1971	Succeeded by Philip Habib
Preceded by Adolph W. Schmidt	United States Ambassador to Canada; March 13, 1974 – December 16, 1975	Succeeded by Thomas O. Enders
Preceded by James E. Akins	United States Ambassador to Saudi Arabia; February 21, 1976 – May 27, 1977	Succeeded by John C. West
Government offices
Preceded by U. Alexis Johnson	Under Secretary of State for Political Affairs; February 2, 1973 – February 18, 1974	Succeeded by Joseph J. Sisco
