= Walter L. Cutler =

American diplomat (1931–2026)

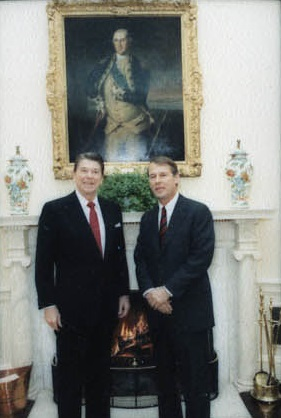
- Cutler in 1984 with President Ronald Reagan
- Born: November 25, 1931; Boston, Massachusetts, U.S.
- Died: July 2, 2026 (aged 94); Washington D.C., U.S.
- Education: Wesleyan University (B.A.); Fletcher School of Law and Diplomacy (M.A.)

Walter Leon Cutler (November 25, 1931 – July 2, 2026) was an American international consultant and advisor, with a focus on the Middle East, and a diplomat who served as a U.S. Ambassador.

Cutler was previously a career diplomat, serving twice as Ambassador to the Kingdom of Saudi Arabia (1984–87, 1988–89); Tunisia (1982–84); and Congo-Zaire (1975-79). He was Ambassador-Designate to the Pahlavi Kingdom of Iran before diplomatic relations were broken in 1980. Other foreign service included opening the first American post in Yaounde, Cameroon; political officer in Algiers just after Algeria's independence; consul in Tabriz, Iran; political-military officer in Seoul, Korea, at the time of North Korea's capture of the U.S intelligence ship Pueblo; and political officer in Saigon during the Vietnam war. At the Department of State he served as Executive Assistant to the Secretary of State; Special Assistant for Vietnam Negotiations; Director of Central African Affairs; and Senior Deputy Assistant Secretary of State for Congressional Relations. In 1987-88 he was a research professor of diplomacy at Georgetown University.

From 1989 to 2006, Cutler was President of Meridian International Center, a not-for-profit institution in Washington, D.C. dedicated to promoting global understanding through the exchange of people, ideas and the arts. He now serves as President Emeritus.

Later residing in Washington D.C. with his wife Isabel (Didi), Cutler was a member of The Council on Foreign Relations, The American Academy of Diplomacy, The Association for Diplomatic Studies and Training, The Foreign Service Association, The Middle East Institute, The National Council on U.S.-Arab Relations, Tunisian-American Young Professionals, and GlobalTies US. Born in Boston, Massachusetts, he was a graduate of Wesleyan University in Middletown, Connecticut, and the Fletcher School of International Law and Diplomacy in Medford, Massachusetts. He served two years in the U.S. Army.

Cutler died in Washington D.C. on July 2, 2026, at the age of 94.

Diplomatic posts
Preceded by Deane R. Hinton	United States Ambassador to the Democratic Republic of the Congo; 1975 – 1979	Succeeded by Robert B. Oakley
Preceded by Stephen Warren Bosworth	United States Ambassador to Tunisia; 1982 – 1984	Succeeded by Peter Sebastian
Preceded by Richard W. Murphy	United States Ambassador to Saudi Arabia; 1984 – 1987	Succeeded by Hume Alexander Horan
