= Adolph W. Schmidt =

American philanthropist

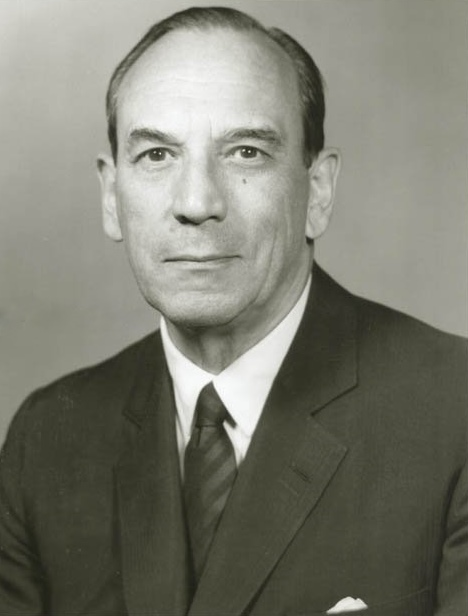

17th United States Ambassador to Canada
- In office September 11, 1969 – January 29, 1974
- President: Richard Nixon
- Preceded by: Harold F. Linder
- Succeeded by: William J. Porter

Personal details
- Born: September 13, 1904 McKeesport, Pennsylvania
- Died: December 17, 2000 (aged 96) Pittsburgh, Pennsylvania
- Spouse: Helen Mellon (m. 1936)
- Relations: Mellon family
- Children: Thomas Schmidt; Helen Schmidt
- Education: Princeton University; Harvard Business School
- Profession: Diplomat, Philanthropist
- Military career
- Allegiance: United States
- Branch: Office of Strategic Services
- Rank: Lieutenant colonel
- Conflicts: World War II

Adolph William Schmidt (September 13, 1904 – December 17, 2000) was a prominent Pittsburgh philanthropist who served as United States Ambassador to Canada from 1969 to 1974.

== Early life ==
Adolph W. Schmidt was born in 1904 and raised in McKeesport, Pennsylvania. He was educated at Princeton University and Harvard Business School. He met his future wife, Helen "Patsy" Mellon (great-granddaughter of Thomas Mellon, founder of the Mellon Bank), during a fox hunt at the Rolling Rock Club in the Ligonier Valley. The two married in 1936.

== Career ==
=== Military service ===
Schmidt joined the military following the outbreak of World War II. He served in the Office of Strategic Services (OSS) as an intelligence officer during the war, obtaining the rank of Lieutenant colonel. For a part of his service he served abroad in Africa, while his wife Helen was in Washington, D.C. working for the United States Navy.

=== Philanthropy and urban development ===
After the war, Schmidt became president of the A. W. Mellon Educational and Charitable Trust, serving in that role from 1946 to 1969. In this capacity, he played a major role in "Renaissance I", the urban renewal of Pittsburgh. He was also heavily involved in the creation of the University of Pittsburgh Graduate School of Public Health. Schmidt also served as president of the Presbyterian-University Hospital, was one of the co-founders of the Pittsburgh Playhouse, and was the first chairman of the Three Rivers Arts Festival.

=== Diplomatic service ===
Schmidt began his diplomatic career when he represented the United States at the 1957 Conference on North Atlantic Community and at the 1962 Atlantic Convention of NATO Nations. In 1969, President Richard Nixon named Schmidt United States Ambassador to Canada. Ambassador Schmidt presented his credentials on September 11, 1969, and served as the U.S. representative in Ottawa until January 29, 1974.

== Death and legacy ==
Schmidt died on December 17, 2000, at the age of 96. He was listed as one of the "Souls who enriched our lives, our region" by the Pittsburgh Tribune in 2002.

Diplomatic posts
Preceded by Harold F. Linder	United States Ambassador to Canada; September 11, 1969 – January 29, 1974	Succeeded by William J. Porter
