= James B. Smith =

US Air Force general & diplomat (born 1952)

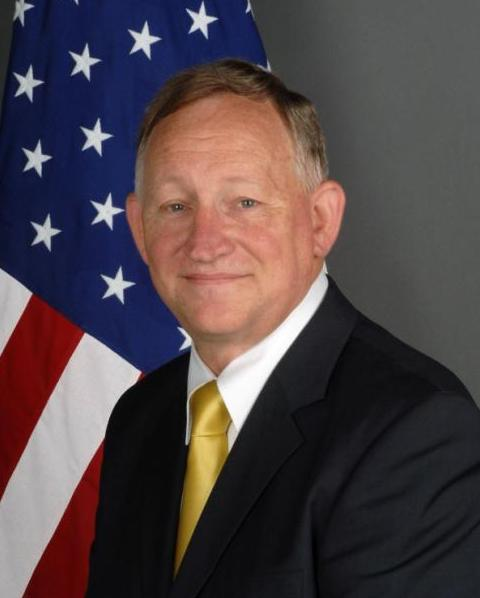

United States Ambassador to Saudi Arabia
- In office October 31, 2009 – September 27, 2013
- President: Barack Obama
- Preceded by: Ford M. Fraker
- Succeeded by: Joseph W. Westphal

Personal details
- Born: 1952 (age 73–74) Brooks, Georgia, U.S.
- Party: Democratic
- Spouse: Dr. Janet Breslin-Smith
- Education: U.S. Air Force Academy; Indiana University Bloomington

Military service
- Allegiance: United States
- Branch/service: United States Air Force
- Years of service: 1974–2002
- Rank: Brigadier general
- Battles/wars: Gulf War

James B. Smith (born 1952) is the former United States Ambassador to Saudi Arabia. Selected by President Barack Obama, he was sworn in on September 16, 2009. He left his post on September 27, 2013.

Prior to his appointment, Ambassador Smith had served in a variety of executive positions with Raytheon Company involving corporate strategic planning, aircraft manufacturing, and international business development.

== Early life and education ==
Smith was a distinguished graduate of the United States Air Force Academy’s Class of 1974 and received the Richard I. Bong award as the Outstanding Cadet in Military History. He received his master's degree in history from Indiana University Bloomington in 1975. He is a distinguished graduate from the Naval War College, the Air Command and Staff College and the National War College.

== Military career ==
Smith spent a 28-year career in the United States Air Force. Trained as a fighter pilot, he logged over 4,000 hours of flight time in F-15s and T-38s. He served around the world in a variety of operational assignments and flew combat missions from Dhahran AB during Operation Desert Storm. He commanded the 94th Fighter Squadron, the 325th Operations Group and the 18th Fighter Wing (Kadena Air Base, Okinawa). In addition, he served in a variety of staff assignments involving coalition partners, and served as Air Force Chair and Professor of Military Strategy at the National War College. During his final assignment at U.S. Joint Forces Command, he led Millennium Challenge, the largest transformation experiment in history. He was promoted to brigadier general in October, 1998, and retired from the Air Force on October 1, 2002.

== Civilian career ==
In April 2017, Smith was appointed to be the dean of the newly formed College of Engineering, Technology, and Aeronautics at Southern New Hampshire University (SNHU).

== Honors ==
Smith has received honorary degrees from SNHU and the University of Maryland University College.

Diplomatic posts
Preceded by Ford M. Fraker	United States Ambassador to Saudi Arabia; 2009–2013	Succeeded by Joseph W. Westphal
