= Ford M. Fraker =

American diplomat

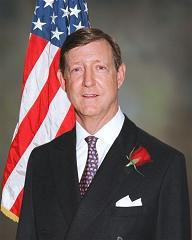
Ford M. Fraker. U.S. State Dep’t photo

Ford M. Fraker (1948 – September 4, 2017) was an American diplomat who served as U.S. Ambassador to Saudi Arabia. He was president of the Middle East Policy Council and chairman, Merrill Lynch Kingdom of Saudi Arabia.

== Career highlights ==
Prior to his nomination, Fraker was serving as chairman of the Trinity Group Limited, a private investment banking firm in the United Kingdom, and as a consultant for Intercontinental Real Estate Corporation in Boston.

Fraker graduated cum laude from Harvard University in 1971 with a Bachelor of Arts degree. He served as a banker in the Middle East for more than thirty years. He began his career with Chemical Bank, where he worked from 1972 to 1979. He worked in Lebanon, the UAE, and Bahrain, ending as a vice president and Regional Manager for the bank's Bahrain office. He joined the Saudi International Bank in 1979, and worked for SIB until 1991, holding positions of increasing management responsibility in the bank's General Banking, Credit and Client Development units. When he left SIB in 1991, Fraker was serving on the bank's Management Committee.

He founded Fraker & Co. in 1991, and in 1993, he joined MeesPierson Investment Finance (UK) Limited, where he was the managing director responsible for placing U.S. and European investment products with European and Middle Eastern institutional and private investors. In 1997, he co-founded Trinity Group Limited, and continued to serve as managing director and chairman until his nomination by President Bush. In 2009, he was named a senior advisor at private equity firm Kohlberg Kravis Roberts (KKR) and in 2013 he joined the Board of Directors of the Middle East Policy Council.

== Personal and family ==
As of 1990, Fraker has been married for 33 years and has three children. He was born in Princeton, New Jersey, and spoke French and Arabic.

Diplomatic posts
Preceded by James Oberwetter	United States Ambassador to Saudi Arabia; 2007–2009	Succeeded by James B. Smith
