= Hugh R. Wilson =

American diplomat (1885-1946)

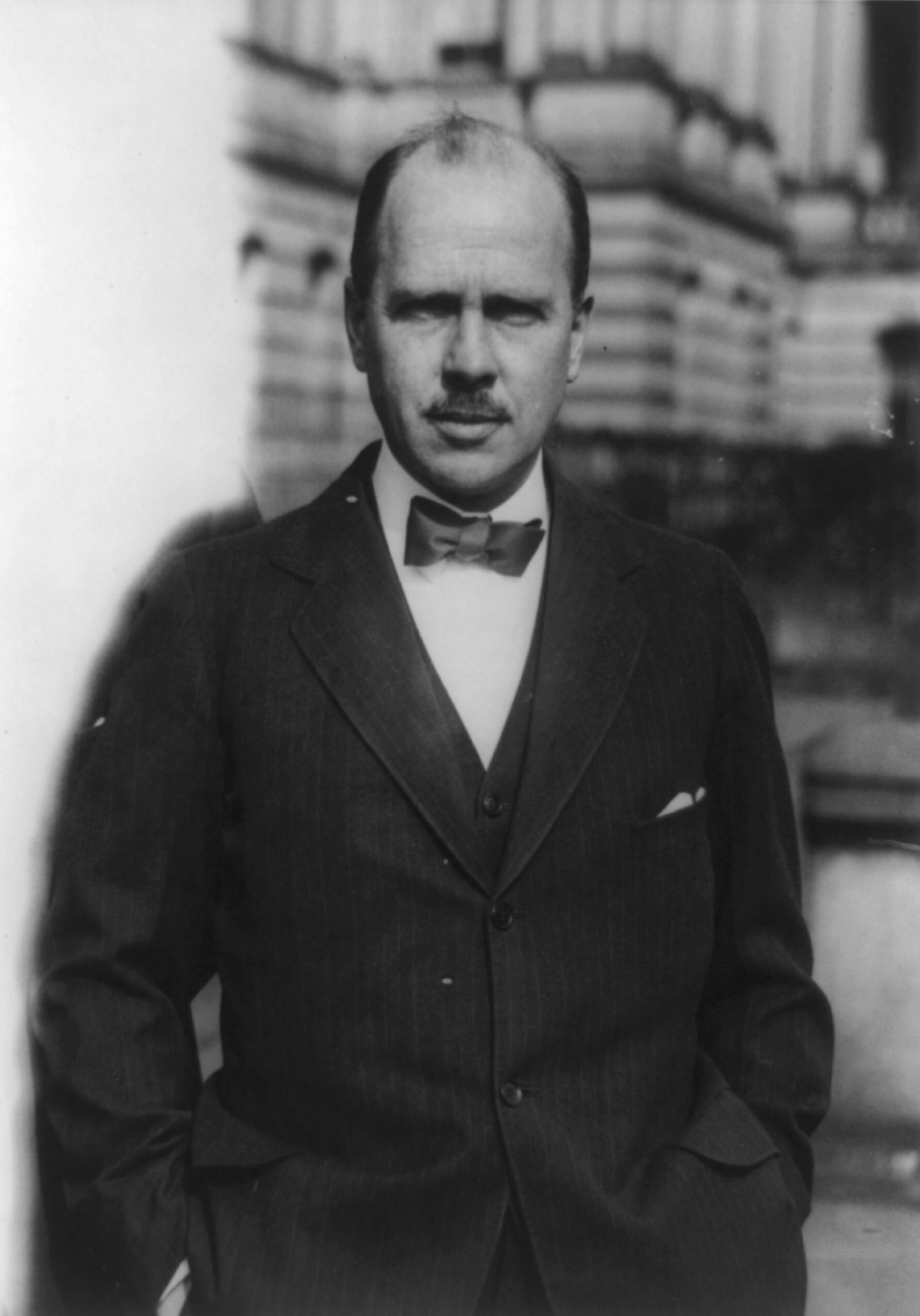
- Wilson in 1927

United States Ambassador to Germany
- In office March 3, 1938 – November 16, 1938
- President: Franklin D. Roosevelt
- Preceded by: William E. Dodd
- Succeeded by: Alexander Comstock Kirk (Acting)

United States Assistant Secretary of State
- In office August 23, 1937 – January 17, 1938
- President: Franklin D. Roosevelt
- Preceded by: George S. Messersmith
- Succeeded by: Adolf A. Berle

United States Minister to Switzerland
- In office June 11, 1927 – July 8, 1937
- President: Calvin Coolidge; Herbert Hoover; Franklin D. Roosevelt
- Preceded by: Hugh S. Gibson
- Succeeded by: Leland B. Harrison

Personal details
- Born: Hugh Robert Wilson; January 29, 1885 Evanston, Illinois, U.S.
- Died: December 29, 1946 (aged 61) Bennington, Vermont, U.S.
- Spouse: Katherine Boyle (m. 1914)
- Children: 1
- Education: Yale University; École Libre des Sciences Politiques

Hugh Robert Wilson (January 29, 1885 – December 29, 1946) was a member of the United States Foreign Service who headed the United States mission to Switzerland for ten years beginning in 1927. He became Assistant Secretary of State in 1937 and served for several months in 1938 as Ambassador to Germany.

== Biography ==
Wilson was born on January 29, 1885, in Evanston, Illinois, to Hugh Robert and Alice W. Wilson. He attended The Hill School for four years and graduated in 1902. He attended Yale University graduating in 1906. He worked in business for a few years and studied at the École Libre des Sciences Politiques, Paris in 1910. He served briefly in the delegation in Lisbon until, upon passing examinations for the Diplomatic Service, he was appointed secretary to the delegation in Guatemala. While in that post, Wilson married Katherine Boyle in London on April 25, 1914. He later served in Buenos Aires, Berlin, Vienna, Tokyo, and Berne. From 1924 to 1927 he worked in Washington as Chief of the Division of Current Information of the Department of State.

He held the position of Envoy Extraordinary and Minister Plenipotentiary to Switzerland from 1927 to 1937 and, during those years, represented the United States at many international conferences. On August 23, 1937, he became Assistant Secretary of State. He served as Ambassador to Germany from March 3 to November 16, 1938.

He attended the congress of the Nazi Party in Nuremberg in September 1938 and broke with the precedent established by his predecessor, William E. Dodd, who had refused to attend. In Dodd's absence, the embassy's chargé d'affaires had attended the previous year. President Franklin Roosevelt called Wilson home for urgent consultations in November 1938 after the anti-Jewish attacks on Kristallnacht, and Wilson never returned to Germany.

Wilson coined the phrase "pretty good club" while he described the foreign service. While he was the ambassador to Germany, he sought to emphasize the positive aspects of the country. He accused the American press of being "Jewish controlled" and of singing a "hymn of hate while efforts are made over here to build a better future." He praised Hitler as "the man who has pulled his people from moral and economic despair into the state of pride and evident prosperity they now enjoyed."

Yale awarded Wilson an honorary Doctor of Laws degree in 1939. Bryant College awarded him an honorary degree the same year.

Wilson held the title Advisor to Secretary of State until he retired from the Foreign Service on December 31, 1940. He returned to government service after the attack on Pearl Harbor and worked at the Office of Strategic Services from 1941 to 1945. He then accepted an appointment as chief of the foreign affairs section of the Republican National Committee.

With Pierre Cot, a French Cabinet Minister throughout the 1930s, and a known Soviet spy, Wilson taught a course at Yale in the spring of 1941.

Wilson died on December 29, 1946, in Bennington, Vermont, after a long illness.

Wilson's son Hugh R. Wilson, Jr., deposited his father's papers at the Herbert Hoover Presidential Library in 1968.

== Works ==
- The Education of a Diplomat (NY: Longmans, Green and Co., 1938)
- Diplomat between Wars (NY, Longmans, Green & Co., 1941)
- A Career Diplomat: The Third Chapter, The Third Reich (NY: Vantage Press, 1960)
- Disarmament and the Cold War in the Thirties (NY: Vantage Press 1963)
- Descent into Violence - Spain, January–July 1936 (Ilfracombe, Stockwell, 1969)

== Sources ==
Diplomatic posts
Preceded by William Dodd	United States Ambassador to Germany; March 3, 1938–November 16, 1938	Succeeded by Alexander C. Kirk
