= Peter J. Spiro =

American legal scholar

Peter John Spiro
- Born: 1961 (age 64–65)
- Known for: Expert on dual citizenship

Academic background
- Education: Harvard University

Academic work
- Discipline: Law

Peter John Spiro (born 1961) is an American legal scholar whose specialities include international law and U.S. constitutional law. He is a leading expert on dual citizenship. Formerly the Rusk Professor of International Law at the University of Georgia, since 2006 he has been the Charles R. Weiner Professor of Law at Temple University.

== Personal life and career ==
Spiro graduated from Harvard University in 1982, where he majored in history and wrote his senior honors thesis on France's relations with Germany in the immediate aftermath of World War II. He went on to the University of Virginia Law School, receiving his J.D. in 1987. For his first several years out of law school, Spiro circulated among various government and NGO positions in DC, spending two years in the State Department's Office of the Legal Adviser and two more as a law clerk for DC Circuit judge Stephen F. Williams and then Supreme Court Associate Justice David Souter. After spending 1992 and 1993 in private practice at Shea & Gardner, he joined the Carnegie Endowment for International Peace as a Council on Foreign Relations Fellow, and then the Clinton administration's National Security Council as Director for Democracy.

Spiro began teaching at the Hofstra University School of Law in 1994, where he remained until joining the faculty of the University of Georgia School of Law as the Dean and Virginia Rusk Professor of International Law in 2004. He was additionally appointed as UGA's associate dean for faculty development in 2005. The following year, he moved on to the Temple University Beasley School of Law as one of a number of hires that year aimed at expanding the university's highly ranked international law program.

== Works ==
=== Beyond Citizenship ===
Beyond Citizenship: American Identity After Globalization discusses the impact of dual citizenship, naturalization, and diaspora identity on citizenship in the United States. Spiro criticized traditional methods of ascribing nationality — jus soli and jus sanguinis — for their increasing disassociation with the reality of who participates in the American political and social community, and argued that the ultimate effect would be a decline in the importance of countries and citizenship laws. It was reviewed by political scientist Rogers Smith of the University of Pennsylvania in the Harvard Law Review.

=== At Home in Two Countries ===
At Home in Two Countries: The Past and Future of Dual Citizenship (New York University Press, 2016) describes the evolution of legal treatment and public attitudes towards multiple nationality in the United States, including milestones such as the Expatriation Act of 1868 and the Supreme Court case Afroyim v. Rusk, as well as Spiro's own experience of acquiring German citizenship.

=== Selected papers ===
- "Citizenship Overreach". Michigan Journal of International Law. 38: 167. 2017.
- Spiro, Peter J. (2011). "A New International Law of Citizenship". American Journal of International Law. 105 (4): 694. doi:10.5305/amerjintelaw.105.4.0694. S2CID 143124544.
- "The States and Immigration in an Era of Demi-Sovereignties". Virginia Journal of International Law. 35 (121). 1994.
- "The States and International Human Rights". Fordham Law Review. 66 (2). 1997.
- "Dual nationality and the Meaning of Citizenship". Emory Law Journal. 46 (4). 1997.

== See also ==
- List of law clerks for the third seat of the Supreme Court of the United States
